= Swimming at the 2012 Summer Paralympics – Men's 100 metre backstroke S9 =

Event at the 2012 Summer Paralympics

Men's 100m Backstroke S9 at the XIV Paralympic Games
- Venue: London Aquatics Centre
- Dates: 31 August 2012
- Competitors: 13 from 8 nations
- Winning time: 1:02.39

Medalists
1st place, gold medalist(s)		Matthew Cowdrey	Australia
2nd place, silver medalist(s)		James Crisp	Great Britain
3rd place, bronze medalist(s)		Liu Xiaobing	China

The men's 100m backstroke S9 event at the 2012 Summer Paralympics took place at the London Aquatics Centre on 31 August. There were two heats; the swimmers with the eight fastest times advanced to the final.

== Results ==
=== Heats ===
Competed from 10:30.

==== Heat 1 ====
Rank	Lane	Name	Nationality	Time	Notes
1	5	Michael Auprince	Australia	1:03.86	Q
2	4	James Crisp	Great Britain	1:04.01	Q
3	7	Brenden Hall	Australia	1:06.33	
4	3	Cody Bureau	United States	1:07.16	
5	6	Jesus Collado	Spain	1:07.58	
6	2	Andriy Kalyna	Ukraine	1:13.15	

==== Heat 2 ====
Rank	Lane	Name	Nationality	Time	Notes
1	5	Liu Xiaobing	China	1:04.91	Q
2	3	Morgyn Peters	Great Britain	1:05.12	Q
3	6	Tamás Sors	Hungary	1:05.20	Q
4	1	Laurence McGivern	Ireland	1:05.35	Q
5	4	Matthew Cowdrey	Australia	1:05.47	Q
6	7	Tamás Tóth	Hungary	1:06.13	Q
7	2	Michael Prout	United States	1:07.71	

=== Final ===
Competed at 18:32.

Rank	Lane	Name	Nationality	Time	Notes
1st place, gold medalist(s)	1	Matthew Cowdrey	Australia	1:02.39	PR
2nd place, silver medalist(s)	5	James Crisp	Great Britain	1:03.62	
3rd place, bronze medalist(s)	3	Liu Xiaobing	China	1:03.73	
4	4	Michael Auprince	Australia	1:03.98	
5	6	Morgyn Peters	Great Britain	1:04.79	
6	8	Tamás Tóth	Hungary	1:05.30	
7	2	Tamás Sors	Hungary	1:05.31	
8	7	Laurence McGivern	Ireland	1:06.11	

Q = qualified for final. PR = Paralympic Record.
