= Swimming at the 2004 Summer Paralympics – Men's 4 × 100 metre medley relay 34pts =

Men's 4x100m Medley 34 pts at the XII Paralympic Games
- Paralympic Swimming
- Venue: Olympic Aquatic Centre
- Dates: 27 September 2004
- Competitors: 13
- Winning time: 4:26.25

Medalists
1st place, gold medalist(s)		Rick Pendleton; Matthew Cowdrey; Alex Hadley; Sam Bramham	Australia
2nd place, silver medalist(s)		Wang Renjie; Li Keqiang; Wang Xiao Fu; Xiong Xiao Ming	China
3rd place, bronze medalist(s)		Piotr Pijanowski; Kamil Dragowski; Krzysztof Paterka; Mateusz Michalski	Poland

The Men's 4 x 100 metre medley relay 34pts swimming event at the 2004 Summer Paralympics was competed on 27 September. It was won by the team representing Australia.

== 1st round ==
Qualified for final round

Heat 1

27 Sept. 2004, morning session

Rank	Team	Time	Notes
1	China	4:35.89	
2	Australia	4:36.92	
3	Spain	4:40.68	
4	United States	4:44.49	
5	Canada	4:46.85	
	Brazil	DNS	

Heat 2

27 Sept. 2004, morning session

Rank	Team	Time	Notes
1	Poland	4:35.81	
2	Great Britain	4:36.26	
3	Ukraine	4:38.78	
4	Japan	4:54.41	
5	Denmark	4:57.55	
6	Germany	5:26.15	
	Netherlands	DSQ	

== Final round ==
27 Sept. 2004, evening session

Rank	Team	Time	Notes
1st place, gold medalist(s)	Australia	4:26.25	WR
2nd place, silver medalist(s)	China	4:30.19	
3rd place, bronze medalist(s)	Poland	4:30.80	
4	Great Britain	4:31.23	
5	Spain	4:33.90	
6	Ukraine	4:37.52	
7	United States	4:37.82	
8	Canada	4:41.98	

== Team Lists ==
China; Wang Renjie; Li Keqiang; Wang Xiao Fu; Xiong Xiao Ming	Australia; Rick Pendleton; Matthew Cowdrey; Alex Hadley; Sam Bramham	Spain; Daniel Vidal; David Levecq; Javier Crespo; Luis Alberto Nunez	United States; Michael Prout; Cody Bureau; Rudy Garcia; Mikhael Keyser
Canada; Andrew Haley; Brad Sales; Adam Purdy; Benoît Huot	Brazil; Marcelo Collet; Mauro Brasil; Fabiano Machado; Gledson Soares	Poland; Piotr Pijanowski; Kamil Dragowski; Krzysztof Paterka; Mateusz Michalski	Great Britain; James Crisp; Sascha Kindred; Giles Long; Robert Welbourn
Ukraine; Yuriy Andryushin; Andriy Sirovatchenko; Andriy Kalyna; Taras Yastremskyy	Japan; Takuro Yamada; Chikara Ara; Ryuji Sakimoto; Hiroshi Hosokawa	Denmark; Soren Moller; Claus Taudorf; Dennis Storgaard; Peter Lund Andersen	Germany; Christoph Burkard; Swen Michaelis; Thomas Grimm; Christopher Kueken
Netherlands; Joost de Hoogh; Kasper Engel; Mike van der Zanden; Gert-Jan Schep
