= Swimming at the 2004 Summer Paralympics – Men's 100 metre freestyle S9 =

Men's 100m Freestyle S9 at the XII Paralympic Games
- Paralympic Swimming
- Venue: Olympic Aquatic Centre
- Dates: 20 September 2004
- Competitors: 19 from 10 nations
- Winning time: 58.15

Medalists
1st place, gold medalist(s)		Matthew Cowdrey	Australia
2nd place, silver medalist(s)		Xiong Xiao Ming	China
3rd place, bronze medalist(s)		Michael Prout	United States

The Men's 100 metre freestyle S9 swimming event at the 2004 Summer Paralympics was competed on 20 September. It was won by Matthew Cowdrey, representing Australia.

== 1st round ==
Qualified for final round

Heat 1

20 Sept. 2004, morning session

Rank	Athlete	Time	Notes
1	Matthew Cowdrey (AUS)	58.77	
2	Wang Renjie (CHN)	1:00.12	
3	Jesus Collado (ESP)	1:00.25	
4	Jonas Martens (BEL)	1:02.16	
5	Mikhael Keyser (USA)	1:02.59	
6	Dale Grant (AUS)	1:02.90	

Heat 2

20 Sept. 2004, morning session

Rank	Athlete	Time	Notes
1	Michael Prout (USA)	59.63	
2	Luis Alberto Nunez (ESP)	1:01.10	
3	James Crisp (GBR)	1:01.49	
4	Wim de Paepe (BEL)	1:01.82	
5	Brad Sales (CAN)	1:02.27	
6	Andriy Sirovatchenko (UKR)	1:02.70	

Heat 3

20 Sept. 2004, morning session

Rank	Athlete	Time	Notes
1	Xiong Xiao Ming (CHN)	59.72	
2	Taras Yastremskyy (UKR)	59.76	
3	Andriy Kalyna (UKR)	1:00.37	
4	Mauro Brasil (BRA)	1:00.70	
5	Mark Barr (USA)	1:00.78	
6	Fabiano Machado (BRA)	1:01.59	
7	Pavel Machala (CZE)	1:02.29	

== Final round ==
20 Sept. 2004, evening session

Rank	Athlete	Time	Notes
1st place, gold medalist(s)	Matthew Cowdrey (AUS)	58.15	WR
2nd place, silver medalist(s)	Xiong Xiao Ming (CHN)	58.74	
3rd place, bronze medalist(s)	Michael Prout (USA)	59.21	
4	Andriy Kalyna (UKR)	59.46	
4	Jesus Collado (ESP)	59.46	
6	Wang Renjie (CHN)	59.58	
7	Mauro Brasil (BRA)	1:00.47	
8	Taras Yastremskyy (UKR)	1:00.54	
