= Swimming at the 2004 Summer Paralympics – Men's 100 metre butterfly S9 =

Men's 100m Butterfly S9 at the XII Paralympic Games
- Paralympic Swimming
- Venue: Olympic Aquatic Centre
- Dates: 19 September 2004
- Competitors: 14 from 9 nations
- Winning time: 1:02.66

Medalists
1st place, gold medalist(s)		Jesus Collado	Spain
2nd place, silver medalist(s)		Matthew Cowdrey	Australia
3rd place, bronze medalist(s)		Sam Bramham	Australia

The Men's 100 metre butterfly S9 swimming event at the 2004 Summer Paralympics was competed on 19 September. It was won by Jesus Collado, representing Spain.

== 1st round ==
Qualified for final round

Heat 1

19 Sept. 2004, morning session

Rank	Athlete	Time	Notes
1	Michael Prout (USA)	1:05.99	
2	James Crisp (GBR)	1:06.06	
3	Alex Racoveanu (SWE)	1:06.53	
4	Cody Bureau (USA)	1:07.27	
5	Mauro Brasil (BRA)	1:08.29	
6	Fabiano Machado (BRA)	1:14.99	
	Xiong Xiao Ming (CHN)	DSQ	

Heat 2

19 Sept. 2004, morning session

Rank	Athlete	Time	Notes
1	Sam Bramham (AUS)	1:04.24	WR
2	Jesus Collado (ESP)	1:05.13	
3	Matthew Cowdrey (AUS)	1:05.34	
4	Andrew Haley (CAN)	1:05.35	
5	Mark Barr (USA)	1:05.98	
6	Dennis Storgaard (DEN)	1:07.97	
7	Pablo Galindo (ESP)	1:08.18	

== Final round ==
19 Sept. 2004, evening session

Rank	Athlete	Time	Notes
1st place, gold medalist(s)	Jesus Collado (ESP)	1:02.66	WR
2nd place, silver medalist(s)	Matthew Cowdrey (AUS)	1:04.24	
3rd place, bronze medalist(s)	Sam Bramham (AUS)	1:04.25	
4	Mark Barr (USA)	1:04.93	
5	Alex Racoveanu (SWE)	1:05.77	
6	Michael Prout (USA)	1:05.98	
7	Andrew Haley (CAN)	1:06.41	
8	James Crisp (GBR)	1:06.87	
