= Swimming at the 2004 Summer Paralympics – Men's 50 metre freestyle S9 =

Men's 50m Freestyle S9 at the XII Paralympic Games
- Paralympic Swimming
- Venue: Olympic Aquatic Centre
- Dates: 26 September 2004
- Competitors: 21 from 13 nations
- Winning time: 26.37

Medalists
1st place, gold medalist(s)		Xiong Xiao Ming	China
2nd place, silver medalist(s)		Wang Renjie	China
3rd place, bronze medalist(s)		Matthew Cowdrey	Australia

The Men's 50 metre freestyle S9 swimming event at the 2004 Summer Paralympics was competed on 26 September. It was won by Xiong Xiao Ming, representing China.

== 1st round ==
Qualified for final round

Heat 1

26 Sept. 2004, morning session

Rank	Athlete	Time	Notes
1	Andriy Kalyna (UKR)	27.65	
2	Jonas Martens (BEL)	27.97	
3	Takuro Yamada (JPN)	28.03	
4	Taras Yastremskyy (UKR)	28.08	
5	Mikhael Keyser (USA)	28.31	
6	Aidan McGlynn (IRL)	29.15	
7	Manasa Marisiale (FIJ)	30.65	

Heat 2

26 Sept. 2004, morning session

Rank	Athlete	Time	Notes
1	Mauro Brasil (BRA)	27.22	
2	Luis Alberto Nunez (ESP)	27.40	
3	Andriy Sirovatchenko (UKR)	27.86	
4	Michael Prout (USA)	28.02	
5	Jesus Collado (ESP)	28.25	
6	Pavel Machala (CZE)	28.47	
7	Fabiano Machado (BRA)	28.57	

Heat 3

26 Sept. 2004, morning session

Rank	Athlete	Time	Notes
1	Xiong Xiao Ming (CHN)	26.86	
2	Wang Renjie (CHN)	27.13	
3	Matthew Cowdrey (AUS)	27.29	
4	Mark Barr (USA)	28.09	
5	Dale Grant (AUS)	28.30	
6	Hanoch Budin (ISR)	28.99	
7	James Crisp (GBR)	29.45	

== Final round ==
26 Sept. 2004, evening session

Rank	Athlete	Time	Notes
1st place, gold medalist(s)	Xiong Xiao Ming (CHN)	26.37	
2nd place, silver medalist(s)	Wang Renjie (CHN)	26.82	
3rd place, bronze medalist(s)	Matthew Cowdrey (AUS)	26.88	
4	Andriy Kalyna (UKR)	27.44	
5	Mauro Brasil (BRA)	27.51	
6	Luis Alberto Nunez (ESP)	27.61	
7	Jonas Martens (BEL)	27.84	
8	Andriy Sirovatchenko (UKR)	27.93	
