= Swimming at the 2004 Summer Paralympics – Men's 4 × 100 metre freestyle relay 34pts =

Men's 4x100m Freestyle 34 pts at the XII Paralympic Games
- Paralympic Swimming
- Venue: Olympic Aquatic Centre
- Dates: 22 September 2004
- Competitors: 12
- Winning time: 3:59.62

Medalists
1st place, gold medalist(s)		Robert Welbourn; David Roberts; Marc Woods; Matthew Walker	Great Britain
2nd place, silver medalist(s)		Sam Bramham; Alex Hadley; Ricardo Moffatti; Daniel Bell	Australia
3rd place, bronze medalist(s)		Xiong Xiao Ming; Yin Jianhua; Yu Qi Min; Wang Renjie	China

The Men's 4 x 100 metre freestyle relay 34pts swimming event at the 2004 Summer Paralympics was competed on 22 September. It was won by the team representing Great Britain.

== 1st round ==
Qualified for final round

Heat 1

22 Sept. 2004, morning session

Rank	Team	Time	Notes
1	Brazil	4:11.74	
2	China	4:12.15	
3	Spain	4:13.24	
4	Canada	4:21.64	
5	Japan	4:33.01	
6	Germany	4:39.96	

Heat 2

22 Sept. 2004, morning session

Rank	Team	Time	Notes
1	Great Britain	4:05.14	PR
2	Australia	4:07.80	
3	United States	4:09.07	
4	Czech Republic	4:21.77	
5	Ukraine	4:22.35	
6	Argentina	6:24.41	

== Final round ==
22 Sept. 2004, evening session

Rank	Team	Time	Notes
1st place, gold medalist(s)	Great Britain	3:59.62	WR
2nd place, silver medalist(s)	Australia	4:02.04	
3rd place, bronze medalist(s)	China	4:06.01	
4	Spain	4:06.29	
5	United States	4:08.74	
6	Brazil	4:11.96	
7	Canada	4:16.86	
8	Czech Republic	4:22.35	

== Team Lists ==
Brazil; Adriano Lima; Fabiano Machado; Mauro Brasil; Marcelo Collet	China; Xiong Xiao Ming; Yin Jianhua; Yu Qi Min; Wang Renjie	Spain; Daniel Vidal Fuster; David Julián Levecq Vives; Jesús Collado Alarcón; Luis Alberto Nunez	Canada; Benoît Huot; Adam Purdy; Brad Sales; Andrew Haley
Japan; Jumpei Kimura; Ryuji Sakimoto; Chikara Ara; Takuro Yamada	Germany; Christoph Burkard; Swen Michaelis; Sebastian Iwanow; Christopher Kueken	Great Britain; Robert Welbourn; David Roberts; Marc Woods; Matthew Walker	Australia; Sam Bramham; Alex Hadley; Ricardo Moffatti; Daniel Bell
United States; Michael Prout; Lantz Lamback; Mark Barr; Mikhael Keyser	Czech Republic; Filip Coufal; Tomas Scharf; Dalibor Mach; Lukas Urbanek	Ukraine; Yuriy Andryushin; Andriy Sirovatchenko; Andriy Kalyna; Taras Yastremskyy	Argentina; Marcelo Ariel Quassi; Diego Pastore; Sebastian Facundo Ramirez; Fernando Carlomagno
