= Swimming at the 2008 Summer Paralympics – Men's 50 metre freestyle S9 =

Men's 50m Freestyle S9 at the XIII Paralympic Games
- Venue: Beijing National Aquatics Center
- Dates: 14 September
- Competitors: 23 from 16 nations
- Winning time: 25.34

Medalists
1st place, gold medalist(s)		Matthew Cowdrey	Australia
2nd place, silver medalist(s)		Guo Zhi	China
3rd place, bronze medalist(s)		Xiong Xiaoming	China

The men's 50m freestyle S9 event at the 2008 Summer Paralympics took place at the Beijing National Aquatics Center on 14 September. There were three heats; the swimmers with the eight fastest times advanced to the final.

== Results ==
=== Heats ===
Competed from 10:38.

==== Heat 1 ====
Rank	Name	Nationality	Time	Notes
1	Xiong Xiaoming	China	25.77	Q
2	Wang Renjie	China	26.04	Q
3	Cody Bureau	United States	27.11	
4	Mauro Brasil	Brazil	27.18	
5	Andriy Sirovatchenko	Ukraine	27.27	
6	Dmitry Polin	Russia	29.46	
7	Pascal Laperotine	Mauritius	36.39	

==== Heat 2 ====
Rank	Name	Nationality	Time	Notes
1	Guo Zhi	China	25.69	Q
2	Andriy Kalyna	Ukraine	26.30	Q
3	Sami El Gueddari	France	26.70	Q
4	Simon Miller	Great Britain	27.41	
5	Christian Thomsen	Denmark	27.50	
6	Mark Barr	United States	27.89	
7	Michael Prout	United States	28.12	
8	Josefa Harijaona Randrianony	Madagascar	38.06	

==== Heat 3 ====
Rank	Name	Nationality	Time	Notes
1	Matthew Cowdrey	Australia	26.09	Q
2	Jose Antonio Mari	Spain	26.73	Q
3	Tamás Sors	Hungary	26.73	Q
4	David Grachat	Portugal	26.77	
5	Takuro Yamada	Japan	27.04	
6	Stephen Osborne	Australia	27.20	
7	Taras Yastremskyy	Ukraine	27.83	
8	David Taylor	Barbados	47.73	

=== Final ===
Source: Competed at 19:59.

Rank	Name	Nationality	Time	Notes
1st place, gold medalist(s)	Matthew Cowdrey	Australia	25.34	WR
2nd place, silver medalist(s)	Guo Zhi	China	25.51	
3rd place, bronze medalist(s)	Xiong Xiaoming	China	25.60	
4	Wang Renjie	China	26.03	
5	Tamás Sors	Hungary	26.21	
6	Andriy Kalyna	Ukraine	26.46	
7	Sami El Gueddari	France	26.65	
8	Jose Antonio Mari	Spain	26.89	
