= Swimming at the 2012 Summer Paralympics – Men's 100 metre butterfly S9 =

Event at the 2012 Summer Paralympics

Men's 100 metre butterfly S9 at the XIV Paralympic Games
- Venue: London Aquatics Centre
- Dates: 30 August 2012
- Competitors: 16 from 9 nations

Medalists
1st place, gold medalist(s)		Tamás Sors	Hungary
2nd place, silver medalist(s)		Matthew Cowdrey	Australia
3rd place, bronze medalist(s)		Federico Morlacchi	Italy

The men's 100 metre butterfly S9 event at the 2012 Paralympic Games took place on 30 August, at the London Aquatics Centre.

Two heats were held with eight swimmers in each. The swimmers with the eight fastest times advanced to the final.

== Heats ==
=== Heat 1 ===
Rank	Lane	Name	Nationality	Time	Notes
1	4	Federico Morlacchi	Italy	01:01.68	Q
2	2	Tamás Tóth	Hungary	01:02.44	Q
3	3	Andriy Sirovatchenko	Ukraine	01:02.60	Q
4	5	Kristijan Vincetic	Croatia	01:03.25	
5	6	Csaba Meilinger	Hungary	01:03.65	
6	1	Michael Auprince	Australia	01:05.33	
7	8	Martin Schulz	Germany	01:06.54	
8	7	Iurii Martynov	Ukraine	01:08.81	

=== Heat 2 ===
Rank	Lane	Name	Nationality	Time	Notes
1	4	Tamás Sors	Hungary	00:59.94	Q
2	3	Jose Antonio Mari Alcaraz	Spain	01:01.65	Q
3	6	Brendan Hall	Australia	01:01.82	Q
4	5	Matthew Cowdrey	Australia	01:02.31	Q
5	2	Jesus Collado	Spain	01:02.57	Q
6	1	Eduard Samarin	Russia	01:03.17	
7	7	Cory Bureau	United States	01:03.66	
8	8	Michael Prout	United States	01:05.22	

== Final ==
Rank	Lane	Name	Nationality	Time	Notes
1st place, gold medalist(s)	4	Tamás Sors	Hungary	00:59.54	
2nd place, silver medalist(s)	2	Matthew Cowdrey	Australia	00:59.91	
3rd place, bronze medalist(s)	3	Federico Morlacchi	Italy	01:00.77	
4	5	Jose Antonio Mari Alcaraz	Spain	01:00.98	
5	1	Jesus Collado	Spain	01:01.28	
6	6	Brendan Hall	Australia	01:01.31	
7	7	Tamás Tóth	Hungary	01:01.37	
8	8	Andriy Sirovatchenko	Ukraine	01:03.63	
