= Swimming at the 2008 Summer Paralympics – Men's 100 metre freestyle S9 =

2008 summer olympics event

Men's 100m Freestyle S9 at the XIII Paralympic Games
- Venue: Beijing National Aquatics Center
- Dates: 8 September
- Competitors: 20 from 11 nations
- Winning time: 55.30

Medalists
1st place, gold medalist(s)		Matthew Cowdrey	Australia
2nd place, silver medalist(s)		Guo Zhi	China
3rd place, bronze medalist(s)		Tamás Sors	Hungary

The men's 100m freestyle S9 event at the 2008 Summer Paralympics took place at the Beijing National Aquatics Center on 8 September. There were three heats; the swimmers with the eight fastest times advanced to the final.

== Results ==
=== Heats ===
Competed from 10:58.

==== Heat 1 ====
Rank	Name	Nationality	Time	Notes
1	Tamás Sors	Hungary	57.59	Q, PR
2	Xiong Xiaoming	China	58.94	
3	Jose Antonio Mari	Spain	59.07	
4	Simon Miller	Great Britain	59.08	
5	Michael Prout	United States	59.18	
6	Taras Yastremskyy	Ukraine	59.37	

==== Heat 2 ====
Rank	Name	Nationality	Time	Notes
1	Guo Zhi	China	56.24	Q, PR
2	Takuro Yamada	Japan	57.82	Q
3	Sami El Gueddari	France	58.72	Q
4	Jesus Collado	Spain	58.82	
5	Sam Bramham	Australia	58.97	
6	Wang Renjie	China	59.00	
7	Andriy Sirovatchenko	Ukraine	1:00.18	

==== Heat 3 ====
Rank	Name	Nationality	Time	Notes
1	Matthew Cowdrey	Australia	56.53	Q
2	Andriy Kalyna	Ukraine	57.35	Q
3	David Grachat	Portugal	57.93	Q
4	Cody Bureau	United States	58.29	Q
5	Mark Barr	United States	59.56	
6	Stephen Osborne	Australia	59.70	
7	Christian Thomsen	Denmark	59.99	

=== Final ===
Competed at 20:22.

Rank	Name	Nationality	Time	Notes
1st place, gold medalist(s)	Matthew Cowdrey	Australia	55.30	WR
2nd place, silver medalist(s)	Guo Zhi	China	56.13	
3rd place, bronze medalist(s)	Tamás Sors	Hungary	56.80	
4	Andriy Kalyna	Ukraine	57.12	
5	Takuro Yamada	Japan	57.29	
6	David Grachat	Portugal	57.55	
7	Cody Bureau	United States	58.14	
8	Sami El Gueddari	France	58.68	

Q = qualified for final. WR = World Record. PR = Paralympic Record.
