= Swimming at the 2008 Summer Paralympics – Men's 4 × 100 metre freestyle relay – 34 points =

Beijing Paralympics

Men's 4x100m Medley Relay 34 points at the XIII Paralympic Games
- Venue: Beijing National Aquatics Center
- Dates: 10 September
- Competitors: 8
- Winning time: 3:51.43

Medalists
1st place, gold medalist(s)		Great Britain (GBR); Matt Walker, Graham Edmunds, David Roberts, Robert Welbourn
2nd place, silver medalist(s)		Australia (AUS); Ben Austin, Peter Leek, Sam Bramham, Matthew Cowdrey
3rd place, bronze medalist(s)		China (CHN); Xiong Xiaoming, Wei Yanpeng, Wang Xiaofu, Guo Zhi

The men's 4x100m medley relay 34 points event at the 2008 Summer Paralympics took place at the Beijing National Aquatics Center on 10 September. There were no heats in this event.

== Results ==
=== Final ===
Competed at 19:07.

Rank	Lane	Nation	Swimmers	Time	Notes
1st place, gold medalist(s)	4	Great Britain	Matt Walker; Graham Edmunds; David Roberts; Robert Welbourn	3:51.43	WR
2nd place, silver medalist(s)	5	Australia	Ben Austin; Peter Leek; Sam Bramham; Matthew Cowdrey	3:53.59	
3rd place, bronze medalist(s)	8	China	Xiong Xiaoming; Wei Yanpeng; Wang Xiaofu; Guo Zhi	3:53.92	
4	3	Brazil	Mauro Brasil; Daniel Dias; Phelipe Rodrigues; André Brasil	3:55.78	
5	2	Spain	David Julián Levecq Vives; Daniel Vidal Fuster; Jesús Collado Alarcón; José Antonio Mari-Alcaraz	3:59.45	
6	6	United States	Michael Prout; Mark Barr; Lantz Lamback; Cody Bureau	3:59.97	
7	1	Germany	Swen Michaelis; Nikolai Willig; Roy Tobis; Lucas Ludwig	4:04.45	
8	7	Russia	Konstantin Lisenkov; Mikhail Sidnin; Eduard Samarin; Mikhail Boyarin	4:10.52	

WR = World Record.
