= Swimming at the 2012 Summer Paralympics – Men's 100 metre freestyle S9 =

Event at the 2012 Summer Paralympics

Men's 100m Freestyle S9 at the XIV Paralympic Games
- Venue: London Aquatics Centre
- Dates: 7 September 2012
- Competitors: 16 from 12 nations
- Winning time: 55.84

Medalists
| 1st place, gold medalist(s) | | Matthew Cowdrey | Australia |
| 2nd place, silver medalist(s) | | Tamás Tóth | Hungary |
| 3rd place, bronze medalist(s) | | Tamás Sors | Hungary |

The men's 100m freestyle S9 event at the 2012 Summer Paralympics took place at the London Aquatics Centre on 7 September. There were three heats; the swimmers with the eight fastest times advanced to the final.

== Results ==
=== Heats ===
==== Heat 1 ====
| Rank | Lane | Name | Nationality | Time | Notes |
|---|---|---|---|---|---|
| 1 | 4 | Tamás Tóth | Hungary | 57.48 | Q |
| 2 | 5 | Andriy Kalyna | Ukraine | 58.26 | Q |
| 3 | 3 | David Grachat | Portugal | 58.80 | |
| 4 | 6 | Andriy Sirovatchenko | Ukraine | 59.76 | |
| 5 | 7 | Michael Prout | United States | 59.88 | |
| 6 | 2 | Kristijan Vincetic | Croatia | 1:00.86 | |

==== Heat 2 ====
| Rank | Lane | Name | Nationality | Time | Notes |
|---|---|---|---|---|---|
| 1 | 4 | Jose Antonio Mari Alcaraz | Spain | 57.23 | Q |
| 2 | 5 | Brenden Hall | Australia | 57.45 | Q |
| 3 | 3 | Federico Morlacchi | Italy | 58.57 | Q |
| 4 | 6 | Csaba Meilinger | Hungary | 59.17 | |
| 5 | 7 | Cody Bureau | United States | 59.71 | |
| 6 | 2 | Iurii Martynov | Ukraine | 1:02.40 | |

==== Heat 3 ====
| Rank | Lane | Name | Nationality | Time | Notes |
|---|---|---|---|---|---|
| 1 | 4 | Matthew Cowdrey | Australia | 56.58 | Q |
| 2 | 3 | Takuro Yamada | Japan | 57.98 | Q |
| 3 | 5 | Tamás Sors | Hungary | 58.47 | Q |
| 4 | 6 | Michael Auprince | Australia | 58.94 | |
| 5 | 7 | El Sami Gueddari | France | 59.17 | |
| 6 | 2 | Eduard Samarin | Russia | 1:00.73 | |
| 7 | 1 | James Crisp | Great Britain | 1:00.76 | |

=== Final ===
Competed at 17:30.

| Rank | Lane | Name | Nationality | Time | Notes |
|---|---|---|---|---|---|
| 1st place, gold medalist(s) | 4 | Matthew Cowdrey | Australia | 55.84 | |
| 2nd place, silver medalist(s) | 6 | Tamás Tóth | Hungary | 56.46 | |
| 3rd place, bronze medalist(s) | 1 | Tamás Sors | Hungary | 56.69 | |
| 4 | 5 | Jose Antonio Mari Alcaraz | Spain | 56.75 | |
| 5 | 3 | Brenden Hall | Australia | 57.29 | |
| 6 | 2 | Takuro Yamada | Japan | 57.55 | |
| 7 | 7 | Andriy Kalyna | Ukraine | 57.59 | |
| 8 | 8 | Federico Morlacchi | Italy | 58.24 | |

Q = qualified for final.
