= Swimming at the 2008 Summer Paralympics – Men's 100 metre butterfly S9 =

Men's 100 metre butterfly S9 at the XIII Paralympic Games
- Venue: Beijing National Aquatics Center
- Dates: September 7
- Competitors: 13 from 7 nations

Medalists
1st place, gold medalist(s)		Tamás Sors	Hungary
2nd place, silver medalist(s)		Matthew Cowdrey	Australia
3rd place, bronze medalist(s)		Zhi Guo	China

The men's 100 metre butterfly S9 event at the 2008 Paralympic Games took place on September 7, at the Beijing National Aquatics Center.

Two heats were held, with six swimmers in the first heat and seven swimmers in the second heat. The swimmers with the eight fastest times advanced to the final; there, they all competed in a single final heat to earn final placements.

== Heats ==
=== Heat 1 ===
Rank	Lane	Name	Nationality	Time	Notes
1	4	Tamás Sors	Hungary	59.38	Q
2	5	Zhi Guo	China	1:00.38	Q
3	3	Jesus Collado	Spain	1:02.55	Q
4	6	Andriy Sirovatchenko	Ukraine	1:04.00	
5	7	Kristijan Vicentic	Croatia	1:04.51	
6	2	Stephen Osborne	Australia	1:06.33	

=== Heat 2 ===
Rank	Lane	Name	Nationality	Time	Notes
1	4	Matthew Cowdrey	Australia	1:01.05	Q
2	5	Sam Bramham	Australia	1:02.33	Q
3	6	Cody Bureau	United States	1:02.42	Q
4	2	Andriy Kalyna	Ukraine	1:03.09	Q
5	3	Mark Barr	United States	1:03.94	Q
6	7	Jose Antonio Mari	Spain	1:05.26	
7	1	Michael Prout Jr.	United States	1:05.81	

== Final ==
Rank	Lane	Name	Nationality	Time	Notes
1	4	Tamás Sors	Hungary	59.34	
2	3	Matthew Cowdrey	Australia	59.46	
3	5	Zhi Guo	China	1:00.11	
4	7	Jesus Collado	Spain	1:01.28	
5	1	Andriy Kalyna	Ukraine	1:02.00	
6	2	Cody Bureau	United States	1:02.21	
7	6	Sam Bramham	Australia	1:02.58	
8	8	Mark Barr	United States	1:03.91	
