= Swimming at the 2012 Summer Paralympics – Men's 200 metre individual medley SM9 =

Event at the 2012 Summer Paralympics

Men's 200m Ind. Medley SM9 at the XIV Paralympic Games
- Venue: London Aquatics Centre
- Dates: 6 September 2012
- Competitors: 14 from 9 nations
- Winning time: 2:15.95

Medalists
1st place, gold medalist(s)		Matthew Cowdrey	Australia
2nd place, silver medalist(s)		Andriy Kalyna	Ukraine
3rd place, bronze medalist(s)		Federico Morlacchi	Italy

The men's 200m ind. medley SM9 event at the 2012 Summer Paralympics took place at the London Aquatics Centre on 6 September. There were two heats; the swimmers with the eight fastest times advanced to the final.

== Results ==
=== Heats ===
Competed from 09:30.

==== Heat 1 ====
Rank	Lane	Name	Nationality	Time	Notes
1	4	Andriy Kalyna	Ukraine	2:20.38	Q
2	3	Federico Morlacchi	Italy	2:23.32	Q
3	6	Brenden Hall	Australia	2:23.42	Q
4	2	Csaba Meilinger	Hungary	2:25.92	
5	1	Michael Auprince	Australia	2:26.36	
6	7	Michael Prout	United States	2:26.48	

==== Heat 2 ====
Rank	Lane	Name	Nationality	Time	Notes
1	4	Matthew Cowdrey	Australia	2:19.79	Q
2	5	James Crisp	Great Britain	2:22.09	Q
3	6	Cody Bureau	United States	2:23.09	Q
4	3	Tamas Toth	Hungary	2:23.83	Q
5	2	Iurii Martynov	Ukraine	2:25.68	Q
6	7	David Grachat	Portugal	2:27.01	
7	1	Martin Schulz	Germany	2:27.18	
8	8	Eduard Samarin	Russia	2:29.14	

=== Final ===
Competed at 17:30.

Rank	Lane	Name	Nationality	Time	Notes
1st place, gold medalist(s)	4	Matthew Cowdrey	Australia	2:15.95	
2nd place, silver medalist(s)	5	Andriy Kalyna	Ukraine	2:16.38	EU
3rd place, bronze medalist(s)	2	Federico Morlacchi	Italy	2:20.28	
4	1	Tamas Toth	Hungary	2:21.04	
5	3	James Crisp	Great Britain	2:21.10	
6	7	Brenden Hall	Australia	2:21.48	
7	6	Cody Bureau	United States	2:22.24	
8	8	Iurii Martynov	Ukraine	2:26.65	

Q = qualified for final. EU = European Record.
