= Swimming at the 2012 Summer Paralympics – Men's 50 metre freestyle S9 =

Event at the 2012 Summer Paralympics

Men's 50m Freestyle S9 at the XIV Paralympic Games
- Venue: London Aquatics Centre
- Dates: 5 September 2012
- Competitors: 17 from 11 nations
- Winning time: 25.13

Medalists
1st place, gold medalist(s)		Matthew Cowdrey	Australia
2nd place, silver medalist(s)		Tamás Tóth	Hungary
3rd place, bronze medalist(s)		Jose Antonio Mari Alcaraz	Spain

The men's 50m freestyle S9 event at the 2012 Summer Paralympics took place at the London Aquatics Centre on 5 September. There were three heats; the swimmers with the eight fastest times advanced to the final.

== Results ==
=== Heats ===
Competed from 11:31.

==== Heat 1 ====
Rank	Lane	Name	Nationality	Time	Notes
1	4	Jose Antonio Mari Alcaraz	Spain	26.18	Q
2	5	Andriy Kalyna	Ukraine	26.61	Q
3	6	Csaba Meilinger	Hungary	26.71	Q
4	3	David Grachat	Portugal	27.18	
5	2	Scody Victor	Mauritius	34.26	

==== Heat 2 ====
Rank	Lane	Name	Nationality	Time	Notes
1	4	Tamás Tóth	Hungary	25.67	Q
2	5	Takuro Yamada	Japan	26.33	Q
3	3	Sami El Gueddari	France	26.39	Q
4	2	Brenden Hall	Australia	27.27	
5	6	Cody Bureau	United States	27.32	
6	7	David Taylor	Barbados	46.38	

==== Heat 3 ====
Rank	Lane	Name	Nationality	Time	Notes
1	4	Matthew Cowdrey	Australia	25.63	Q
2	3	Tamás Sors	Hungary	26.87	Q
3	5	Andriy Sirovatchenko	Ukraine	26.99	
4	6	Michael Auprince	Australia	27.24	
5	2	Iurii Martynov	Ukraine	27.90	
	7	Hassani Ahamada Djae	Comoros	DSQ	

=== Final ===
Competed at 20:24.

Rank	Lane	Name	Nationality	Time	Notes
1st place, gold medalist(s)	4	Matthew Cowdrey	Australia	25.13	WR
2nd place, silver medalist(s)	5	Tamás Tóth	Hungary	25.75	
3rd place, bronze medalist(s)	3	Jose Antonio Mari Alcaraz	Spain	25.93	
4	6	Takuro Yamada	Japan	26.22	
5	2	Sami El Gueddari	France	26.32	
6	7	Andriy Kalyna	Ukraine	26.49	
7	8	Tamás Sors	Hungary	26.79	
8	1	Csaba Meilinger	Hungary	26.86	

'Q = qualified for final. WR = World Record. DSQ = Disqualified.
