= Swimming at the 2012 Summer Paralympics – Men's 400 metre freestyle S9 =

Event at the 2012 Summer Paralympics

Men's 400m Freestyle S9 at the XIV Paralympic Games
- Venue: London Aquatics Centre
- Dates: 4 September 2012
- Competitors: 11 from 10 nations
- Winning time: 4:10.88

Medalists
1st place, gold medalist(s)		Brenden Hall	Australia
2nd place, silver medalist(s)		Tamás Sors	Hungary
3rd place, bronze medalist(s)		Federico Morlacchi	Italy

The men's 400m freestyle S9 event at the 2012 Summer Paralympics took place at the London Aquatics Centre on 4 September. There were two heats, and the swimmers with the eight fastest times advanced to the final.

== Results ==
=== Heats ===
The heat's started at 10:05.

==== Heat 1 ====
Rank	Lane	Name	Nationality	Time	Notes
1	4	Jose Antonio Mari Alcaraz	Spain	4:23.88	Q
2	6	Federico Morlacchi	Italy	4:24.06	Q
3	3	Tamás Sors	Hungary	4:24.34	Q
4	5	James Crisp	Great Britain	4:26.03	Q
5	2	Michael Prout	United States	4:33.91	

==== Heat 2 ====
Rank	Lane	Name	Nationality	Time	Notes
1	4	Brenden Hall	Australia	4:21.69	Q
2	5	Jesus Collado	Spain	4:23.57	Q
3	2	David Grachat	Portugal	4:24.10	Q
4	6	Kasper Zysek	Denmark	4:24.27	Q
5	3	Kristijan Vincetic	Croatia	4:37.39	
6	7	Eduard Samarin	Russia	4:38.10	

=== Final ===
The final started at 17:59.

Rank	Lane	Name	Nationality	Time	Notes
1st place, gold medalist(s)	4	Brenden Hall	Australia	4:10.88	WR
2nd place, silver medalist(s)	1	Tamás Sors	Hungary	4:17.95	
3rd place, bronze medalist(s)	6	Federico Morlacchi	Italy	4:18.55	
4	3	Jose Antonio Mari Alcaraz	Spain	4:18.98	
5	5	Jesus Collado	Spain	4:19.06	
6	2	David Grachat	Portugal	4:21.94	
7	7	Kasper Zysek	Denmark	4:23.13	
8	8	James Crisp	Great Britain	4:26.61	

Q = qualified for final. WR = World Record.
