= Swimming at the 2008 Summer Paralympics – Men's 400 metre freestyle S9 =

Men's 400m Freestyle S9 at the XIII Paralympic Games
- Venue: Beijing National Aquatics Center
- Dates: 12 September
- Competitors: 13 from 8 nations
- Winning time: 4:17.02

Medalists
1st place, gold medalist(s)		Jesus Collado	Spain
2nd place, silver medalist(s)		Matthew Cowdrey	Australia
3rd place, bronze medalist(s)		Tamás Sors	Hungary

The men's 400m freestyle S9 event at the 2008 Summer Paralympics took place at the Beijing National Aquatics Center on 12 September. There were two heats; the swimmers with the eight fastest times advanced to the final.

== Results ==
=== Heats ===
Competed from 10:58.

==== Heat 1 ====
Rank	Name	Nationality	Time	Notes
1	Tamás Sors	Hungary	4:26.21	Q
2	Matthew Cowdrey	Australia	4:27.26	Q
3	Michael Prout	United States	4:28.25	Q
4	Takuro Yamada	Japan	4:28.98	Q
5	Taras Yastremskyy	Ukraine	4:36.97	
6	Jarrett Perry	United States	4:38.55	

==== Heat 2 ====
Rank	Name	Nationality	Time	Notes
1	Brenden Hall	Australia	4:23.35	Q, PR
2	Jesus Collado	Spain	4:25.05	Q
3	Sam Bramham	Australia	4:25.67	Q
4	Florian Moll	Germany	4:30.15	Q
5	Mark Barr	United States	4:30.48	
6	Jose Antonio Mari	Spain	4:36.75	
7	Guo Zhi	China	4:47.47	

=== Final ===
Competed at 20:08.

Rank	Name	Nationality	Time	Notes
1st place, gold medalist(s)	Jesus Collado	Spain	4:17.02	WR
2nd place, silver medalist(s)	Matthew Cowdrey	Australia	4:17.28	
3rd place, bronze medalist(s)	Tamás Sors	Hungary	4:20.26	
4	Sam Bramham	Australia	4:21.35	
5	Brenden Hall	Australia	4:22.19	
6	Takuro Yamada	Japan	4:25.78	
7	Michael Prout	United States	4:29.44	
8	Florian Moll	Germany	4:29.67	

Q = qualified for final. WR = World Record. PR = Paralympic Record.
