= Swimming at the 2008 Summer Paralympics – Men's 100 metre backstroke S9 =

Men's 100m Backstroke S9 at the XIII Paralympic Games
- Venue: Beijing National Aquatics Center
- Dates: 13 September
- Competitors: 10 from 7 nations
- Winning time: 1:03.34

Medalists
1st place, gold medalist(s)		Matthew Cowdrey	Australia
2nd place, silver medalist(s)		Guo Zhi	China
3rd place, bronze medalist(s)		Jarrett Perry	United States

The men's 100m backstroke S9 event at the 2008 Summer Paralympics took place at the Beijing National Aquatics Center on 13 September. There were two heats; the swimmers with the eight fastest times advanced to the final.

== Results ==
=== Heats ===
Competed from 09:39.

==== Heat 1 ====
Rank	Name	Nationality	Time	Notes
1	Jarrett Perry	United States	1:03.47	Q, WR
2	Cody Bureau	United States	1:06.42	Q
3	Jesus Collado	Spain	1:09.04	Q
4	Lamri	Indonesia	1:12.13	
5	Juan Pablo Rosatti	Argentina	1:12.40	

==== Heat 2 ====
Rank	Name	Nationality	Time	Notes
1	Matthew Cowdrey	Australia	1:05.60	Q
2	Guo Zhi	China	1:05.75	Q
3	Andriy Sirovatchenko	Ukraine	1:08.13	Q
4	Michael Prout	United States	1:08.72	Q
5	Wang Renjie	China	1:09.28	Q

=== Final ===
Competed at 18:03.

Rank	Name	Nationality	Time	Notes
1st place, gold medalist(s)	Matthew Cowdrey	Australia	1:03.34	WR
2nd place, silver medalist(s)	Guo Zhi	China	1:03.59	
3rd place, bronze medalist(s)	Jarrett Perry	United States	1:03.66	
4	Jesus Collado	Spain	1:05.45	
5	Cody Bureau	United States	1:05.47	
6	Andriy Sirovatchenko	Ukraine	1:06.83	
7	Wang Renjie	China	1:07.45	
8	Michael Prout	United States	1:08.09	

Q = qualified for final. WR = World Record.
