= Swimming at the 2004 Summer Paralympics – Men's 400 metre freestyle S9 =

Men's 400m Freestyle S9 at the XII Paralympic Games
- Paralympic Swimming
- Venue: Olympic Aquatic Centre
- Dates: 24 September 2004
- Competitors: 15 from 11 nations
- Winning time: 4:25.42

Medalists
1st place, gold medalist(s)		Michael Prout	United States
2nd place, silver medalist(s)		James Crisp	Great Britain
3rd place, bronze medalist(s)		Matthew Cowdrey	Australia

The Men's 400 metre freestyle S9 swimming event at the 2004 Summer Paralympics was competed on 24 September. It was won by Michael Prout, representing United States.

== 1st round ==
He Qualified for final round

Heat 1

24 Sept. 2004, morning session

Rank	Athlete	Time	Notes
1	Michael Prout (USA)	4:26.73	
2	Mark Barr (USA)	4:35.94	
3	Brad Sales (CAN)	4:36.64	
4	Taras Yastremskyy (UKR)	4:41.28	
5	Fabiano Machado (BRA)	4:41.61	
6	Ryuji Sakimoto (JPN)	4:59.14	
7	Li Rong (CHN)	5:09.74	

Heat 2

24 Sept. 2004, morning session

Rank	Athlete	Time	Notes
1	James Crisp (GBR)	4:35.56	
2	Matthew Cowdrey (AUS)	4:37.93	
3	Wim de Paepe (BEL)	4:38.14	
4	Jarrett Perry (USA)	4:38.65	
5	Dennis Storgaard (DEN)	4:39.24	
6	Takuro Yamada (JPN)	4:40.18	
7	Andrew Haley (CAN)	4:41.56	
8	Admir Ahmethodzic (BIH)	5:01.64	

== Final round ==
24 Sept. 2004, evening session

Rank	Athlete	Time	Notes
1st place, gold medalist(s)	Michael Prout (USA)	4:25.42	PR
2nd place, silver medalist(s)	James Crisp (GBR)	4:28.38	
3rd place, bronze medalist(s)	Matthew Cowdrey (AUS)	4:31.80	
4	Mark Barr (USA)	4:33.60	
5	Brad Sales (CAN)	4:34.16	
6	Wim de Paepe (BEL)	4:37.52	
7	Jarrett Perry (USA)	4:39.12	
8	Dennis Storgaard (DEN)	4:39.20	
