= Swimming at the 2010 Commonwealth Games – Men's 100 metre freestyle S10 =

The Men's 100 metre freestyle S10 event at the 2010 Commonwealth Games took place on 8 October 2010, at the SPM Swimming Pool Complex, Delhi. In this event, Benoît Huot of Canada and Matthew John Cowdrey of Australia created games record in S10 and S9 categories respectively.

== Records ==
World Record	50.87	Andre Brasil	BRA	Eindhoven, Netherlands	17 August 2010
Games Record	54.85	Benoît Huot	CAN	Delhi, India	9 October 2010

== Heats ==
=== Heat 1 ===
Rank	Lane	Name	Class	Nationality	Time	Notes
1	4	Andrew Pasterfield	S10	Australia	55.16	Q
2	5	Matthew John Cowdrey	S9	Australia	56.61	Q
3	3	Fraidden Dawan	S10	Malaysia	1:04.60	Q
4	6	Chetan Giridhar Raut	S10	India	1:05.59	q
5	2	Scody Victor	S9	Mauritius	1:21.66	
6	7	Arachchillage S. Galpatha	S10	Sri Lanka	1:32.51	

=== Heat 2 ===
Rank	Lane	Name	Class	Nationality	Time	Notes
1	4	Benoît Huot	S10	Canada	54.85	Q
2	5	Robert Welbourn	S10	England	55.94	Q
3	3	Laurence McGivern	S9	Northern Ireland	1:03.56	Q
4	2	Rimo Saha	S10	India	1:07.62	q
5	6	Niluka Thilakaratne	S10	Sri Lanka	1:07.90	
6	7	Eugene Fegus Barasa Wafula	S9	Kenya	2:02.36	

== Finals ==
Rank	Lane	Name	Class	Nationality	Time	Notes
1st place, gold medalist(s)	4	Benoît Huot	S10	Canada	53.70	GR
2nd place, silver medalist(s)	5	Andrew Pasterfield	S10	Australia	55.04	
3rd place, bronze medalist(s)	3	Robert Welbourn	S10	England	55.10	
4	6	Matthew John Cowdrey	S9	Australia	55.57	GR
5	2	Laurence McGivern	S9	Northern Ireland	1:03.31	
6	7	Fraidden Dawan	S10	Malaysia	1:05.17	
7	1	Chetan Giridhar Raut	S10	India	1:05.27	
8	8	Rimo Saha	S10	India	1:07.80	
