= Swimming at the 2008 Summer Paralympics – Men's 200 metre individual medley SM9 =

Men's 200m Individual Medley SM9 at the XIII Paralympic Games
- Venue: Beijing National Aquatics Center
- Dates: 11 September
- Competitors: 9 from 7 nations
- Winning time: 2:13.60

Medalists
| 1st place, gold medalist(s) | | Matthew Cowdrey | Australia |
| 2nd place, silver medalist(s) | | Andriy Kalyna | Ukraine |
| 3rd place, bronze medalist(s) | | Cody Bureau | United States |

The men's 200m individual medley SM9 event at the 2008 Summer Paralympics took place at the Beijing National Aquatics Center on 11 September. There were two heats; the swimmers with the eight fastest times advanced to the final.

== Results ==
=== Heats ===
Competed from 10:12.

==== Heat 1 ====
| Rank | Name | Nationality | Time | Notes |
|---|---|---|---|---|
| 1 | Andriy Kalyna | Ukraine | 2:20.46 | Q, PR |
| 2 | Tamás Sors | Hungary | 2:22.98 | Q |
| 3 | Takuro Yamada | Japan | 2:25.44 | Q |
| 4 | Michael Prout | United States | 2:25.65 | Q |

==== Heat 2 ====
| Rank | Name | Nationality | Time | Notes |
|---|---|---|---|---|
| 1 | Matthew Cowdrey | Australia | 2:20.62 | Q |
| 2 | Cody Bureau | United States | 2:27.30 | Q |
| 3 | David Grachat | Portugal | 2:28.75 | Q |
| | Guo Zhi | China | | DQ |
| | Jarrett Perry | United States | | DQ |

=== Final ===
Competed at 18:19.

| Rank | Name | Nationality | Time | Notes |
|---|---|---|---|---|
| 1st place, gold medalist(s) | Matthew Cowdrey | Australia | 2:13.60 | WR |
| 2nd place, silver medalist(s) | Andriy Kalyna | Ukraine | 2:17.21 | |
| 3rd place, bronze medalist(s) | Cody Bureau | United States | 2:20.21 | |
| 4 | Tamás Sors | Hungary | 2:21.42 | |
| 5 | Takuro Yamada | Japan | 2:24.20 | |
| 6 | Michael Prout | United States | 2:25.56 | |
| 7 | David Grachat | Portugal | 2:26.13 | |

Q = qualified for final. WR = World Record. PR = Paralympic Record. DQ = Disqualified.
