= David Grachat =

Portuguese Paralympic swimmer

Personal information
- Nationality: Portuguese
- Born: 21 January 1987 (age 39) Lisbon, Portugal

Sport
- Sport: Swimming
- Strokes: Freestyle
Medal record
Men's para swimming
Representing Portugal
IPC World Championships
Silver medal – second place	2017 Mexico City	400 m freestyle – S9
Bronze medal – third place	2015 Glasgow	100 m freestyle – S9
IPC European Championships
Silver medal – second place	2009 Reykjavik	400 m freestyle – S9
Bronze medal – third place	2009 Reykjavik	100 m freestyle – S9
Bronze medal – third place	2014 Eindhoven	400 m freestyle – S9
Bronze medal – third place	2016 Funchal	400 m freestyle – S9

David Realista Grachat (born 21 January 1987) is a Portuguese para-swimmer, competing in S9 classification events. He has competed at four Summer Paralympic Games, 2008 in Beijing, 2012 in London, 2016 in Rio and 2021 in Tokyo. Grachat has won medals at both European and World level, and specializes in the 400m freestyle.

== Personal history ==
Grachat was born in Lisbon, Portugal in 1987. He was born without a left hand.

== Swimming career ==
Grachat took up swimming as a youth as his parents wanted him to improve his health. He was classified as a S9 swimmer and made his international debut for Portugal in 2005. Grachat made his Paralympic debut at the 2008 Games in Beijing competing in the 50 m and 100 m freestyle S9 events and the 200 m individual medley (SM9). In the 50 m he failed to qualify for the finals finishing fourth in his heat. He performed better in the other events reaching the finals of both. He finished 6th in the 200m and 7th in the individual medley.

In 2012 Grachat was selected for his second Paralympic Games, held in London. He entered four events, 50 m, 100 m and 400 m freestyle S9 races and the SM9 200m individual medley. He progressed through only one of the heats, the 400m freestyle, setting a national record of 4:24.10 to finish third in his race. At the final he bettered his own national record with a time of 4:21.94, but this was only good enough for a sixth-place finish.

Grachat's first international success came in his favoured 400 m freestyle at the 2014 IPC Swimming European Championships in Eindhoven. There he posted a time of 4.26.61 to win the bronze medal. He bettered this the following year at the 2015 IPC Swimming World Championships in Glasgow where he won his first World Championship medal with a bronze in the Men's 400 metre freestyle. In the buildup to the 2016 Summer Paralympics in Rio, Grachat competed at the 2016 IPC Swimming European Championships, held on home soil in Funchal. He again claimed a third place spot to take his second career European bronze.
