= Swimming at the 2010 Commonwealth Games – Men's 50 metre freestyle S9 =

The Men's 50 metre freestyle event at the 2010 Commonwealth Games took place on 6 October 2010, at the SPM Swimming Pool Complex.

Two heats were held, with most containing the maximum number of swimmers (eight). The top eight from there qualified for the finals.

== Heats ==
=== Heat 1 ===
Rank	Lane	Name	Nationality	Time	Notes
1	4	Simon Miller	England	27.00	Q
2	5	Blake Cochrane	Australia	27.81	Q
3	3	Sachin Verma	India	29.05	Q
4	6	Chen Leow	Singapore	30.45	
5	2	Sunil Galpatha	Sri Lanka	31.45	
6	7	Jean Laperotine	Mauritius	38.45	
–	1	Eugene Wafula	Kenya		

=== Heat 2 ===
Rank	Lane	Name	Nationality	Time	Notes
1	4	Matthew Cowdrey	Australia	25.66	Q
2	3	Benjamin Austin	Australia	27.68	Q
3	5	Prasanta Karmakar	India	27.69	Q
4	6	Sean Fraser	Scotland	28.60	Q
5	2	Laurence McGivern	Northern Ireland	28.84	Q
6	1	Rajesh Shinde	India	32.96	
7	7	Scody Victor	Mauritius	34.86	

== Final ==
Rank	Lane	Name	Nationality	Time	Notes
1st place, gold medalist(s)	4	Matthew Cowdrey	Australia	25.33	WR
2nd place, silver medalist(s)	5	Simon Miller	England	26.70	
3rd place, bronze medalist(s)	6	Prasanta Karmakar	India	27.48	
4	3	Benjamin Austin	Australia	27.53	CG
5	2	Blake Cochrane	Australia	27.68	
6	7	Sean Fraser	Scotland	28.63	
7	1	Laurence McGivern	Northern Ireland	28.95	
8	8	Sachin Verma	India	29.37	
