= Krzysztof Paterka =

Polish Paralympic swimmer

Personal information
- Born: 19 August 1986 (age 39) Poznań, Poland
- Height: 1.89 m (6 ft 2 in)
- Weight: 78 kg (172 lb)

Sport
- Country: Poland
- Sport: Paralympic swimming
- Disability class: S9, SB8, SM9
- Event: Breaststroke
Medal record
Paralympic swimming
Representing Poland
Paralympic Games
Bronze medal – third place	2004 Athens	4x100m medley relay 34pts
World Championships
Bronze medal – third place	2006 Durban	100m breaststroke SB8
Bronze medal – third place	2010 Eindhoven	100m breaststroke SB8
Bronze medal – third place	2013 Montreal	100m breaststroke SB8
European Championships
Silver medal – second place	2011 Berlin	100m breaststroke SB8

Krzysztof Paterka (born 19 August 1986) is a Polish retired Paralympic swimmer who specialises in the breaststroke and competed in international elite competitions. He is a Paralympic bronze medalist, three-time World bronze medalist and a European silver medalist. He was born without his left forearm and was diagnosed with temporal lobe epilepsy as a young child.
