= Matt Cowdrey =

Australian swimmer and politician

Matt Cowdrey OAM
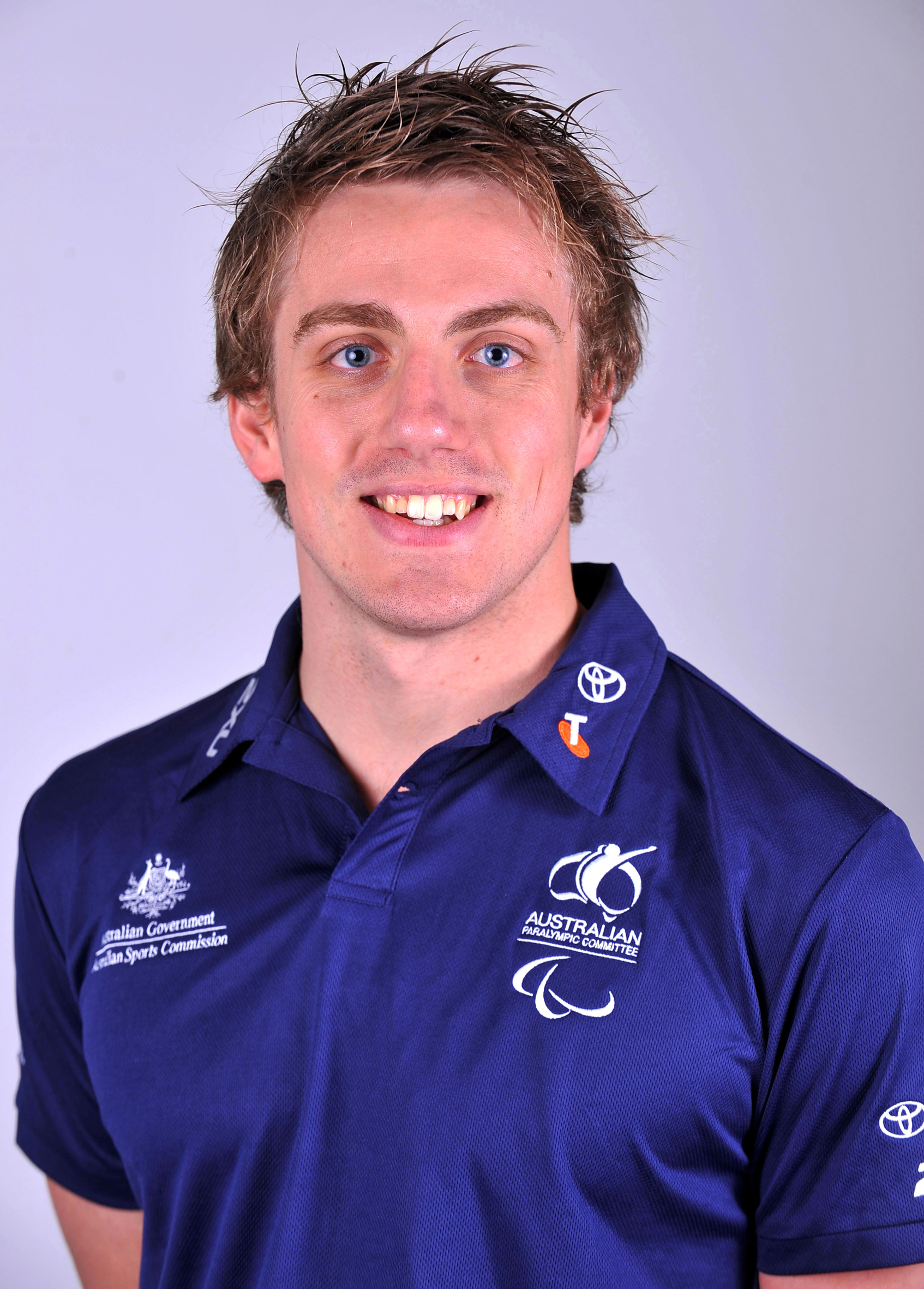
- 2012 Australian Paralympic team portrait of Cowdrey

Member of the South Australian Parliament for Colton
- In office 17 March 2018 – 21 March 2026
- Preceded by: Paul Caica
- Succeeded by: Aria Bolkus

Personal details
- Born: Matthew John Cowdrey; 22 December 1988 (age 37) Adelaide, South Australia
- Party: Liberal Party
- Sports career
- Height: 182 cm (6 ft 0 in)
- Sport: Swimming
- Strokes: Freestyle, Backstroke, Butterfly, Medley
- Classifications: S9, SB8, SM9
- Club: Marion
Medal record
Event	1st	2nd	3rd
Paralympic Games	13	7	3
World Championships (LC)	16	3	2
World Championships (SC)	7	2	0
Commonwealth Games	3	1	0
Total	39	13	5
Men's paralympic swimming
Representing Australia
Paralympic Games
Gold medal – first place	2004 Athens	100 m freestyle S9
Gold medal – first place	2004 Athens	200 m medley SM9
Gold medal – first place	2004 Athens	4×100 m medley
Gold medal – first place	2008 Beijing	50 m freestyle S9
Gold medal – first place	2008 Beijing	100 m freestyle S9
Gold medal – first place	2008 Beijing	100 m backstroke S9
Gold medal – first place	2008 Beijing	200 m medley SM9
Gold medal – first place	2008 Beijing	4×100 m medley
Gold medal – first place	2012 London	50 m freestyle S9
Gold medal – first place	2012 London	100 m freestyle S9
Gold medal – first place	2012 London	100 m backstroke S9
Gold medal – first place	2012 London	200 m medley SM9
Gold medal – first place	2012 London	4×100 m freestyle
Silver medal – second place	2004 Athens	100 m butterfly S9
Silver medal – second place	2004 Athens	4×100 m freestyle
Silver medal – second place	2008 Beijing	100 m butterfly S9
Silver medal – second place	2008 Beijing	400 m freestyle S9
Silver medal – second place	2008 Beijing	4×100 m freestyle
Silver medal – second place	2012 London	100 m breaststroke SB8
Silver medal – second place	2012 London	100 m butterfly S9
Bronze medal – third place	2004 Athens	50 m freestyle S9
Bronze medal – third place	2004 Athens	400 m freestyle S9
Bronze medal – third place	2012 London	4×100 m medley
World Championships (LC)
Gold medal – first place	2006 Durban	50 m freestyle S9
Gold medal – first place	2006 Durban	100 m freestyle S9
Gold medal – first place	2006 Durban	100 m butterfly S9
Gold medal – first place	2006 Durban	200 medley SM9
Gold medal – first place	2006 Durban	4×100 m medley
Gold medal – first place	2010 Eindhoven	50 m freestyle S9
Gold medal – first place	2010 Eindhoven	100 m freestyle S9
Gold medal – first place	2010 Eindhoven	100 m backstroke S9
Gold medal – first place	2010 Eindhoven	200 m medley SM9
Gold medal – first place	2010 Eindhoven	4×100 m freestyle
Gold medal – first place	2010 Eindhoven	4×100 m medley
Gold medal – first place	2013 Montreal	50 m freestyle S9
Gold medal – first place	2013 Montreal	100 m freestyle S9
Gold medal – first place	2013 Montreal	100 m backstroke S9
Gold medal – first place	2013 Montreal	200 m medley SM9
Gold medal – first place	2013 Montreal	4×100 m freestyle
Silver medal – second place	2006 Durban	100 m backstroke S9
Silver medal – second place	2006 Durban	4×100 m freestyle
Silver medal – second place	2010 Eindhoven	100 m butterfly S9
Bronze medal – third place	2006 Durban	400 m freestyle S9
Bronze medal – third place	2013 Montreal	100 m butterfly S9
World Championships (SC)
Gold medal – first place	2009 Rio de Janeiro	50 m freestyle S9
Gold medal – first place	2009 Rio de Janeiro	100 m freestyle S9
Gold medal – first place	2009 Rio de Janeiro	100 m backstroke S9
Gold medal – first place	2009 Rio de Janeiro	100 m medley SM9
Gold medal – first place	2009 Rio de Janeiro	200 m medley SM9
Gold medal – first place	2009 Rio de Janeiro	4×100 m freestyle
Gold medal – first place	2009 Rio de Janeiro	4×100 m medley
Silver medal – second place	2009 Rio de Janeiro	100 m breaststroke SB9
Silver medal – second place	2009 Rio de Janeiro	100 m butterfly S9
Commonwealth Games
Gold medal – first place	2006 Melbourne	50 m freestyle EAD
Gold medal – first place	2006 Melbourne	100 m freestyle EAD
Gold medal – first place	2010 Delhi	50 m freestyle S9
Silver medal – second place	2014 Glasgow	100 m freestyle S9

Matthew John Cowdrey (born 22 December 1988) is an Australian politician and Paralympic swimmer. He presently holds numerous world records. He has a congenital amputation of his left arm; it stops just below the elbow. Cowdrey competed at the 2004 Paralympic Games, 2006 Commonwealth Games, 2008 Paralympic Games, 2010 Commonwealth Games, and the 2012 Paralympic Games. After the 2012 London Games, he is the most successful Australian Paralympian, having won thirteen Paralympic gold medals and twenty three Paralympic medals in total. On 10 February 2015, Cowdrey announced his retirement from swimming.

Matthew Cowdrey contested and won the seat of Colton at the 2018 state election in South Australia for the Liberal Party. In June 2025, Cowdrey announced that he would not recontest Colton at the 2026 state election.

== Personal ==
Cowdrey was born on 22 December 1988 with part of his arm missing due to a congenital amputation. He attended Endeavour College and played basketball when he was younger. He moved to Canberra and started swimming for the Australian Institute of Sport, while continuing to represent the Norwood Swimming Club of Adelaide on the club level. In 2011, he also represented Kawana Waters Swimming Club. He finished his career swimming for the Marion Swimming Club.

In April 2015, Cowdrey graduated from the University of Adelaide with a double degree in law and media. In 2013, he undertook a three-month internship with U.S. Congresswoman Ileana Ros-Lehtinen. In 2015, at the time of his retirement from swimming, he was working as a management consultant for KPMG in Adelaide.

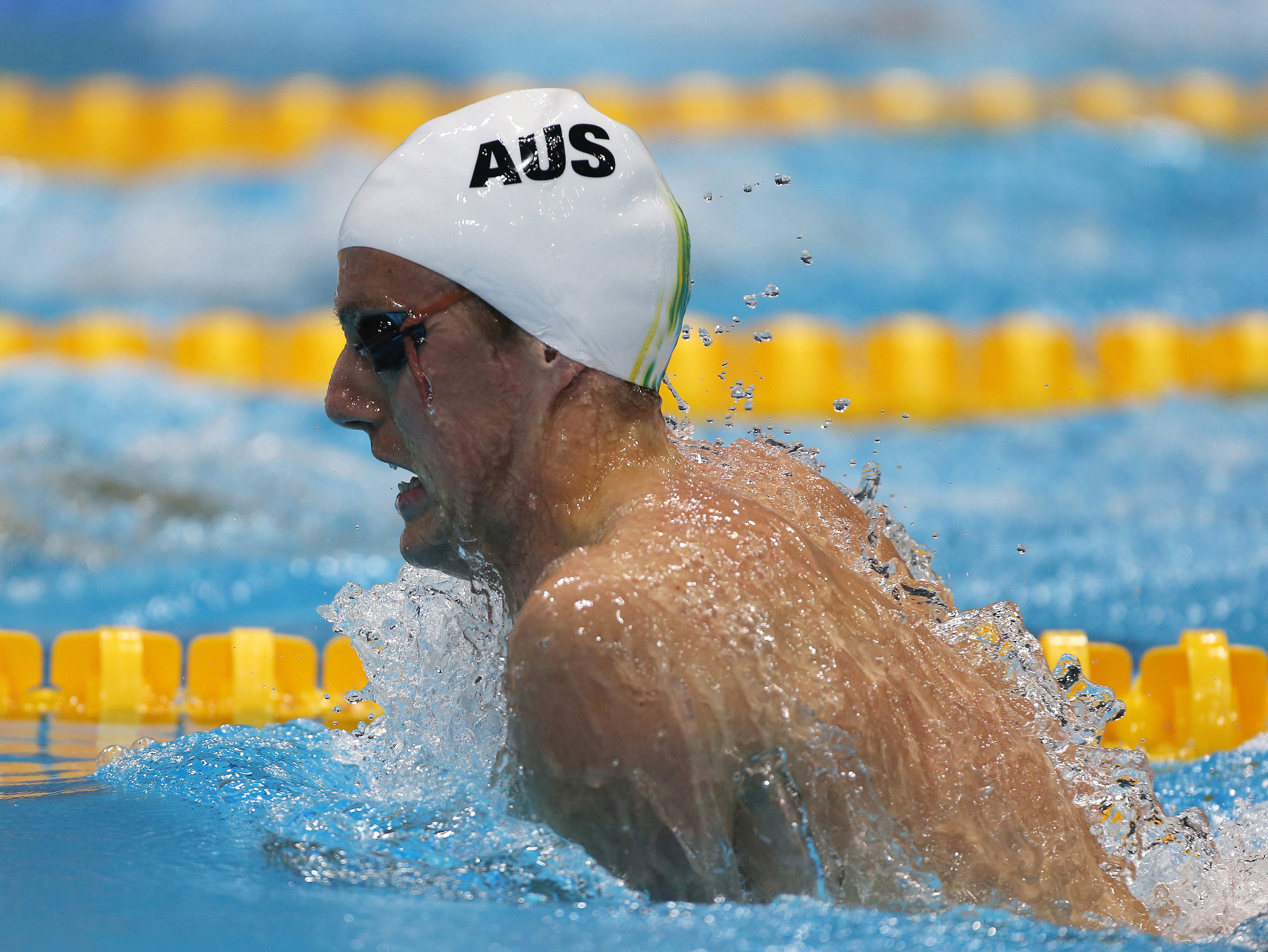
Cowdrey at the 2012 London Paralympics

== Swimming ==
Cowdrey competes in the International Paralympic Committee's S9 (freestyle, backstroke and butterfly,) SB8 (breaststroke), and SM9 (individual medley) classifications, which comprise swimmers with a severe leg weakness, swimmers with slight coordination problems and swimmers with one limb loss. Cowdrey started swimming when he was five years old, and doing so competitively soon after in 1994. He broke his first Australian open record when he was eleven years old, and set his first world record at the age of thirteen.

=== 2004 ===
Cowdrey was one of the youngest Australian competitors at the 2004 Paralympics. At the 2004 Games, he won three gold medals in the men's 4×100-metre medley relay, the 100-metre freestyle S9, and the 200-metre individual medley SM9, for which he received a Medal of the Order of Australia. Cowdrew also won silver medals in the 100-metre butterfly S9 and the 4×100-metre freestyle relay, and bronze medals in the 50-metre freestyle S9 and the 400-metre freestyle S9.

=== 2005 ===
At the 2005 Australian Open, Cowdrey set two world records en route to winning seven gold medals and two bronze medals.

=== 2006 ===
At the 2006 Melbourne Commonwealth Games Trials, Cowdrey set world records and won gold medals in four events: the 200-metre individual medley mixed disability classification, the 100-metre backstroke mixed disability classification, the 50-metre backstroke mixed disability classification, and the 50-metre butterfly mixed disability classification. Additionally, he won gold medals in two other events: the 100-metre freestyle mixed disability classification and the 50-metre freestyle mixed disability classification. At the 2006 Commonwealth Games Trials – Team Qualification Races, he won a gold medal and set a world record in the 100-metre freestyle Elite Athlete with a Disability (EAD) event, and won a gold medal in the 50-metre freestyle (EAD) event.

Cowdrey competed at the 2006 Commonwealth Games in Melbourne, Victoria, where he set two world records and won gold medals in the 50-metre freestyle and 100-metre freestyle events. He was Australia's only male non-relay individual swimming gold medalist in the 2006 Commonwealth Games. At the 2006 World Championships, he set three world records while winning three gold medals, two silver medals and bronze. In 2008, at the Australian Swimming Championships, he won gold medals four events:the 50-metre freestyle, 100-metre freestyle, 100-metre backstroke and 100-metre butterfly. At those same games, he won two silver medals in the 200-metre individual medley and 400-metre freestyle events. These Games had limited opportunities for Paralympic swimmers as not all events were on the event programme.

At the 2006 IPC Swimming World Championships, in Durban, South Africa, Cowdrey won gold medals in five events: the 50-metre freestyle S9, the 100-metre freestyle S9, the 100-metre butterfly S9, the 200-metre individual medley SM9, and the 4×100-metre medley relay (34 points). He also won silver medals in the 100-metre backstroke S9 and the 4×100-metre freestyle relay (34 points), and a bronze medal in the 400-metre freestyle S9.

=== 2008 ===
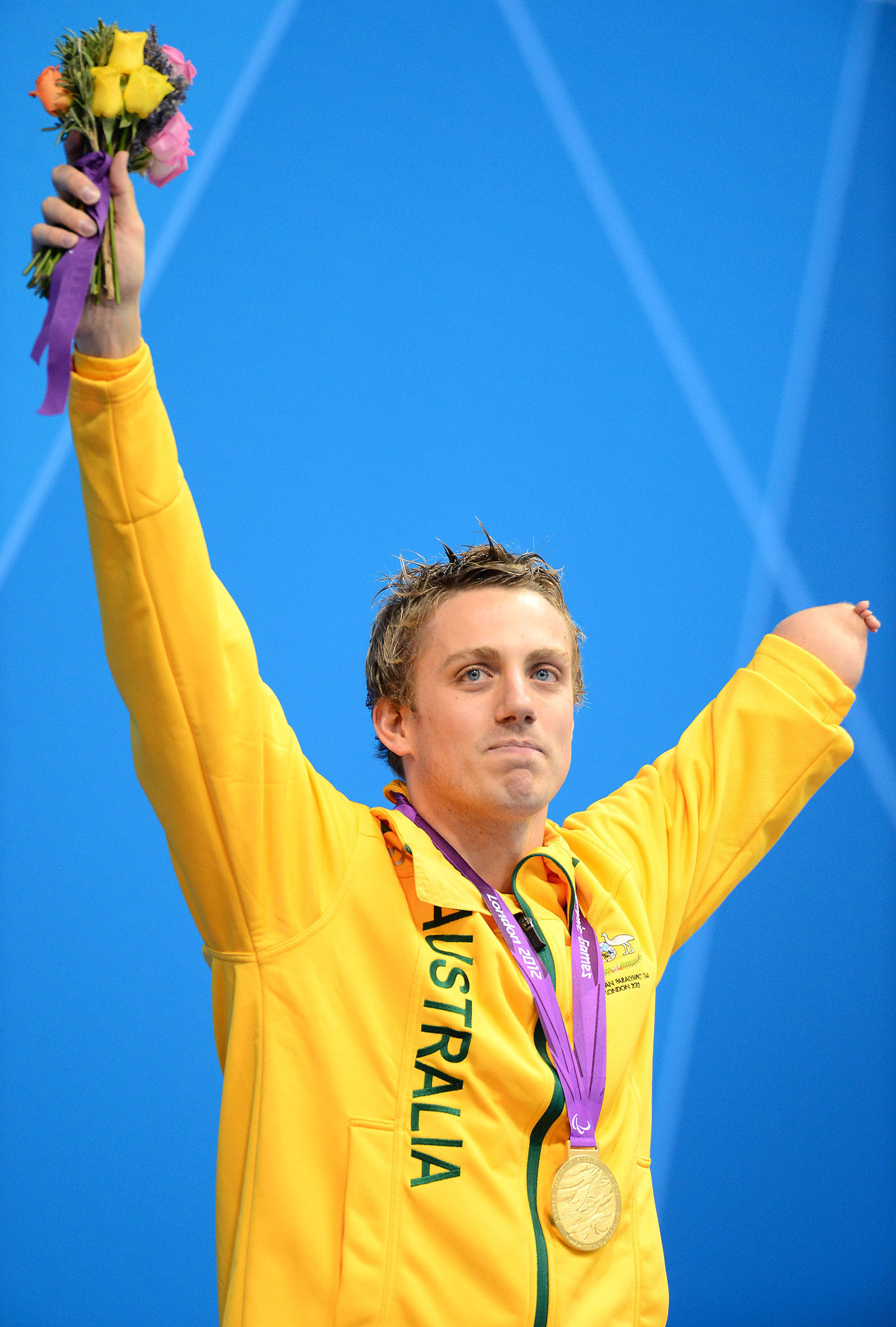
Cowdrey, gold medallist, at the 2012 London Paralympics

At the 2008 Summer Paralympics, Cowdrey picked up five gold medals, winning the 50-metre freestyle S9, 100-metre freestyle S9, 100-metre backstroke S9, 200-metre individual medley-SM9, and 4×100-metre medley relay events, all in world-record time. He won three silver medals in the 100-metre butterfly S9, 400-metre freestyle S9, and 4×100-metre freestyle relay events. He also carried Australia's flag during the closing ceremonies for the Games. For his performance at the Games, Cowdrey won Best Male at the Paralympic Sport Awards.

=== 2009 ===
At the 2009 IPC Short Course World Championships in Rio de Janeiro, Brazil, Cowdrey won seven gold medals and two silver medals. In 2009, he competed in his first international competition against able-bodied swimmers in Tucson, Arizona.

=== 2010 ===
At the 2010 IPC Swimming World Championships, Cowdrey, who was classified as an S9 swimmer, won six gold medals and one silver medal. One of the medals was in the men's 4×100-metre relay race. At the 2010 Delhi Commonwealth Games, he won a gold medal in the 50-metre freestyle S9 event in a world record time of 25.33 seconds, which is still standing as of February 2012.

=== 2011 ===
In April 2011, he participated in the Telstra Australian Swimming Championships. In July 2011, he participated at the Australian Short Course Championships. In August 2011, he participated in the Pan Pacific Para Swimming Championships. In October 2011, he participated at the 2011 Swimmeroo QLD Long Course. In December, he competed in the Can-Am Swimming Open. A week before the Can-Am Swimming Open, Cowdrey was reclassified for breaststroke from SB9 to SB8. He won a gold medal in the SB8 100-metre breaststroke, with the fourth fastest time posted for the event during 2011 at 1:12.85.

=== 2012 ===
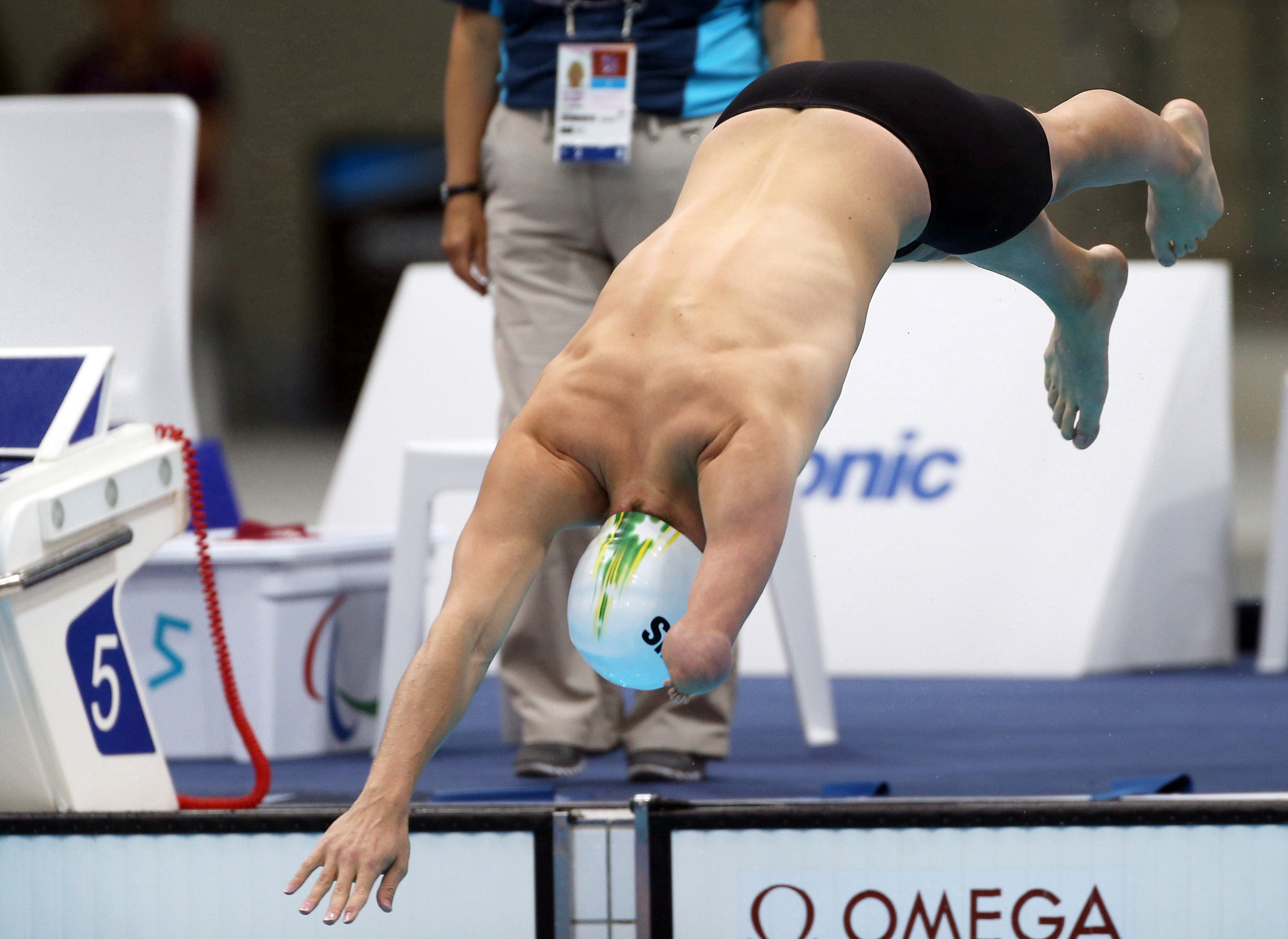
Cowdrey at the 2012 London Paralympics

At the 2012 Summer Paralympics, Cowdrey won gold medals in the 100-metre backstroke S9, 50-metre freestyle S9, 100-metre freestyle S9, 200-metre individual medley SM9, and 4×100-metre freestyle relay (34 points). He also won silver medals in the 100-metre butterfly S9 and 100-metre breaststroke SB8, and a bronze medal in the 4×100-metre medley relay (34 points). Cowdrey became Australia's most successful Paralympian with his victory in the men's 50-metre freestyle S9 event at the 2012 London Games, winning his 11th gold medal and 20th medal overall and surpassing Tim Sullivan in gold medal count and Kingsley Bugarin in overall medal count.

=== 2013 ===
In June 2013, Cowdrey confirmed that he would aim to compete at the 2016 Rio Games. He was back living in Glenelg and training at the South Australian Aquatic Centre. Competing at the 2013 IPC Swimming World Championships in Montreal, Cowdrey won five gold medals in the 50-metre freestyle S9, 100-metre freestyle S9, 100-metre backstroke S9, 200-metre individual medley SM9, and 4×100-metre freestyle relay (34 points), and a bronze medal in the 100-metre butterfly S9.

=== 2014 ===
At the 2014 Glasgow Commonwealth Games, Cowdrey won a silver medal in the 100-metre freestyle S9.

=== Retirement ===
On announcing his retirement from swimming on 10 February 2015, Cowdrey stated: "I have been fortunate to have achieved more than I could ever have dreamed of, and more than I set out to achieve, and more importantly I have enjoyed every minute of my time on the Australian swim team." Glenn Tasker, president of the Australian Paralympic Committee, said, "It has been an absolute privilege to watch Matthew develop from the quiet 15-year-old kid who competed at his first Paralympics in 2004, into one of the greats of Australian Paralympic sport. He has become an outstanding ambassador for the Paralympic movement, a leader of the Paralympic swim team and our most successful athlete ever."

== Post-swimming career ==
Cowdrey was appointed as the team general manager of the Australian team for the 2015 Commonwealth Youth Games held in Samoa and the 2017 Commonwealth Youth Games held in The Bahamas.

In 2017, Cowdrey was preselected to run for the Liberal Party in the Labor-held seat of Colton at the 2018 state election in South Australia. He was re-elected as the member for Colton at the 2022 state election despite the election resulting in the Liberal Party losing Government and returning to Opposition. Cowdrey actually won enough primary votes to retain the seat outright despite the Liberals' collapse in Adelaide. He is the first opposition member for Colton, a noted bellwether seat. Counting its time as Henley Beach, Colton had been held by the government party since its creation in 1970.

In April 2022, he was promoted to the Opposition frontbench as Shadow Treasurer, he also served as Shadow Minister for Sport during his second Parliamentary term. In June 2025, Cowdrey announced that he would not recontest Colton at 2026 state election.

Cowdrey was appointed Deputy Chef de Mission for the Australian Team at the 2026 Commonwealth Games.

In December 2025, Paralympics Australia announced that Cowdrey was appointed to Head of Para-sport System and Partnerships starting in March 2026.

== Recognition ==
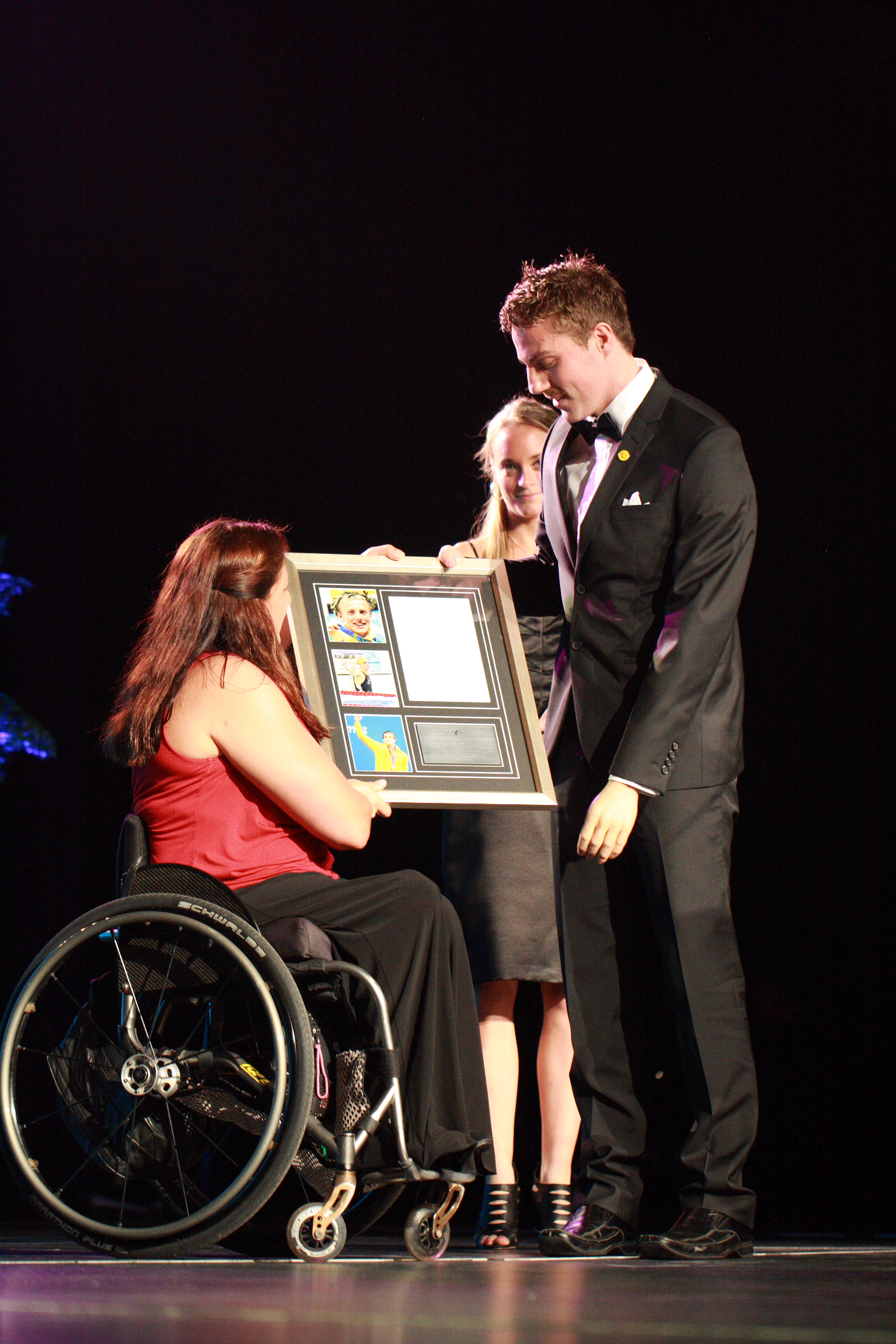
Cowdrey receiving a special presentation at the 2012 Australian Paralympian of the Year ceremony, in recognition of his achievement of winning more Paralympic gold medals than any other Australian

In 2004, at the Australian Paralympian of the Year Awards, he was named the Young Paralympian of the Year. In 2006, Cowdrey won the Commonwealth Sports Award in the category of male Elite Athlete with a Disability (EAD). Swimming Australia named him their Swimmer of the Year with a Disability for four years in a row, from 2004 to 2007. He was also named to Swimming Australia's All-Star Swim Team in 2006 and 2007. Swimming World Magazine has named him their "World Swimmer of the Year with a Disability." In 2009, he was named the Young South Australian of the Year. In 2011, he was inducted into the Australian Institute of Sport's "Best of the Best". Cowdrey was a finalist for the 2012 Australian Paralympian of the Year.

In 2012, The South Australia Aquatic & Leisure Centre decided to name its main competition pool after Cowdrey. The City of Salisbury gave him the keys to the city in 2013. In October 2014, he was inducted into the Path of Champions at the Sydney Olympic Park Aquatic Centre. In 2016, he was awarded Speedo Services to the Australian Swim Team at the Swimming Australia Awards. He is an inductee of the Swimming South Australia Hall of Fame. In 2019, he was inducted into Sport Australia Hall of Fame. In 2022, he was inducted into the Paralympics Australia Hall of Fame. In 2025, he was inducted into Swimming Australia Hall of Fame.

Awards
Preceded by Wang Xiaofu; Daniel Dias	World Disabled Swimmer of the Year; 2007, 2008; 2012	Succeeded by Daniel Dias; Daniel Dias
Parliament of South Australia
Preceded by Paul Caica	Member for Colton; 2018–2026	Succeeded by Aria Bolkus
