= Wim De Paepe =

Belgian Paralympic swimmer

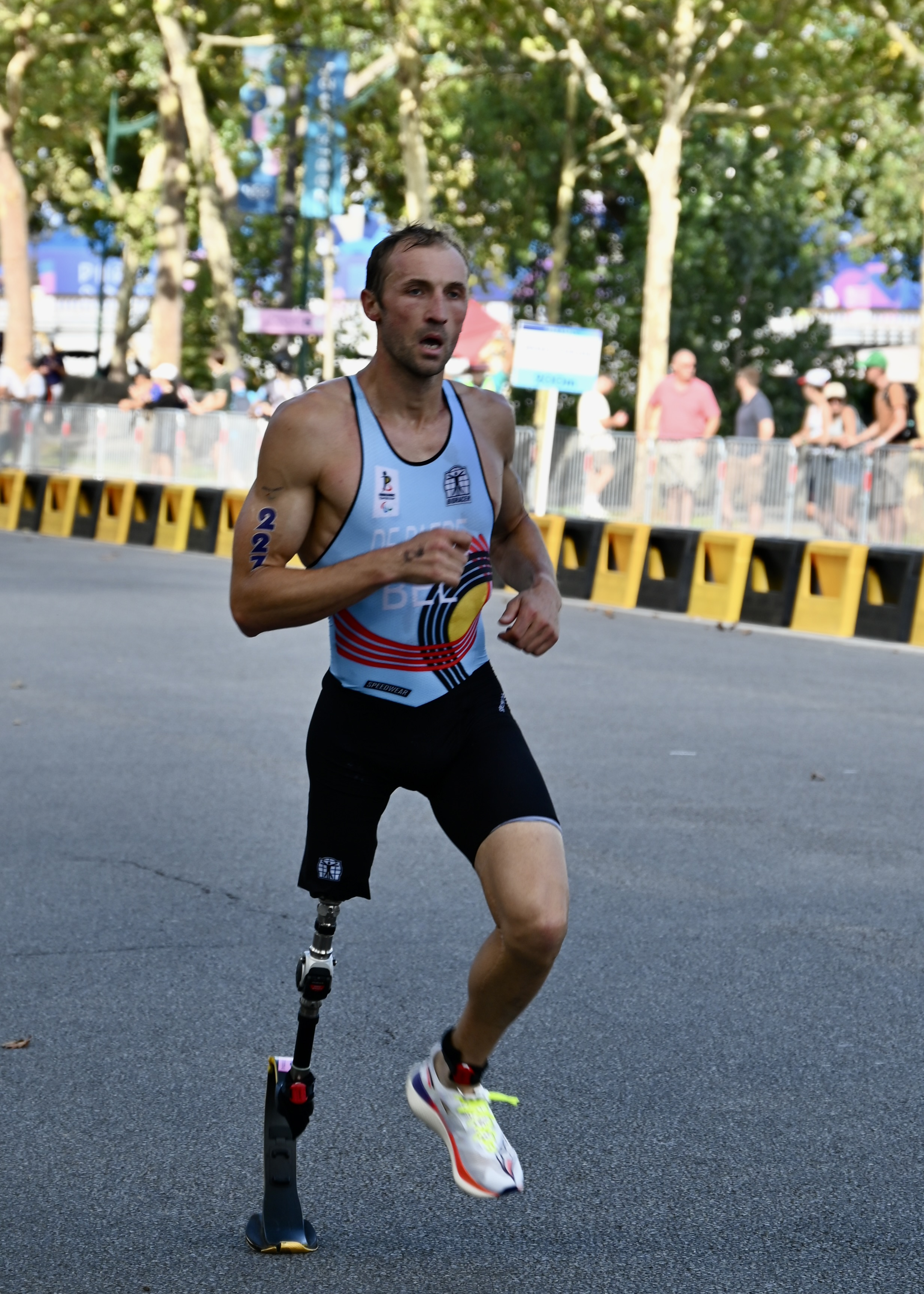
- De Paepe at the 2024 Summer Paralympics

Personal information
- Nationality: Belgian
- Born: 3 January 1985 (age 41) Belgium

Sport
- Sport: Para swimming Paratriathlon
- Club: 3T Triathlon Tenacity Team
Medal record
Men's paratriathlon
Representing Belgium
World Championships
| Gold medal – first place | 2024 Torremolinos | PTS2 |
| Silver medal – second place | 2025 Wollongong | PTS2 |
| Bronze medal – third place | 2021 Abu Dhabi | PTS2 |
| Bronze medal – third place | 2022 Abu Dhabi | PTS2 |
| Bronze medal – third place | 2026 Pontevedra | PTS2 |
European Championships
| Gold medal – first place | 2025 Besançon | PTS2 |
| Silver medal – second place | 2026 Tarragona | PTS2 |
| Bronze medal – third place | 2021 Valencia | PTS2 |
| Bronze medal – third place | 2024 Vichy | PTS2 |

Wim De Paepe (born 1 January 1985) is a Belgian Paralympic swimmer and triathlete. He competes in classification PTS2.

== Biography ==
De Paepe grew up on a farm, specializing the production of strawberries, in the country-side of Bois-de-Nivelles in Hainaut Province, Belgium, in a family of 5, with a brother and a sister. He lost a part of his right leg when he was ten years old in an accident with a farmer's equipment, as a result of which he now wears a prosthetic leg. Sports having always played an important part in his and his family member's lives, he wanted to continue to practice a sport and as his sister was already a swimmer, he took up swimming himself, partly because it did not require any specific equipment partly because it allowed him to learn to live with his new body.

== Personal ==
De Paepe is married and has three sons. He works as a physiotherapist and osteopath.

== Competitions ==
De Paepe started doing international para swimming competitions from around the age of 15.

He participated in the 2002, 2006 and 2010 IPC Swimming World Championships in multiple events, ranging from 50 to 400 metres freestyle S9 over 100 metres backstroke S9 to 200 metres individual medley SM9 and even 5,000 metres Open Water S10, with an 8th place in the 100 metres Freestyle S9 at the 2002 IPC Swimming World Championships in Mar del Plata, Argentina, as his best result.

He represented Belgium at the 2004 Summer Olympics in Athens, Greece finishing 6th in the final of the men's 400 metres freestyle S9.

After a long hiatus from competition sports, and when COVID-19 forced him to slow down at work, he turned to sports and after he cycled up the Mount Ventoux in France, he decided to join the "Royal Cercle Athlétique du Brabant Wallon" setting his mind to para triathlon. With success. At his very first European Triathlon Para Championships, in 2021 in Valencia, Spain, he wins the bronze medal. He follows that up in December of that year with another bronze medal, this time at the World Triathlon Para Championships in Abu Dhabi.

Nearly a year later to the day, he wins another bronze medal at the 2022 World Triathlon Para Championships again in Abu Dhabi.

Twenty years after participating as a swimmer in the 2004 Summer Paralympics in Athens, Greece, he qualified as a triathlete for the 2024 Summer Paralympics in Paris, France. In Paris, he finished 5th, one place better than in 2024. Barely 20 days after the Olympics, he won a bronze medal at the Europe Triathlon Championships in Vichy, France and in October he become world champion at the 2024 World Triathlon Para Championships in Torremolinos, Spain and the first Belgian to do so.
