= Tamás Tóth (swimmer) =

Hungarian Paralympic swimmer

Personal information
- Nickname: Toto
- Born: 5 January 1992 (age 34) Budapest, Hungary
- Height: 1.90 m (6 ft 3 in)

Sport
- Country: Hungary
- Sport: Paralympic swimming
- Disability: Amniotic band syndrome
- Disability class: S9
Medal record
Paralympic swimming
Representing Hungary
Paralympic Games
Gold medal – first place	2016 Rio de Janeiro	100m backstroke S9
Silver medal – second place	2012 London	50m freestyle S9
Silver medal – second place	2012 London	100m freestyle S9
Bronze medal – third place	2016 Rio de Janeiro	100m freestyle S9
World Championships
Bronze medal – third place	2010 Eindhoven	50m freestyle S9
Bronze medal – third place	2015 Glasgow	100m backstroke S9
Bronze medal – third place	2015 Glasgow	200m individual medley SM9
European Championships
Gold medal – first place	2011 Berlin	50m freestyle S9
Silver medal – second place	2014 Eindhoven	100m backstroke S9
Silver medal – second place	2014 Eindhoven	200m individual medley SM9
Silver medal – second place	2016 Funchal	200m individual medley SM9
Bronze medal – third place	2009 Reykjavik	100m breaststroke SB9
Bronze medal – third place	2011 Berlin	100m freestyle S9
Bronze medal – third place	2011 Berlin	100m backstroke S9
Bronze medal – third place	2011 Berlin	200m individual medley SM9
Bronze medal – third place	2016 Funchal	100m backstroke S9
Bronze medal – third place	2018 Dublin	100m backstroke S9
Bronze medal – third place	2018 Dublin	200m individual medley SM9

Tamás Tóth (born 5 January 1992) is a Hungarian Paralympic swimmer. He is a Paralympic champion, a three-time World Championships bronze medalist and one-time European champion. He was born with an underdeveloped right hand caused by amniotic band syndrome.

Tóth achieved the Knight's Cross of the Hungarian Order of Merit in 2012 and the Officer's Cross of the Hungarian Order of Merit in 2016 after his success at the 2012 Summer Paralympics and 2016 Summer Paralympics.
