= Laurence McGivern =

Irish Paralympic swimmer

Personal information
- Full name: Laurence McGivern
- Nationality: Ireland
- Born: 22 September 1992 (age 34) Rostrevor, County Down, Northern Ireland
- Height: 6 ft 1 in (1.85 m)
- Weight: 72 kg (159 lb)

Sport
- Sport: Swimming
- Strokes: Freestyle; Backstroke
- Club: Invictus
- College team: Queen's University Belfast
Medal record
IPC Swimming World Championships
Bronze medal – third place	2013 Montréal	100 m Backstroke S9

Laurence McGivern (born 22 September 1992) is a former Irish Paralympic swimmer from Rostrevor, County Down, Northern Ireland. He trained in Belfast, Northern Ireland with Invictus Swimming Club under coaching of Steven McQuillan, retiring in May 2015. He has congenital amputations of both legs just below the knee. McGivern was a finalist in the 2010 Commonwealth Games and the 2012 Paralympic Games as well as various IPC World and European Swimming Championships. He competes in the S9 classification in his main event, the 100m backstroke retiring after a third place and bronze medal at the IPC Swimming World Championships in Montreal 2013.

== Personal ==
Laurence was born on 22 September 1992 with various defects in both of his legs which resulted in their amputation, just below the knee. He is now able to walk with the aid of two prosthetic legs. Laurence took to many sports and hobbies, including; Gaelic Football, Athletics, Judo, Trampolining, Irish Dancing and ultimately Swimming. He attended the Abbey Christian Brothers' Grammar School in Newry, Northern Ireland, refining his sporting abilities and further realising his potential in swimming. He was also heavily involved in academic work and Is a talented musician and performer. McGivern soon joined Newry & Mourne ASC Swimming Club and competed at district, county and regional levels, including various open meets throughout the year. In 2012, after successfully completing A level examinations, he moved to Belfast where he was accepted to study Accounting with French at Queen's University Belfast and then went on to do a MSc in finance. As a student in university he trained with Invictus, one of Ireland's premier competitive swimming clubs and continued to balance academics with his sporting career. He was also elected as Treasurer of Queen's Musical theatre Society (QMTS), where he successfully received funding to produce a musical along with President, Hannah Le Fevre Taylor.

== Swimming ==
Laurence competed in the International Paralympic Committee's S9 (freestyle, backstroke and butterfly) SB8 (breaststroke) and SM9 (individual medley) classifications; which is said to consist of swimmers with a severe leg weakness, swimmers with slight coordination problems and swimmers with one limb loss. McGivern started swimming when he was still in primary school and after a few years his potential was recognised by Paralympics Ireland. He soon joined Newry & Mourne ASC Swimming Club to develop his talent and as his love for the sport grew, he dedicated more and more time to training, and set a goal to one day compete in the Paralympic Games. He competed at various local and national meets for the first few years of his training, setting and maintaining the current Irish S9 records in all strokes, before eventually qualifying for Senior IPC European and World Swimming championships and even the Commonwealth Games and Paralympic Games.

=== 2013 IPC Swimming World Championships ===
In 2013 Laurence took Bronze in the 100m backstroke at the 2013 IPC Swimming World Championships in Montréal, Canada. The event saw Ireland's largest ever haul at a Paralympic swimming meet. McGivern was the fourth fastest qualifier going into the final, having swum a time of 1.06.18 in the heat (close to his previous best of 1:05.35 which he swam at the Paralympic Games in London in 2012, in eighth place). He then went on to swim a personal best time of 1.04.75 in the final, finishing ahead of Paralympic Games bronze medallist Xiaobing Liu of China and Australia's Brenden Hall and claiming his first major international medal.

=== 2012 London Paralympic Games ===
After just qualifying at the last second for the S9 100m Backstroke, McGivern represented Ireland at the London 2012 Paralympic Games where he ended up making it through to the final. Just scraping the qualifying time of 1.07.83, Laurence smashed this time with a new personal best of 1.05.35 in the heat of the men's S9 100m Backstroke, placing himself sixth going into the final where he finished eighth overall and shocked a few of his more experienced competitors.

=== 2010 Commonwealth Games ===
McGivern competed in the 2010 Commonwealth Games in Delhi, being the only paralympic athlete representing Northern Ireland in the games. He came seventh in the Paralympic 50m S9 swimming event in a time of 28.95 - he set a personal best of 28.84 in the heats. He also finished fifth in the 100m S10 freestyle final in a time of 1:03.31, being the second fastest of the S9 swimmers.

=== 2009 IPC Swimming European Championships ===
Laurence's first main international sporting event was at the IPC Swimming European Championships in Reykjavík Iceland in 2009 when he was 18 years old. This was a great stepping stone on his Paralympic Journey where he had his first experience of elite competition.
