= Andrew Haley =

Canadian Paralympic swimmer

Personal information
- Born: 16 January 1974 (age 52) Moncton, New Brunswick, Canada
- Education: Dalhousie University; University of Ottawa

Sport
- Country: Canada
- Sport: Paralympic swimming
- Disability: Bone cancer
- Disability class: S9
- Retired: 2008
Medal record
Paralympic swimming
Representing Canada
Paralympic Games
Gold medal – first place	2000 Sydney	4x100m medley relay
Bronze medal – third place	1992 Barcelona	400m freestyle S9
Bronze medal – third place	1996 Atlanta	400m freestyle S9
Bronze medal – third place	1996 Atlanta	100m butterfly S9
Bronze medal – third place	2000 Sydney	100m butterfly S9
World Championships
Gold medal – first place	1998 Christchurch	100m butterfly S9
Gold medal – first place	1998 Christchurch	4x100m medley relay open
Gold medal – first place	2002 Mar del Plata	100m butterfly S9
Silver medal – second place	1998 Christchurch	200m individual medley SM9
Bronze medal – third place	1998 Christchurch	100m backstroke S9
Bronze medal – third place	2002 Mar del Plata	400m freestyle S9
Commonwealth Games
Gold medal – first place	1994 Victoria	100m freestyle S9
Parapan American Games
Bronze medal – third place	2007 Rio de Janeiro	400m freestyle S9
Bronze medal – third place	2007 Rio de Janeiro	100m butterfly S9
Bronze medal – third place	2007 Rio de Janeiro	200m individual medley SM9

Andrew Haley (born 16 January 1974) is a retired Canadian Paralympic swimmer who competed in international level events. He was a three-time World champion, five-time Paralympic medalist and a Commonwealth champion.

At six years old, Haley broke his leg while playing with his brother. He was also diagnosed with cancer in his right leg and it was amputated above the knee. The cancer returned two years later which spread into his lung, in both cases, Haley was given a 35% chance of survival.
