= Tamás Sors =

Hungarian Paralympic swimmer

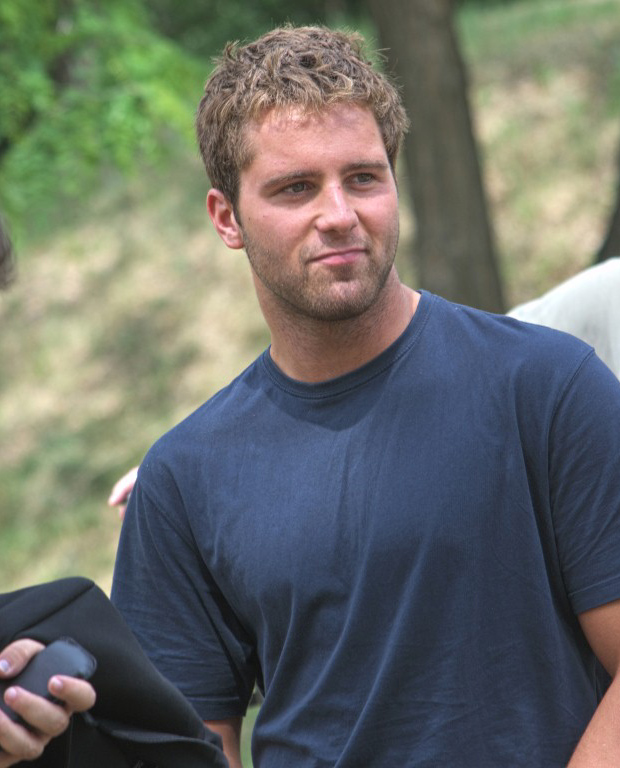
- Sors in 2012

Personal information
- Nationality: Hungarian
- Born: 27 May 1991 (age 35) Pécs, Hungary
- Height: 185 cm (73 in)

Sport
- Sport: Swimming
- Strokes: Freestyle
- Classifications: S9, SB8, SM9
- Club: ANK Swim Club
- Coach: Anatolij Petrov
Medal record
Paralympic swimming
Representing Hungary
Paralympic Games
Gold medal – first place	2008 Beijing	100 m butterfly S9
Gold medal – first place	2012 London	100 m butterfly S9
Silver medal – second place	2012 London	400 m freestyle S9
Silver medal – second place	2016 Rio de Janeiro	200 m medley SM9
Bronze medal – third place	2008 Beijing	100 m freestyle S9
Bronze medal – third place	2008 Beijing	400 m freestyle S9
Bronze medal – third place	2012 London	100 m freestyle S9
World Championships (LC)
Gold medal – first place	2010 Eindhoven	100 m butterfly S9
Silver medal – second place	2013 Montreal	100 m butterfly S9
IPC World Championships (SC)
Gold medal – first place	2009 Rio de Janeiro	100 m butterfly S9
Silver medal – second place	2009 Rio de Janeiro	50 m freestyle S9
Silver medal – second place	2009 Rio de Janeiro	100 m freestyle S9
Silver medal – second place	2009 Rio de Janeiro	100 m medley SM9
Bronze medal – third place	2009 Rio de Janeiro	200 m medley SM9
IPC European Championships
Gold medal – first place	2009 Reykjavik	100m butterfly S9
Gold medal – first place	2009 Reykjavik	50m freestyle S9
Gold medal – first place	2009 Reykjavik	100m freestyle S9
Gold medal – first place	2009 Reykjavik	100m backstroke S9
Silver medal – second place	2014 Eindhoven	200m medley SM9
Silver medal – second place	2014 Eindhoven	100m freestyle S9
Bronze medal – third place	2016 Funchal	200m medley SM9
Bronze medal – third place	2016 Funchal	100m butterfly S9

Tamás Sors (born 27 May 1991) is a Hungarian Paralympic swimmer. He has won two gold medals in the 100m butterfly event at the Paralympic Games, the first at the 2008 Summer Paralympics in Beijing and the second at the 2012 Summer Paralympics in London.
