= Michael Auprince =

Australian swimmer and wheelchair basketball player

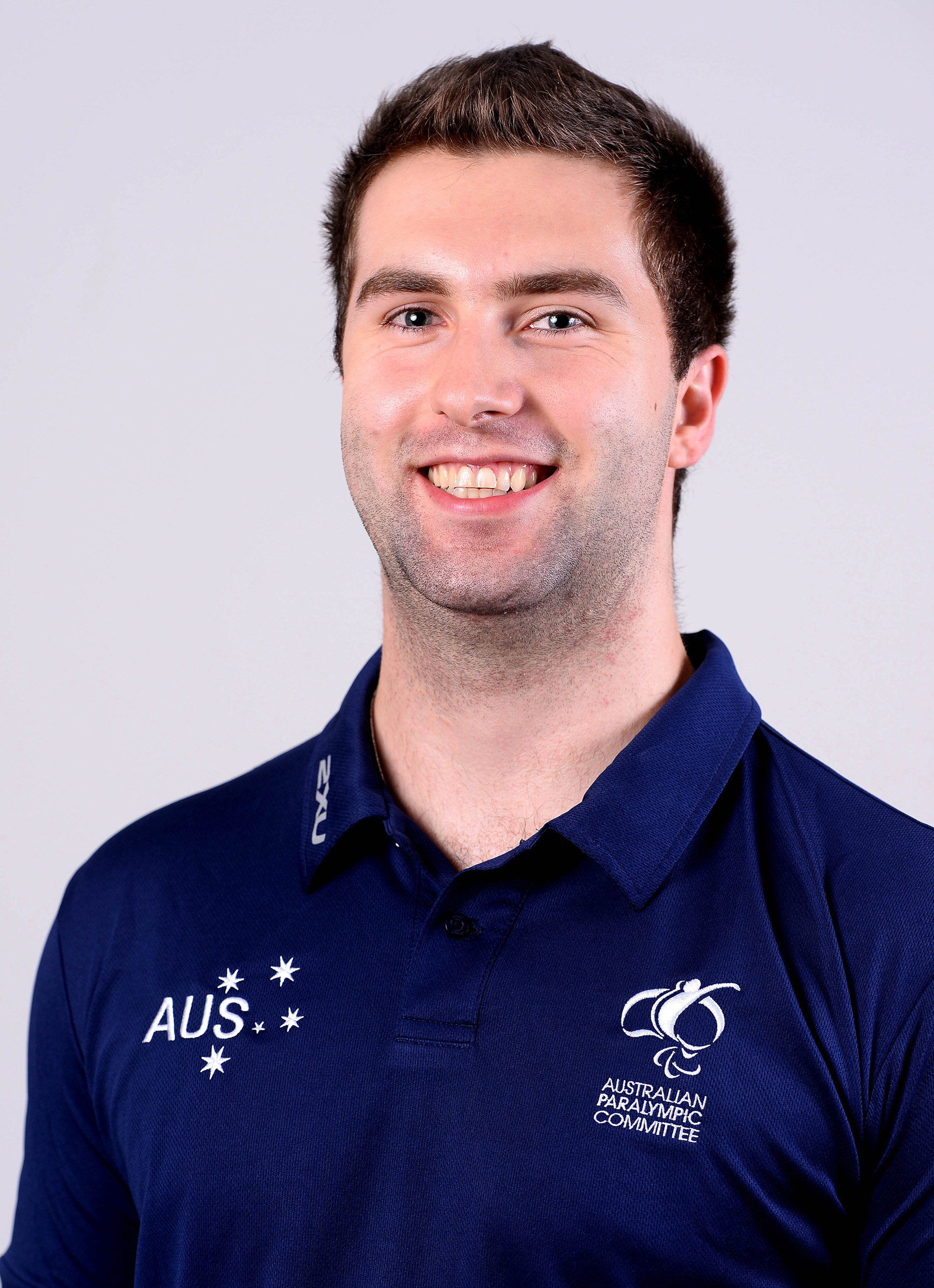
- 2016 Australian Paralympic team portrait of Auprince

Personal information
- Full name: Michael Auprince
- Nationality: Australia
- Born: 21 February 1993 (age 33)

Sport
- Disability class: 4.0 point player
Medal record
Men's paralympic swimming
Paralympic Games
Gold medal – first place	2012 London	4 × 100 m freestyle
Bronze medal – third place	2012 London	4 × 100 m medley
Men's wheelchair basketball
World Championship
Bronze medal – third place	2018 Hamburg	Team

Michael Auprince, OAM (born 21 February 1993) is a former Australian swimmer and wheelchair basketball player. He set several swimming records and was selected to represent Australia at the 2012 Summer Paralympics in London in swimming, where he won gold and bronze medals. He also represented the Rollers team at the 2020 Summer Paralympics. Michael is currently on the coaching staff of the University of Alabama Wheelchair Basketball team.

== Personal ==
Michael Christopher Auprince was born on 21 February 1993, and is from Peakhurst, New South Wales. When he was ten years old, his left leg was amputated by choice; the limb had no muscles as a consequence of a congenital birth defect. Prior to the surgery, he wore a prosthesis that gave his leg support. In 2007, Banks MP Daryl Melham presented Auprince and sixteen other athletes a Federal Government sports achievement award. He attended Peakhurst High School and Georges River College at their Oatley Senior Campus. In 2025, Auprince completed a masters of Sports management at the University of Alabama.

== Sport ==
Auprince is an S9 classified swimmer. As of 2011, he was a member of the Revesby Swimming Club, coached by Mick Gauci. He took up the sport in 2003 within six months of his leg being amputated.

He was selected to represent Australia at the 2012 Summer Olympics in swimming. In preparation for the Games, he participated in a sixteen-day Thailand-based team training camp. While there, he could not fully train as he had to deal with a case of food poisoning. He was scheduled to attend a training camp ahead of the Games in early August in Wales.

At the 2012 Summer Paralympics he won a gold in the 4 × 100 m freestyle relay and a bronze in the 4 × 100 m medley relay. He also participated in the S9 class of the Men's 100 m Backstroke, 100 m Butterfly, 100 m Freestyle and 50 m Freestyle events – as well as the Men's 200 m Individual Medley SM9. He was awarded an Order of Australia Medal in the 2014 Australia Day Honours "for service to sport as a Gold Medallist at the London 2012 Paralympic Games."

=== Wheelchair Basketball ===
He is classified 4 point player and plays centre.

At the conclusion of the 2012 Paralympic Games, Auprince decided to play wheelchair basketball and was selected for the 2013 Under-23 World Wheelchair Basketball Competition in Turkey, where the team won the bronze medal.

Auprince played in the United States for the Alabama Crimson Tide at the University of Alabama in Tuscaloosa 2015–2019. While playing with the Crimson Tide he won two College National Championships (2018 & 2019). He also played for the Wollongong Rollerhawks in the National Wheelchair Basketball League 2014–2018. in 2019 he switched things up to play with the Perth Wheelcats. In 2018, he was a member of the Rollers that won the bronze medal at 2018 Men's World Wheelchair Basketball Championship in Hamburg, Germany. Auprince played professionally for two seasons in Germany with RSV- Lahn Dill.

At the 2020 Tokyo Paralympics, the Rollers finished fifth with a win–loss record of 4–4.

=== Personal bests ===
Course	Event	Time	Meet	Swim Date	Reference
Long	50 m Backstroke	29.83	2012 EnergyAustralia Swimming Championships	20-Mar-12	
Long	100 m Backstroke	01:04.3	2012 EnergyAustralia Swimming Championships	15-Mar-12	
Long	200 m Backstroke	02:26.6	2010 NSW State 13–18 Years Age	4-Jan-10	
Long	50 m Breaststroke	37.28	2012 EnergyAustralia Swimming Championships	22-Mar-12	
Long	100 m Breaststroke	01:26.1	2011 MC Age Championships	9-Oct-11	
Long	50 m Butterfly	28.7	2012 EnergyAustralia Swimming Championships	17-Mar-12	
Long	100 m Butterfly	01:05.1	2012 EnergyAustralia Swimming Championships	21-Mar-12	
Long	50 m Freestyle	26.9	2012 EnergyAustralia Swimming Championships	16-Mar-12	
Long	100 m Freestyle	58.81	2012 EnergyAustralia Swimming Championships	19-Mar-12	
Long	400 m Freestyle	05:39.3	2007 NSW State Open Championships	16-Feb-07	
Long	200 m Medley	02:28.1	2011 MC Age Championships	7-Oct-11	
Short	50 m Backstroke	29.75	2011 Australian Short Course Championships	3-Jul-11	
Short	100 m Backstroke	01:02.9	2012 NSW Metropolitan SC Championships	14-Jul-12	
Short	200 m Backstroke	02:20.4	2009 NSW Metropolitan SC Champ	27-Jun-09	
Short	50 m Breaststroke	37.17	2011 Australian Short Course Championships	2-Jul-11	
Short	100 m Breaststroke	01:22.6	2011 Australian Short Course Championships	3-Jul-11	
Short	50 m Butterfly	30.08	2011 Australian Short Course Championships	3-Jul-11	
Short	50 m Freestyle	26.82	2012 NSW Metropolitan SC Championships	14-Jul-12	
Short	100 m Freestyle	59.91	2010 Telstra Australian Short Course	14-Jul-10	
Short	200 m Medley	02:26.7	2011 Australian Short Course Championships	1-Jul-11	
