= Sam Bramham =

Australian Paralympic swimmer (born 1988)

Sam Bramham O.A.M
Personal information
- Full name: Sam Julian Bramham
- Nationality: Australian
- Born: 23 May 1988 (age 38) Melbourne
- Education: La Trobe University
- Height: 1.79 m (5 ft 10 in)
- Weight: 92 kg (203 lb)

Sport
- Club: Carey Tritons
Medal record
Swimming
Paralympic Games
Gold medal – first place	2004 Athens	No Medley 34 pts
Gold medal – first place	2008 Beijing	Men's 4×100 m Medley 34 pts
Silver medal – second place	2004 Athens	Men's 4×100 m Freestyle 34 pts
Silver medal – second place	2008 Beijing	Men's 4×100 m Freestyle 34 pts
Bronze medal – third place	2004 Athens	Men's 100 m Butterfly S9

Sam Julian Bramham, OAM (born 23 May 1988) is an Australian Paralympic swimmer. He competed at the 2004 and 2008 Summer Paralympics. Between those two Games, he won two gold medals, two silver medals and a bronze medal. In 2014 Bramham entered the eleventh season of Big Brother Australia and in 2017 he was a contestant in the first season of Australian Ninja Warrior.

== Personal life ==
Bramham was born on 23 May 1988 and is from Ivanhoe, Victoria. He was born with no femur, and his leg was amputated when he was five years old to enable use of a prosthetic. He attended Ivanhoe Grammar School (Year 12 2007), where he began swimming and played other sports including water polo. One of his heroes is Geoff Huegill.

In 2009, Bramham received the Medal of the Order of Australia "For service to sport as a gold medallist at the Beijing 2008 Paralympic Games".

In 2014 he published an autobiography titled "Three Quarter Man" through Affirm Press.

As of 2025, Sam is co owner of Chei Wen Wine Bar (est. 2018) in Ivanhoe and Fly Lie Bar in Kew, Melbourne and occasional motivational speaker.

== Swimming ==
His highest international ranking was number one. He was coached by Matt Byrne of the Tritons Swimming Club, and has been an Australian Institute of Sport paralympic swimming and Victorian Institute of Sport scholarship holder.

In 2000, Brahman competed at the Pacific School Games.

Bramham first represented Australia internationally in 2004, as one of the youngest Australian competitors at the 2004 Athens Games. He broke a world record during one of the heats for the 100 m butterfly event. He won a gold medal in the men's 100 m butterfly S9 event, a gold medal in the men's 4×100 m medley 34 pts event, a silver medal in the men's 4×100 m freestyle 34 pts event, and a bronze medal in the Men's 4×100 m medley 34 event.

In 2006, he competed in the World Championships in Berlin, Germany where he set a world record and won a gold medal. Since the 2006 Commonwealth Games held in Melbourne, Victoria did not include Elite Athletes with a Disability butterfly swimming on the event schedule, he switched to and qualified to compete in the 100 m freestyle.

In the 2008 Beijing Games he won a gold medal in the men's 100 m butterfly S9 event, a gold medal in the men's 4×100 m medley 34 pts event and a silver medal in the men's 4×100 m freestyle 34 pts event.

In 2011, he competed in the Can-Am Swimming Open, where he earned gold medals in two events: S9 100 m freestyle and 50 m and 100 m butterfly.
