= Mauro Brasil =

Uruguayan football player (born 1999)

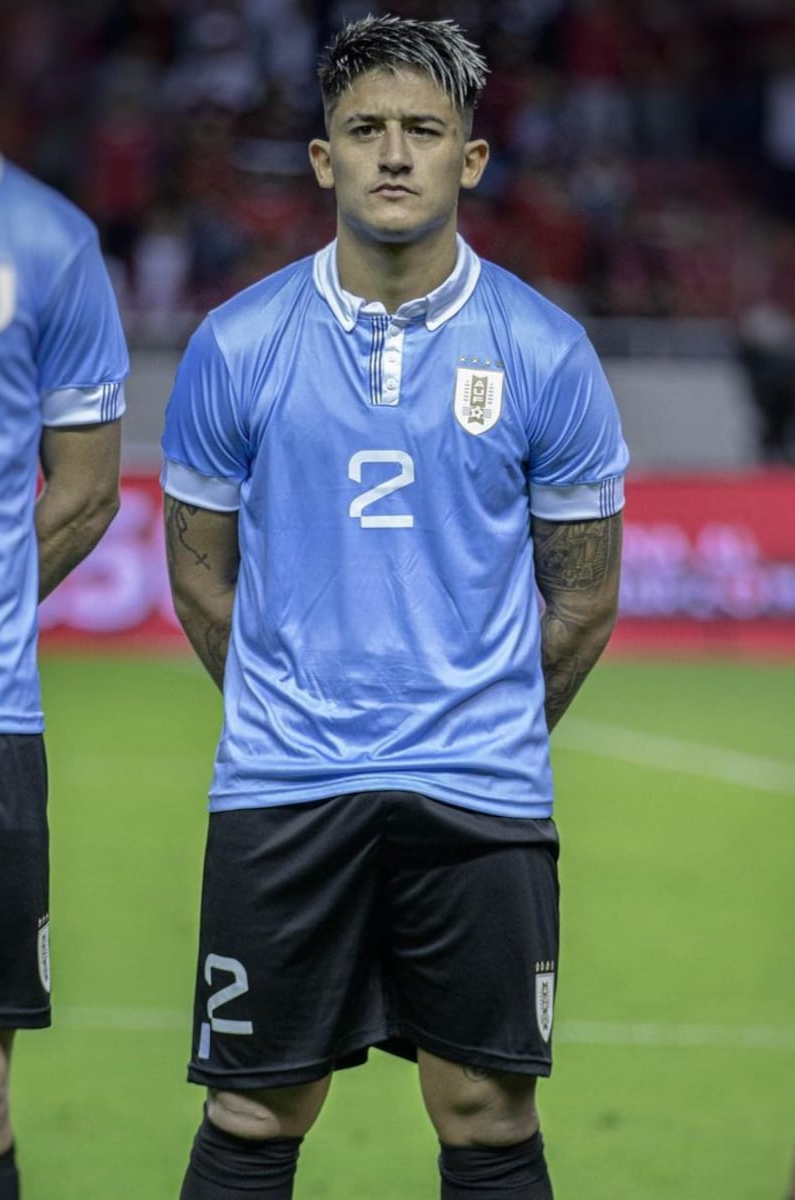
- Brasil with the Uruguay local national team in 2024

Personal information
- Full name: Mauro Alejandro Brasil Alcaire
- Date of birth: 27 April 1999 (age 27)
- Place of birth: Montevideo, Uruguay
- Height: 1.80 m (5 ft 11 in)
- Position: Defender

Team information
- Current team: Danubio
- Number: 19

Youth career
- El Tanque Sisley

Senior career*
Years	Team	Apps	(Gls)
2017–2018	El Tanque Sisley	14	(1)
2018–2020	Peñarol	0	(0)
2018	→ Rampla Juniors (loan)	13	(0)
2019	→ Cerro (loan)	17	(1)
2020	→ Cerro Largo (loan)	18	(0)
2021	Cerro Largo	11	(0)
2022	Celaya	31	(3)
2023–2024	Cerro Largo	47	(8)
2024	Cobreloa	9	(0)
2025	Cerro Largo	10	(0)
2026	Dinamo Samarqand	2	(0)
2026–	Danubio	5	(0)

International career^{‡}
2018	Uruguay U20	10	(0)
2024	Uruguay local	1	(0)
- * Club domestic league appearances and goals as of 1 October 2025 ‡ National team caps and goals as of 31 May 2024

Mauro Alejandro Brasil Alcaire (born 27 April 1999) is a Uruguayan professional footballer who plays as a defender for Liga AUF Uruguaya club Danubio.

== Club career ==
Brasil is a youth academy graduate of El Tanque Sisley. He made his professional debut on 18 September 2017 in a 1–0 defeat to Boston River. He scored his first goal on 8 October 2017 in a 1–1 draw against Montevideo Wanderers.

Peñarol signed Brasil ahead of the 2018 season and subsequently loaned him out to Rampla Juniors, Cerro and Cerro Largo. He made his continental debut during his loan spell at Rampla, in a 4–0 Copa Sudamericana win against Peruvian side UT Cajamarca.

In the second half of 2024, Brasil moved to Chile and signed with Cobreloa in the top division.

== International career ==
In May 2024, Brasil was named in the first ever Uruguay local national team squad. He made his Uruguay local team debut on 31 May 2024 in a goalless draw against Costa Rica.
