= James Crisp =

British swimmer

Personal information
- Born: 11 October 1982 (age 43) Nottingham
- Height: 1.85 m (6 ft 1 in)
- Weight: 70 kg (154 lb)

Sport
- Country: United Kingdom
- Sport: Paralympic swimming
- Club: City of Sheffield
- Coached by: Russ Barber
Medal record
Paralympic Games
Gold medal – first place	2000 Sydney	100 m backstroke (S9)
Gold medal – first place	2000 Sydney	200 m individual medley (SM9)
Gold medal – first place	2000 Sydney	4x100 m freestyle relay (34pts)
Silver medal – second place	2000 Sydney	100 m butterfly (S9)
Silver medal – second place	2000 Sydney	4x100 m medley relay (34pts)
Silver medal – second place	2004 Athens	400 m freestyle (S9)
Silver medal – second place	2004 Athens	100 m backstroke (S9)
Silver medal – second place	2004 Athens	100 m breaststroke (SB8)
Silver medal – second place	2012 London	100 m backstroke (S9)
Bronze medal – third place	2000 Sydney	100 m freestyle (S9)
Bronze medal – third place	2000 Sydney	400 m freestyle (S9)
Bronze medal – third place	2004 Athens	200 m individual medley (SM9)
IPC Swimming World Championships
Gold medal – first place	1998 Christchurch	100 m backstroke (S9)
Gold medal – first place	1998 Christchurch	200 m individual medley (SM9)
Gold medal – first place	2002 Mar del Plata	400 m freestyle (S9)
Gold medal – first place	2002 Mar del Plata	100 m backstroke (S9)
Gold medal – first place	2002 Mar del Plata	100 m breaststroke (SB8)
Gold medal – first place	2002 Mar del Plata	200 m individual medley (SM9)
Gold medal – first place	2002 Mar del Plata	4x100 m medley relay (34pts)
Gold medal – first place	2006 Durban	400 m freestyle (S9)
Silver medal – second place	2006 Durban	4x100 m medley relay (34pts)
Silver medal – second place	2010 Eindhoven	100 m backstroke (S9)
Silver medal – second place	2015 Glasgow	100 m backstroke (S9)
Bronze medal – third place	1998 Christchurch	400 m freestyle (S9)
Bronze medal – third place	2002 Mar del Plata	100 m butterfly (S9)
Bronze medal – third place	2002 Mar del Plata	400 m freestyle (S9)
Bronze medal – third place	2006 Durban	200 m individual medley (SM9)
Bronze medal – third place	2006 Durban	100 m backstroke (S9)
Bronze medal – third place	2010 Eindhoven	400 m freestyle (S9)
IPC Swimming European Championships
Gold medal – first place	2016 Funchal	100 m backstroke – S9

James Crisp (born 11 October 1982 in Nottingham) is a British swimmer. He has won gold medals in the Paralympic Games as well as the IPC world and European championships, breaking numerous records in the process. He competes in S9 classification events after having contracted polio as a child.

== Personal life ==
Crisp was born on 11 October 1982 in Nottingham. He contracted polio as a child through vaccination and was encouraged to take up swimming as a form of physiotherapy. He moved to Sheffield to study at university and became a member of the City of Sheffield Swim Squad (COSSS), training at Ponds Forge.

== Swimming career ==
Crisp competes in S9 swimming events and has won medals in all the different competitive swimming strokes. He holds a number of British and European records across a range of different strokes and lengths. He has won world championship titles in the freestyle, breaststroke, backstroke, and the individual medley as well as being part of the 2002 championship-winning 4x100 m relay team.

=== Paralympic Games ===
To date Crisp has won twelve Paralympic medals. Seven of the medals were awarded at the 2000 Summer Paralympics including individual golds in the 100 m backstroke and the 200 m individual medley. He was also part of the victorious 4x100 m freestyle relay team alongside Jody Cundy, Giles Long, David Roberts, Matt Walker and Marc Woods. At the 2004 Games Crisp won four individual medals, including three silvers, with all four events being in different stroke styles.

In what he has described as the most difficult time of his 14-year career Crisp missed out on the 2008 Games due to a shoulder injury.

=== IPC World and European championships ===
Crisp has achieved significant success in the IPC Swimming World Championships, winning sixteen medals. He claimed two golds in 1998, five in 2002, and one in 2006. He has also seen many victories in the European Championships, winning three golds in 1999, four in 2001, and one in 2011. He has been on the podium thirteen times at the European events.
