= Jesús Collado =

Spanish Paralympic swimmer

Personal information
- Full name: Jesús Collado Alarcón
- Nationality: Spanish
- Born: 13 September 1979 (age 46) Barcelona, Spain

Sport
- Sport: Swimming
- Classifications: S9
Medal record
Men's swimming
Representing Spain
Paralympic Games
Gold medal – first place	2000 Sydney	100 m butterfly - S9
Bronze medal – third place	2000 Sydney	100 m backstroke - S9
Bronze medal – third place	2000 Sydney	200 m medley - S9
Gold medal – first place	2004 Athens	100 m butterfly - S9
Bronze medal – third place	2004 Athens	100 m backstroke - S9
Gold medal – first place	2008 Beijing	400 m freestyle - S9
World Championships
Silver medal – second place	2002 Mar del Plata	100 m freestyle - S9
Silver medal – second place	2002 Mar del Plata	100 m butterfly - S9
Silver medal – second place	2002 Mar del Plata	4 x 100 m medley relay - 34pts
Silver medal – second place	2006 Durban	100 m butterfly - S9
Silver medal – second place	2010 Eindhoven	400 m freestyle - S9

Jesús Collado Alarcón (born 13 September 1979 in Barcelona) is an S9 swimmer from Spain.

== Personal ==
Collado was born 13 September 1979 in Barcelona. He is from the Catalan region of Spain.

== Swimming ==
Collado is an S9 swimmer. In 2007, he competed at the IDM German Open. In 2010, Collado raced at the Tenerife International Open. From the Catalan region of Spain, he was a recipient of a 2012 Plan ADO scholarship.

=== Paralympics ===
Collado competed at the 2000 Summer Paralympics, winning a gold medal in the 100 meter butterfly race, and a bronze in the 100 meter backstroke race and in the 200 meter individual medley SM9 race. He competed at the 2004 Summer Paralympics, winning a gold medal in the 100 meter butterfly race, and a bronze in the 100 meter backstroke race. He competed at the 2008 Summer Paralympics, winning a gold in the 400 meter freestyle race. He raced at the 2012 Summer Paralympics, where he did not medal.
