= Mark Barr (triathlete) =

American Paralympic triathlete

Personal information
- Nationality: American
- Born: August 24, 1986 (age 39) Woodland, California, United States
Medal record
Men's paratriathlon
Representing United States
Paralympic Games
Bronze medal – third place	2024 Paris	PTS2
World Championships
Gold medal – first place	2018 Gold Coast	PTS2
Silver medal – second place	2016 Rotterdam	PT2
Silver medal – second place	2017 Rotterdam	PTS2
Bronze medal – third place	2013 London	TRI 2
Americas Championships
Gold medal – first place	2014 Dallas	PT2
Gold medal – first place	2015 Monterrey	PT2
Gold medal – first place	2016 Sarasota	PT2
Gold medal – first place	2017 Sarasota	PTS2
Gold medal – first place	2018 Sarasota-Bradenton	PTS2
Gold medal – first place	2019 Sarasota-Bradenton	PTS2
Gold medal – first place	2023 Sarasota	PTS2
Gold medal – first place	2024 Miami	PTS2

Mark Barr (born August 24, 1986) is an American para-triathlete. He won a bronze medal at the 2024 Summer Paralympics in the Men's PTS2. He also competed in the 2004 and 2008 Summer Paralympics as a swimmer and in the 2016 Summer Paralympics in triathlon.

Barr had his right leg amputated at the age of 14 due to osteosarcoma.

In college, Barr swam for Cal Poly in San Luis Obispo. He competed for the Mustangs at the Big West Championships, and in February 2008 at the conference meet, set then-American Paralympic records for the 100 butterfly (57.68 seconds) and 200 fly (2:06.17).
