= Andriy Sirovatchenko =

Ukrainian Paralympic swimmer

Medal record

Swimming

Representing Ukraine

Paralympic Games
Bronze medal – third place	2008 Beijing	4x100 metre medley - 34 pts

IPC European Championships
Gold medal – first place	2009 Reykjavik	4x100m medley relay 34pts
Bronze medal – third place	2009 Reykjavik	4x100m freestyle relay 34pts

Andriy Sirovatchenko is a Paralympic swimmer from Ukraine competing mainly in category S9 events.

Andriy has twice competed at the Paralympics in 2004 and 2008. In 2004 he competed in the 100m backstroke and 100m freestyle finishing last in both heats, the 50m freestyle finishing eighth in the final. He was also part of the Ukrainian quartets that finished sixth in the 4 × 100 m medley and fifth in the heat of the 4 × 100 m freestyle. In the 2008 games he was again part of the 4 × 100 m medley but this time they picked up a bronze medal, he also competed in the 50m freestyle, 100m freestyle, 100m butterfly failing to make the final of any of them and finished sixth in the final of the 100m backstroke.
