= S9 (classification) =

Para-swimming classification

S9, SB8, SM9 are Para swimming classifications used for categorizing swimmers based on their level of disability. Swimmers in this class generally have severe weakness in one leg. This class includes a number of different disabilities including people with amputations and cerebral palsy. The classification is governed by the International Paralympic Committee, and competes at the Paralympic Games.

== Definition ==
This classification is for swimming. In the classification title, S represents Freestyle, Backstroke and Butterfly strokes. SB means breaststroke. SM means individual medley. Jane Buckley, writing for the Sporting Wheelies, describes the swimmers in this classification as having: "severe weakness in one leg only; Swimmers with very slight coordination problems; Swimmers with one limb loss. Unless there is an underlying medical condition usually all of these athletes will start out of the water." Swimming classifications are on a gradient, with one being the most severely physically impaired to ten having the least amount of physical disability.

== Disability types ==
This class includes people with several disability types include cerebral palsy and amputations.

=== Amputee ===
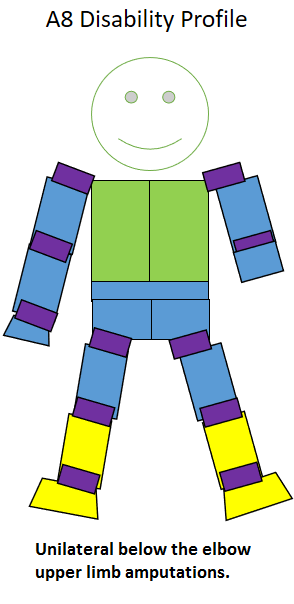
Type of amputation for an A8 classified sportsperson.

ISOD amputee A8 swimmers may be found in this class. S9 amputee swimmers in this class have similar start times to people with legs amputations in S8 to S10 classes. Paralympic S9 swimmers in this class can get water entry distance off the block comparable to Olympic athletes. Compared to able bodied swimmers, swimmers in this class have a shorter stroke length and increased stroke rate. Because their legs are their greatest strength, they modify their entry into the water to take advantage of this.

The nature of a person's amputations in this class can effect their physiology and sports performance. Because they are missing a limb, amputees are more prone to overuse injuries in their remaining limbs. Common problems for intact upper limbs for people in this class include rotator cuffs tearing, shoulder impingement, epicondylitis and peripheral nerve entrapment.

=== Cerebral palsy ===
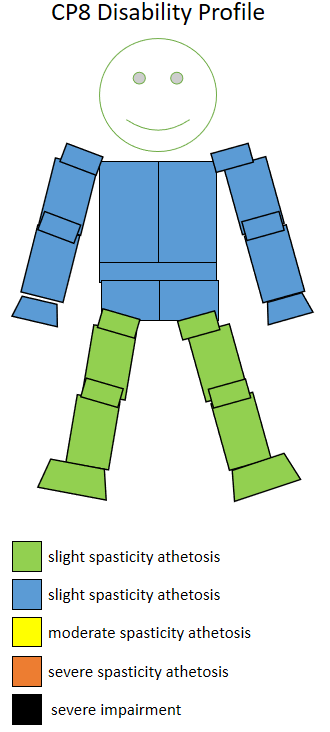
The spasticity athetosis level and location of a CP8 sportsperson.

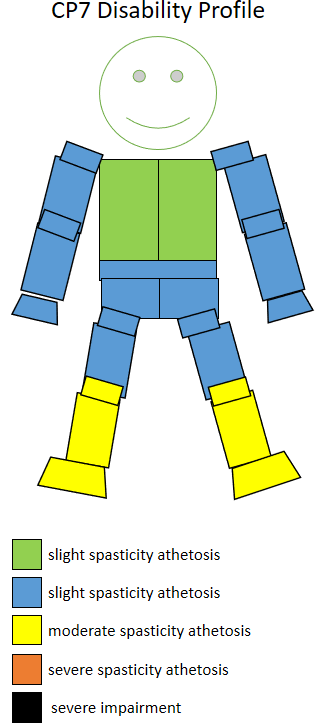
The spasticity athetosis level and location of a CP7 sportsperson.

CP7 and CP8 class swimmers are sometimes found in this class. CP7 sportspeople are able to walk, but appear to do so while having a limp as one side of their body is more affected than the other. They may have involuntary muscles spasms on one side of their body. They have fine motor control on their dominant side of the body, which can present as asymmetry when they are in motion. People in this class tend to have energy expenditure similar to people without cerebral palsy.

Because of the neuromuscular nature of their disability, CP7 and CP8 swimmers have slower start times than other people in their classes. They are also more likely to interlock their hands when underwater in some strokes to prevent hand drift, which increases drag while swimming. CP8 swimmers experience swimmers shoulder, a swimming related injury, at rates similar to their able-bodied counterparts. When fatigued, asymmetry in their stroke becomes a problem for swimmers in this class. The integrated classification system used for swimming, where swimmers with CP compete against those with other disabilities, is subject to criticisms has been that the nature of CP is that greater exertion leads to decreased dexterity and fine motor movements. This puts competitors with CP at a disadvantage when competing against people with amputations who do not lose coordination as a result of exertion.

CP7 swimmers tend to have a passive normalized drag in the range of 0.6 to 0.8. This puts them into the passive drag band of PDB6, PDB8, and PDB9. CP8 swimmers tend to have a passive normalized drag in the range of 0.4 to 0.9. This puts them into the passive drag band of PDB6, PDB8, and PDB10.

=== Spinal cord injuries ===
People with spinal cord injuries compete in this class, including F8 sportspeople.

==== F8 ====
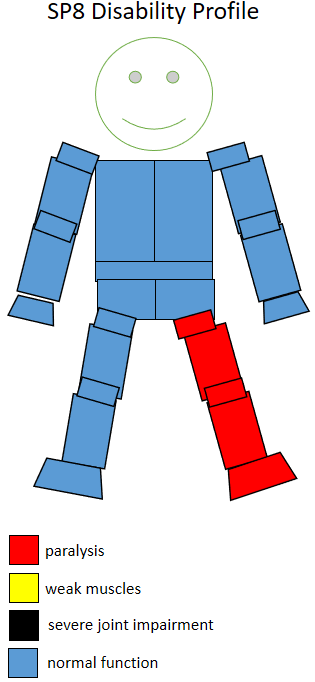
Functional profile of a wheelchair sportsperson in the F8 class.

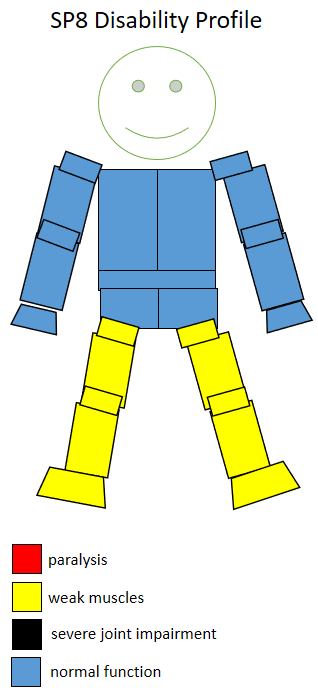
A profile of disability type of an F8 sportsperson.

F8 is standing wheelchair sport class. The level of spinal cord injury for this class involves people who have incomplete lesions at a slightly higher level. This means they can sometimes bear weight on their legs. In 2002, USA Track & Field defined this class as, "These are standing athletes with dynamic standing balance. Able to recover in standing when balance is challenged. Not more than 70 points in legs." In 2003, Disabled Sports USA defined this class as, "In a sitting class but not more than 70 points in the lower limbs. Are unable to recover balance in challenged standing position." In Australia, this class means combined lower plus upper limb functional problems. "Minimal disability." It can also mean in Australia that the athlete is "ambulant with moderately reduced function in one or both lower limbs." They have a normalized drag in the range of 0.6 to 0.7.

== History ==
The classification was created by the International Paralympic Committee. In 2003 the committee approved a plan which recommended the development of a universal classification code. The code was approved in 2007, and defines the "objective of classification as developing and implementing accurate, reliable and consistent sport focused classification systems", which are known as "evidence based, sport specific classification". In November 2015, they approved the revised classification code, which "aims to further develop evidence based, sport specific classification in all sports".

In 1997, Against the odds : New Zealand Paralympians said this classification was graded along a gradient, with S1 being the most disabled and S10 being the least disabled. At this time, competitors who were S9 classified tended to be above the elbow or above the knee amputees.

== Competitions ==
For this classification, organisers of the Paralympic Games have the option of including the following events on the Paralympic programme: 50m and 100m Freestyle, 400m Freestyle, 100m Backstroke, 100m Butterfly, 100m Breaststroke and 200m Individual Medley events

== Records ==
In the S9 50 m Freestyle Long Course, the men's world record is held by Australia's Matthew Cowdrey and the women's world record is held by South Africa's Natalie Du Toit. In the S9 100 m Freestyle Long Course, the men's world record is held by Australia's Rowan Crothers and the women's world record is held by South Africa's Natalie Du Toit.

== Paralympic records ==
The table below records the fastest ever Paralympic record in this class for specific events.

Event	Class	Time		Name	Nation	Date	Games	Location	Ref
50 m freestyle	S9	25.34	WR	Matthew John Cowdrey	Australia	Sep 14, 2008	2008 Beijing	China	
100 m freestyle	S9	54.58	WR	Rowan Crothers	Australia	July 24, 2014	2014 Glasgow	Scotland	
400 m freestyle	S9	4:17.02	WR	Jesus Collado	Spain	Sep 12, 2008	2008 Beijing	China	
100 m backstroke	S9	1:03.34	WR	Matthew John Cowdrey	Australia	Sep 13, 2008	2008 Beijing	China	
100 m butterfly	S9	57.19	WR	William Martin	Australia	Sep 2, 2021	2020 Tokyo	Japan	

Legend: # – Record awaiting ratification by IPC; WR – World record; e – equalled existing record;
Records not set in finals: h – heat; r – relay 1st leg; rh – relay heat 1st leg; so – swim-off

== Getting classified ==
Classification generally has four phases. The first stage of classification is a health examination. For amputees in this class, this is often done on site at a sports training facility or competition. The second stage is observation in practice, the third stage is observation in competition and the last stage is assigning the sportsperson to a relevant class. Sometimes the health examination may not be done on site for amputees in this class because the nature of the amputation could cause not physically visible alterations to the body.

In Australia, to be classified in this category, athletes contact the Australian Paralympic Committee or their state swimming governing body. In the United States, classification is handled by the United States Paralympic Committee on a national level. The classification test has three components: "a bench test, a water test, observation during competition." American swimmers are assessed by four people: a medical classified, two general classified and a technical classifier.

== Competitors ==
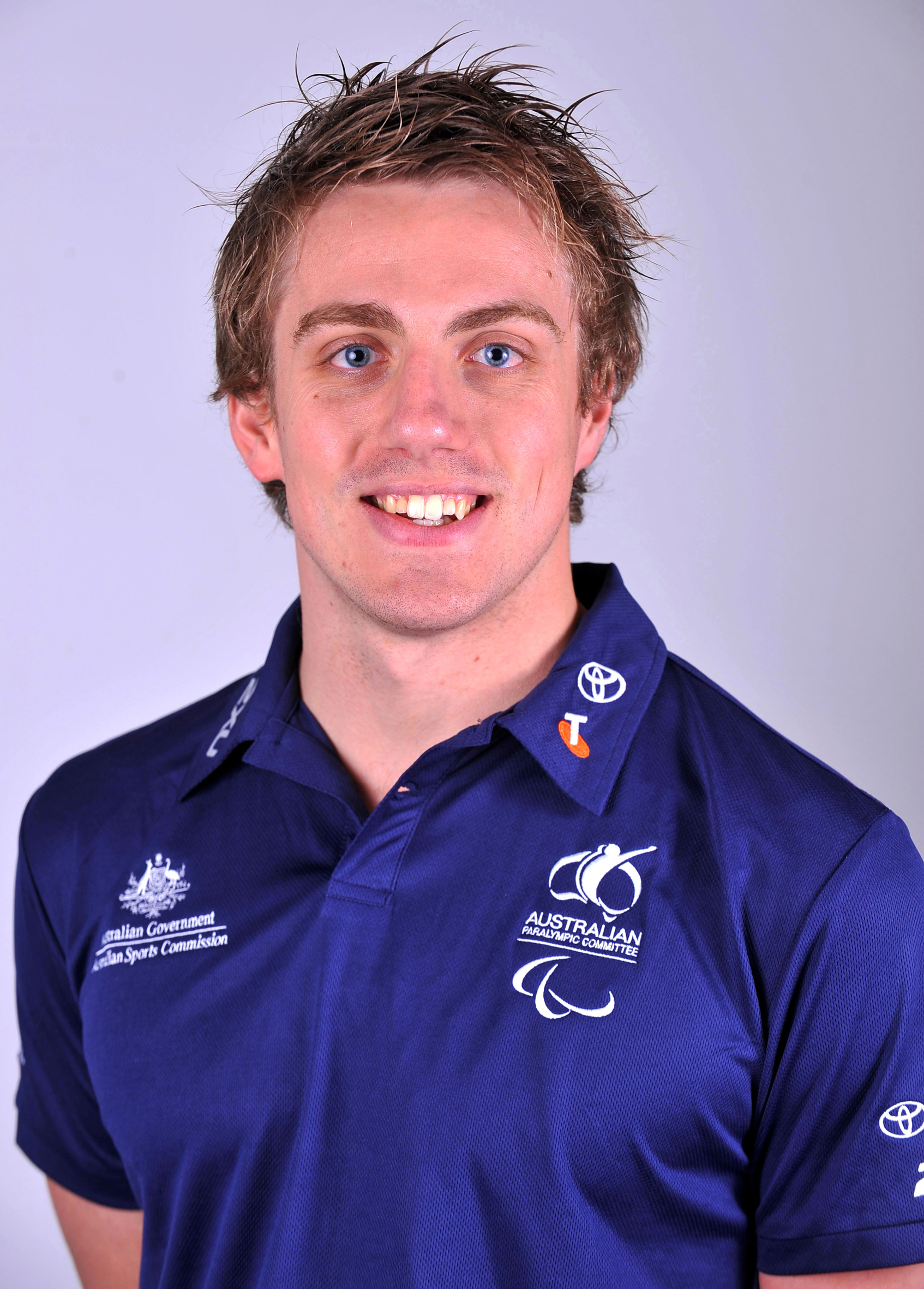
S9 classified swimmer Matthew Cowdrey

Swimmers who have competed in this classification include Ellie Cole, Jesus Collado and Matthew Cowdrey who all won medals in their class at the 2008 Paralympics.

American swimmers who have been classified by the United States Paralympic Committee as being in this class include Dana Albrycht, Luis Alicea, Hannah Aspden, Cody Bureau, Michael Prout Jr., David Gelfand, Joseph Peppersack, and Staci Perrige.
