= Michael Prout =

American Paralympic swimmer (born 1986)

Personal information
- Nationality: United States
- Born: February 18, 1986 (age 40) Springfield, Massachusetts
- Height: 5 ft 4 in (1.63 m)

Sport
- Sport: Swimming
- Strokes: Backstroke, butterfly, freestyle, individual medley
- Classifications: S9
Medal record
Men's swimming
IPC Swimming World Championships
Gold medal – first place	2002 Mar del Plata	100m freestyle
Gold medal – first place	2002 Mar del Plata	200m freestyle
Gold medal – first place	2002 Mar del Plata	200m butterfly
Gold medal – first place	2002 Mar del Plata	200m backstroke
Gold medal – first place	2002 Mar del Plata	400m freestyle
Gold medal – first place	2002 Mar del Plata	800m freestyle
Gold medal – first place	2002 Mar del Plata	1500m freestyle
Paralympic Games
Gold medal – first place	2004 Athens	400m freestyle
Bronze medal – third place	2004 Athens	100m freestyle
Parapan American Games
Gold medal – first place	2007 Rio de Janeiro	100m backstroke
Gold medal – first place	2007 Rio de Janeiro	100m freestyle
Gold medal – first place	2007 Rio de Janeiro	200m individual medley
Gold medal – first place	2007 Rio de Janeiro	400m freestyle
Silver medal – second place	2007 Rio de Janeiro	50 metres (160 ft) freestyle
Silver medal – second place	2007 Rio de Janeiro	100m freestyle
Silver medal – second place	2007 Rio de Janeiro	400m freestyle
Bronze medal – third place	2007 Rio de Janeiro	400m freestyle
Pan Pacific Para-Swimming Championships
Gold medal – first place	2011 Edmonton	100m freestyle
Silver medal – second place	2011 Edmonton	400m freestyle
Bronze medal – third place	2011 Edmonton	200m individual medley

Michael Prout is an American Paralympic swimmer.

== Early life and education ==
Prout is a son of Michael and Patricia Prout and has a sister named Taryn.

Prout graduated with honours from St Marys Senior High School and in 2009 he graduated from University of Massachusetts Amherst.

== Athletic career ==
In 2002 Prout won first place in all swimming competitions at the National Disability Championships, held at Federal Way, Washington. The next year he won first place for the 100, 200, and 400 metre freestyle swims at the Canadian Open Swim, in Edmonton, Alberta, Canada. In 2004 Prout participated in the Paralympic Games in Athens, Greece where he won two medals, one of which was gold. In 2005 he won a gold medal for 400m freestyle, which was held at U.S. Paralympics Open Swimming Championships in Minneapolis, Minnesota.

In 2006 he got fourth place three times in a row at the 2006 IPC Swimming World Championships, but next year, won eight medals at Parapan American Games. In 2007 Prout won four gold for 100 m backstroke, the same for freestyle, 200 m individual medley and 400 metre freestyle. The same year he also won three silver medals for 50 metre freestyle, 100 m butterfly, and 400 metre freestyle relay. The same year he won a bronze medal for 400 m medley relay at Parapan American Games, at Rio de Janeiro, Brazil. In 2008 he led an American record for 200 metre freestyle at Can-Am Championships which was held at Victoria, British Columbia. Three years later he won another gold medal for 100 metre backstroke, a silver for 400 metre, and bronze for 200 metre individual medley.

He worked for Colorado Springs Olympic Training Center where in 2012 he met with former US President Barack Obama. He now coaches the Simmons University Swim and Dive team.
