= Swimming at the 2012 Summer Paralympics – Men's 100 metre butterfly S8 =

Event at the 2012 Summer Paralympics

Men's 100 metre butterfly S8 at the XIV Paralympic Games
- Venue: London Aquatics Centre
- Dates: 30 August 2012
- Competitors: 19 from 11 nations

Medalists
1st place, gold medalist(s)		Charles Rozoy	France
2nd place, silver medalist(s)		Yanpeng Wei	China
3rd place, bronze medalist(s)		Maodang Song	China

The men's 100 metre butterfly S8 event at the 2012 Paralympic Games took place on 30 August, at the London Aquatics Centre.

Three heats were held, two with six swimmers each and one with seven swimmers. The swimmers with the eight fastest times advanced to the final.

== Heats ==
=== Heat 1 ===
Rank	Lane	Name	Nationality	Time	Notes
1	4	Jiachao Wang	China	1:03.94	Q
2	3	Evgeny Zimin	Russia	1:05.82	Q
3	5	Sean Fraser	Great Britain	1:05.94	Q
4	7	Sharath Gayakwad	India	1:07.12	
5	6	Niels Korfitz Mortensen	Denmark	1:08.75	
6	2	Rudy Garcia-Tolson	United States	1:09.94	

=== Heat 2 ===
Rank	Lane	Name	Nationality	Time	Notes
1	5	Maodang Song	China	1:02.77	Q
2	4	Yanpeng Wei	China	1:02.93	Q
3	2	Michele Ferrarin	Italy	1:07.26	
4	3	Ferenc Csuri	Hungary	1:07.41	
5	6	Evan Ryan Austin	United States	1:08.61	
6	7	Alejandro Sanchez Palomero	Spain	1:12.72	

=== Heat 3 ===
Rank	Lane	Name	Nationality	Time	Notes
1	4	Charles Rozoy	France	1:01.18 EU	Q
2	5	Denis Tarasov	Russia	1:05.22	Q
3	3	Jaime Bailon Galindo	Spain	1:06.54	
4	6	Oliver Hynd	Great Britain	1:07.62	
5	2	Luis Armando Andrade Guillen	Mexico	1:08.06	
6	7	Andreas Onea	Austria	1:09.43	
	1	Mikkel Asmussen	Denmark	Did not start	

== Final ==
Rank	Lane	Name	Nationality	Time	Notes
1st place, gold medalist(s)	4	Charles Rozoy	France	1:01.24	
2nd place, silver medalist(s)	3	Yanpeng Wei	China	1:01.66	
3rd place, bronze medalist(s)	5	Maodang Song	China	1:01.99	
4	6	Jiachao Wang	China	1:02.00	
5	2	Denis Tarasov	Russia	1:02.05	
6	1	Sean Fraser	Great Britain	1:05.99	
7	7	Evgeny Zimin	Russia	1:06.34	
8	8	Jaime Bailon Galindo	Spain	1:06.35	
