= Swimming at the 2012 Summer Paralympics – Men's 4 × 100 metre medley relay 34pts =

Event at the 2012 Summer Paralympics

Men's 4x100m Medley Relay 34 points at the XIV Paralympic Games
- Venue: London Aquatics Centre
- Dates: 8 September 2012
- Competitors: 10
- Winning time: 4:09.04

Medalists
| 1st place, gold medalist(s) | | China (CHN); Liu Xiaobing, Lin Furong, Wei Yanpeng, Wang Yinan |
| 2nd place, silver medalist(s) | | Russia (RUS); Konstantin Lisenkov, Pavel Poltavtsev, Eduard Samarin, Denis Tarasov |
| 3rd place, bronze medalist(s) | | Australia (AUS); Michael Anderson, Matthew Cowdrey, Brenden Hall, Matthew Levy |

The men's 4 × 100 m medley relay 34 points event at the 2012 Summer Paralympics took place at the London Aquatics Centre on 8 September. There were two heats; the teams with the eight fastest times advanced to the final.

== Results ==
=== Heats ===
Competed from 11:57.

==== Heat 1 ====
| Rank | Lane | Nation | Swimmers | Time | Notes |
|---|---|---|---|---|---|
| 1 | 3 | Great Britain | Jonathan Fox; Jack Bridge; James Hollis; Thomas Young | 4:22.79 | Q |
| 2 | 4 | Russia | Andrey Gladkov; Denis Dorogaev; Evgeny Zimin; Dmitry Grigoryev | 4:24.45 | Q |
| 3 | 6 | United States | Michael Prout; Joe Wise; Cody Bureau; Lantz Lamback | 4:30.53 | Q |
| 4 | 5 | Brazil | André Brasil; Carlos Alberto Lopes Maciel; Phelipe Andrews Melo Rodrigues; Adriano de Lima | 4:33.04 | Q |
| 5 | 2 | Denmark | Niels Korfitz Mortensen; Mikkel Asmussen; Lasse Winther Andersen; Kasper Zysek | 4:43.18 | |

==== Heat 2 ====
| Rank | Lane | Nation | Swimmers | Time | Notes |
|---|---|---|---|---|---|
| 1 | 4 | Australia | Michael Auprince; Rick Pendleton; Andrew Pasterfield; Matthew Haanappel | 4:24.70 | Q |
| 2 | 3 | China | Liu Xiaobing; Liu Ruijin; Wang Jiachao; Song Maodang | 4:25.46 | Q |
| 3 | 5 | Ukraine | Iaroslav Semenenko; Iurii Martynov; Andriy Sirovatchenko; Maksym Isaiev | 4:25.52 | Q |
| 4 | 6 | Spain | Ander Romarate Aguirre; Javier Crespo; Jaime Bailon Galindo; Jose Antonio Mari Alcaraz | 4:31.85 | Q |
| 5 | 2 | Germany | Lucas Ludwig; Torben Schmidtke; Martin Schulz; Christoph Burkard | 4:38.94 | |

=== Final ===
Competed at 20:45.

| Rank | Lane | Nation | Swimmers | Time | Notes |
|---|---|---|---|---|---|
| 1st place, gold medalist(s) | 6 | China | Liu Xiaobing; Lin Furong; Wei Yanpeng; Wang Yinan | 4:09.04 | WR |
| 2nd place, silver medalist(s) | 5 | Russia | Konstantin Lisenkov; Pavel Poltavtsev; Eduard Samarin; Denis Tarasov | 4:09.08 | EU |
| 3rd place, bronze medalist(s) | 3 | Australia | Michael Anderson; Matthew Cowdrey; Brenden Hall; Matthew Levy | 4:14.97 | |
| 4 | 2 | Ukraine | Maksym Isaiev; Andriy Kalyna; Andriy Sirovatchenko; Yevheniy Bohodayko | 4:15.48 | |
| 5 | 4 | Great Britain | James Crisp; Jack Bridge; Sean Fraser; Thomas Young | 4:20.54 | |
| 6 | 7 | United States | Justin Zook; Rudy Garcia-Tolson; Ian Jaryd Silverman; Lantz Lamback | 4:26.04 | |
| 7 | 8 | Brazil | Daniel Dias; Carlos Alberto Lopes Maciel; André Brasil; Phelipe Andrews Melo Rodrigues | 4:28.50 | |
| 8 | 1 | Spain | Ander Romarate Aguirre; Javier Crespo; Jaime Bailon Galindo; Jose Antonio Mari Alcaraz | 4:31.04 | |

Q = qualified for final. WR = World Record. EU = European Record.
