= Swimming at the 2012 Summer Paralympics – Men's 100 metre freestyle S8 =

Event at the 2012 Summer Paralympics

Men's 100m Freestyle S8 at the XIV Paralympic Games
- Venue: London Aquatics Centre
- Dates: 6 September 2012
- Competitors: 16 from 12 nations
- Winning time: 56.58

Medalists
1st place, gold medalist(s)		Wang Yinan	China
2nd place, silver medalist(s)		Denis Tarasov	Russia
3rd place, bronze medalist(s)		Konstantin Lisenkov	Russia

The men's 100m freestyle S8 event at the 2012 Summer Paralympics took place at the London Aquatics Centre on 6 September. There were two heats; the swimmers with the eight fastest times advanced to the final.

== Results ==
=== Heats ===
Competed from 11:03.

==== Heat 1 ====
Rank	Lane	Name	Nationality	Time	Notes
1	5	Wang Yinan	China	58.97	Q
2	4	Maurice Deelen	Netherlands	59.88	Q
3	3	Sean Fraser	Great Britain	1:00.78	Q
4	6	Blake Cochrane	Australia	1:01.72	Q
5	2	Charles Rozoy	France	1:02.59	
6	1	Luis Armando Andrade Guillen	Mexico	1:04.39	
7	7	Jaime Bailon Galindo	Spain	1:04.66	
8	8	Caio Oliveira	Brazil	1:05.86	

==== Heat 2 ====
Rank	Lane	Name	Nationality	Time	Notes
1	4	Denis Tarasov	Russia	58.65	Q
2	5	Konstantin Lisenkov	Russia	59.03	Q
3	3	Song Maodang	China	1:00.34	Q
4	6	Thomas Young	Great Britain	1:01.85	Q
5	7	Zack McAllister	Canada	1:02.88	AM
6	1	Niels Korfitz Mortensen	Denmark	1:04.36	
7	2	Sam Hynd	Great Britain	1:05.21	
8	8	Evan Ryan Austin	United States	1:05.58	

=== Final ===
Competed at 19:22.

Rank	Lane	Name	Nationality	Time	Notes
1st place, gold medalist(s)	5	Wang Yinan	China	56.58	WR
2nd place, silver medalist(s)	4	Denis Tarasov	Russia	57.52	EU
3rd place, bronze medalist(s)	3	Konstantin Lisenkov	Russia	58.33	
4	6	Maurice Deelen	Netherlands	58.65	
5	2	Song Maodang	China	59.86	
6	8	Thomas Young	Great Britain	1:00.53	
7	7	Sean Fraser	Great Britain	1:00.58	
8	1	Blake Cochrane	Australia	1:01.07	

Q = qualified for final. WR = World Record. AM = Americas Record. EU = European Record.
