= Swimming at the 2016 Summer Paralympics – Men's 100 metre freestyle S8 =

Men's 100 metre freestyle S8 at the XV Paralympic Games
- Venue: Olympic Aquatics Stadium
- Dates: 11 September 2016
- Competitors: 15 from 12 nations

Medalists
1st place, gold medalist(s)		Yinan Wang	China
2nd place, silver medalist(s)		Maodang Song	China
3rd place, bronze medalist(s)		Josef Craig	Great Britain

The Men's 100 metre freestyle S8 event at the 2016 Paralympic Games took place on 11 September 2016, at the Olympic Aquatics Stadium. Two heats were held. The swimmers with the eight fastest times advanced to the final.

== Heats ==
=== Heat 1 ===
11:12 11 September 2016:

Rank	Lane	Name	Nationality	Time	Notes
1	4	Josef Craig	Great Britain	58.73	Q
2	6	Guanglong Yang	China	59.33	Q
3	5	Oliver Hynd	Great Britain	59.62	Q
4	7	Inigo Llopis Sanz	Spain	1:01.96	
5	3	Blake Cochrane	Australia	1:02.12	
6	2	Niels Mortensen	Denmark	1:02.96	
7	1	Evan Austin	United States	1:05.95	

=== Heat 2 ===
11:16 11 September 2016:

Rank	Lane	Name	Nationality	Time	Notes
1	4	Yinan Wang	China	59.03	Q
2	3	Maodang Song	China	59.68	Q
3	5	Bohdan Hrynenko	Ukraine	59.82	Q
4	2	Luis Armando Andrade Guillen	Mexico	1:01.12	Q
5	6	Zack McAllister	Canada	1:01.36	Q
6	7	Caio Oliveira	Brazil	1:02.99	
7	1	Torben Schmidtke	Germany	1:03.75	
8	8	Ernie Gawilan	Philippines	1:06.64	

== Final ==
19:29 11 September 2016:

Rank	Lane	Name	Nationality	Time	Notes
1st place, gold medalist(s)	5	Yinan Wang	China	56.80	
2nd place, silver medalist(s)	2	Maodang Song	China	58.13	
3rd place, bronze medalist(s)	4	Josef Craig	Great Britain	58.19	
4	6	Oliver Hynd	Great Britain	58.85	
5	3	Guanglong Yang	China	59.17	
6	7	Bohdan Hrynenko	Ukraine	59.74	
7	8	Zack McAllister	Canada	1:01.37	
8	1	Luis Armando Andrade Guillen	Mexico	1:01.90	
