= Swimming at the 2016 Summer Paralympics – Men's 100 metre butterfly S8 =

Men's 100 metre butterfly S8 at the XV Paralympic Games
- Venue: Olympic Aquatics Stadium
- Dates: 9 September 2016
- Competitors: 12 from 9 nations

Medalists
1st place, gold medalist(s)		Maodang Song	China
2nd place, silver medalist(s)		Haijiao Xu	China
3rd place, bronze medalist(s)		Guanglong Yang	China

The Men's 100 metre butterfly S8 event at the 2016 Paralympic Games took place on 9 September 2016, at the Olympic Aquatics Stadium. Two heats were held. The swimmers with the eight fastest times advanced to the final.

== Heats ==
=== Heat 1 ===
11:19 9 September 2016:

Rank	Lane	Name	Nationality	Time	Notes
1	5	Guanglong Yang	China	1:01.02	Q
2	4	Charles Rozoy	France	1:01.15	Q
3	2	Andreas Onea	Austria	1:04.84	Q
4	3	Jesse Aungles	Australia	1:05.37	Q
5	6	Niels Mortensen	Denmark	1:05.99	
6	7	Rudy Garcia-Tolson	United States	1:09.73	

=== Heat 2 ===
11:23 9 September 2016:

Rank	Lane	Name	Nationality	Time	Notes
1	5	Haijiao Xu	China	1:01.01	Q
2	4	Maodang Song	China	1:01.56	Q
3	3	Luis Armando Andrade Guillen	Mexico	1:03.91	Q
4	6	Evan Austin	United States	1:05.94	Q
5	2	David Carreira	Portugal	1:07.43	
6	7	Gabriel Sousa	Brazil	1:08.59	

== Final ==
20:15 9 September 2016:

Rank	Lane	Name	Nationality	Time	Notes
1st place, gold medalist(s)	6	Maodang Song	China	59.19	WR
2nd place, silver medalist(s)	4	Haijiao Xu	China	1:00.08	
3rd place, bronze medalist(s)	5	Guanglong Yang	China	1:01.18	
4	3	Charles Rozoy	France	1:01.40	
5	2	Luis Armando Andrade Guillen	Mexico	1:03.30	
6	7	Andreas Onea	Austria	1:05.23	
7	1	Jesse Aungles	Australia	1:06.60	
8	8	Evan Austin	United States	1:07.75	
