= Swimming at the 2012 Summer Paralympics – Men's 50 metre freestyle S8 =

Event at the 2012 Summer Paralympics

Men's 50m Freestyle S8 at the XIV Paralympic Games
- Venue: London Aquatics Centre
- Dates: 3 September 2012
- Competitors: 15 from 11 nations
- Winning time: 25.82

Medalists
1st place, gold medalist(s)		Denis Tarasov	Russia
2nd place, silver medalist(s)		Maurice Deelen	Netherlands
3rd place, bronze medalist(s)		Wang Yinan	China

The men's 50m freestyle S8 event at the 2012 Summer Paralympics took place at the London Aquatics Centre on 3 September. There were two heats; the swimmers with the eight fastest times advanced to the final.

== Results ==
=== Heats ===
Competed from 11:34.

==== Heat 1 ====
Rank	Lane	Name	Nationality	Time	Notes
1	4	Maurice Deelen	Netherlands	26.48	Q
2	5	Wang Yinan	China	26.74	Q
3	3	Charles Rozoy	France	27.77	Q
4	6	Guo Jun	China	27.86	
5	2	Sean Fraser	Great Britain	28.20	
6	1	Ferenc Csuri	Hungary	29.06	
7	7	Niels Korfitz Mortensen	Denmark	29.24	

==== Heat 2 ====
Rank	Lane	Name	Nationality	Time	Notes
1	4	Denis Tarasov	Russia	25.92	Q, WR
2	5	Konstantin Lisenkov	Russia	26.92	Q
3	3	Yang Feng	China	27.41	Q
4	6	Blake Cochrane	Australia	27.81	Q
4	7	Thomas Young	Great Britain	27.81	Q
6	2	Jaime Bailon Galindo	Spain	28.16	
7	8	Sharath Gayakwad	India	28.98	
8	1	Zack McAllister	Canada	29.29	

=== Final ===
Competed at 20:00.

Rank	Lane	Name	Nationality	Time	Notes
1st place, gold medalist(s)	4	Denis Tarasov	Russia	25.82	WR
2nd place, silver medalist(s)	5	Maurice Deelen	Netherlands	26.29	
3rd place, bronze medalist(s)	3	Wang Yinan	China	26.31	AS
4	6	Konstantin Lisenkov	Russia	26.78	
5	2	Yang Feng	China	27.38	
6	1	Blake Cochrane	Australia	27.64	
7	8	Thomas Young	Great Britain	27.71	
8	7	Charles Rozoy	France	27.80	

Q = qualified for final. WR = World Record.
