= Spain at the 2012 Summer Paralympics =

- IPC code: ESP
- NPC: Spanish Paralympic Committee
- Website: www.paralimpicos.es (in Spanish)

in London
- Competitors: 142 in 15 sports
- Flag bearer: Teresa Perales
- Medals Ranked 17th: Gold 8 Silver 18 Bronze 16 Total 42

Summer Paralympics appearances (overview)
- 1968; 1972; 1976; 1980; 1984; 1988; 1992; 1996; 2000; 2004; 2008; 2012; 2016; 2020; 2024

Spain competed at the 2012 Summer Paralympics in London, United Kingdom, from 29 August to 9 September 2012.

Spain sent 142 competitors to London, 23% of whom were women. The team was composed of 224 people, with 127 sportspeople and 15 guides, and 82 support staff. They competed in 15 different sports, and 74% of the competitors had connections to a high performance sport center in Spain.

== Medalists ==
The Spanish Paralympic Committee had €600,000 to allocate to Spanish Paralympic medalists. For sportspeople eligible for only one medal, they were eligible for €15,000 for a gold, €7,500 for a silver and €4,500 for a bronze. For sportspeople eligible for more than one medal, golds were €10,000, silvers were worth €5,000 and bronze medals were worth €3,000. In team sports, gold medals were worth €5,000, silver medals were worth €2,500 and bronze medals were worth €1,500.

Medal	Name	Sport	Event	Date
Gold	Alfonso Cabello	Cycling	Men's 1 km time trial C4-5	31 August
Gold	María del Carmen Herrera Gómez	Judo	Women's 70 kg	1 September
Gold	David Casinos	Athletics	Men's discus throw F11	2 September
Gold	José Antonio Expósito Piñeiro	Athletics	Men's long jump F20	4 September
Gold	Christian Venge	Cycling	Men's road time trial B	5 September
Gold	Michelle Alonso	Swimming	Women's 100 metre breaststroke SB14	6 September
Gold	Teresa Perales	Swimming	Women's 100 metre freestyle S5	8 September
Gold	Alberto Suárez Laso	Athletics	Men's Marathon - T12	9 September
Silver	Enrique Floriano	Swimming	Men's 400 metre freestyle S12	30 August
Silver	Sebastián Rodríguez	Swimming	Men's 50 metre freestyle S5	30 August
Silver	Teresa Perales	Swimming	Women's 50 metre freestyle S5	30 August
Silver	Sarai Gascón	Swimming	Women's 100 metre butterfly S9	30 August
Silver	José Enrique Porto Lareo; José Antonio Villanueva Trinidad (guide)	Cycling	Men's 1km time trial B	1 September
Silver	Sebastián Rodríguez	Swimming	Men's 200 metre freestyle S5	1 September
Silver	Teresa Perales	Swimming	Women's 200 metre freestyle S5	1 September
Silver	Álvaro Valera	Table tennis	Men's individual C6	2 September
Silver	Miguel Luque	Swimming	Men's 50 metre breaststroke SB3	3 September
Silver	Juan Antonio Saavedra Reinaldo	Shooting	Mixed 50 metre rifle prone SH1	4 September
Silver	Elena Congost	Athletics	Women's 1500 metres T12	4 September
Silver	Richard Oribe	Swimming	Men's 100 metre freestyle S4	5 September
Silver	Enhamed Enhamed	Swimming	Men's 100 metre butterfly S11	6 September
Silver	Enhamed Enhamed	Swimming	Men's 400 metre freestyle S11	7 September
Silver	Jordi Morales; Álvaro Valera	Table tennis	Men's team C6-8	7 September
Silver	Teresa Perales	Swimming	Women's 50 metre butterfly S5	7 September
Silver	Josefa Benítez; María Noriega (guide)	Cycling	Women's road race B	8 September
Silver	Abderrahman Ait Khamouch	Athletics	Men's Marathon - T46	9 September
Bronze	Miguel Ángel Clemente Solano; Diego Javier Muñoz (guide)	Cycling	Men's individual pursuit B	30 August
Bronze	Deborah Font	Swimming	Women's 400 metre freestyle S12	30 August
Bronze	Monica Merenciano Herrero	Judo	Women's 57 kg	31 August
Bronze	Marta Arce Payno	Judo	Women's 63 kg	31 August
Bronze	Teresa Perales	Swimming	Women's 200 metre individual medley SM5	31 August
Bronze	Enhamed Enhamed	Swimming	Men's 50 metre freestyle S11	1 September
Bronze	José Enrique Porto Lareo; José Antonio Villanueva Trinidad (guide)	Cycling	Men's sprint B	2 September
Bronze	Ricardo Ten	Swimming	Men's 100 metre breaststroke SB4	4 September
Bronze	Teresa Perales	Swimming	Women's 100 metre breaststroke SB4	4 September
Bronze	Maurice Eckhard	Cycling	Men's road time trial C2	5 September
Bronze	José Antonio Mari	Swimming	Men's 50 metre freestyle S9	5 September
Bronze	Sarai Gascón	Swimming	Women's 100 metre freestyle S9	7 September
Bronze	Spain national football 5-a-side team Álvaro González Alcaraz; José Luis Giera Tejuelo; Francisco Muñoz Pérez; Adolfo Acosta Rodríguez; José López Ramírez; Alfredo Cuadrado Freire; Antonio Martín Gaitán; Youssef El Haddaoui Rabii; Marcelo Rosado Carrasco; Raúl Díaz Ortín	Football 5-a-side	Men's Football 5-a-side - B1	8 September
Bronze	Sebastián Rodríguez	Swimming	Men's 100 metre freestyle S5	8 September
Bronze	Richard Oribe	Swimming	Men's 200 metre freestyle S4	8 September
Bronze	Jorge Cardona; José Manuel Ruiz	Table tennis	Men's team C9-10	8 September

== Archery ==
=== Men ===
Athlete	Event	Ranking round		Round of 32	Round of 16	Quarterfinals	Semifinals	Finals	
Athlete	Event	Score	Seed	Opposition score	Opposition score	Opposition score	Opposition score	Opposition score	Rank
Guillermo Rodriguez Gonzalez	Men's individual compound open	649	13	Shcherbakov (RUS); W 6–4	Stubbs (GBR); W 6–4	Simonelli (ITA); W 6–4	Stutzman (USA); L 4–6	Hancı (TUR); L 2–6	4
Jose Marin Rodriguez	Men's individual recurve W1/W2	591	11	Ajima (JPN); W 6–0	Jung Y J (KOR); L 2–6	Did not advance			

=== Women ===
Athlete	Event	Ranking round		Round of 32	Round of 16	Quarterfinals	Semifinals	Finals	
Athlete	Event	Score	Seed	Opposition score	Opposition score	Opposition score	Opposition score	Opposition score	Rank
Maria Rubio Larrion	Women's individual compound open	637	9	—N/a	Britton (GBR); W 6–4	Brown (GBR); L 4–6	Did not advance		

== Athletics ==
Spain sent 24 track and field competitors to London. Joan Munar Martínez was the youngest member of the team at 16 years of age. Competitors in track and field for Spain include Elena Congost Mohedano, José Martínez Morote and Antonio Andujar Arroyo.

Men's track

Athlete	Event	Heats		Semifinal		Final	
Athlete	Event	Result	Rank	Result	Rank	Result	Rank
Abderrahman Ait Khamouch	Marathon T46	—N/a				2:31:04	2nd place, silver medalist(s)
Lorenzo Albaladejo Martinez	100m T38	—N/a				11.79	6
Lorenzo Albaladejo Martinez	200m T38	23.61	5 q	—N/a		23.76	7
Abel Avila	1500m T13	4:17.14	10	Did not advance			
Ignacio Avila	800m T12	1:58.00	3	Did not advance			
Ignacio Avila	1500m T13	3:57.69	7 q	—N/a		4:04.83	11
Rafael Botello Jimenez	5000m T54	11:33.80	8	Did not advance			
Rafael Botello Jimenez	Marathon T54	—N/a				1:33:05	9
Gerard Desgarrega Puigdevall; Guide: Alejandro Guerrero Diaz	200m T12	23.19	4	Did not advance			
Gerard Desgarrega Puigdevall; Guide: Alejandro Guerrero Diaz	400m T12	50.91	2 q	50.43	3 q	50.68	4
José Manuel González	400m T36	—N/a				1:01.51	7
José Manuel González	800m T36	—N/a				2:15.99	5
Joan Munar Martinez	100m T13	11.60	12	Did not advance			
Joan Munar Martinez	200m T13	DNS		Did not advance			
Gustavo Nieves	5000m T12	—N/a				14:22.93	4
Jose Pampano	800m T36	—N/a				2:21.48	6
Ricardo de Pedraza Losa; Guide: Oriol Sellares Martinez	5000m T11	—N/a				16:42.11	11
Martin Parejo Maza; Guide: Joan Borrisser Roldan	100m T11	12.01	3	Did not advance			
Xavier Porras; Guide: Enric Martin Panades	100m T11	11.80	2 q	11.79	4	Did not advance	
Roger Puigbo Verdaguer	400m T53	53.29	5	Did not advance			
Roger Puigbo Verdaguer	800m T53	1:47.90	5	Did not advance			
Roger Puigbo Verdaguer	5000m T54	10:57.60	6	Did not advance			
Roger Puigbo Verdaguer	Marathon T54	—N/a				DNF	
Maximiliano Rodriguez	100m T12	11.12	2 q	—N/a		11.20	4
Maximiliano Rodriguez	200m T12	22.87	3 q	23.18	2	Did not advance	
Alberto Suarez Laso	5000m T12	—N/a				14:50.28	6
Alberto Suarez Laso	Marathon T12	—N/a				2:24:50 WR	1st place, gold medalist(s)
Gerard Desgarrega Puigdevall; Joan Munar Martinez; Xavier Porras; Maximiliano Rodriguez	4 × 100 m relay T11-13	—N/a				DNF	

Men's field

Athlete	Event	Final		
Athlete	Event	Result	Points	Rank
Antonio Andujar Arroyo	Triple jump F46	13.38	—N/a	8
José Antonio Expósito	Long jump F20	7.25 PR	—N/a	1st place, gold medalist(s)
David Casino	Discus throw F11	38.41	—N/a	1st place, gold medalist(s)
David Casino	Shot put F11-12	13.01	942	5
Martin Parejo Maza	Long jump F11	5.61	—N/a	8
Martin Parejo Maza	Triple jump F11	10.94	—N/a	10
Xavier Porras	Long jump F11	6.08	—N/a	5
Xavier Porras	Triple jump F11	12.19	—N/a	5

Women's track

Athlete	Event	Heats		Semifinal		Final	
Athlete	Event	Result	Rank	Result	Rank	Result	Rank
Elena Congost	1500m T12	—N/a				4:43.53	2nd place, silver medalist(s)
Sara Martinez	100m T12	13.27	3	Did not advance			
Eva Ngui	100m T12	13.32	3	Did not advance			

Women's field

Athlete	Event	Final		
Athlete	Event	Result	Points	Rank
Ruth Aguilar Fulgencio	Javelin throw F54/55/56	12.12	—N/a	11
Ruth Aguilar Fulgencio	Shot put F54-56	5.29	393	16
Sara Martinez	Long jump F11/12	5.66	844	5

== Boccia ==
=== Individual events ===
Athlete	Event	Seeding matches	Round of 32	Round of 16	Quarterfinals	Semifinals	Finals	
Athlete	Event	Opposition Score	Opposition Score	Opposition Score	Opposition Score	Opposition Score	Opposition Score	Rank
José Prado Prado	Mixed individual BC1	Bye		Tadtong (THA); L 4–5	Did not advance			
Pedro Cordero Martin	Mixed individual BC2	Bye	Sousa Santos (BRA); L 1–9	Did not advance				
Manuel Martin Perez	Mixed individual BC2	Bye	Papadakis (GRE); W 4–3	Valente (POR); L 3-3	Did not advance			
Veronica Pamies Morera	Mixed individual BC3	Bye	Thomas (GBR); L 1–8	Did not advance				
Sandra Pena Cortes	Mixed individual BC3	Bye	Hagdahl (SWE); W 3–2	de Laender (BEL); L 2–8	Did not advance			
José Rodríguez Vázquez	Mixed individual BC3	Bye	McCowan (GBR); L 0–11	Did not advance				
Jose Dueso Villar	Mixed individual BC4	Zheng Y (CHN); L 0–9	—N/a	Procházka (CZE); L 4–6	Did not advance			

=== Pairs and team events ===
Athlete	Event	Pool matches				Quarterfinals	Semifinals	Finals	
Athlete	Event	Opposition Score	Opposition Score	Opposition Score	Rank	Opposition Score	Opposition Score	Opposition Score	Rank
Veronica Pamies Morera; Sandra Pena Cortes; Jose Rodriguez Vazquez	Pairs BC3	Belgium (BEL); L 1–12	Portugal (POR); L 0–7	Thailand (THA); L 0–9	4	Did not advance			
Francisco Beltran Manero; Pedro Cordero Martin; Manuel Martin Perez; Jose Prado Prado	Team BC1-2	Japan (JPN); L 3–8	Hong Kong (HKG); L 4–6	—N/a	3	Did not advance			

== Football 5-a-side ==
Spain qualified for the 5-a-side tournament.

The following is the Spain squad in the football 5-a-side tournament of the 2012 Summer Paralympics.

No.	Pos.	Player	Age	Club
1	GK	Álvaro González Alcaraz	37	C.D. De Ciegos De Málaga
3	FW	José Luis Giera Tejuelo	27	Once Alicante
4	MF	Francisco Muñoz Pérez	26	Once Tarragona
6	DF	Adolfo Acosta Rodríguez	31	Once Madrid
7	FW	José López Ramírez	36	Once Tarragona
8	DF	Alfredo Cuadrado Freire	43	C.D. De Ciegos De Málaga
9	MF	Antonio Martín Gaitán	30	C.D. De Ciegos De Málaga
10	MF	Youssef El Haddaoui	23	Once Tarragona
11	MF	Marcelo Rosado Carrasco	33	C.D. De Ciegos De Málaga
13	GK	Raúl Díaz Ortín	32	Once Murcia

Group play

Pos	Team	Pld	W	D	L	GF	GA	GD	Pts	Qualification
1	Spain (ESP)	3	1	2	0	3	1	+2	5	Qualified for the medal round
2	Argentina (ARG)	3	1	2	0	2	0	+2	5	Qualified for the medal round
3	Iran (IRI)	3	1	0	2	1	4	−3	3	Qualified for the classification round
4	Great Britain (GBR)	3	0	2	1	1	2	−1	2	Qualified for the classification round

31 August 2012
15:30

Great Britain	1–1	Spain
Clarke 22'	Report	Martín Gaitán 20' (pen.)

Riverbank Arena
Attendance: 2,630
Referee: Lucio Morgado (Brazil)

2 September 2012
13:30

Spain	2–0	Iran
Martín Gaitán 13', 22'	Report

Riverbank Arena
Attendance: 1,996
Referee: Lucio Morgado (Brazil)

4 September 2012
13:30

Spain	0–0	Argentina
	Report

Riverbank Arena
Attendance: 1,836
Referee: Lucio Morgado (Brazil)

Semifinal

6 September 2012
13:30

Spain	0–2	France
	Report	Villeroux 23', 49'

Riverbank Arena
Attendance: 1,796
Referee: Lucio Morgado (Brazil)

Bronze medal match

8 September 2012
13:30

Spain	0–0 (a.e.t.)	Argentina
	Report
Penalties
Martín Gaitán (penalty scored); Rosado Carrasco (penalty missed); Giera Tejuelo (penalty missed)	1–0	(penalty missed) Rodriguez; (penalty missed) Velo; (penalty missed) Deldo

Riverbank Arena
Attendance: 1,785
Referee: Lucio Morgado (Brazil)

== Judo ==
Men

Athlete	Event	Quarterfinals	Semifinals	Repechage round 1	Repechage round 2	Final/ Bronze medal contest
Athlete	Event	Opposition Result	Opposition Result	Opposition Result	Opposition Result	Opposition Result
David García del Valle	Men's 66kg	Falcon (VEN); W 0011–0012	Khorava (UKR); L 0000–0100	—N/a		Ali Lamri (ALG); L 0000–0100
Abel Vazquez Cortijo	Men's 81kg	Shevchenko (RUS); W 0100–0020	Effron (ARG); L 0000–0200	—N/a		Cruz Alonso (CUB); L 0013–0102

Women

Athlete	Event	Quarterfinals	Semifinals	Repechage	Final/ Bronze medal contest
Athlete	Event	Opposition Result	Opposition Result	Opposition Result	Opposition Result
Laura García Benítez	Women's 48kg	Halinska (UKR); L 0000–0101	—N/a	Potapova (RUS); L 0000–0100	Did not advance
Monica Merenciano Herrero	Women's 57kg	Simon (USA); W 0101–0000	da Silva Teixeira (BRA); L 0002–1011	—N/a	Coadou (FRA); W 1011-0002 (bronze)
Marta Arce Payno	Women's 63kg	Pernheim (SWE); W 0210–0000	Rodriguez Clark (CUB); L 0100–1000	—N/a	Tolppanen (FIN); W 1000-0100 (bronze)
Carmen Herrera	Women's 70kg	Ruvalcaba (MEX); W 0040–0002	Zhou (CHN); W 0010–0002	—N/a	Savostyanova (RUS); W 0220-0002 (gold)

== Powerlifting ==
Athlete	Event	Result	Rank
Loida Zabala Ollero	Women's 48kg	98.0	5

== Rowing ==
Spain sent only one rower to London, Juan Pablo Barcia.

== Sailing ==
Athlete	Event	Race											Total points	Net points Total	Rank
Athlete	Event	1	2	3	4	5	6	7	8	9	10	11	Total points	Net points Total	Rank
Francisco Llobet	2.4mR	(16)	15	16	16	15	12	16	(17)	12	13		148	131	16
Carolina Lopez Rodriguez; Fernando Alvarez	SKUD 18	7	(10)	9	8	7	8	8	7	7	7		84	73	8

== Shooting ==
Athlete	Event	Qualification		Final		
Athlete	Event	Score	Rank	Score	Total	Rank
Miquel Orobitg Guitart	Men's 10m air rifle standing SH1	555	27	Did not advance		
Miquel Orobitg Guitart	Men's 50m rifle 3 positions SH1	1102	22	Did not advance		
Miquel Orobitg Guitart	Mixed 50m rifle prone SH1	568	44	Did not advance		
Juan Antonio Saavedra Reinaldo	Mixed 10m air rifle standing SH2	596	=15	Did not advance		
Juan Antonio Saavedra Reinaldo	Mixed 50m rifle prone SH1	590	3 Q	104.6	694.6	2nd place, silver medalist(s)
Francisco Ángel Soriano San Martin	Men's 10m air pistol SH1	554	20	Did not advance		
Francisco Ángel Soriano San Martin	Mixed 25m pistol SH1	554	11	Did not advance		
Francisco Ángel Soriano San Martin	Mixed 50m pistol SH1	519	15	Did not advance		

== Swimming ==
Men

Athlete	Event	Heats		Final	
Athlete	Event	Result	Rank	Result	Rank
Jaime Bailon Galindo	50m freestyle S8	28.16	6	Did not advance	
Jaime Bailon Galindo	100m freestyle S8	1:04.66	7	Did not advance	
Jaime Bailon Galindo	100m butterfly S8	1:06.54	3 Q	1:06.35	8
Jose Ramon Cantero Elvira	50m freestyle S12	28.41	6	Did not advance	
Jose Ramon Cantero Elvira	100m freestyle S12	1:00.30	6	Did not advance	
Jose Ramon Cantero Elvira	400m freestyle S12	4:40.45	5	Did not advance	
Jose Ramon Cantero Elvira	100m butterfly S12	1:09.20	8	Did not advance	
Jose Ramon Cantero Elvira	200m individual medley SM12	2:32.69	6	Did not advance	
Pablo Cimadevila	100m breaststroke SB4	1:43.94	2 Q	1:45.46	5
Jesus Collado	400m freestyle S9	4:23.57	2 Q	4:19.06	5
Jesus Collado	100m backstroke S9	1:07.58	5	Did not advance	
Jesus Collado	100m butterfly S9	1:02.57	5 Q	1:01.28	5
Javier Crespo	100m breaststroke SB9	1:13.97	4	Did not advance	
Enhamed Enhamed	50m freestyle S11	27.34	4 Q	26.37	3rd place, bronze medalist(s)
Enhamed Enhamed	100m freestyle S11	1:02.08	3 Q	1:00.76	4
Enhamed Enhamed	400m freestyle S11	4:56.25	2 Q	4:38.24	2nd place, silver medalist(s)
Enhamed Enhamed	100m butterfly S11	1:06.54	3 Q	1:03.93	2nd place, silver medalist(s)
Enrique Floriano	400m freestyle S12	4:19.38	1 Q	4:14.77	2nd place, silver medalist(s)
Enrique Floriano	100m breaststroke SB12	1:11.61	3 Q	1:11.42	6
Enrique Floriano	200m individual medley SM12	2:16.19	2 Q	2:16.18	5
Omar Font	50m freestyle S12	25.18	2 Q	24.75	4
Omar Font	100m freestyle S12	55.28	3 Q	54.70	4
Omar Font	400m freestyle S12	4:30.13	3 Q	4:21.01	4
Omar Font	100m butterfly S12	1:01.07	3 Q	1:00.59	6
Albert Gelis	50m freestyle S12	27.13	5	Did not advance	
Albert Gelis	100m backstroke S12	1:04.32	4 Q	1:03.77	6
Albert Gelis	100m butterfly S12	1:03.05	5	Did not advance	
Vicente Gil	50m breaststroke SB3	54.49	4 Q	53.96	8
Javier Hernandez Aguiran	50m backstroke S3	58.29	5 Q	56.89	8
Javier Hernandez Aguiran	50m breaststroke SB3	58.89	6	Did not advance	
David Levecq	50m freestyle S10	25.27	3	Did not advance	
David Levecq	100m freestyle S10	55.15	4	Did not advance	
David Levecq	100m butterfly S10	58.40	1 Q	57.90	4
Miguel Luque	50m backstroke S5	49.36	6	Did not advance	
Miguel Luque	50m butterfly S5	54.88	7	Did not advance	
Miguel Luque	50m breaststroke SB3	50.42	1 Q	50.18	2nd place, silver medalist(s)
Miguel Luque	150m individual medley SM4	2:49.31	5 Q	2:48.53	7
Jose Antonio Mari Alcaraz	50m freestyle S9	26.18	1 Q	25.93	3rd place, bronze medalist(s)
Jose Antonio Mari Alcaraz	100m freestyle S9	57.23	1 Q	56.75	4
Jose Antonio Mari Alcaraz	400m freestyle S9	4:23.88	1 Q	4:18.98	4
Jose Antonio Mari Alcaraz	100m butterfly S9	1:01.65	2 Q	1:00.98	4
Miguel Angel Martinez Tajuelo	50m backstroke S3	51.69	3 Q	51.83	4
Israel Oliver	400m freestyle S11	4:58.41	4 Q	4:48.86	4
Israel Oliver	100m backstroke S11	1:12.87	4 Q	1:11.58	6
Israel Oliver	100m breaststroke SB11	1:17.02	2 Q	1:16.46	5
Israel Oliver	100m butterfly S11	1:05.51	1 Q	1:07.72	7
Richard Oribe	50m freestyle S4	39.80	3 Q	39.47	4
Richard Oribe	100m freestyle S4	1:25.25	2 Q	1:25.33	2nd place, silver medalist(s)
Richard Oribe	200m freestyle S4	3:05.71	2 Q	3:01.62	3rd place, bronze medalist(s)
Edgar Quiros Baltanas	100m breaststroke SB13	1:09.30	2 Q	1:08.06	6
Edgar Quiros Baltanas	200m individual medley SM13	2:27.59	5	Did not advance	
Sebastian Rodriguez	50m freestyle S5	33.80	1 Q	33.44	2nd place, silver medalist(s)
Sebastian Rodriguez	100m freestyle S5	1:17.37	1 Q	1:15.70	3rd place, bronze medalist(s)
Sebastian Rodriguez	200m freestyle S5	2:45.96	2 Q	2:43.11	2nd place, silver medalist(s)
Ander Romarate Aguirre	100m backstroke S8	1:12.00	4 Q	1:12.01	7
Ander Romarate Aguirre	100m breaststroke SB7	1:31.84	5	Did not advance	
Alejandro Sanchez Palomero	100m butterfly S8	1:12.72	6	Did not advance	
Alejandro Sanchez Palomero	100m breaststroke SB8	1:20.47	6	Did not advance	
Alejandro Sanchez Palomero	200m individual medley SM8	2:43.95	6	Did not advance	
Ricardo Ten	50m backstroke S5	43.07	4	Did not advance	
Ricardo Ten	50m butterfly S5	43.29	3 Q	43.65	8
Ricardo Ten	100m breaststroke SB4	1:37.40	1 Q	1:37.23	3rd place, bronze medalist(s)
Xavier Torres	150m individual medley SM4	2:48.72	2 Q	2:42.21	5
Jesus Collado; David Levecq; Jose Antonio Mari Alcaraz; Sebastian Rodriguez	4 × 100 m freestyle relay 34pts	4:07.70	4 Q	4:05.49	8
Jaime Bailon Galindo; Javier Crespo; Jose Antonio Mari Alcaraz; Ander Romarate Aguirre	4 × 100 m medley relay 34pts	4:31.85	4 Q	4:31.04	8

Women

Athlete	Event	Heats		Final	
Athlete	Event	Result	Rank	Result	Rank
Amaya Alonso	100m freestyle S12	1:07.77	4	Did not advance	
Amaya Alonso	400m freestyle S12	4:53.07	2 Q	4:53.59	6
Amaya Alonso	100m butterfly S12	—N/a		1:13.75	6
Amaya Alonso	100m backstroke S12	DSQ		Did not advance	
Amaya Alonso	200m individual medley SM12	2:44.63	5 Q	2:38.78	5
Michelle Alonso	200m freestyle S14	2:23.37	4	Did not advance	
Michelle Alonso	100m backstroke S14	1:22.71	5	Did not advance	
Michelle Alonso	100m breaststroke SB14	1:18.78 PR	1 Q	1:16.85 WR	1st place, gold medalist(s)
Carla Casals	100m butterfly S12	—N/a		1:10.44	4
Carla Casals	100m breaststroke SB12	1:23.95	4 Q	1:23.22	6
Carla Casals	200m individual medley SM12	2:42.48	4 Q	2:44.09	8
Julia Castello Farre	100m backstroke S6	1:31.78	3 Q	1:31.67	5
Julia Castello Farre	100m breaststroke SB5	2:01.18	5	Did not advance	
Julia Castello Farre	200m individual medley SM6	3:40.68	8	Did not advance	
Begona Curero	50m freestyle S13	30.45	11	Did not advance	
Begona Curero	100m freestyle S13	1:08.45	7	Did not advance	
Begona Curero	100m breaststroke SB13	1:25.12	4 Q	1:26.23	8
Deborah Font	50m freestyle S12	28.68	5 Q	28.75	7
Deborah Font	100m freestyle S12	1:02.62	2 Q	1:02.06	5
Deborah Font	400m freestyle S12	4:46.72	1 Q	4:39.75	3rd place, bronze medalist(s)
Deborah Font	100m breaststroke SB12	1:23.57	3 Q	1:22.22	4
Deborah Font	200m individual medley SM12	2:40.75	2 Q	2:39.65	6
Sarai Gascon Moreno	50m freestyle S9	29.62	3 Q	29.44	4
Sarai Gascon Moreno	100m freestyle S9	1:04.93	2 Q	1:03.62	3rd place, bronze medalist(s)
Sarai Gascon Moreno	100m butterfly S9	1:11.45	2 Q	1:09.79 EU	2nd place, silver medalist(s)
Sarai Gascon Moreno	100m breaststroke SB9	1:22.61	5 Q	1:21.50	6
Sarai Gascon Moreno	200m individual medley SM9	2:42.49	4 Q	2:40.15	6
Marta Maria Gomez Battelli	100m freestyle S13	1:08.81	6	Did not advance	
Marta Maria Gomez Battelli	100m breaststroke SB13	1:27.89	5	Did not advance	
Marta Maria Gomez Battelli	200m individual medley SM13	2:46.90	5	Did not advance	
Isabel Yinghua Hernandez Santos	100m backstroke S10	1:16.66	6	Did not advance	
Isabel Yinghua Hernandez Santos	100m butterfly S10	1:13.19	4 Q	1:11.97	7
Isabel Yinghua Hernandez Santos	200m individual medley SM10	2:45.98	4	Did not advance	
Lorena Homar Lopez	400m freestyle S6	7:16.32	7	Did not advance	
Lorena Homar Lopez	100m backstroke S6	1:49.63	7	Did not advance	
Lorena Homar Lopez	100m breaststroke SB4	2:18.19	6	Did not advance	
Lorena Homar Lopez	200m individual medley SM5	4:06.39	4 Q	4:03.16	7
Esther Morales	50m freestyle S10	29.92	9	Did not advance	
Esther Morales	100m freestyle S10	1:05.03	4	Did not advance	
Esther Morales	100m backstroke S10	1:16.46	5	Did not advance	
Teresa Perales	50m freestyle S5	37.06	2 Q	36.50	2nd place, silver medalist(s)
Teresa Perales	100m freestyle S5	1:23.39	2 Q	1:18.55	1st place, gold medalist(s)
Teresa Perales	200m freestyle S5	3:05.44	2 Q	2:51.79	2nd place, silver medalist(s)
Teresa Perales	50m butterfly S5	43.22	1 Q	42.67	2nd place, silver medalist(s)
Teresa Perales	100m breaststroke SB4	1:56.90	2 Q	1:56.17	3rd place, bronze medalist(s)
Teresa Perales	200m individual medley SM5	3:33.84	2 Q	3:28.58	3rd place, bronze medalist(s)
Sarai Gascon Moreno; Isabel Yinghua Hernandez Santos; Esther Morales; Teresa Perales	4 × 100 m freestyle relay 34pts	—N/a		4:35.09	4
Sarai Gascon Moreno; Isabel Yinghua Hernandez Santos; Esther Morales; Teresa Perales	4 × 100 m medley relay 34pts	—N/a		5:06.04	5

== Table tennis ==
Men

Athlete	Event	Preliminaries			First round	Quarterfinals	Semifinals	Final / BM	
Athlete	Event	Opposition Result	Opposition Result	Rank	Opposition Result	Opposition Result	Opposition Result	Opposition Result	Rank
Tomas Piñas	Men's singles C3	Ohgren (SWE); L 1–3	Makszin (ROU); W 3–0	1 Q	—N/a	Feng (CHN); L 0–3	Did not advance		
Miguel Rodriguez	Men's singles C3	Breuchle (GER); L 1–3	Kramminger (AUT); L 0–3	3	Did not advance				
Alvaro Valera	Men's singles C6	Bye			—N/a	Chen (CHN); W 3–0	Grundeler (FRA); W 3–0	Thainiyom (THA); L 0–3	2nd place, silver medalist(s)
Jordi Morales	Men's singles C7	Schwinn (GER); W 3–0	Dourbecker (FRA); W 3–1	1 Q	—N/a	Wollmert (GER); L 2–3	Did not advance		
Jorge Cardona	Men's singles C10	Karabec (CZE); L 0–3	Powrozniak (POL); W 3–1	2	Did not advance				
Jose Manuel Ruiz Reyes	Men's singles C10	Bye			—N/a	Berecki (HUN); W 3–2	Chojnowski (POL); L 0–3	Jacobs (INA); L 1–3	4
Jordi Morales; Alvaro Valera	Men's team C6-8	—N/a			South Korea (KOR); W 3–0	China (CHN); W 3–1	Germany (GER); W 3–0	Poland (POL); L 0–3	2nd place, silver medalist(s)
Jorge Cardona; Jose Manuel Ruiz Reyes	Men's team C9-10	—N/a				Hungary (HUN); W 3–0	Poland (POL); L 2–3	Ukraine (UKR); W 3–1	3rd place, bronze medalist(s)

== Wheelchair basketball ==
=== Men's tournament ===
The Spanish men's wheelchair basketball team were in Group A with the United States, Australia, South Africa, Italy and Turkey.

Squad list (classification points)	Group stage		Quarterfinal	Semifinal	Final	
Squad list (classification points)	Opposition Result	Rank	Opposition Result	Opposition Result	Opposition Result	Rank
From: Roberto Mena Perez (4.0); Diego de Paz Pazo (4.0); Bernabe Costas de Miranda (2.5); Daniel Rodriguez Martin (1.0); Francisco Sanchez Lara (1.0); Alejandro Zarzuela Beltran (3.0); Ismael Garcia Moreno (4.0); Asier Garcia Pereiro (4.0); Jesus Romero Martin (3.0); Rafael Muino Gamez (2.0); David Mouriz Dopico (2.5); Jaume Llambi Riera (1.5)		United States; L 63–55				
From: Roberto Mena Perez (4.0); Diego de Paz Pazo (4.0); Bernabe Costas de Miranda (2.5); Daniel Rodriguez Martin (1.0); Francisco Sanchez Lara (1.0); Alejandro Zarzuela Beltran (3.0); Ismael Garcia Moreno (4.0); Asier Garcia Pereiro (4.0); Jesus Romero Martin (3.0); Rafael Muino Gamez (2.0); David Mouriz Dopico (2.5); Jaume Llambi Riera (1.5)		Australia; L 75–59				
From: Roberto Mena Perez (4.0); Diego de Paz Pazo (4.0); Bernabe Costas de Miranda (2.5); Daniel Rodriguez Martin (1.0); Francisco Sanchez Lara (1.0); Alejandro Zarzuela Beltran (3.0); Ismael Garcia Moreno (4.0); Asier Garcia Pereiro (4.0); Jesus Romero Martin (3.0); Rafael Muino Gamez (2.0); David Mouriz Dopico (2.5); Jaume Llambi Riera (1.5)		South Africa; W 74–50				
From: Roberto Mena Perez (4.0); Diego de Paz Pazo (4.0); Bernabe Costas de Miranda (2.5); Daniel Rodriguez Martin (1.0); Francisco Sanchez Lara (1.0); Alejandro Zarzuela Beltran (3.0); Ismael Garcia Moreno (4.0); Asier Garcia Pereiro (4.0); Jesus Romero Martin (3.0); Rafael Muino Gamez (2.0); David Mouriz Dopico (2.5); Jaume Llambi Riera (1.5)		Italy; W 67–40				
From: Roberto Mena Perez (4.0); Diego de Paz Pazo (4.0); Bernabe Costas de Miranda (2.5); Daniel Rodriguez Martin (1.0); Francisco Sanchez Lara (1.0); Alejandro Zarzuela Beltran (3.0); Ismael Garcia Moreno (4.0); Asier Garcia Pereiro (4.0); Jesus Romero Martin (3.0); Rafael Muino Gamez (2.0); David Mouriz Dopico (2.5); Jaume Llambi Riera (1.5)		Turkey; W 67–64				

Group stage

Team	Pld	W	L	PF	PA	PD	Pts	Qualification
Australia	5	5	0	372	259	+113	10	Quarter-finals
Turkey	5	3	2	331	302	+29	8 (Note: Head-to-head score differential: TUR: +6; USA: −1; ESP: −5)	Quarter-finals
United States	5	3	2	330	259	+71	8	Quarter-finals
Spain	5	3	2	322	292	+30	8	Quarter-finals
Italy	5	1	4	260	309	−49	6	Eliminated
South Africa	5	0	5	204	398	−194	5	Eliminated

Rules for classification: 1) Table points, 2) Head-to-head score differential
Notes:

30 August 2012
10:45

Report

Spain	67–40	Italy
Scoring by quarter: 19–12, 20–14, 14–8, 14–6
Pts: De Paz Pazo 18; Rebs: Garcia Moreno 11; Asts: De Paz Pazo, Muiño Gámez 5		Pts: Raimondi, Cavagnini 8 Rebs: Cavagnini 7 Asts: Raimondi, Moukhariq 3

North Greenwich Arena, London
Referees: Rui Marques (BRA)

31 August 2012
15:15

Report

South Africa	50–74	Spain
Scoring by quarter: 11–21, 13–20, 9–19, 17–14
Pts: Jellows, Nortje 11; Rebs: Nortje 9 Asts: Papenfus 5		Pts: Zarzuela Beltrán 24; Rebs: Zarzuela Beltrán 6 Asts: Muiño Gámez 7

North Greenwich Arena, London
Referees: Karen Molina (COL)

1 September 2012
20:45

Report

Australia	75–59	Spain
Scoring by quarter: 20–15, 24–12, 16–23, 15–9
Pts: Norris 25; Rebs: Eveson, Latham 8 Asts: Eveson 7		Pts: García Pereiro 23; Rebs: García Pereiro 6 Asts: De Paz Pazo, Muiño Gámez 5

Basketball Arena, London
Referees: Valerie Farrugia (FRA)

2 September 2012
20:45

Report

Spain	67–64	Turkey
Scoring by quarter: 13–14, 14–16, 21–13, 19–21
Pts: De Paz Pazo 19; Rebs: De Paz Pazo, Zarzuela Beltrán 7 Asts: de Paz Pazo 8		Pts: Gürbulak 18; Rebs: Gürbulak 9 Asts: Gürbulak 4

Basketball Arena, London
Referees: Krunoslav Peić (CRO)

3 September 2012
21:15

Report

United States	63–55	Spain
Scoring by quarter: 15–14, 19–10, 16–15, 13–16
Pts: Nelms 21; Rebs: Jenifer 9 Asts: three players 5		Pts: Muiño Gámez 15; Rebs: Romero Martín 7 Asts: De Paz Pazo 5

North Greenwich Arena, London
Referees: Max Kindervater (GER)

Quarter-final

5 September 2012
19:00

Report

Canada	77–51	Spain
Scoring by quarter: 25–12, 18–13, 14–16, 20–10
Pts: Anderson 16; Rebs: Anderson 14; Asts: Durepos, Anderson 6		Pts: García Moreno 16; Rebs: Zarzuela Beltrán 6 Asts: García Moreno 5

North Greenwich Arena, London
Referees: Matt Wells (AUS)

5th–8th place semi-final

7 September 2012
15:15

Report

Turkey	78–86 (OT)	Spain
Scoring by quarter: 21–18, 16–22, 12–12, 19–16, Overtime: 10–18
Pts: Gürbulak, Gümüş 24; Rebs: Gümüş 9 Asts: Gürbulak 9		Pts: De Paz Pazo 24; Rebs: De Paz Pazo 12; Asts: García Pereiro 10

North Greenwich Arena, London
Referees: Christopher Gregory (GBR)

5th/6th place match

8 September 2012
15:15

Report

Germany	48–67	Spain
Scoring by quarter: 9–10, 14–16, 12–18, 13–23
Pts: Bienek 14; Rebs: Bienek 5 Asts: Wolk 10		Pts: De Paz Pazo 17; Rebs: De Paz Pazo 6 Asts: De Paz Pazo 9

North Greenwich Arena, London
Referees: Christopher Gregory (GBR)

== Wheelchair tennis ==
Athlete	Event	Round of 64	Round of 32	Round of 16	Quarterfinals	Semifinals	Finals
Athlete	Event	Opposition Result	Opposition Result	Opposition Result	Opposition Result	Opposition Result	Opposition Result
Daniel Caverzaschi Arzola	Men's singles	Rahakaruna (SRI); W 6–1, 6–2	Vink (NED); L 1–6, 0–6	Did not advance			
Francesc Tur Blanch	Men's singles	Weekes (AUS); L 4–6, 2–6	Did not advance				
Elena Jacinto Velez	Women's singles	—N/a	Mardones (CHI); L 3–6, 1–6	Did not advance			
Lola Ochoa Ribes	Women's singles	—N/a	Montjane (RSA); L 5–7, 2–6	Did not advance			
Daniel Caverzaschi Arzola; Francesc Tur Blanch	Men's doubles	—N/a	Adewale/Yusuf (NGR); W 6–1, 4–6, 6–4	Olsson/Vikstrom (SWE); L 1–6, 0–6	Did not advance		
Elena Jacinto Velez; Lola Ochoa Ribes	Women's doubles	—N/a		Hwang/Park (KOR); L 1–6, 5–7	Did not advance		

== See also ==
- Spain at the Paralympics
- Spain at the 2012 Summer Olympics
