= Swimming at the 2016 Summer Paralympics – Men's 200 metre individual medley SM8 =

Men's 200 metre individual medley SM8 at the XV Paralympic Games
- Venue: Olympic Aquatics Stadium
- Dates: 17 September 2016
- Competitors: 13 from 10 nations

Medalists
1st place, gold medalist(s)		Oliver Hynd	Great Britain
2nd place, silver medalist(s)		Maodang Song	China
3rd place, bronze medalist(s)		Haijiao Xu	China

The Men's 200 metre individual medley SM8 event at the 2016 Paralympic Games took place on 17 September 2016, at the Olympic Aquatics Stadium. Two heats were held. The swimmers with the eight fastest times advanced to the final.

== Heats ==
=== Heat 1 ===
9:52 17 September 2016:

Rank	Lane	Name	Nationality	Time	Notes
1	4	Maodang Song	China	2:28.21	Q
2	5	Robert Griswold	United States	2:28.32	Q
3	3	Jesse Aungles	Australia	2:31.62	Q
4	2	Charles Rozoy	France	2:33.35	Q
5	6	Andreas Onea	Austria	2:35.34	
6	7	Inigo Llopis Sanz	Spain	2:41.33	

=== Heat 2 ===
9:57 17 September 2016:

Rank	Lane	Name	Nationality	Time	Notes
1	4	Oliver Hynd	Great Britain	2:25.48	Q
2	5	Haijiao Xu	China	2:28.88	Q
3	3	Guanglong Yang	China	2:32.77	Q
4	6	Niels Mortensen	Denmark	2:32.98	Q
5	2	Luis Armando Andrade Guillen	Mexico	2:37.43	
6	7	Evan Austin	United States	2:39.44	
7	1	David Carreira	Portugal	2:45.23	

== Final ==
17:43 17 September 2016:

Rank	Lane	Name	Nationality	Time	Notes
1st place, gold medalist(s)	4	Oliver Hynd	Great Britain	2:20.01	WR
2nd place, silver medalist(s)	5	Maodang Song	China	2:20.79	
3rd place, bronze medalist(s)	6	Haijiao Xu	China	2:21.19	
4	3	Robert Griswold	United States	2:26.99	
5	7	Guanglong Yang	China	2:27.87	
6	2	Jesse Aungles	Australia	2:28.96	
7	1	Niels Mortensen	Denmark	2:29.77	
8	8	Charles Rozoy	France	2:33.82	
