= Swimming at the 2012 Summer Paralympics – Men's 200 metre individual medley SM8 =

Event at the 2012 Summer Paralympics

Men's 200m Ind. Medley SM8 at the XIV Paralympic Games
- Venue: London Aquatics Centre
- Dates: 5 September 2012
- Competitors: 18 from 15 nations
- Winning time: 2:24.63

Medalists
1st place, gold medalist(s)		Oliver Hynd	Great Britain
2nd place, silver medalist(s)		Wang Jiachao	China
3rd place, bronze medalist(s)		Maurice Deelen	Netherlands

The men's 200m ind. medley SM8 event at the 2012 Summer Paralympics took place at the London Aquatics Centre on 5 September. There were three heats; the swimmers with the eight fastest times advanced to the final.

== Results ==
=== Heats ===
Competed from 09:30.

==== Heat 1 ====
Rank	Lane	Name	Nationality	Time	Notes
1	4	Charles Rozoy	France	2:31.53	Q
2	7	Andreas Onea	Austria	2:35.74	
3	3	Evgeny Zimin	Russia	2:35.92	
4	5	Thomas Young	Great Britain	2:35.98	
5	6	Niels Korfitz Mortensen	Denmark	2:36.92	
6	2	Sharath Gayakwad	India	2:38.17	

==== Heat 2 ====
Rank	Lane	Name	Nationality	Time	Notes
1	5	Maurice Deelen	Netherlands	2:27.44	Q
2	4	Wang Jiachao	China	2:29.49	Q
3	3	Ferenc Csuri	Hungary	2:34.82	Q
4	6	Blake Cochrane	Australia	2:35.33	Q
5	2	Luis Armando Andrade Guillen	Mexico	2:36.73	
6	7	Michele Ferrarin	Italy	2:40.53	

==== Heat 3 ====
Rank	Lane	Name	Nationality	Time	Notes
1	4	Oliver Hynd	Great Britain	2:27.95	Q
2	5	Sam Hynd	Great Britain	2:28.88	Q
3	3	Konstantin Lisenkov	Russia	2:33.87	Q
4	2	Evan Ryan Austin	United States	2:40.05	
4	7	Zack McAllister	Canada	2:40.05	
6	6	Alejandro Sanchez Palomero	Spain	2:43.95	

=== Final ===
Competed at 17:30.

Rank	Lane	Name	Nationality	Time	Notes
1st place, gold medalist(s)	5	Oliver Hynd	Great Britain	2:24.63	EU
2nd place, silver medalist(s)	6	Wang Jiachao	China	2:26.62	
3rd place, bronze medalist(s)	4	Maurice Deelen	Netherlands	2:27.17	
4	3	Sam Hynd	Great Britain	2:28.03	
5	2	Charles Rozoy	France	2:28.27	
6	7	Konstantin Lisenkov	Russia	2:28.68	
7	8	Blake Cochrane	Australia	2:33.66	
8	1	Ferenc Csuri	Hungary	2:34.06	

Q = qualified for final. EU = European Record.
