= Swimming at the 2012 Summer Paralympics – Men's 100 metre backstroke S8 =

Event at the 2012 Summer Paralympics

Men's 100m Backstroke S8 at the XIV Paralympic Games
- Venue: London Aquatics Centre
- Dates: 4 September 2012
- Competitors: 12 from 7 nations
- Winning time: 1:05.43

Medalists
1st place, gold medalist(s)		Konstantin Lisenkov	Russia
2nd place, silver medalist(s)		Denis Tarasov	Russia
3rd place, bronze medalist(s)		Oliver Hynd	Great Britain

The men's 100m backstroke S8 event at the 2012 Summer Paralympics took place at the London Aquatics Centre on 4 September. There were two heats; the swimmers with the eight fastest times advanced to the final.

== Results ==
=== Heats ===
Competed from 09:30.

==== Heat 1 ====
Rank	Lane	Name	Nationality	Time	Notes
1	4	Thomas Young	Great Britain	1:09.54	Q
2	5	Sean Fraser	Great Britain	1:10.02	Q
3	2	Niels Korfitz Mortensen	Denmark	1:11.56	Q
4	6	Alexey Fomenkov	Russia	1:12.44	
5	3	Yang Xiusen	China	1:13.75	
6	7	Rudy Garcia-Tolson	United States	1:17.58	

==== Heat 2 ====
Rank	Lane	Name	Nationality	Time	Notes
1	4	Konstantin Lisenkov	Russia	1:07.20	Q
2	5	Denis Tarasov	Russia	1:07.90	Q
3	3	Oliver Hynd	Great Britain	1:08.59	Q
4	2	Ander Romarate Aguirre	Spain	1:12.00	Q
5	6	Mikkel Asmussen	Denmark	1:12.09	Q
6	7	Caio Oliveira	Brazil	1:16.72	

=== Final ===
Competed at 17:30.

Rank	Lane	Name	Nationality	Time	Notes
1st place, gold medalist(s)	4	Konstantin Lisenkov	Russia	1:05.43	PR
2nd place, silver medalist(s)	5	Denis Tarasov	Russia	1:06.93	
3rd place, bronze medalist(s)	3	Oliver Hynd	Great Britain	1:08.35	
4	6	Thomas Young	Great Britain	1:08.91	
5	2	Sean Fraser	Great Britain	1:09.67	
6	7	Niels Korfitz Mortensen	Denmark	1:10.63	
7	1	Ander Romarate Aguirre	Spain	1:12.01	
8	8	Mikkel Asmussen	Denmark	1:12.44	

Q = qualified for final. PR = Paralympic Record.
