= Thomas Young (swimmer) =

British Paralympic swimmer (born 1991)

Personal information
- National team: United Kingdom
- Born: 3 May 1991 (age 35) Lancaster, England
- Height: 1.95 m (6 ft 5 in)

Sport
- Sport: Swimming
- Strokes: Freestyle, butterfly, medley, backstroke
- Classifications: S8, SB7, SM8
- Club: Portsmouth Northsea
Medal record
Men's paralympic swimming
Representing Great Britain
IPC World Championships
Gold medal – first place	2010 Eindhoven	400m freestyle S8
Bronze medal – third place	2010 Eindhoven	100m backstroke S8
Bronze medal – third place	2010 Eindhoven	200m medley SM8
IPC World Championships 25m
Silver medal – second place	2009 Rio de Janeiro	100m backstroke S8
Bronze medal – third place	2009 Rio de Janeiro	100m breaststroke SB7
IPC European Championships
Silver medal – second place	2009 Reykjavik	100 m backstroke S8
Silver medal – second place	2009 Reykjavik	4x100m medley relay 34pts
Bronze medal – third place	2009 Reykjavik	200 m ind. medley – SM8

Thomas Young (born 3 May 1991) is a British Paralympic swimmer. He represented Britain at the 2012 London Paralympics and has won medals at both the long course and short course World Championships.

== Personal history ==
Young was born in Lancaster, England in 1991. He was born without a right hand and forearm and two club feet.

== Swimming career ==
Young was introduced to swimming at the age of five by his mother, who wanted him to be able to swim as he became older. He began competing at the age of 12 and was subsequently classified as a S8 disability swimmer. In 2008 Young attempted to qualify for the British team for the 2008 Summer Paralympics in Beijing, but missed out on a place in the 400m freestyle event by 0.3 seconds. In 2009 he first represented Great Britain at a major international tournament, the IPC Swimming European Championships in Reykjavik. Young reached the finals of six events in Iceland. On the first day of the Championships he finished in second place behind Russia's Konstantin Lisenkov in the 100m backstroke S8, winning his first major medal. He came fourth in the 400m freestyle S8, eighth in the 50m freestyle S8 and was disqualified in the 100m breaststroke - SB7. A second silver medal was won in the men's 4 × 100 m medley relay, where he took the first leg the race. In his final event, the 200m individual medley SM8, he swam 2:34.34 to just edge out Spain's Alejandro Sánchez Palomero to take third place and take his second medal of the tournament.

Later in 2009 Young travelled to Rio de Janeiro to take part in the IPC Swimming World Championships - short course. There he won two further international medals, the silver in his favoured 100m backstroke S8 and bronze in the 100m breaststroke SB7. The next year he travelled to Eindhoven with the British team to participate in the 2010 IPC Swimming World Championships. This would be Young's most impressive international tournament, winning three medals including a gold in the 400m Freestyle S8. His other two medals were both bronze, won in the 100m backstroke S8 and the 200m Individual Medley SM8. In 2011 he attended his second European Championship, this time in Berlin. There he won a gold and a bronze.

In 2012 Young was selected for the Great Britain team to compete at the 2012 Summer Paralympics in London. He had high hopes going into the games and expected podium finishes in some of his seven events. He qualified for the finals in all his events bar the 200m individual medley SM8. Young finished 6th in the 100m freestyle S8 and 7th in the 50m freestyle S8. Despite qualifying in 1st place in the heats, the British team finished 5th in the 4 × 100m freestyle relay 34pts. Young was also fifth in the 100 m breaststroke SB7. In his stronger events, the 400 metre freestyle S8 and the 100 metre backstroke S8 he finished fourth in both; beaten by fellow team-mates Sam Hynd and Oliver Hynd to the bronze medal places.
