= Ismael García Moreno =

Spanish wheelchair basketball player

Ismael García
Personal information
- Full name: Ismael García Moreno
- Nationality: Spanish
- Born: 27 April 1975 (age 51) Canary Islands, Spain

Sport
- Country: Spain
- Sport: Wheelchair basketball

Ismael García Moreno (born 27 April 1975) is a Spanish wheelchair basketball player. He represented Spain at the 2012 Summer Paralympics as a member of Spain men's national team.

== Personal ==
García was born on 27 April 1975 in the Canary Islands. In 2012, he lived in Madrid. In November 2013, he participated in a program run by the Programa ADOP Empleo to train Paralympic athletes in developing business communication and entrepreneurship skills.

== Wheelchair basketball ==
García is a power forward, and 4 point player.

=== National team ===
García was part of the team that competed at the 2009 European Championships. He was one of the major factors in keeping Spain competitive against Germany during the competition, finishing the game as the team's second leading scorer. His selection to represent Spain at the 2011 European Championships was made in March.

García competed in wheelchair basketball at the 2012 Summer Paralympics in London. It was the first time the Spanish national team had qualified for the Paralympics in 16 years. In London, he was coached by Oscar Trigo. His team finished fifth overall. He played in the opening game against Italy, which his team won. When Rafael Muino Gamez broke his wheel in the game against Italy, Garcia brought him a replacement wheel. In London, he made one 3 pointer. He was a member of the national team at the 2013 European Championships. His team finished with a bronze medal after defeating Sweden.

=== Club ===
In 2009, García played for Sandra Gran Canaria. In 2011, he played for Las Palmas de Gran Canaria BSR. In 2013, he played club wheelchair basketball in Spain for Fundación Grupo Norte. On the way to an away game against Amiab, the team's transport broke 40 km from the game. His team lost the game despite leading the game for the first three quarters. He scored 9 points in the game. He also played for BSR Ace Gran Canaria.
