= Roberto Mena Pérez =

Spanish wheelchair basketball player

Roberto Mena
Personal information
- Full name: Roberto Mena Pérez
- Nationality: Spanish
- Born: 6 March 1984 (age 42) Balearic Islands, Spain

Sport
- Country: Spain
- Sport: Wheelchair basketball

Roberto Mena Pérez (born 6 March 1984) is a Spanish wheelchair basketball player. He represented Spain at the 2012 Summer Paralympics as a member of Spain men's national team.

== Personal ==
Mena was born on 6 March 1984 in the Balearic Islands. In 2011 and 2012, he resided in the Canary Islands. When he was 14 years old, he was involved in an accident that resulted in his right leg being amputated.

== Wheelchair basketball ==
Mena worked to create a wheelchair basketball program in the Canary Islands that encouraged greater social integration between people with and without disabilities in the area. As part of the program, children with and without disabilities regularly play wheelchair basketball together.

=== National team ===
Mena was invited to a 2012 national team training camp in early 2012 that was part of the selection process for the 2012 Games, arriving in Madrid for the camp by train. He competed in wheelchair basketball at the 2012 Summer Paralympics in London. It was the first time the Spanish national team had qualified for the Paralympics in 16 years. In London, he was coached by Oscar Trigo. His team finished fifth overall. He played in the game against Turkey. Mena was a member of the national team at the Frankfurt, Germany hosted 2013 European Championships. His team finished with a bronze medal after defeating Sweden.

=== Club ===
In 2011, Mena played for BSR Las Palmas de Gran Canaria. During the 2012/2013 season, he played club wheelchair basketball in Spain for Fundación Grupo Norte. He left the team after that season after breaking his contract, which still had a year left on it. During the 2013/2014 season, he played for Amiab. On the way to an away game that season, the team's transport broke 40 km from the game. His team lost the game despite leading the game for the first three quarters. He finished the game with 23 points. During a game against Amfiv that his team won 80-59 and which he started, he scored 17 points. He played in the last game for the team of the 2013 calendar year when they played against his former team, Grupo Norte.
