= Swimming at the 2012 Summer Paralympics – Men's 100 metre breaststroke SB7 =

Event at the 2012 Summer Paralympics

Men's 100m Breaststroke SB7 at the XIV Paralympic Games
- Venue: London Aquatics Centre
- Dates: 1 September 2012
- Competitors: 13 from 11 nations
- Winning time: 1:18.77

Medalists
1st place, gold medalist(s)		Blake Cochrane	Australia
2nd place, silver medalist(s)		Tomotaro Nakamura	Japan
3rd place, bronze medalist(s)		Matthew Levy	Australia

The men's 100m breaststroke SB7 event at the 2012 Summer Paralympics took place at the London Aquatics Centre on 1 September. There were two heats; the swimmers with the eight fastest times advanced to the final.

== Results ==
=== Heats ===
Competed from 11:42.

==== Heat 1 ====
Rank	Lane	Name	Nationality	Time	Notes
1	4	Tomotaro Nakamura	Japan	1:22.45	Q
2	5	Matthew Levy	Australia	1:23.09	Q
3	6	Iaroslav Semenenko	Ukraine	1:26.34	Q
4	2	Viktor Kemeny	Slovakia	1:26.58	Q
5	7	Ander Romarate Aguirre	Spain	1:31.84	
	3	Chen Jianfeng	China	DNS	

==== Heat 2 ====
Rank	Lane	Name	Nationality	Time	Notes
1	4	Blake Cochrane	Australia	1:20.76	Q, PR
2	5	Sascha Kindred	Great Britain	1:23.59	Q
3	3	Thomas Young	Great Britain	1:24.90	Q
4	6	Evan Ryan Austin	United States	1:27.02	Q
5	2	Tobias Pollap	Germany	1:27.04	
6	7	Mikkel Asmussen	Denmark	1:30.37	
	1	Antonio Sanchez Francisco	Andorra	DSQ	

=== Final ===
Competed at 20:20.

Rank	Lane	Name	Nationality	Time	Notes
1st place, gold medalist(s)	4	Blake Cochrane	Australia	1:18.77	WR
2nd place, silver medalist(s)	5	Tomotaro Nakamura	Japan	1:22.04	
3rd place, bronze medalist(s)	3	Matthew Levy	Australia	1:22.62	
4	6	Sascha Kindred	Great Britain	1:23.53	
5	2	Thomas Young	Great Britain	1:23.69	
6	8	Evan Ryan Austin	United States	1:25.74	
7	1	Viktor Kemeny	Slovakia	1:26.24	
8	7	Iaroslav Semenenko	Ukraine	1:26.76	

'Q = qualified for final. WR = World Record. PR = Paralympic Record. DSQ = Disqualified. DNS = Did not start.
