= Daniel Rodríguez (basketball) =

Spanish wheelchair basketball player (born 1976)

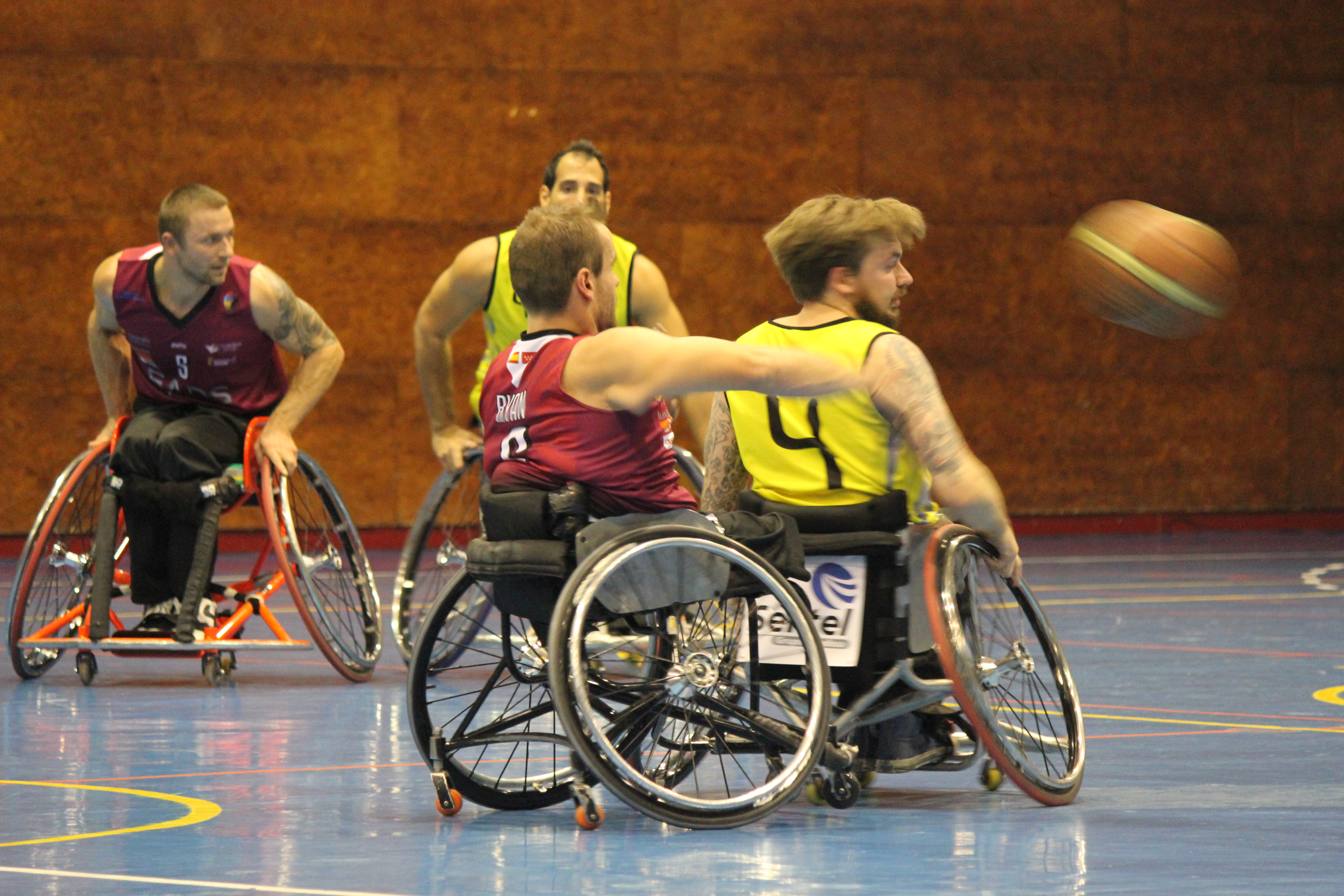
- Rodriguez (4) playing for ONCE in 2013

Personal information
- Full name: Daniel Rodríguez Martín
- Nationality: Spanish
- Born: 30 June 1976 (age 50) Andalusia, Spain

Sport
- Country: Spain
- Sport: Wheelchair basketball

Daniel Rodríguez Martín (born 30 June 1976) is a Spanish wheelchair basketball player. He represented Spain at the 2012 Summer Paralympics as a member of Spain men's national wheelchair basketball team.

== Personal ==
Rodríguez was born on 12 September 1984 in Andalusia and continued to reside there in 2012. He has a mild physical disability. As a teenager, he participated in athletics, competing in the high jump and sprints. When he turned 18 and until he was 26 years old, he played rugby union for Ranas Rugby Club in Spain's second division. In January 2003, he was in a motor vehicle accident that resulted in paraplegia. While going through rehabilitation, he tried three sports, table tennis, swimming and wheelchair basketball. At the 2013 Benalmádena Grand Gala Sports, he was given a special award for perseverance and dedication.

Rodríguez has made several music videos, and has done work for Antena 3.

== Wheelchair basketball ==
Rodríguez is a 1 point player, playing as a guard. He took up the sport when he was 27 years old, following a motor vehicle accident. He was recruited while at the hospital by Spain national team player, Paul Martín.

=== National team ===
Rodríguez first represented Spain at the national level during the 2005 European Championship campaign, where the team finished seventh. He competed again at the European Championships in 2007 where his team finished sixth. In 2009, he finished seventh at the European Championships. His selection to represent Spain at the 2011 European Championships was made in March. Rodríguez competed in wheelchair basketball at the 2012 Summer Paralympics in London. It was the debut the Spain national team had qualified for the Paralympics in 16 years. In London, he was coached by Oscar Trigo. His team finished fifth overall. He played in the game against Turkey. He scored 5 points in the team's 67–40 victory of Italy. In November 2013, Rodríguez was awarded a €4,000 scholarship from the Madrid Olympic Foundation to support his efforts to qualify for the 2016 Summer Paralympics.

=== Club ===
His first club team was the BSR Valladolid, which Rodríguez started training with in September 2003. He was one of three players who joined the club at that time, José Luis Robles and Juanjo Alonso being the other two. He played for them during the 2004/2004 season and the 2005/2006 season. For the 2006/2007 season, he played for Murcia team, Fundación Polaris World BSR where they finished second in the league. He played for the team again in 2007/2008 season, where they finished lower on the ladder.

Rodríguez joined CD Fundosa Once for the 2008/2009 season. He has played for them since, where he has won two league championships. Playing for the team, he wears number 4. In a 2011 game against Getafe that his team won 87–82, he scored 19 points. In a November 2013 game against Mideba Extremadura, he scored 0 points in an 80–57 victory for his team.
