= Jesús Romero Martín =

Spanish wheelchair basketball player

Jesús Romero
Personal information
- Full name: Jesús María Romero Martín
- Nationality: Spanish
- Born: 12 September 1984 (age 41) Málaga, Andalusia, Spain

Sport
- Country: Spain
- Sport: Wheelchair basketball

Jesús María Romero Martín (born 12 September 1984) is a Spanish wheelchair basketball player. He represented Spain at the 2012 Summer Paralympics as a member of Spain men's national team.

== Personal ==
Romero was born on 12 September 1984 in Andalucia and continued to reside there in 2012.

== Wheelchair basketball ==
Romero is a center.

=== National team ===
His selection to represent Spain at the 2011 European Championships was made in March. Romero competed in wheelchair basketball at the 2012 Summer Paralympics in London. It was the first time the Spain national team had qualified for the Paralympics in 16 years. His team arrived in England by 18 August to prepare for the Games. In London, he was coached by Oscar Trigo. His team finished fifth overall. He was one of four Spanish competitors from the Andalusia region of Spain to compete on 1 September. He scored 0 points in the team's 67–40 victory of Italy. Romero was a member of the national team at the 2013 European Championships, which were held in Israel. His team finished with a bronze medal after defeating Sweden. Following the competition, the mayor of Vélez-Málaga, Francisco Delgado Bonilla, held a reception honouring him and three of Spain's triathletes.

=== Club ===
Romero played for Clínicas Rincón Amivel during the 2011/2012 and 2012/2013 seasons in Spain's top division. He played club basketball for Clínica Rincón Amive during the 2013/2014 season. In November, his team was in fifth place in the league. He played in the team's game against Fundación Grupo Norte.
