= Swimming at the 2012 Summer Paralympics – Men's 400 metre freestyle S8 =

Event at the 2012 Summer Paralympics

Men's 400 metre freestyle S8 at the XIV Paralympic Games
- Venue: London Aquatics Centre
- Dates: 31 August 2012
- Competitors: 12 from 8 nations

Medalists
1st place, gold medalist(s)		Yinan Wang	China
2nd place, silver medalist(s)		Oliver Hynd	Great Britain
3rd place, bronze medalist(s)		Sam Hynd	Great Britain

The men's 400 metre freestyle S8 event at the 2012 Paralympic Games took place on 31 August, at the London Aquatics Centre in the Olympic Park, London. The event was for athletes included in the S8 classification, which is for competitors with physical impairments. Twelve swimmers took part, representing eight nations. China's Yinan Wang won the gold medal with British brothers Oliver and Sam Hynd taking silver and bronze respectively.

== Results ==
Key

- Q Qualified for next round
- AS = Asian record
- AM = America's record

=== Heats ===
Two heats were held, each with six swimmers; the swimmers with the eight fastest times advanced to the final. The heats took place on 31 August starting at 9:30 BST.

==== Heat 1 ====
Rank	Lane	Name	Nationality	Time	Notes
1	4	Sam Hynd	Great Britain	4:33.25	Q
2	5	Yinan Wang	China	4:37.86	Q
3	3	Christoph Burkard	Germany	4:45.40	Q
4	6	Jonathan Mcgrath	Ireland	4:53.25	
5	2	Torben Schmidtke	Germany	5:01.05	
6	7	Ferenc Csuri	Hungary	5:13.88	

==== Heat 2 ====
Rank	Lane	Name	Nationality	Time	Notes
1	5	Thomas Young	Great Britain	4:34.16	Q
2	4	Oliver Hynd	Great Britain	4:36.40	Q
3	6	Caio Oliveira	Brazil	4:41.20	Q, AM
4	2	Zack McAllister	Canada	4:43.80	Q
5	3	Jiachao Wang	China	4:37.34	Q
6	7	Rudy Garcia-Tolson	United States	4:54.84	

=== Final ===
China's Yinan Wang won the gold medal in a time of four minutes 27.11 seconds, setting a new Asian record.

Rank	Lane	Name	Nationality	Time	Notes
1st place, gold medalist(s)	6	Yinan Wang	China	4:27.11	AS
2nd place, silver medalist(s)	3	Oliver Hynd	Great Britain	4:27.88	
3rd place, bronze medalist(s)	4	Sam Hynd	Great Britain	4:32.93	
4	5	Thomas Young	Great Britain	4:33.57	
5	8	Jiachao Wang	China	4:39.08	
6	7	Zack McAllister	Canada	4:39.81	AM
7	1	Caio Oliveira	Brazil	4:39.86	
8	8	Christoph Burkard	Germany	4:44.23	
