= Swimming at the 2012 Summer Paralympics – Men's 4 × 100 metre freestyle relay 34pts =

Event at the 2012 Summer Paralympics

Men's 4x100m Freestyle Relay 34 points at the XIV Paralympic Games
- Venue: London Aquatics Centre
- Dates: 2 September 2012
- Competitors: 9
- Winning time: 3:50.17

Medalists
1st place, gold medalist(s)		Australia (AUS); Andrew Pasterfield, Matthew Levy, Blake Cochrane, Matthew Cowdrey
2nd place, silver medalist(s)		China (CHN); Song Maodang, Wang Jiachao, Lin Furong, Wang Yinan
3rd place, bronze medalist(s)		Russia (RUS); Konstantin Lisenkov, Evgeny Zimin, Denis Tarasov, Dmitry Grigoryev

The men's 4 × 100 m freestyle relay 34 points event at the 2012 Summer Paralympics took place at the London Aquatics Centre on 2 September. There were two heats; the teams with the eight fastest times advanced to the final.

== Results ==
=== Heats ===
Competed from 11:40.

==== Heat 1 ====
Rank	Lane	Nation	Swimmers	Time	Notes
1	4	Brazil	Daniel Dias; André Brasil; Phelipe Andrews Melo Rodrigues; Caio Oliveira	4:00.12	Q
2	3	China	Song Maodang; Wang Jiachao; Lin Furong; Wang Yinan	4:01.05	Q, 0.93
3	6	United States	Lantz Lamback; Evan Ryan Austin; Ian Jaryd Silverman; Michael Prout	4:01.35	Q, 1.23
4	5	Ukraine	Iurii Martynov; Andriy Sirovatchenko; Oleksandr Komarov; Andriy Kalyna	4:03.63	Q, 3.51

==== Heat 2 ====
Rank	Lane	Nation	Swimmers	Time	Notes
1	5	Great Britain	Sean Fraser; Thomas Young; Sam Hynd; Robert Welbourn	3:57.87	Q
2	3	Russia	Andrey Gladkov; Pavel Poltavtsev; Eduard Samarin; Denis Tarasov	4:00.30	Q, 2.43
3	4	Australia	Brenden Hall; Michael Auprince; Michael Anderson; Matthew Haanappel	4:00.91	Q, 3.04
4	6	Spain	Sebastián Rodríguez; Jose Antonio Mari Alcaraz; Jesus Collado; David Levecq	4:07.70	Q, 9.83
5	2	Germany	Sebastian Iwanow; Lucas Ludwig; Martin Schulz; Christoph Burkard	4:08.03	10.16

=== Final ===
Competed at 20:25.

Rank	Lane	Nation	Swimmers	Time	Notes
1st place, gold medalist(s)	6	Australia	Andrew Pasterfield; Matthew Levy; Blake Cochrane; Matthew Cowdrey	3:50.17	PR
2nd place, silver medalist(s)	2	China	Song Maodang; Wang Jiachao; Lin Furong; Wang Yinan	3:51.68	AS
3rd place, bronze medalist(s)	3	Russia	Konstantin Lisenkov; Evgeny Zimin; Denis Tarasov; Dmitry Grigoryev	3:52.93	
4	5	Brazil	Daniel Dias; André Brasil; Phelipe Andrews Melo Rodrigues; Caio Oliveira	3:55.63	
5	4	Great Britain	Sean Fraser; Thomas Young; Sam Hynd; Robert Welbourn	3:56.38	
6	7	United States	Lantz Lamback; Evan Ryan Austin; Ian Jaryd Silverman; Michael Prout	3:59.16	
7	1	Ukraine	Iurii Martynov; Andriy Sirovatchenko; Andriy Kalyna; Yevheniy Bohodayko	3:59.17	
8	8	Spain	Jose Antonio Mari Alcaraz; Sebastián Rodríguez; Jesus Collado; David Levecq	4:05.49	

Q = qualified for final. PR = Paralympic Record. AS = Asian Record.
