= Swimming at the 2008 Summer Paralympics – Men's 200 metre individual medley SM8 =

Men's 200m Individual Medley SM8 at the XIII Paralympic Games
- Venue: Beijing National Aquatics Center
- Dates: 11 September
- Competitors: 13 from 9 nations
- Winning time: 2:20.92

Medalists
1st place, gold medalist(s)		Peter Leek	Australia
2nd place, silver medalist(s)		Wang Jiachao	China
3rd place, bronze medalist(s)		Sam Hynd	Great Britain

The men's 200m individual medley SM8 event at the 2008 Summer Paralympics took place at the Beijing National Aquatics Center on 11 September. There were two heats; the swimmers with the eight fastest times advanced to the final.

== Results ==
=== Heats ===
Competed from 09:52.

==== Heat 1 ====
Rank	Name	Nationality	Time	Notes
1	Peter Leek	Australia	2:25.72	Q, PR
2	Wang Jiachao	China	2:32.03	Q
3	Drew Christensen	Canada	2:37.86	Q
4	Matt Levy	Australia	2:39.40	Q
5	Alejandro Sanchez	Spain	2:40.23	Q
6	Nikolai Willig	Germany	2:40.24	

==== Heat 2 ====
Rank	Name	Nationality	Time	Notes
1	Sam Hynd	Great Britain	2:31.96	Q
2	Tian Hengheng	China	2:39.26	Q
3	Mihovil Spanja	Croatia	2:39.55	Q
4	Ferenc Csuri	Hungary	2:40.46	
5	Christoph Burkard	Germany	2:43.19	
6	Igor Erokhin	Russia	2:50.88	
	Wang Xiaofu	China		DQ

=== Final ===
Competed at 17:48.

Rank	Name	Nationality	Time	Notes
1st place, gold medalist(s)	Peter Leek	Australia	2:20.92	WR
2nd place, silver medalist(s)	Wang Jiachao	China	2:29.71	
3rd place, bronze medalist(s)	Sam Hynd	Great Britain	2:29.93	
4	Alejandro Sanchez	Spain	2:36.66	
5	Drew Christensen	Canada	2:36.67	
6	Mihovil Spanja	Croatia	2:37.77	
7	Matt Levy	Australia	2:38.35	
	Tian Hengheng	China		DQ

Q = qualified for final. WR = World Record. PR = Paralympic Record. DQ = Disqualified.
