= Francisco Sánchez Lara =

Spanish wheelchair basketball player

Francisco Sánchez
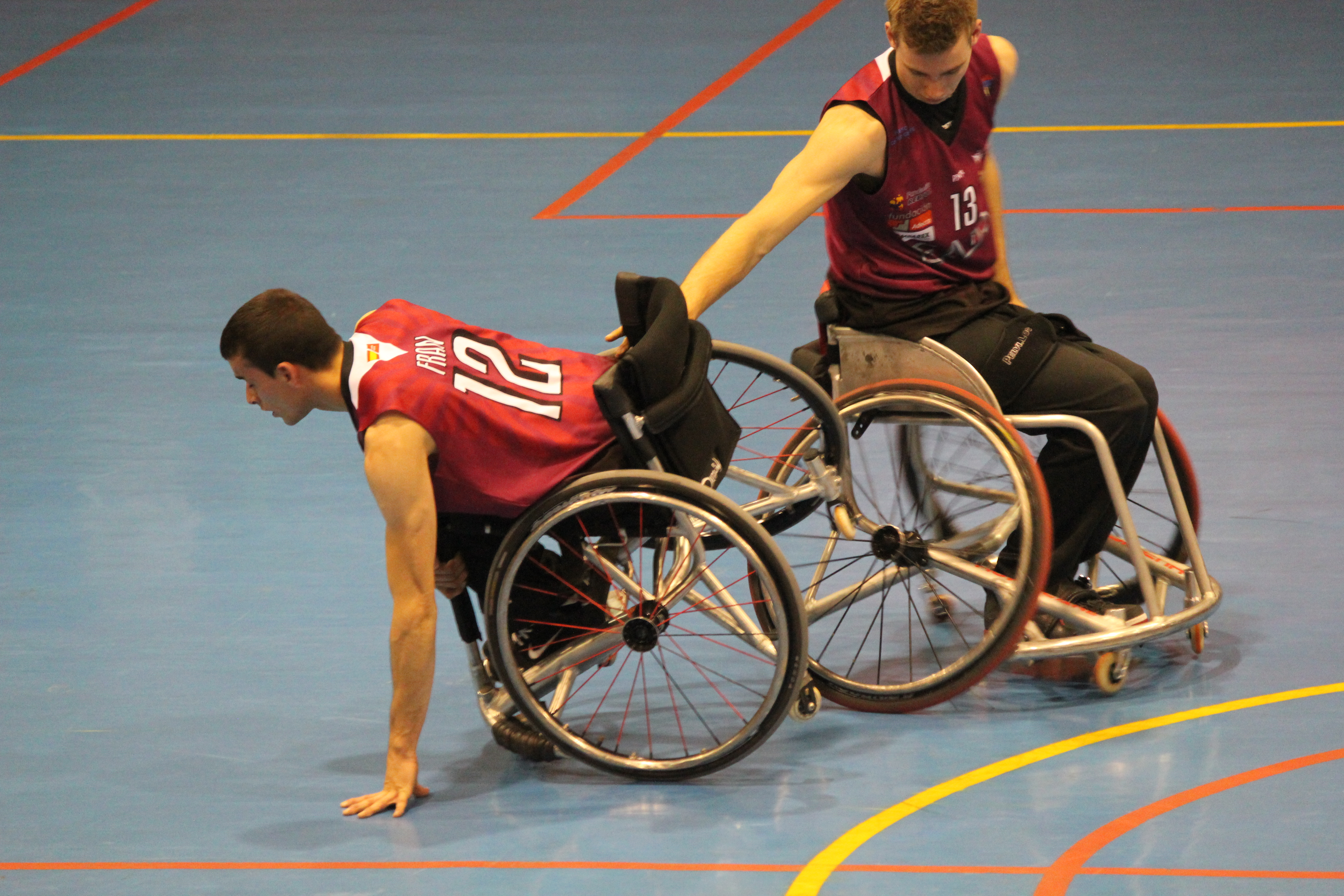
- Sánchez (12) getting assistance getting back in his wheelchair during a 2013 game

Personal information
- Full name: Francisco Javier Sánchez Lara
- Nationality: Spanish
- Born: 11 August 1989 (age 36) Bolanos de Calatrava, Castilla–La Mancha, Spain

Sport
- Country: Spain
- Sport: Wheelchair basketball

Francisco Javier Sánchez Lara (born 11 August 1989) is a Spanish wheelchair basketball player. He represented Spain at the 2012 Summer Paralympics as a member of Spain men's national team.

== Personal ==
Sánchez was born on 11 August 1989 in Bolanos de Calatrava, Castilla–La Mancha, and continued to reside there in 2012. In 2012, he had a sports scholarship from the Castilla-La Mancha Olímpica (CLAMO) program run by the regional government.

== Wheelchair basketball ==
Sánchez is a guard, and a 1 point player.

=== National team ===
Sánchez was selected for the national team's Paralympic campaign by Oscar Trigo in 2011. His selection to represent Spain at the 2011 European Championships was made in March. The championship was held in Turkey. He was one of 25 players to participate in a January 2012 team training camp. He was chosen for the 2012 team ahead of Jonatan Soria and José Luis Robles.

Sánchez competed in wheelchair basketball at the 2012 Summer Paralympics in London. It was the first time the Spanish national team had qualified for the Paralympics in 16 years. In London, he was coached by Oscar Trigo. His team finished fifth overall. Following the Games, he was congratulated by Castilian-La Mancha's Minister of Education, Culture and Sports, Martial Marin.

Sánchez was a member of the national team at the 2013 European Championships. His team finished with a bronze medal after defeating Sweden.

=== Club ===
In 2009, Sánchez played for Fuhnpaiin-Peraleda de Toledo. In 2010 and 2011, he played for Fundación Grupo Norte. He played a key role in guiding the team to a league title in the 2010/2011 season and in assisting the team in being runners up in the Copa del Rey. During the 2011/2012 season, he played for CID Casa Murcia Getafe. In 2013, he played club wheelchair basketball for Padova Millenium.
