= Rafael Muiño =

Spanish wheelchair basketball player

Rafael Muino Gamez
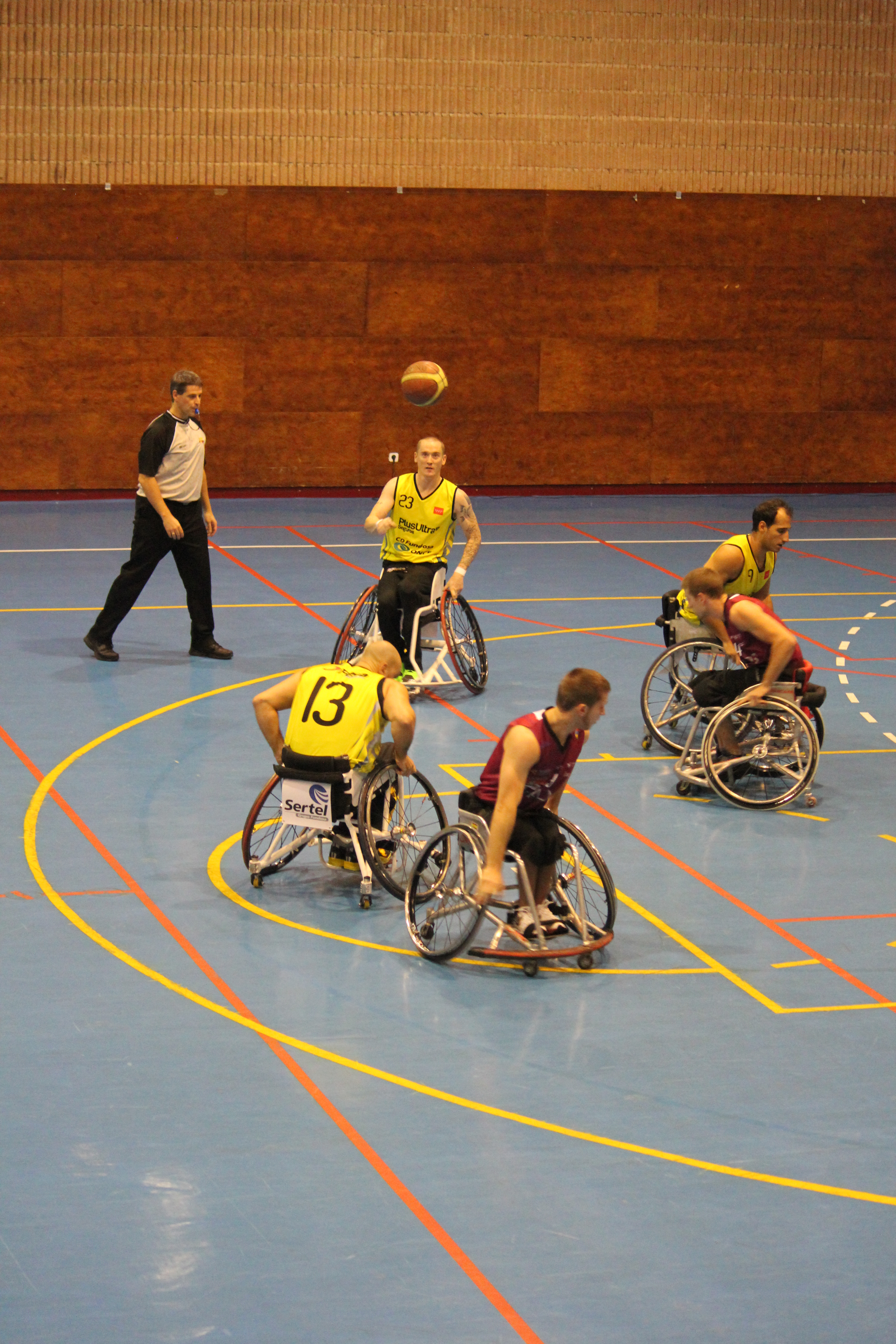
- Muino (13) for ONCE in a 2013 game against Getafe

Personal information
- Nationality: Spanish
- Born: 11 July 1975 (age 50)

Sport
- Country: Spain
- Sport: Wheelchair basketball

Rafael Muino Gamez (born 11 July 1975) is a Spanish wheelchair basketball player. He represented Spain at the 2012 Summer Paralympics as a member of Spain national team.

== Personal ==
Muiño was born in San Cristóbal de la Laguna, Tenerife on 11 July 1975. In 2013, he lived in Toledo.

== Wheelchair basketball ==
Muiño is a 2 point player, and guard. Playing for the national team, he wears the number 1 shirt.

=== National team ===
Muiño was part of the team that competed at the 2009 European Championships. He was one of the major factors in keeping Spain competitive against Germany during the competition. His team finished third. His selection to represent Spain at the 2011 European Championships was made in March.

Muiño competed in wheelchair basketball at the 2012 Summer Paralympics in London. It was the first time the Spain national team had qualified for the Paralympics in 16 years. In London, he was coached by Oscar Trigo. His team finished fifth overall. He played in the team's game against Italy. He broke a tire in the game against Italy. He scored 15 points in the game against the United States. In London, he made two 3 pointers. At the end of the tournament, he averaged 32:53 minutes per game, 8.1 points per game, 3.9 rebounds per game, and 4.6 assists per game. He had a free throw percentage of 51%, 2 point field goal percentage of 42% and 3 point field goal percentage of 40%. At the end of the London Games, he had 58 international appearances.

=== Club ===
In 2009, 2011, 2012 and 2013, Muiño played for CD Fundosa-ONCE. In a 2011 game against Getafe that his team won 87–82, he scored six points. In a November 2013 game against Mideba Extremadura, he scored 9 points in an 80–57 victory for his team.
