= Swimming at the 2020 Summer Paralympics – Men's 200 metre individual medley SM8 =

Men's 200 metre individual medley SM8 at the XVI Paralympic Games
- Venue: Tokyo Aquatics Centre
- Dates: 28 August 2021
- Competitors: 12 from 10 nations

Medalists
1st place, gold medalist(s)		Denys Dubrov	Ukraine
2nd place, silver medalist(s)		Xu Haijiao	China
3rd place, bronze medalist(s)		Yang Guanglong	China

The men's 200 metre individual medley SM8 event at the 2020 Paralympic Games took place on 28 August 2021, at the Tokyo Aquatics Centre.

== Heats ==
The swimmers with the top eight times, regardless of heat, advanced to the final.

Rank	Heat	Lane	Name	Nationality	Time	Notes
1	2	4	Denys Dubrov	Ukraine	2:25.40	Q
2	2	5	Robert Griswold	United States	2:26.48	Q
3	1	3	Dimosthenis Michalentzakis	Greece	2:28.58	Q
4	2	3	Jesse Aungles	Australia	2:28.75	Q
5	1	4	Xu Haijiao	China	2:29.01	Q
6	2	7	Liu Fengqi	China	2:29.40	Q
7	1	5	Yang Guanglong	China	2:29.90	Q
8	1	2	Diogo Cancela	Portugal	2:30.08	Q
9	1	6	Andreas Onea	Austria	2:31.03	
10	2	2	Luis Armando Andrade Guillen	Mexico	2:31.60	
11	1	7	Kotaro Ogiwara	Japan	2:31.72	
12	2	6	Carlos Fernández	Spain	2:31.93	

== Final ==
200m individual medley final
Rank	Lane	Name	Nationality	Time	Notes
1st place, gold medalist(s)	4	Denys Dubrov	Ukraine	2:20.96	
2nd place, silver medalist(s)	2	Xu Haijiao	China	2:21.06	
3rd place, bronze medalist(s)	1	Yang Guanglong	China	2:21.53	
4	5	Robert Griswold	United States	2:24.97	
5	7	Liu Fengqi	China	2:26.94	
6	3	Dimosthenis Michalentzakis	Greece	2:27.57	
7	6	Jesse Aungles	Australia	2:29.48	
8	8	Diogo Cancela	Portugal	2:33.36	
