= Swimming at the 2016 Summer Paralympics – Men's 100 metre butterfly =

The men's 100 metre butterfly swimming events for the 2016 Summer Paralympics took place at the Olympic Aquatics Stadium from 8 to 17 September. A total of eleven events were contested for different classifications.

== Competition format ==
Each event consisted of two rounds: heats and final. The top eight swimmers overall in the heats progressed to the final. If there were less than eight swimmers in an event, no heats were held and all swimmers qualify for the final.

== Results ==
=== S8 ===
20:15 9 September 2016:

Rank	Lane	Name	Nationality	Time	Notes
1st place, gold medalist(s)	6	Maodang Song	China	59.19	WR
2nd place, silver medalist(s)	4	Haijiao Xu	China	1:00.08	
3rd place, bronze medalist(s)	5	Guanglong Yang	China	1:01.18	
4	3	Charles Rozoy	France	1:01.40	
5	2	Luis Armando Andrade Guillen	Mexico	1:03.30	
6	7	Andreas Onea	Austria	1:05.23	
7	1	Jesse Aungles	Australia	1:06.60	
8	8	Evan Austin	United States	1:07.75	

=== S9 ===
17:30 15 September 2016:

Rank	Lane	Name	Nationality	Time	Notes
1st place, gold medalist(s)	3	Dimosthenis Michalentzakis	Greece	59.27	PR
2nd place, silver medalist(s)	5	Federico Morlacchi	Italy	59.52	
3rd place, bronze medalist(s)	4	Tamás Sors	Hungary	59.85	
4	7	Brenden Hall	Australia	1:01.85	
5	2	Juan Castillo Estevez	Cuba	1:01.93	
6	6	Kristijan Vincetic	Croatia	1:02.50	
7	1	Marco Pulleiro	Argentina	1:03.75	
8	8	Jesse Reynolds	New Zealand	1:04.31	

=== S10 ===
18:36 12 September 2016:

Rank	Lane	Name	Nationality	Time	Notes
1st place, gold medalist(s)	4	Denys Dubrov	Ukraine	54.71	WR
2nd place, silver medalist(s)	5	Maksym Krypak	Ukraine	54.90	
3rd place, bronze medalist(s)	3	André Brasil	Brazil	56.50	
4	7	Alec Elliot	Canada	58.35	
5	2	Nathan Stein	Canada	58.64	
6	6	David Levecq	Spain	59.03	
7	1	Riccardo Menciotti	Italy	59.65	
8	8	Achmat Hassiem	South Africa	1:00.96	

=== S11 ===
18:48 14 September 2016:

Rank	Lane	Name	Nationality	Time	Notes
1st place, gold medalist(s)	3	Israel Oliver	Spain	1:02.24	
2nd place, silver medalist(s)	4	Keiichi Kimura	Japan	1:02.43	
3rd place, bronze medalist(s)	5	Oleksandr Mashchenko	Ukraine	1:03.38	
4	6	Bradley Snyder	United States	1:03.52	
5	2	Chenquan Lou	China	1:06.99	
6	7	Hryhory Zudzilau	Belarus	1:08.64	
7	1	Yunerki Ortega	Cuba	1:12.41	
8	8	Leider Lemus Rojas	Colombia	1:13.87	

=== S13 ===
19:32 8 September 2016:

Rank	Lane	Name	Nationality	Time	Notes
1st place, gold medalist(s)	4	Ihar Boki	Belarus	53.85	WR
2nd place, silver medalist(s)	3	Kirill Pankov	Uzbekistan	56.84	
3rd place, bronze medalist(s)	5	Muzaffar Tursunkhujaev	Uzbekistan	57.26	
4	2	Raman Salei	Azerbaijan	58.11	
5	7	Dzmitry Salei	Azerbaijan	58.16	
6	6	Thomaz Matera	Brazil	58.42	
7	1	Braedan Jason	Australia	1:00.12	
8	8	Tucker Dupree	United States	1:00.76	
