= Swimming at the 2012 Summer Paralympics – Men's 50 metre breaststroke SB3 =

Event at the 2012 Summer Paralympics

Men's 50m Breaststroke SB3 at the XIV Paralympic Games
- Venue: London Aquatics Centre
- Dates: 3 September 2012
- Competitors: 13 from 10 nations
- Winning time: 50.00

Medalists
1st place, gold medalist(s)		Michael Schoenmaker	Netherlands
2nd place, silver medalist(s)		Miguel Luque	Spain
3rd place, bronze medalist(s)		Takayuki Suzuki	Japan

The men's 50m breaststroke SB3 event at the 2012 Summer Paralympics took place at the London Aquatics Centre on 3 September. There were two heats; the swimmers with the eight fastest times advanced to the final.

== Results ==
=== Heats ===
Competed from 11:40.

==== Heat 1 ====
Rank	Lane	Name	Nationality	Time	Notes
1	4	Takayuki Suzuki	Japan	51.38	Q
2	5	Michael Schoenmaker	Netherlands	51.39	Q
3	2	Aleksei Lyzhikhin	Russia	53.05	Q
4	3	Gustavo Sánchez Martínez	Mexico	53.26	Q
5	6	Konstantinos Karaouzas	Greece	55.81	
6	7	Javier Hernandez Aguiran	Spain	58.89	
7	1	Ronystony Cordeiro da Silva	Brazil	1:00.83	

==== Heat 2 ====
Rank	Lane	Name	Nationality	Time	Notes
1	4	Miguel Luque	Spain	50.42	Q
2	6	Ahmed Kelly	Australia	51.86	Q, OC
3	5	Vasilis Tsagkaris	Greece	52.39	Q
4	3	Vicente Gil	Spain	54.49	Q
5	2	Jan Povysil	Czech Republic	57.07	
6	7	Nicolo Bensi	Italy	57.58	

=== Final ===
Competed at 20:20.

Rank	Lane	Name	Nationality	Time	Notes
1st place, gold medalist(s)	3	Michael Schoenmaker	Netherlands	50.00	
2nd place, silver medalist(s)	4	Miguel Luque	Spain	50.18	
3rd place, bronze medalist(s)	5	Takayuki Suzuki	Japan	50.26	
4	6	Ahmed Kelly	Australia	52.54	
5	1	Gustavo Sánchez Martínez	Mexico	52.67	
6	2	Vasilis Tsagkaris	Greece	53.07	
7	7	Aleksei Lyzhikhin	Russia	53.22	
8	8	Vicente Gil	Spain	53.96	

Q = qualified for final. OC = Oceania Record.
