= Diego de Paz =

Spanish wheelchair basketball player

Personal information
- Full name: Diego de Paz Pazo
- Nationality: Spanish
- Born: 25 September 1971 (age 54) Sevilla, Spain

Sport
- Country: Spain
- Sport: Wheelchair basketball

Diego de Paz Pazo (born 25 September 1971) is a Spanish wheelchair basketball player.

== Wheelchair basketball ==
De Paz is 4 point player.

=== National team ===
He played wheelchair basketball at the 1996 Summer Paralympics. His selection to represent Spain at the 2011 European Championships was made in March. He was chosen for the 2012 team ahead of Jonatan Soria and José Luis Robles. He played wheelchair basketball at the 2012 Summer Paralympics. His team was fifth. They beat Germany 67–48 to finish fifth. It was the first time the Spain national team had qualified for the Paralympics in 16 years. In London, he was coached by Oscar Trigo. His team finished fifth overall. He played in the game against South Africa and Germany. He scored 11 points in the game against the United States. In the Paralympics, he ranks 9th in history in the total number of three point shots made at the Games. Following the conclusion of the London Games, he retired from international competition. He cried openly on court following his last game.

=== Club ===
In 2011, he played for Once Andalucía.
