= Swimming at the 2016 Summer Paralympics – Men's 400 metre freestyle S8 =

Men's 400 metre freestyle S8 at the XV Paralympic Games
- Venue: Olympic Aquatics Stadium
- Dates: 8 September 2016
- Competitors: 12 from 8 nations

Medalists
1st place, gold medalist(s)		Oliver Hynd	Great Britain
2nd place, silver medalist(s)		Xu Haijiao	China
3rd place, bronze medalist(s)		Wang Yinan	China

The men's 400 metre freestyle S8 event at the 2016 Paralympic Games took place on 8 September, at the Olympic Aquatics Stadium.

Two heats were held, both with six swimmers. The swimmers with the eight fastest times advanced to the final.

== Records ==
Prior to the competition, the existing World and Paralympic records were as follows.

World record	Oliver Hynd (GBR)	4:23.76	Sheffield, Great Britain	30 July 2016
Paralympic record	Sam Hynd (GBR)	4:26.25	Beijing, China	9 September 2008
2016 World leading	Oliver Hynd (GBR)	4:23.76	Sheffield, Great Britain	30 July 2016

== Heats ==
=== Heat 1 ===
Rank	Lane	Name	Nationality	Time	Notes
1	4	Wang Yinan	China	4:41.10	Q
2	3	Xu Haijiao	China	4:41.18	Q
3	5	Josef Craig	Great Britain	4:41.93	Q
4	6	Bohdan Hrynenko	Ukraine	4:51.81	
5	2	Ernie Gawilan	Philippines	4:54.24	
6	7	Evan Austin	United States	4:56.85	

=== Heat 2 ===
Rank	Lane	Name	Nationality	Time	Notes
1	4	Oliver Hynd	Great Britain	4:31.90	Q
2	3	Robert Griswold	United States	4:38.46	Q
3	5	Caio Oliveira	Brazil	4:40.64	Q
4	6	Blake Cochrane	Australia	4:41.06	Q
5	2	Jesse Aungles	Australia	4:43.87	Q
6	7	Torben Schmidtke	Germany	4:56.29	

== Final ==
Rank	Lane	Name	Nationality	Time	Notes
1st place, gold medalist(s)	4	Oliver Hynd	Great Britain	4:21.89	WR
2nd place, silver medalist(s)	7	Xu Haijiao	China	4:25.65	
3rd place, bronze medalist(s)	2	Wang Yinan	China	4:32.78	
4	3	Caio Oliveria	Brazil	4:33.97	
5	5	Robert Griswold	United States	4:36.26	
6	1	Josef Craig	Great Britain	4:39.04	
7	6	Blake Cochrane	Australia	4:39.79	
8	8	Jesse Aungles	Australia	4:48.23	
