= Swimming at the 2012 Summer Paralympics – Men's 400 metre freestyle S12 =

Event at the 2012 Summer Paralympics

Men's 400m Freestyle S12 at the XIV Paralympic Games
- Venue: London Aquatics Centre
- Dates: 30 August 2012
- Competitors: 11 from 7 nations
- Winning time: 4:10.26

Medalists
1st place, gold medalist(s)		Sergey Punko	Russia
2nd place, silver medalist(s)		Enrique Floriano	Spain
3rd place, bronze medalist(s)		Sergii Klippert	Ukraine

The men's 400 metre freestyle S12 event at the 2012 Paralympic Games took place on 30 August, at the London Aquatics Centre.

Two heats were held, one with five swimmers and the other with six. The swimmers with the eight fastest times advanced to the final.

Sergey Punko won the gold medal in a time of 04:10.26. It was Russia's first gold of the London 2012 Paralympics.

== Heats ==
=== Heat 1 ===
Rank	Lane	Name	Nationality	Time	Notes
1	4	Enrique Floriano	Spain	4:19.38	Q
2	2	Sergii Klippert	Ukraine	4:30.68	Q
3	6	Ignacio Gonzalez	Argentina	4:33.33	Q
4	5	Fabrizio Sottile	Italy	4:38.09	Q
5	3	Anton Stabrovskyy	Ukraine	4:38.94	

=== Heat 2 ===
Rank	Lane	Name	Nationality	Time	Notes
1	4	Sergey Punko	Russia	4:25.03	Q
2	5	Tucker Dupree	United States	4:28.14	Q
3	3	Omar Font	Spain	4:30.13	Q
4	6	Daniel Simon	Germany	4:36.87	Q
5	2	Jose Ramon Cantero Elvira	Spain	4:40.45	
6	7	Oleg Tkalienko	Ukraine	4:57.67	

== Final ==
Rank	Lane	Name	Nationality	Time	Notes
1st place, gold medalist(s)	5	Sergey Punko	Russia	4:10.26	
2nd place, silver medalist(s)	4	Enrique Floriano	Spain	4:14.77	
3rd place, bronze medalist(s)	2	Sergii Klippert	Ukraine	4:17.12	
4	6	Omar Font	Spain	4:21.01	
5	3	Tucker Dupree	United States	4:24.51	
6	1	Daniel Simon	Germany	4:30.95	
7	7	Ignacio Gonzalez	Argentina	4:34.38	
8	8	Fabrizio Sotille	Italy	4:36.74	
