= Wang Yinan =

Chinese Paralympic swimmer

Personal information
- Born: September 19, 1989 (age 36)
Medal record
Swimming (S8)
Representing China
Paralympic Games
Gold medal – first place	2012 London	Men's 100 metre freestyle S8
Gold medal – first place	2012 London	Men's 400 metre freestyle S8
Gold medal – first place	2012 London	Men's 4 × 100 metre medley relay 34pts
Silver medal – second place	2012 London	Men's 4 × 100 metre freestyle relay 34pts
Bronze medal – third place	2012 London	Men's 50 metre freestyle S8
Bronze medal – third place	2016 Rio de Janeiro	Men's 400 metre freestyle S8
IPC World Championships
Silver medal – second place	2015 Glasgow	50 m freestyle S8
Silver medal – second place	2015 Glasgow	100 m freestyle S8
Silver medal – second place	2015 Glasgow	4x100 m medley relay 34pts

Wang Yinan (born September 19, 1989) is a Chinese Paralympic swimmer. At the 2012 Summer Paralympics he won 3 gold medals, 1 silver medal and 1 bronze medal. He won the bronze medal at the Men's 400 metre freestyle S8 event at the 2016 Summer Paralympics with 4:32.78.
