= Maurice Deelen =

Dutch Paralympic swimmer

Personal information
- Nationality: Netherlands
- Born: April 17, 1971 (age 55)

Sport
- Sport: Swimming
- Strokes: Breaststroke, freestyle, individual medley
Medal record
Men's swimming
Representing Netherlands
2012 Paralympic Games
Silver medal – second place	2012 London	50 m freestyle S8
Bronze medal – third place	2012 London	100 m breaststroke SB8
Bronze medal – third place	2012 London	200 m individual medley SM8

Maurice Deelen is a Dutch former swimmer. He won a silver medal at the 2012 Paralympic Games in the 50m freestyle, and bronze medals in the 100m breast and 200m individual medley. He also placed 4th in the 100m freestyle in London. He competed in the Paralympic class S8. Deelen competed in the IPC Euros, winning a silver medal in the 100m freestyle and a gold in the 50m freestyle. In 2012 Deelen won the 100m breaststroke at the Eindhoven swim cup. At age 30, Deelen had a stroke that caused continuing amnesia. In 2009, Deelen won silver medals in the 50m and 100m freestyle at the IPC World Championship. In 2010, Deelen won a silver medal in the 100m breaststroke and bronze medals in the 50m and 100m freestyle at the IPC World Championship.
