= Wang Jiachao =

Chinese Paralympic swimmer and triathlete

Medal record

Representing China

Swimming (Paralympic swimming)

Paralympic Games
Gold medal – first place	2012 London	Men's 4 × 100 metre medley relay 34pts
Silver medal – second place	2008 Beijing	Men's 200 metre individual medley SM8
Silver medal – second place	2012 London	Men's 200 metre individual medley SM8
Silver medal – second place	2012 London	Men's 4 × 100 metre freestyle relay 34pts
Bronze medal – third place	2008 Beijing	Men's 400 metre freestyle S8

Men's paratriathlon

World Championships
Silver medal – second place	2019 Lausanne	PTS4

Wang Jiachao (born September 22, 1991) is a Chinese swimmer who is now a Para triathlete. At the 2012 Summer Paralympics he won 1 gold medal and 2 silver medals. He is currently on track to participate in the Tokyo 2020 Paralympics.
