= Oliver Hynd =

British Paralympic swimmer

Oliver Hynd MBE
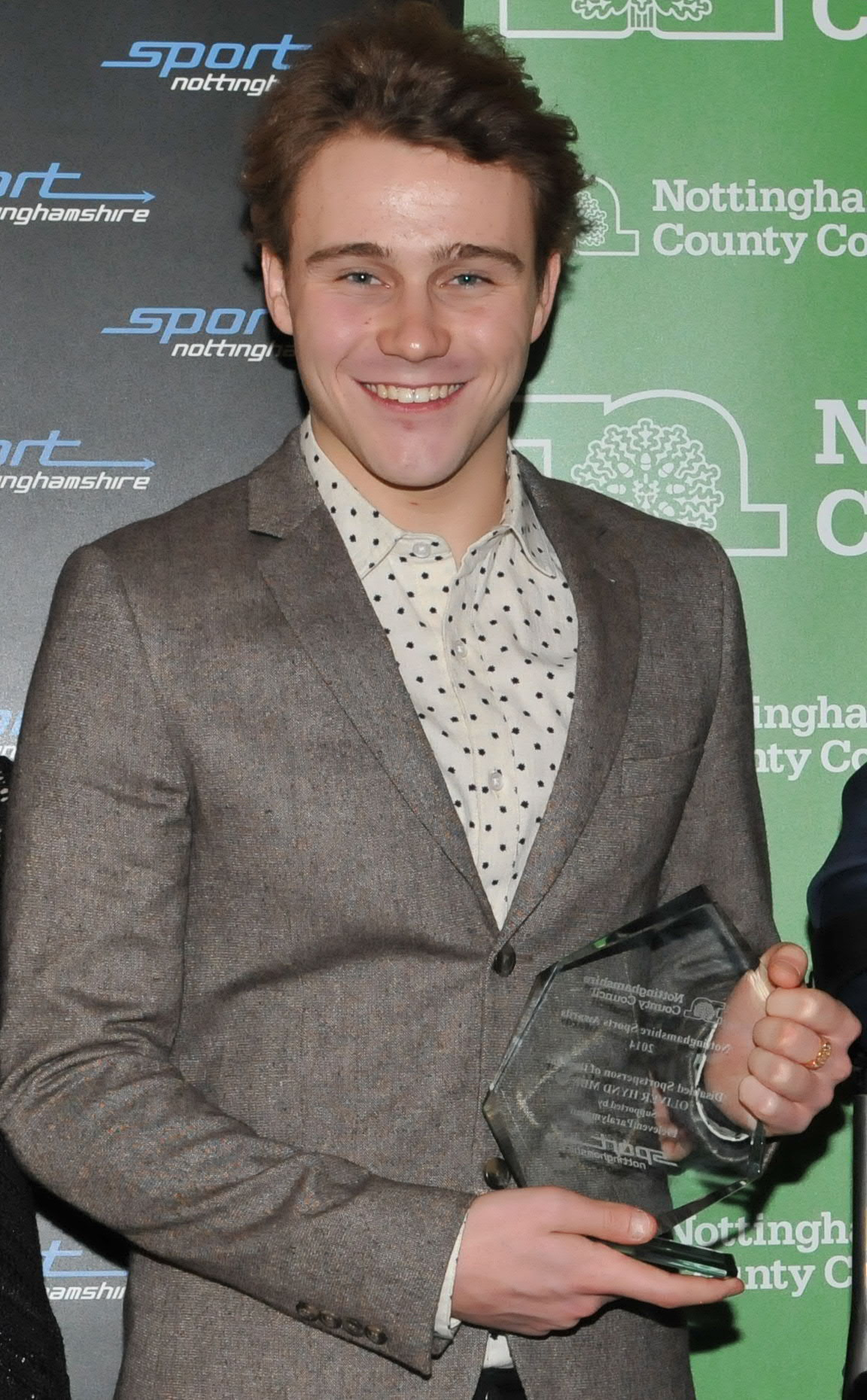
- Hynd with his Disabled Sportsperson of the Year award in February 2015

Personal information
- Born: 27 October 1994 (age 31)
- Education: Ashfield School
- Height: 1.75 m (5 ft 9 in)

Sport
- Country: United Kingdom
- Sport: swimming
- Disability class: S9/SM8/SB9
- Club: Nova Centurion Swim Club, Mansfield
- Coached by: Glenn Smith
Medal record
Event	1st	2nd	3rd
Paralympic Games	3	2	1
World Championships	4	0	2
European Championships	6	4	0
Commonwealth Games	1	0	0
Men's swimming
Representing Great Britain
Paralympic Games
Gold medal – first place	2012 London	SM8 200 m individual medley
Silver medal – second place	2012 London	S8 400 m freestyle
Bronze medal – third place	2012 London	S8 100 m backstroke
Gold medal – first place	2016 Rio de Janeiro	S8 400 m freestyle
Gold medal – first place	2016 Rio de Janeiro	SM8 200 m individual medley
IPC World Championships
Gold medal – first place	2013 Montreal	200 m medley SM8
Gold medal – first place	2013 Montreal	400 m freestyle S8
Gold medal – first place	2015 Glasgow	200 m medley SM8
Gold medal – first place	2015 Glasgow	400 m freestyle S8
Bronze medal – third place	2013 Montreal	100 m backstroke S8
Bronze medal – third place	2015 Glasgow	100 m backstroke S8
European Championships
Gold medal – first place	2011 Berlin	200 m individual medley S8
Silver medal – second place	2011 Berlin	400 m freestyle S8
Gold medal – first place	2014 Eindhoven	400M freestyle S8
Gold medal – first place	2014 Eindhoven	200M medley SM8
Gold medal – first place	2016 Funchal	400m freestyle S8
Gold medal – first place	2016 Funchal	100 m backstroke – S8
Gold medal – first place	2016 Funchal	200 m ind. medley SM8
Silver medal – second place	2014 Eindhoven	4x100m medley 34pts
Silver medal – second place	2016 Funchal	100m freestyle S8
Silver medal – second place	2016 Funchal	4x100m freestyle relay 34pts
Representing England
Commonwealth Games
Gold medal – first place	2014 Glasgow	200 m medley SM8

Oliver William Hynd MBE, known as Ollie, (born 27 October 1994 in Mansfield, Nottinghamshire) is a British swimmer. He competed in the Paralympics as a class 8 swimmer, having neuromuscular myopathy and associated limb deformities. In 2018, following reclassification protocols, Hynd moved into the S9 class, but remained in SB8 for breaststroke.

== Career progress ==
Hynd made his international debut at the 2011 IPC European Championships where he won the 200 m individual medley, beating his older brother Sam's previous European record. In the 400 m freestyle, he finished in second place just behind brother Sam. These results led to Hynd collecting the Junior Disabled Sportsperson Award from his local district council.

Hynd won a gold medal in the SM8 200m individual medley at the 2012 London Paralympics. He also claimed a silver in the S8 men's 400m freestyle and a bronze in the S8 men's 100m backstroke.

He was appointed Member of the Order of the British Empire (MBE) in the 2013 New Year Honours for services to swimming.

In 2015, Hynd was awarded the Disabled Sportsperson of the Year accolade at the Nottinghamshire Sports Awards for the second year in a row.

At the Rio de Janeiro Paralympic Games in 2016, Hynd won the gold medal in his opening event, the 400 m freestyle S8, beating the world record in the final, held on 8 September. He repeated the feat in his closing event, winning gold and setting a new world record in the 200 m individual medley SM8.

== Recognition ==
Originally suggested by Charlotte Henshaw's father, Mansfield District ward councillor Paul Henshaw, to acknowledge the achievements of Ollie Hynd, the council voted in December 2014 to name the 25-metre laned pool at the town's Water Meadows complex as Hynds and Henshaw Competition Pool, to honour Ollie, his brother Sam and Charlotte Henshaw who all trained there.

In 2016, Hynd, Charlotte Henshaw and their swimming coach were all awarded the Freedom of Mansfield.

== See also ==
- 2012 Olympics gold post boxes in the United Kingdom
