= Konstantin Lisenkov =

Russian Paralympic swimmer (born 1989)

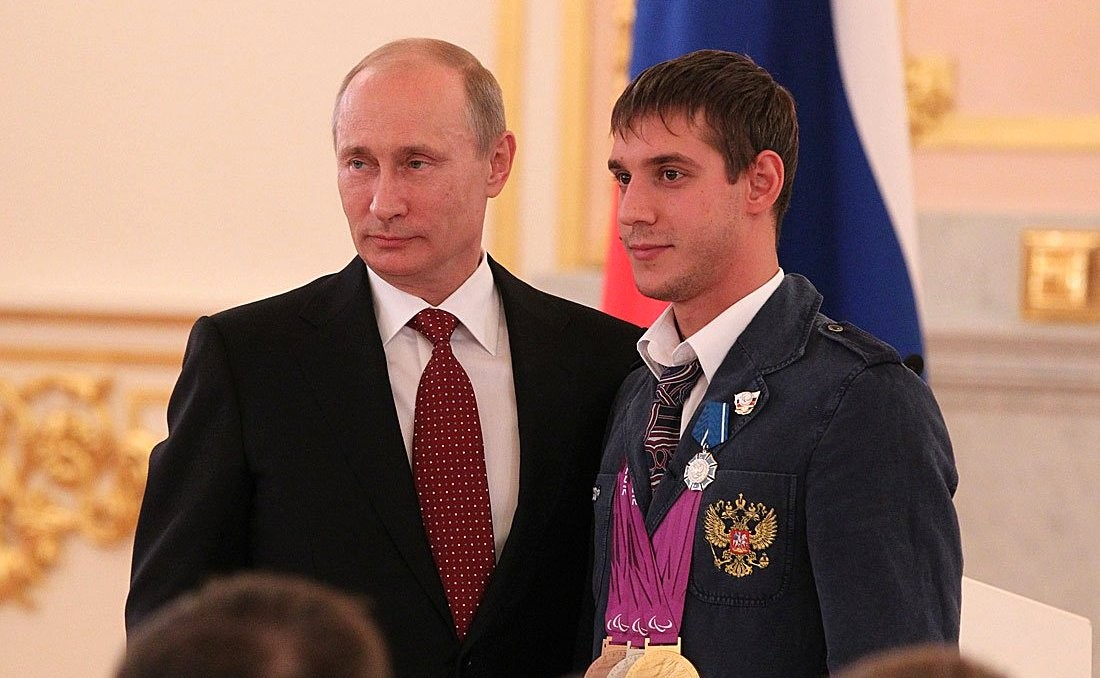
- Vladimir Putin and Konstantin Lisenkov in 2012

Personal information
- Born: Константин Сергеевич Лисенков; 22 June 1989 (age 37) Engels, Saratov Oblast, Russia

Sport
- Sport: Swimming
Medal record
Representing Russia
Paralympic Games
Gold medal – first place	2008 Beijing	100 m backstroke – S8
Gold medal – first place	2012 London	100 m backstroke – S8
Silver medal – second place	2008 Beijing	100 m freestyle – S8
Silver medal – second place	2012 London	4×100 m medley relay 34pts
Bronze medal – third place	2008 Beijing	50 m freestyle – S8
Bronze medal – third place	2012 London	4×100 m freestyle relay 34pts
Bronze medal – third place	2012 London	100 m freestyle – S8
IPC World Championships
Gold medal – first place	2015 Glasgow	100 m freestyle relay 34pts
Gold medal – first place	2015 Glasgow	100 m backstroke S8
Gold medal – first place	2015 Glasgow	4x100 m medley relay 34pts
Silver medal – second place	2015 Glasgow	200 m medley SM8
Bronze medal – third place	2015 Glasgow	50 m freestyle S8
Bronze medal – third place	2015 Glasgow	100 m freestyle SM8
IPC European Championships
Gold medal – first place	2009 Reykjavik	100 m backstroke S8
Silver medal – second place	2009 Reykjavik	50 m freestyle S8

Konstantin Sergeyevich Lisenkov (Russian: Константин Сергеевич Лисенков; born 22 June 1989) is a Paralympic swimmer from Russia competing mainly in category S8 events. He won a two gold, two silver and three bronze medals at the 2008 and 2012 Summer Paralympics. At the 2008 Games he set a new world records in the 100 m backstroke.
