= Yang Guanglong =

Chinese Paralympic swimmer

Personal information
- Nationality: Chinese

Sport
- Sport: Swimming
Medal record
Representing China
Men's Paralympic swimming
Summer Paralympics
| Silver medal – second place | 2024 Paris | 100 m breaststroke S8 |
| Silver medal – second place | 2024 Paris | 200 m ind. medley SM8 |
| Bronze medal – third place | 2016 Rio de Janeiro | 100 m butterfly S8 |
| Bronze medal – third place | 2020 Tokyo | 100 m breaststroke S8 |
| Bronze medal – third place | 2020 Tokyo | 200 m ind. medley SM8 |
| Bronze medal – third place | 2024 Paris | 100 m butterfly S8 |
Asian Para Games
| Silver medal – second place | 2018 Jakarta | 50m Freestyle S8 |
| Silver medal – second place | 2022 Hangzhou | 400 m freestyle S8 |
| Silver medal – second place | 2022 Hangzhou | 200 m ind. medley SM8 |

Yang Guanglong is a Chinese Paralympic swimmer. He won a bronze medal at the Men's 100 metre Butterfly S8 event at the 2016 Summer Paralympics with 1:01.18.
