= Ander Romarate =

Spanish Paralympic swimmer

Personal information
- Nationality: Spain
- Born: 14 June 1994 (age 32) Eibar, Spain

Sport
- Sport: Swimming
- Strokes: Backstroke
- Club: Urbat-Urkotronik

Ander Romarate Agirre (born 14 June 1994) is an S8 swimmer from Spain.

== Personal ==
Romarate has a physical disability that effects both legs. He is from the Basque region of Spain.

== Swimming ==
Romarate is a member of the Urbat-Urkotronik swimming club. He is an S8 classified swimmer, and is a backstroke specialist.

In 2007, Romarate competed in the Spain-hosted national Paralympic swimming championships in Zaragoza, where he earned four silver medals. That year, he also competed in the Children's School Swimming Championships where he earned a gold in the 50 meter freestyle and a silver medal 50 meter backstroke. He competed at a 2008 swimming competition in Tenerife as part of the Spain national team.

Romarate competed at the 2010 Paralympic Swimming Championship of Spain by Autonomous Communities, where he met qualifying times for the 100 backstroke and 100 breaststroke events. At the 2010 Gipuzkoa III Open Championship for disabled, he finished first in three races including the 50 meter backstroke, the 100 meter backstroke and the 200 meter backstroke. He made his swimming World Cup debut in 2010. He competed at the 2010 Adapted Swimming World Championship in the Netherlands, where he finished sixth in the backstroke. His time at the competition was fast enough to qualify him for the 2012 Summer Paralympics. His performance in the 100 meter backstroke was good enough to set a national record. He was part of a Spain relay team that finished fourth. Following his performance, he and another swimmer were honoured by the mayor of Bajo Deba, Gipuzkoa.

At the 2011 Spain Disability Swimming Club Championships, Romarate won five individual gold medals and a silver medal in a relay event. He competed at the event as part of the Basque swimming team, Konporta KE. He competed at the 2011 IPC European Swimming Championships in Berlin, Germany.

In 2012, Romarate competed at the Paralympic Swimming Championship of Spain by Autonomous Communities. He competed at the 2013 IPC Swimming World Championships.
