= Song Maodang =

Chinese Paralympic swimmer

Personal information
- Nationality: Chinese

Sport
- Sport: Swimming
Medal record
Representing China
Men's Paralympic swimming
Summer Paralympics
Silver medal – second place	2012 London	Men's 4 × 100 metre freestyle relay 34pts
Bronze medal – third place	2012 London	Men's 100 metre butterfly S8
Gold medal – first place	2016 Rio de Janeiro	Men's 100 metre Butterfly S8
Silver medal – second place	2016 Rio de Janeiro	Men's 100m Freestyle S8

Song Maodang is a Chinese swimmer. At the 2012 Summer Paralympics he won a silver medal at the Men's 4 × 100 metre freestyle relay 34pts event and a bronze medal at the Men's 100 metre butterfly S8 event. At the 2016 Summer Paralympics he won a gold medal at the Men's 100 metre Butterfly S8 event with a world record and paralympic record of 59.19. He also won a silver medal at the Men's 100m Freestyle S8 event with 58.13.
