= Alejandro Sánchez Palomero =

Spanish Paralympic swimmer (born 1986)

Alejandro Sánchez
Personal information
- Full name: Alejandro Sánchez Palomero
- Nationality: Spanish
- Born: 6 November 1986 (age 39) Salamanca

Sport
- Country: Spain
- Sport: Swimming; Paratriathlon
- Disability class: S8
Medal record
Representing Spain
Paralympic Games
Men's swimming
Bronze medal – third place	2008 Beijing	100 m breaststroke SB8
Men's paratriathlon
Paralympic Games
Bronze medal – third place	2020 Tokyo	PTS4
World Championships
Silver medal – second place	2015 Chicago	PT3
Silver medal – second place	2016 Rotterdam	PT3
Silver medal – second place	2018 Gold Coast	PTS4
Bronze medal – third place	2019 Lausanne	PTS4
Bronze medal – third place	2021 Abu Dhabi	PTS4
European Championships
Gold medal – first place	2015 Geneva	PT3
Gold medal – first place	2016 Lisbon	PT3
Bronze medal – third place	2017 Kitzbühel	PTS4
Bronze medal – third place	2021 Valencia	PTS4
Men's para-aquathlon
World Championships
Gold medal – first place	2014 Edmonton	PT3
European Championships
Gold medal – first place	2018 Ibiza	PTS4
Men's para-duathlon
World Championships
Silver medal – second place	2016 Aviles	PT3
European Championships
Silver medal – second place	2015 Alcobendas	PT3

Alejandro Sánchez Palomero (born 6 November 1986) is a triathlete and former S8 swimmer from Spain.

== Swimming ==
In 2007, Sánchez competed at the IDM German Open. Sánchez competed at the 2010 IPC World Championships in the Netherlands, finishing seventh in the 100 breaststroke and eighth in the 200 individual medley. In 2013, he competed in the Championship of Spain by Autonomous Open Paralympic Swimming where he represented the Balearic Islands.

=== Paralympics ===
Sánchez competed at the 2008 Summer Paralympics, winning a bronze medal in the 100 meter S8 breaststroke. He competed at the 2012 Summer Paralympics, where he did not medal.
