= Jaime Bailón =

Spanish Paralympic swimmer

Personal information
- Full name: Jaime Bailón Galindo
- Nationality: Spain
- Born: 3 January 1978 (age 48) Spain

Sport
- Sport: Swimming

Jaime Bailón Galindo (Note: In this Spanish name, the first or paternal surname is Bailón and the second or maternal family name is Galindo.) (born 3 January 1978) a Paralympic swimmer from Spain.

== Personal ==
Bailón is from the Madrid region of Spain. He has a physical disability.

== Swimming ==
Bailón is an S8 classified swimmer, and is affiliated with the Integra Sports Foundation.

Bailón competed at the 2011 IPC European Swimming Championships in Berlin, Germany, where he won a gold medal in the 4x50 meter medley relay. He finished sixth in the 100 meter butterfly race. In 2012, he competed at the Paralympic Swimming Championship of Spain by Autonomous Communities. He competed at the 2013 IPC Swimming World Championships. He was one of fourteen swimmers from the CN Alcobendas swimming club to participate in a competition at South Park Rivas Vaciamadrid in December 2013.
