= Sean Fraser (swimmer) =

Scottish Paralympic swimmer

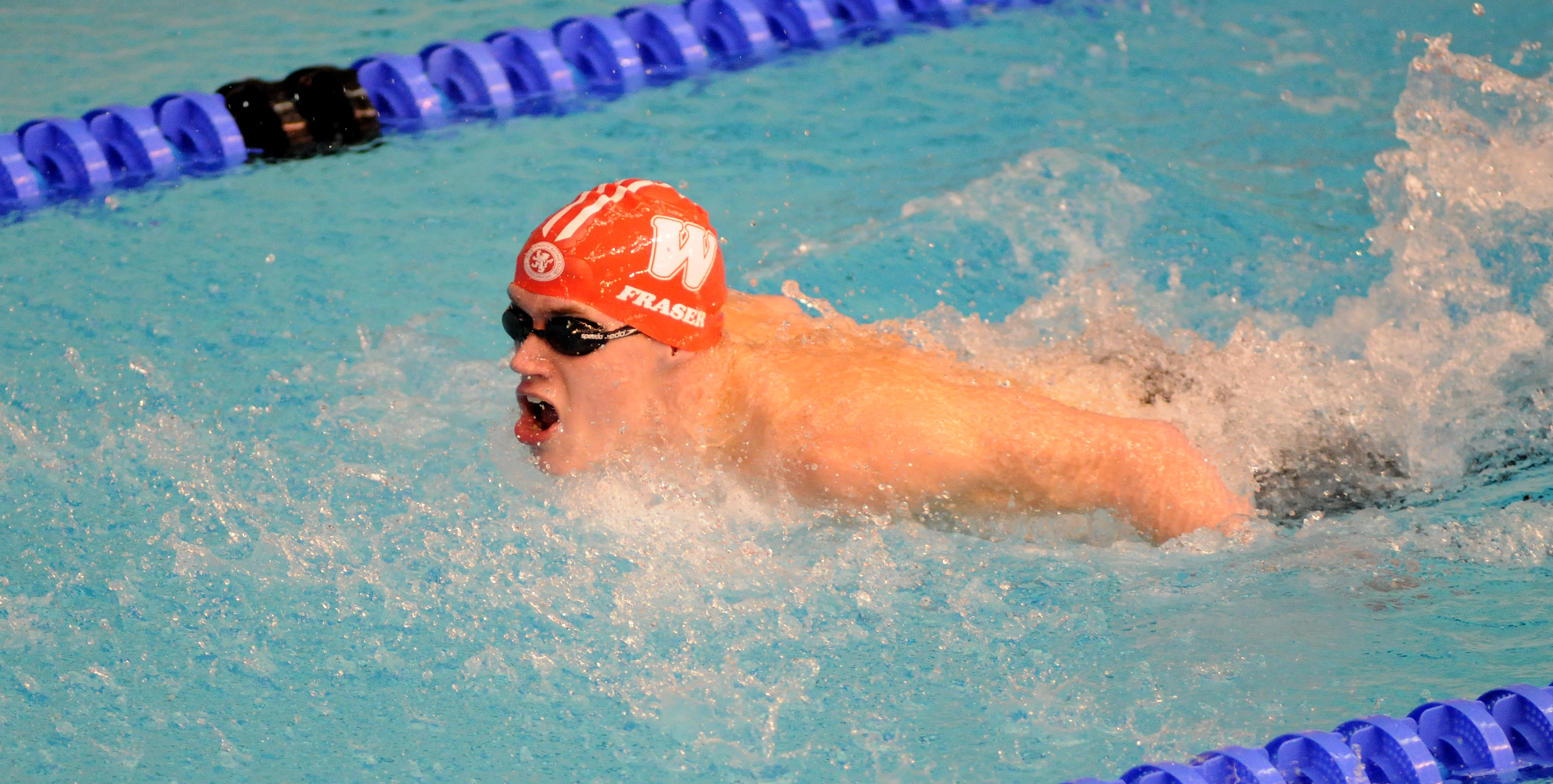
- Fraser in 2008

Personal information
- Born: 30 April 1990 (age 36) Edinburgh, Scotland

Sport
- Country: United Kingdom
- Sport: Paralympic swimming
- Disability class: S8
Medal record
Paralympic swimming
Representing United Kingdom
Paralympic Games
Bronze medal – third place	2008 Beijing	100m backstroke S8
European Championships
Bronze medal – third place	2009 Reykjavik	50m freestyle S8
Bronze medal – third place	2009 Reykjavik	400m freestyle S8
Bronze medal – third place	2009 Reykjavik	100m backstroke S8
Bronze medal – third place	2011 Berlin	4x100m freestyle relay 34pts
Representing Scotland
Commonwealth Games
Silver medal – second place	2010 Delhi	100m freestyle S8

Sean Fraser (born 30 April 1990 in Edinburgh, Scotland) is a Scottish swimmer.

Fraser attended Lasswade High School. He won a bronze medal for Great Britain in the S8 100m backstroke at the Beijing Paralympics 2008, and a gold medal in the 2009 British Championships for the MC 100 m backstroke. He won bronze medals for the S8 50 m Freestyle, 400 m Freestyle and 100 m Backstroke events at the 2009 International Paralympic Committee (IPC) European Swimming Championships in Reykjavík, Iceland. At the 2010 Commonwealth Games in Delhi, India he won a silver medal in Men's 100 m freestyle S8 with a British record time of 1:00.77. He won a bronze medal for the 34pt 4 × 100 m freestyle relay at the 2011 IPC European Swimming Championships in Berlin, Germany. and a gold at the British Championships in 2012 for the MC 100 m freestyle.

Fraser swam for Warrender Baths Club in Edinburgh and Manchester HPC. He was inducted into the Scottish Swimming Hall of Fame in 2018.
