= Óscar Trigo =

Spanish wheelchair basketball coach

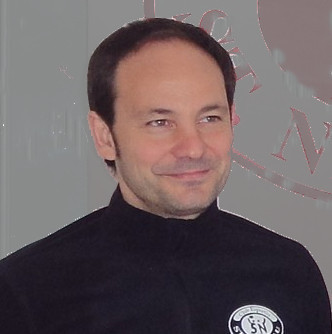

Personal information
- Full name: Óscar Trigo Diez
- Nationality: Spanish
- Born: September 25, 1972 (age 54) Gràcia, Barcelona, Spain

Sport
- Country: Spain
- Sport: Wheelchair basketball

Óscar Trigo Diez (born September 25, 1972, in Gràcia, Barcelona) is a wheelchair basketball coach. He led the Spanish men's national team at the 2012 Summer Paralympics in London.

== Personal ==
Trigo was born on September 25, 1972, in Gracia, Barcelona. He has worked as a physical education teacher.

== Wheelchair basketball ==
Trigo became acquainted with wheelchair basketball while volunteering at the 1992 Summer Paralympic Games1992 Summer Paralympics in Barcelona. Since his early involvement with the game in Spain, the sport has evolved and he has participated in the game's professionalization.

=== National team ===
Trigo first got involved with the national team in 2008 through work with the Sports Federation for People with Physical Disabilities (FEDDF) when he worked with the under-22 national team. As part of the coaching staff of the under-22 team, they achieved a gold medal in the Under-23 European Championship held in Turkey in 2008 and a second-place finish in the under-22 European Championship held in Paris in 2009. As head coach of the national team, he contributed to raising the standards of player preparation, being the first coach to invest in a multidisciplinary team of professionals in different performance areas (psychology, medicine, biomechanics, nutrition). He also promoted stricter criteria as a selector to generate the definitive teams presented in each international competition. He coached the national team at the European Championships in 2009 in Turkey (7th place), 2011 in Israel (3rd place), 2013 in Frankfurt (3rd place), and 2018 in Poland (2nd place). He coached the national team in the following World Championships: 2014 in Incheon (4th place) and 2018 in Hamburg (5th place). He coached the national team at the Summer Paralympic Games in London 2012 (5th place) and Tokyo 2021 (4th place). In the 2016 Summer Paralympic Games in Brazil, he was part of the organizing staff responsible for the national team, securing a 2nd place. Since January 2022, Oscar Trigo has taken charge of the Portuguese national wheelchair basketball team. With this team, he competed in the C-level European Championship, guiding them to a 2nd place in the championship and achieving promotion to a higher category.

=== Club ===
The first club side Trigo coached was FCBarcelona-Guttmann in the top level of Spanish club wheelchair basketball. He has also coached the Catalan representative team. From September 2012 to July 2015, he coached the CE San Nicolau team in Sabadell, in the Spanish Basketball League. Upon joining the team, he planned to start a team from scratch with the aim of developing players and progressing the team from lower to upper division in Spanish club wheelchair basketball. This project continued, creating a wheelchair basketball club, CE Global Basket, which he directed from the 2015 season to the 2019 season, leading the team to the second-best national league and guiding young talents to the highest competitive level. One of his proteges was Oscar Onrubia, a current professional player in the national league. After the Tokyo Olympics, Trigo returned to coach the FC Barcelona-Unessantfeliu wheelchair basketball team. In two seasons, the team played at the highest level of the second national league, contending for promotion in both seasons. However, bureaucratic relegation forced Trigo to leave the team's bench in July 2023."
