= Charles Rozoy =

French Paralympic swimmer

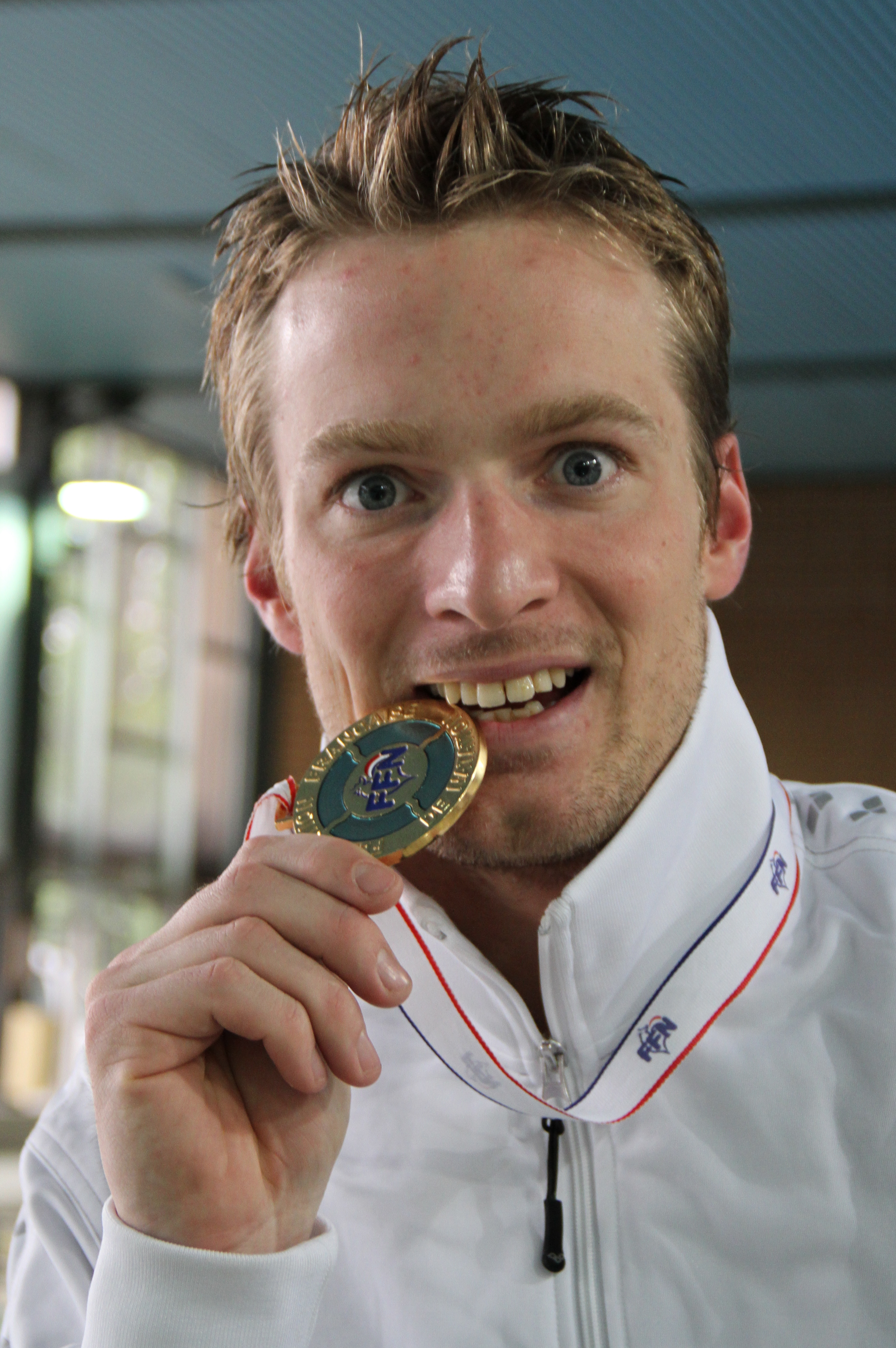

Personal information
- Nationality: France
- Born: 4 March 1987 (age 39) Chenôve, France

Sport
- Sport: Swimming
- Strokes: butterfly, freestyle
Medal record
Men's para swimming (S10)
Representing France
Paralympic Games
| Gold medal – first place | 2012 London | 100m butterfly S8 |
IPC World Championships
| Silver medal – second place | 2015 Glasgow | 100m butterfly S8 |
| Bronze medal – third place | 2010 Eindhoven | 100m butterfly S8 |
| Bronze medal – third place | 2010 Eindhoven | 4x50m freestyle relay 20pts |
| Bronze medal – third place | 2013 Montreal | 50m freestyle S8 |
| Bronze medal – third place | 2013 Montreal | 100m butterfly S8 |
IPC European Championships
| Gold medal – first place | 2009 Reykjavik | 100 m butterfly S8 |
| Silver medal – second place | 2016 Funchal | 100 m butterfly – S8 |
| Bronze medal – third place | 2016 Funchal | 100 m breaststroke – SB8 |

Charles Rozoy (born 4 March 1987 in Chenôve) is a Paralympic swimmer of France who won a gold medal at the 2012 Summer Paralympics in the men's S8 100m butterfly.
