= Australia at the 2012 Summer Paralympics =

- IPC code: AUS
- NPC: Australian Paralympic Committee
- Website: www.paralympic.org.au

in London
- Competitors: 161 in 13 sports
- Flag bearers: Greg Smith (opening) and Evan O'Hanlon (closing)
- Medals Ranked 5th: Gold 32 Silver 23 Bronze 30 Total 85

Summer Paralympics appearances (overview)
- 1960; 1964; 1968; 1972; 1976; 1980; 1984; 1988; 1992; 1996; 2000; 2004; 2008; 2012; 2016; 2020; 2024

Australia competed at the 2012 Summer Paralympics Games in London, United Kingdom, from 29 August to 9 September 2012. The London Games were the biggest Games with 164 nations participating, 19 more than in the 2008 Beijing Paralympic. Australia has participated at every Summer Paralympic Games and hosted the 2000 Sydney Games. As such, the 2000 Sydney Games, regarded as one of the more successful Games, became a point-of-reference and an inspiration in the development of the 2012 London Games.

Australia finished 5th in the final medal count with 85 medals: 32 gold medals, 23 silver medals and 30 bronze medals.

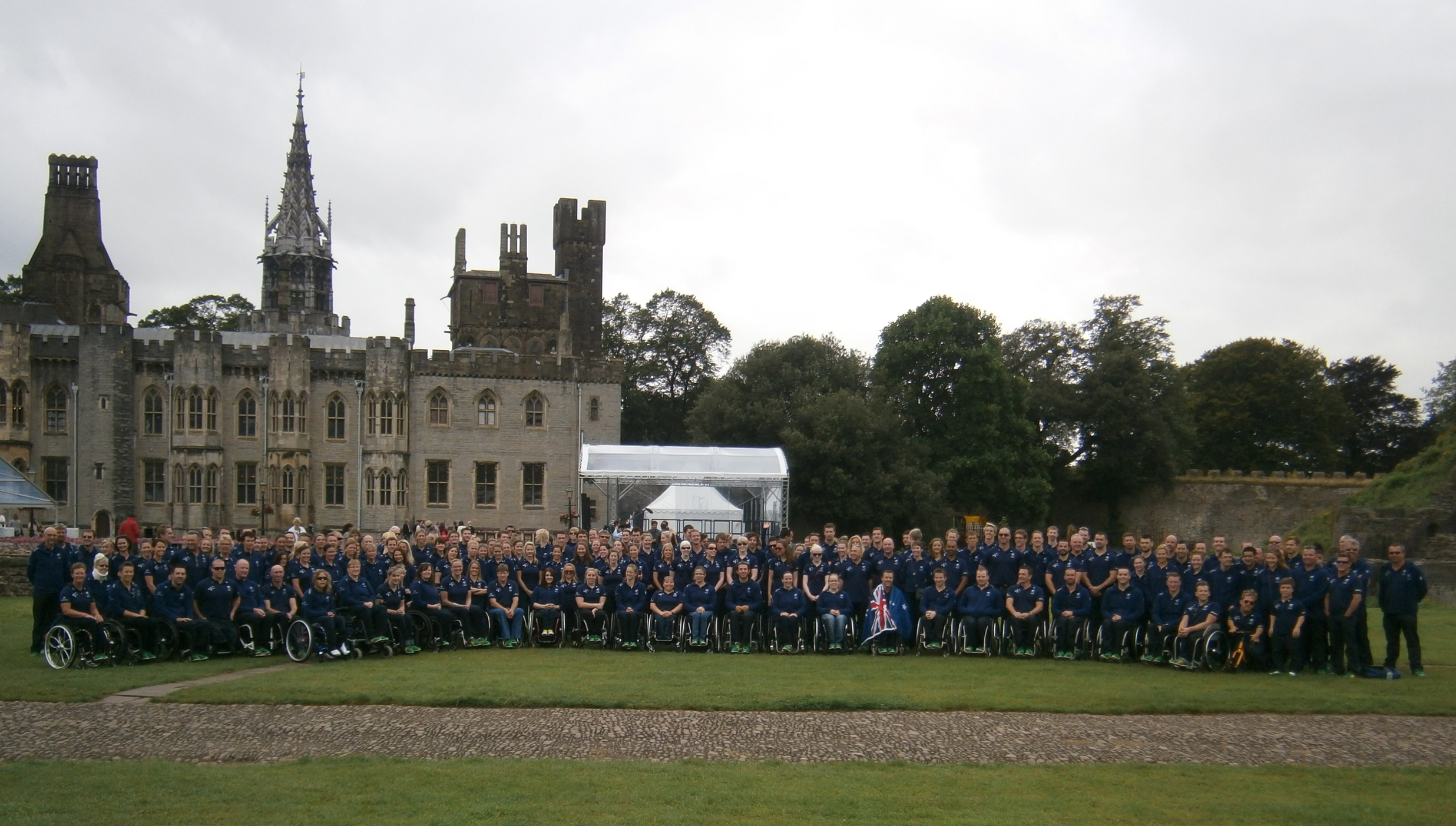
Australian team portrait taken at Cardiff Castle during pre Games training camp

== Context ==
The 2012 London Paralympic Games were officially opened on Wednesday 29 August by Queen Elizabeth II at The Olympic Stadium in London. The Games had a record number of participating athletes at 4327, made up of 2736 men and 1501 women. London hosted 503 medal-winning events in 20 different sports. The Paralympians competed under six different impairment groups: amputees, blind and visually impaired, cerebral palsied, intellectually disabled, Les Autres and spinal cord injuries. These athletes set 251 new world records and 314 Paralympic Games records.

During the Games, 2.7 million tickets were sold with most events and sessions selling out. Media coverage of the Paralympic Games was high. The Games were shown in more countries than previous Games, attracting the biggest international audience yet.

== The Australian team ==
An interview with Michael Hartung, assistant Chef de Mission for Australia while in London

The Australian Paralympic Team launch was held at Parliament House, Canberra on 25 June 2012. Prime Minister Julia Gillard and the Leader of the Opposition Tony Abbott farewelled the team. Julia Gillard told the athletes that they were "the fastest, the strongest, the best". Tony Abbott said "you are best of the best. In fact you are better than that because each one of you has mastered a significant disability to be in this team". Gillard stated that the Australian Government has invested A$13 million in team funding during the last year. The Australian Paralympic Committee organised a Staging Camp in Cardiff, Wales from 1 to 28 August 2012 to allow the Australian team to prepare for the Games.

The 2012 Australian Paralympic team had 161 athletes, 90 men and 71 women, competing in 13 sports. About half the team attended their first Games. Shooter Libby Kosmala, at the age of 70, was Australia's oldest competitor. Swimmer Maddison Elliott, at the age of thirteen, was the youngest.

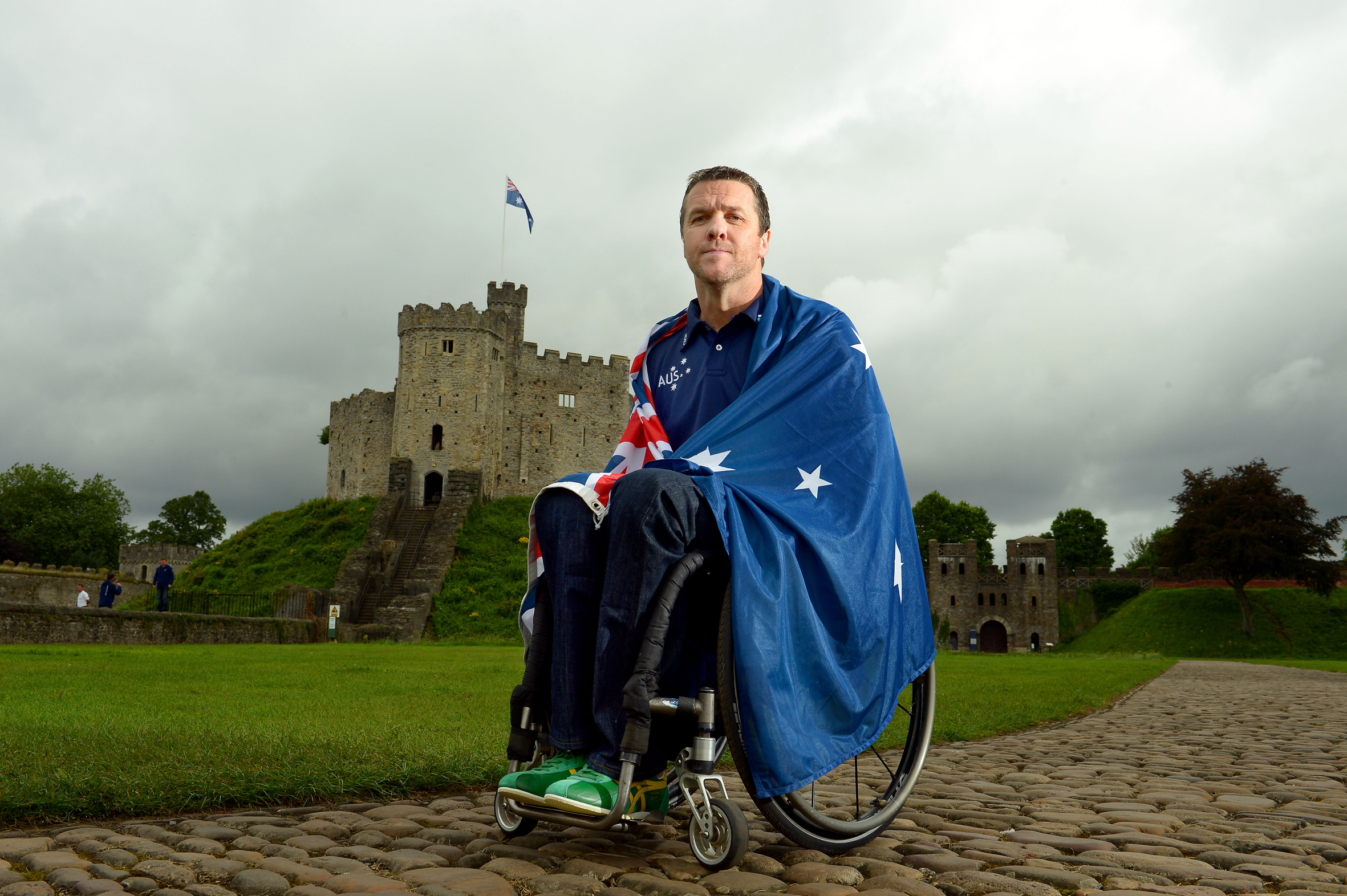
Greg Smith wraps himself in the Australian Flag outside Cardiff Castle after the announcement that he would be the 2012 Australian Flag Bearer

Jason Hellwig, the Australian Paralympic Committee's chief executive, was the Chef de Mission. While Michael Hartung and Kate McLoughlin were the Deputy Chefs de Mission.

On 21 August 2012, Greg Smith, a wheelchair rugby player and former track and field athlete, was announced as the Australian flag bearer for the London 2012 Summer Paralympics opening ceremony. The announcement was made at a special ceremony for the Australian Paralympic Team in front of Cardiff Castle in Wales.

The Australian Paralympic Committee worked to classify each Australian Paralympian's individual disability well before the London Games. This was to ensure that each Paralympian qualified for their event and to "minimise any effect on [each Paralympian's] Games preparation”. As such, the number of classifiers in the Australian Paralympic Committee, with the capacity to classify an athlete's impairment group, increased to 176 from 166 during 2011–2012.

== 2012 Paralympians of the Year Awards ==
- Australian Paralympian of the Year: Jacqueline Freney
- APC President's Medal for Excellence in Sportsmanship: Libby Kosmala (shooting)/ Kieran Modra (cycling)
- Male Athlete of the Year: Evan O’Hanlon (athletics)
- Female Athlete of the Year: Jacqueline Freney (swimming)
- Junior Athlete of the Year: Maddison Elliott (swimming)/ Rheed McCracken (athletics)
- Team of the Year: The Steelers (wheelchair rugby)/ SKUD18 crew (sailing)
- Coach of the Year: Peter Day (cycling)
- Paralympic Achievement Award: Matthew Cowdrey (swimming)

== Notable Australian performances ==
=== Jacqueline Freney ===
A cerebral palsy swimmer and the highest achieving individual athlete of the Games, winning eight gold medals. This is the most gold medals won by an Australian athlete at a single Paralympic Games.

- Awards: Australian Paralympian of the Year 2012 and Australian Female Athlete of the Year.

- The most successful individual medallist of any nation in London.

- Ranked equal first on total medals won at a single Paralympic Games with fellow Australian swimmer Matthew Cowdrey and USA swimmer Jessica Long, with eight medals in total.

- Events where Freney won a gold medal:

- 100 m backstroke (S7)
- 50 m butterfly (S7)
- 100 m freestyle (S7)
- 50 m freestyle (S7)
- 400 m freestyle (S7)
- 200 m individual medley (SM7)
- Women's 4x100 m freestyle relay (34 pts) with Ellie Cole, Katherine Downie, Maddison Elliott
- Women's 4x100 m medley relay (34 pts) with Ellie Cole, Katherine Downie, Annabelle Williams

=== Matthew Cowdrey ===
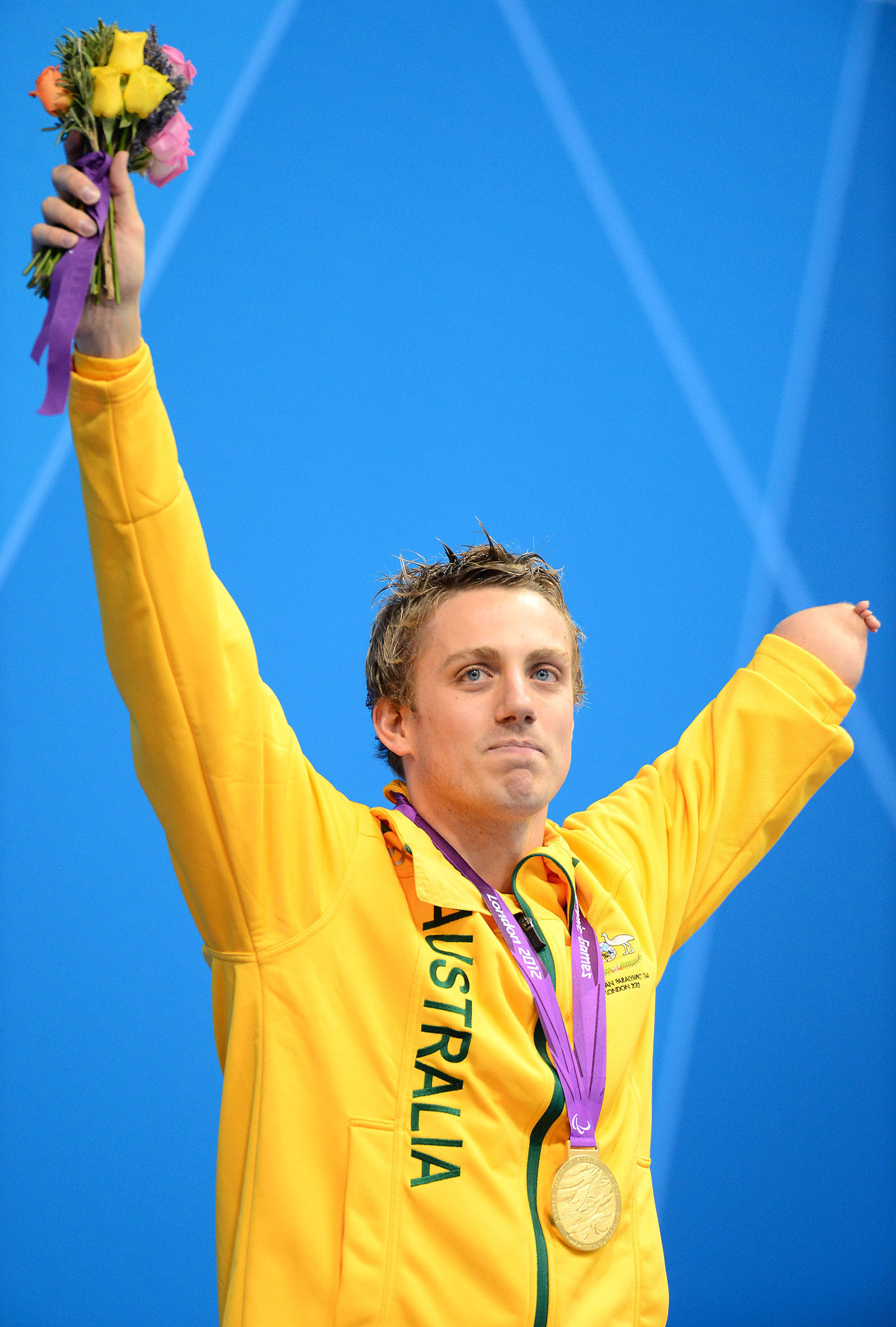
Cowdrey, gold medallist. at the 2012 London Paralympics

An arm amputee swimmer, winning eight medals – five gold, two silver and one bronze medal. During the Games, he became Australia's greatest Paralympian in terms of gold and total medals. He finished the Games with 13 gold medals.

- Awards: Paralympic Achievement Award

-Events where Cowdrey won a gold medal:

- 100 m backstroke (S9)
- 50 m freestyle (S9)
- 100 m freestyle (S9)
- 200 m individual medley (SM9)
- Men's 4x100 m freestyle relay (34 pts) with Michael Anderson, Michael Auprince, Blake Cochrane, Matthew Haanappel Brenden Hall, Matthew Levy, Andrew Pasterfield

- Events where Cowdrey won a silver medal:

- 100 m butterfly (S9)
- 100 m breaststroke (SB8)

- Events where Cowdrey won a silver medal:

- Men's 4x100 m medley relay (34 pts) with Michael Anderson, Michael Auprince, Matthew Haanappel, Brenden Hall, Matthew Levy, Andrew Pasterfield, Rick Pendleton

=== Evan O'Hanlon ===
A cerebral palsy athletics sprinter, winning two gold medals.

- Awards: Australian Male Athlete of the Year

- Events where O’Hanlon won a gold medal:

- 100 m (T38)
- 200 m (T38)

=== Ellie Cole ===
A leg amputee swimmer, winning 4 gold medals and 2 bronze medals.

- Events where Cole won a gold medal:

- 100 m backstroke (S9)
- 100 m freestyle (S9)
- Women's 4x100 m freestyle relay (34 pts) with Katherine Downie, Maddison Elliott, Jacqueline Freney
- Women's 4x100 m medley relay (34 pts) with Katherine Downie, Jacqueline Freney, Annabelle Williams

- Events where Cole won a bronze medal:

- 50 m freestyle (S9)
- 400 m freestyle (S9)

=== Maddison Elliott ===
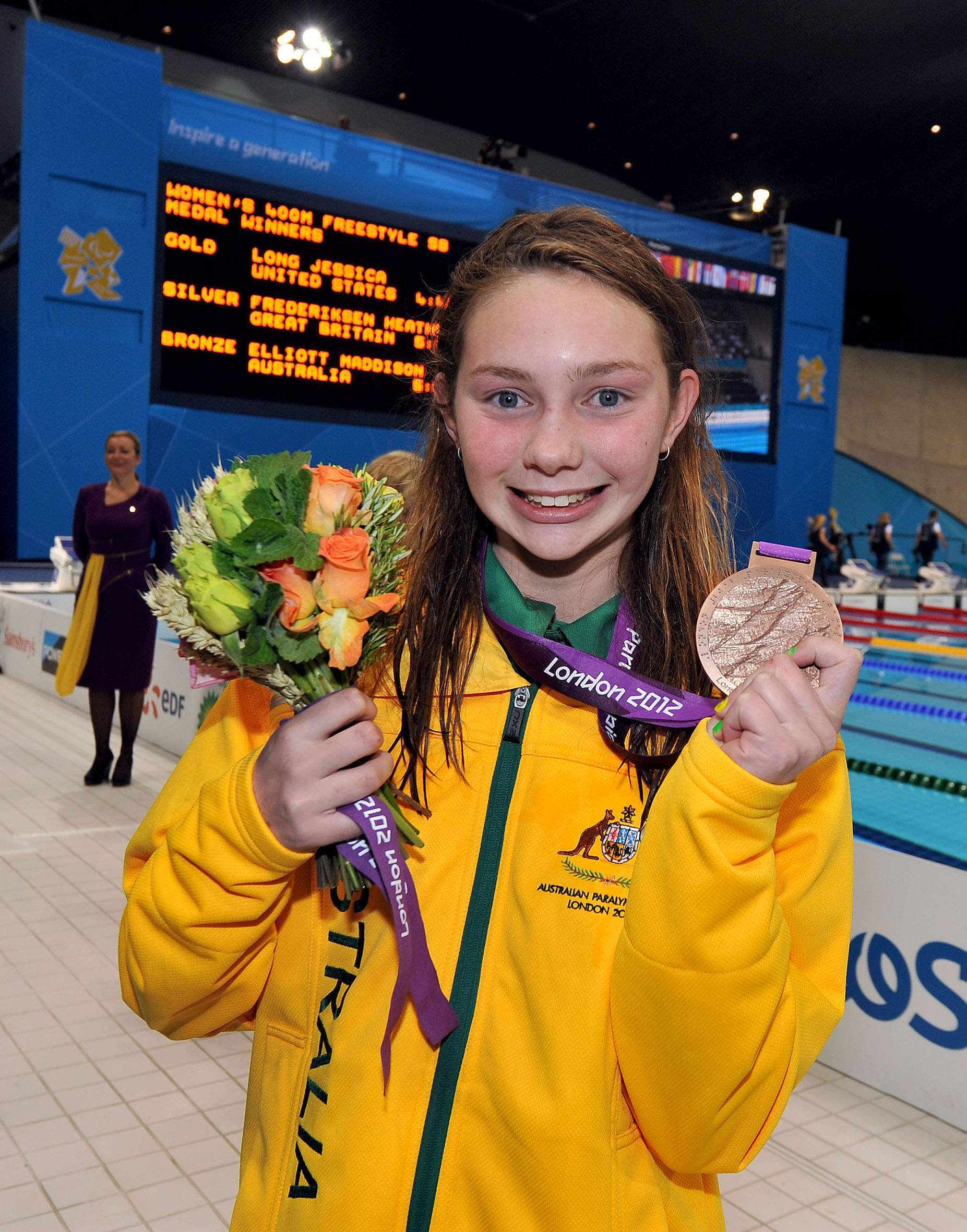
Elliott at the 2012 Summer Paralympics

A cerebral palsy swimmer, at the age of thirteen, became Australia's youngest gold medalist and medalist.^{[2]}

- Awards: Australian Junior Athlete of the Year

- Event where Elliott won a gold medal:

- Women's 4x100 m freestyle relay (34 pts) with Ellie Cole, Katherine Downie, Jacqueline Freney

- Event where Elliott won a silver medal:

- 50 m freestyle (S8)

- Events where Elliott won a bronze medal:

- 100 m freestyle (S8)
- 400 m freestyle (S8)

=== Australian wheelchair rugby team and the SKUD 18 sailing team ===
The wheelchair rugby team won its first Paralympic Games gold medal and the SKUD 18 sailing team won the first sailing gold medal since the Sydney Games in 2000.

- Awards: Team of the Year – Australian wheelchair rugby team, The Steelers, and the SKUD 18 sailing team, Daniel Fitzgibbon and Liesl Tesch.

- Events where they won a gold medal:

- Wheelchair rugby
- SKUD 18 sailing

== Media coverage ==
The International Paralympic Committee said that "the London Paralympic 2012 Games were watched by a cumulative international audience of 3.4 billion (excluding the host nation), which is an increase of around 37 percent on the last summer Games in Beijing".

The Australian Broadcasting Corporation (ABC) was the official Australian broadcaster.

The ABC provided over 100 hours of free to air coverage on ABC1. This coverage had a broadcast team of veteran Olympic and Paralympic athletes. ABC2 broadcast live panel programs at night. These programs aimed “to look at the lighter side of the games”. The ABC also had regular updates on News 24 and on their website, ABC online. Through this website and ABC's iView, Australians were able to access Paralympic coverage at any time.

The average number of audience viewers per day was 1.6 million people. The Australian Paralympic Team's Facebook page grew by 16,000 fans and its YouTube channel reached close to 474,000 views.

The Australian Government declared that the coverage was “the most comprehensive ever implemented by the Australian Paralympic Committee Communications division”.

Statistics show that the number of media stories about the Paralympic Games has increased each time since the 2004 Athens Summer Paralympic Games.

	Radio	Television	Print	Internet	Total
Athens 2004	8426	8915	2037	288	19666
Beijing 2008	14829	11646	4084	1450	31986
London 2012	26849	30032	4178	2284	63343
	Number of media articles on various platforms				

The number of media stories increased over time because of interest. The table below shows the increased interest by the Australian public as it shows the increasing number of viewers in millions.

	Radio	Television	Print	Total
Athens 2004	156.68	204.39	204.82	565.89
Beijing 2008	158.75	265.28	345.89	769.84
London 2012	229.11	302.86	398.59	924.81
	Number of viewers in millions			

== Effects of the London 2012 Paralympic Games on Australian society ==
The media coverage on the Paralympic Games had an effect on Australian society. The increased coverage and increased audiences showed Australia's increased interest in Paralympic sport.

Light-hearted panel shows aided this interest. For instance, Australian comedian, Adam Hills, created a show called The Last Leg. Hills hosts the show with Alex Brooker, both of whom are disabled, and with comedian Josh Widdicombe. Broadcast on the ABC in Australia and on Channel 4 in the UK, the show recapped each day's competition at the London 2012 Paralympics, engaging in feedback from the public, which “facilitated dialogue… [and encouraged the exploration of] issues of disability in an open and respectful but also playful way”.

These panel shows and high-profile Paralympic athletes are using their position for political activism. Consequently, it is argued that the media and individual Paralympic athletes have “helped change societal perspectives… [as] para-athletes are now increasingly being judged alongside other sporting peers with or without a disability”.

As such, Paralympians are now beginning to have commercial success. For instance, Paralympians Kelly Cartwright, Ahmed Kelly, Dylan Alcott, Kurt Fearnley and Evan O’Hanlon featured in Qantas’ London 2012 Ambassador Program and the airline's in-flight safety message, which ran from June 2012.

Paralympians Kurt Fearnley, Matt Cowdrey, Kelly Cartwright and Toby Kane made eleven public appearances for Telstra.

While Paralympians Dylan Alcott, Grace Bowman, Matthew Cowdrey and Jessica Gallagher appeared in the Swisse Vitamins television commercials.

On a broader level, the International Olympic Committee (IOC) and the International Paralympic Committee (IPC) suggest that the Olympics and Paralympics provide inspiration for ordinary people to get motivated to participate in sport, known as the “trickle-down effect”.

However, research by the Australian Centre for Olympic Studies refutes their statement. They argue that data from the Exercise Recreation and Sport survey shows that “no increase of participation in Olympic sports was found”, which suggests that Olympic sport does not inspire the “trickle-down effect”. However, they also note that a similar study “cannot be carried out for Paralympic sports” because Commonwealth and State departments of sport “never included a disability module”.

A report by Disability Rights Now suggests that “support for grassroots participation and pathways to elite level competition is lacking”. They argue against relying on the Australian Paralympic Committee's (APC) Talent Search Program and the APC's emphasis on elite development over grassroots participation.

However, the Australian Government argues that the Talent Search Program is successful. For the 2012 London Paralympics, 43 Paralympic athletes on the Australian team were found using this program. Of these athletes, twenty-five won a medal at the 2012 Games – ten gold, seven silver and eleven bronze – which is 32.9 per cent of Australia's total medal tally.

Also, the program has achieved better results than the previous Talent Search period, as demonstrated in the table below:

Talent Search Program table

Talent Search period	Period	Identified tier-1 and -2 athletes	Paralympic Preparation Programs Shadow Squad members	Australian Paralympic Team	Paralympic podium athletes
2005–2008	940	423	53	27	15
2009–2012	1031	623	92	43	23

== Medalists ==
Medals by sport
Sport	Gold medal	Silver medal	Bronze medal	Total
Athletics	5	9	13	27
Cycling	6	4	4	14
Equestrian	1	0	0	1
Goalball	0	0	0	0
Powerlifting	0	0	0	0
Rowing	0	1	0	1
Sailing	1	0	0	1
Shooting	0	0	1	1
Swimming	18	7	12	37
Table tennis	0	0	0	0
Wheelchair basketball	0	2	0	2
Wheelchair rugby	1	0	0	1
Wheelchair tennis	0	0	0	0
Total	32	23	30	85

Medals by date
Day	Date	Gold medal	Silver medal	Bronze medal	Total
1	30 Aug	3	3	3	9
2	31 Aug	4	1	5	10
3	1 Sep	4	1	5	10
4	2 Sep	3	6	5	14
5	3 Sep	2	2	1	5
6	4 Sep	2	0	2	4
7	5 Sep	4	3	2	9
8	6 Sep	3	2	3	8
9	7 Sep	4	2	0	6
10	8 Sep	2	3	3	8
11	9 Sep	1	0	1	2
Total		32	23	30	85

Medal	Name	Sport	Event	Date
Gold	Kelly Cartwright	Athletics	Women's long jump F42/44	2 September
Gold	Evan O'Hanlon	Athletics	Men's 100 m T38	1 September
Gold	Evan O'Hanlon	Athletics	Men's 200 m T38	8 September
Gold	Richard Colman	Athletics	Men's 800 m T53	5 September
Gold	Todd Hodgetts	Athletics	Men's shot put F20	7 September
Gold	Susan Powell	Cycling	Women's individual pursuit C4	30 August
Gold	Kieran Modra, Scott McPhee (pilot)	Cycling	Men's individual pursuit B	30 August
Gold	Felicity Johnson, Stephanie Morton (pilot)	Cycling	Women's 1km time trial B	31 August
Gold	David Nicholas	Cycling	Men's individual C 3 Road Time Trial	5 September
Gold	Carol Cooke	Cycling	Mixed T 1–2 Road Time Trial	5 September
Gold	Michael Gallagher	Cycling	Men's individual C5 pursuit	1 September
Gold	Joann Formosa	Equestrian	Grade 1B individual Championship	1 September
Gold	Daniel Fitzgibbon, Liesl Tesch	Sailing	Two Person Keelboat SKUD 18	6 September
Gold	Matthew Cowdrey	Swimming	Men's 100 m backstroke S9	31 August
Gold	Matthew Cowdrey	Swimming	Men's 50 m freestyle S9	5 September
Gold	Matthew Cowdrey	Swimming	Men's 200 m individual medley SM9	6 September
Gold	Matthew Cowdrey	Swimming	Men's 100 m freestyle S9	7 September
Gold	Ellie Cole	Swimming	Women's 100 m freestyle S9	7 September
Gold	Ellie Cole	Swimming	Women's 100 m backstroke S9	31 August
Gold	Jacqueline Freney	Swimming	Women's 100 m backstroke S7	30 August
Gold	Jacqueline Freney	Swimming	Women's 50 m butterfly S7	31 August
Gold	Jacqueline Freney	Swimming	Women's 200 m individual medley SM7	2 September
Gold	Jacqueline Freney	Swimming	Women's 100 m freestyle S7	3 September
Gold	Jacqueline Freney	Swimming	Women's 50 m freestyle S7	4 September
Gold	Jacqueline Freney	Swimming	Women's 400 m freestyle S7	6 September
Gold	Brenden Hall	Swimming	Men's 400 m freestyle S9	4 September
Gold	Blake Cochrane	Swimming	Men's 100 m breaststroke SB7	1 September
Gold	Prue Watt	Swimming	Women's 100 m breaststroke SB13	9 September
Gold	Andrew Pasterfield, Matthew Levy, Blake Cochrane, Matthew Cowdrey (Final); Brenden Hall, Michael Auprince, Michael Anderson, Matthew Haanappel (Heat)	Swimming	Men's 4 x 100 m freestyle relay 34 points	2 September
Gold	Ellie Cole, Maddison Elliott, Katherine Downie, Jacqueline Freney (Final)	Swimming	Women's 4 x 100 m freestyle relay 34 points	3 September
Gold	Ellie Cole, Katherine Downie, Annabelle Williams, Jacqueline Freney	Swimming	Women's 4 x 100 m medley relay 34 points	7 September
Gold	Australia national wheelchair rugby team: Ryley Batt; Chris Bond; Cameron Carr; Nazim Erdem; Josh Hose; Jason Lees; Andrew Harrison; Cody Meakin; Ben Newton; Ryan Scott; Greg Smith	Wheelchair rugby	Mixed tournament	9 September
Silver	Carlee Beattie	Athletics	Women's long jump F46	2 September
Silver	Kurt Fearnley	Athletics	Men's 5000 m T54	2 September
Silver	Brad Scott	Athletics	Men's 1500 m T37	3 September
Silver	Kelly Cartwright	Athletics	Women's 100 m T42	5 September
Silver	Louise Ellery	Athletics	Women's shot put F32–34	6 September
Silver	Angie Ballard	Athletics	Women's 200 m T53	6 September
Silver	Angie Ballard	Athletics	Women's 400 m T53	8 September
Silver	Scott Reardon	Athletics	Men's 100 m T42	7 September
Silver	Rheed McCracken	Athletics	Men's 100 m T34	8 September
Silver	Simone Kennedy	Cycling	Women's individual pursuit C1–3	30 August
Silver	Bryce Lindores, Sean Finning (pilot)	Cycling	Men's individual pursuit B	30 August
Silver	Susan Powell	Cycling	Women's individual C 4 Road Time Trial	5 September
Silver	Nigel Barley	Cycling	Men's individual H 3 Road Time Trial	5 September
Silver	Erik Horrie	Rowing	Men's Single Sculls ASM1x	2 September
Silver	Taylor Corry	Swimming	Women's 100 m backstroke S14	31 August
Silver	Taylor Corry	Swimming	Women's 200 m freestyle S14	2 September
Silver	Matthew Cowdrey	Swimming	Men's 100 m butterfly S9	30 August
Silver	Matthew Cowdrey	Swimming	Men's 100 m breaststroke SB8	1 September
Silver	Daniel Fox	Swimming	Men's 200 m freestyle S14	2 September
Silver	Maddison Elliott	Swimming	Women's 50 m freestyle S8	2 September
Silver	Matthew Levy	Swimming	Men's 100 m freestyle S7	3 September
Silver	Australia women's national wheelchair basketball team: Amanda Carter; Shelley Chaplin; Cobi Crispin; Leanne del Toso; Kylie Gauci; Katie Hill; Bridie Kean; Tina McKenzie; Amber Merritt; Clare Nott; Sarah Stewart; Sarah Vinci	Wheelchair basketball	Women's tournament	7 September
Silver	Australia men's national wheelchair basketball team: Dylan Alcott; Jannik Blair; Justin Eveson; Michael Hartnett; Tristan Knowles; Bill Latham; Grant Mizens; Brad Ness; Shaun Norris; Tige Simmons; Brett Stibners; Nick Taylor	Wheelchair basketball	Men's tournament	8 September
Bronze	Rosemary Little	Athletics	Women's 100 m T34	31 August
Bronze	Kath Proudfoot	Athletics	Women's Discus F35-36	31 August
Bronze	Madeleine Hogan	Athletics	Women's javelin throw F46	1 September
Bronze	Georgia Beikoff	Athletics	Women's javelin throw F37/38	8 September
Bronze	Brad Scott	Athletics	Men's 800 m T37	1 September
Bronze	Angie Ballard	Athletics	Women's 100 m T53	2 September
Bronze	Christie Dawes	Athletics	Women's 5000 m T54	2 September
Bronze	Richard Colman	Athletics	Men's 400 m T53	2 September
Bronze	Simon Patmore	Athletics	Men's 200 m T46	2 September
Bronze	Russell Short	Athletics	Men's shot put F11–12	3 September
Bronze	Rheed McCracken	Athletics	Men's 200 m T34	4 September
Bronze	Kurt Fearnley	Athletics	Men's Marathon- T54	9 September
Bronze	Richard Colman, Nathan Arkley, Richard Nicholson, Matthew Cameron	Athletics	Men's 4 x 400 m relay T53/54	8 September
Bronze	Alexandra Green	Cycling	Women's individual pursuit C4	30 August
Bronze	Jayme Paris	Cycling	Women's individual C1-2-3 500 m Time Trial	1 September
Bronze	Michael Gallagher	Cycling	Men's individual C 5 Road Time Trial	5 September
Bronze	David Nicholas	Cycling	Men's individual C1-3 Road Race	6 September
Bronze	Natalie Smith	Shooting	Women's R2-10 m air rifle standing SH1	30 August
Bronze	Tim Antalfy	Swimming	Men's 100 m butterfly S13	31 August
Bronze	Maddison Elliott	Swimming	Women's 100 m freestyle S8	6 September
Bronze	Maddison Elliott	Swimming	Women's 400 m freestyle S8	31 August
Bronze	Matthew Levy	Swimming	Men's 100 m breaststroke SB7	1 September
Bronze	Matthew Levy	Swimming	Men's 200 m individual medley SM7	2 September
Bronze	Andrew Pasterfield	Swimming	Men's 50 m freestyle S10	31 August
Bronze	Andrew Pasterfield	Swimming	Men's 100 m freestyle S10	6 September
Bronze	Rick Pendleton	Swimming	Men's 200 m individual medley SM10	30 August
Bronze	Ellie Cole	Swimming	Women's 400 m freestyle S9	4 September
Bronze	Ellie Cole	Swimming	Women's 50 m freestyle S9	5 September
Bronze	Prue Watt	Swimming	Women's 50 m freestyle S13	1 September
Bronze	Michael Anderson, Matthew Cowdrey, Brenden Hall, Matthew Levy (Final); Michael Auprince, Rick Pendleton, Andrew Pasterfield, Matthew Haanappel (Heat)	Swimming	Men's 4 x 100 m medley relay 34 points	8 September

== Events ==
=== Athletics ===
Athletics team Selected team of 43 athletes.

Men	Women
Nathan Arkley, Damien Bowen, Gabriel Cole, Matthew Cameron, Richard Colman, Kurt Fearnley, Sam Harding, Todd Hodgetts, Jake Lappin, Hamish MacDonald, Richard Nicholson, Evan O'Hanlon, Rheed McCracken, Sam McIntosh, Simon Patmore, Scott Reardon, Michael Roeger, Brad Scott, Russell Short, Matthew Silcocks, Tim Sullivan, Lindsay Sutton, Jack Swift	Angela Ballard, Carlee Beattie, Georgia Beikoff, Kelly Cartwright, Christie Dawes, Madison de Rozario, Rachael Dodds, Jodi Elkington, Louise Ellery, Michelle Errichiello, Jessica Gallagher, Madeleine Hogan, Torita Isaac, Rosemary Little, Brydee Moore, Katy Parrish, Kristy Pond, Kath Proudfoot, Stephanie Schweitzer, Erinn Walters

Support staff – Administration -Andrew Faichney (Section Manager), Don Elgin (Section Manager), Lynda Gusbeth (Section Manager), Stephanie Martin (Personal Care Assistant), Janet Rerden; Coaches – Steve Butler, Andrew Dawes, Iryna Dvoskina, John Eden, Aaron Holt, Brett Jones, Tim Matthews, Fred Periac, Brett Robinson, Louise Sauvage; Physiotherapists – Victoria Moore, Bernadette Petzel, Soft Tissue Therapist – Mick Jordan, Phil Power; Mechanic – Andrew Carter

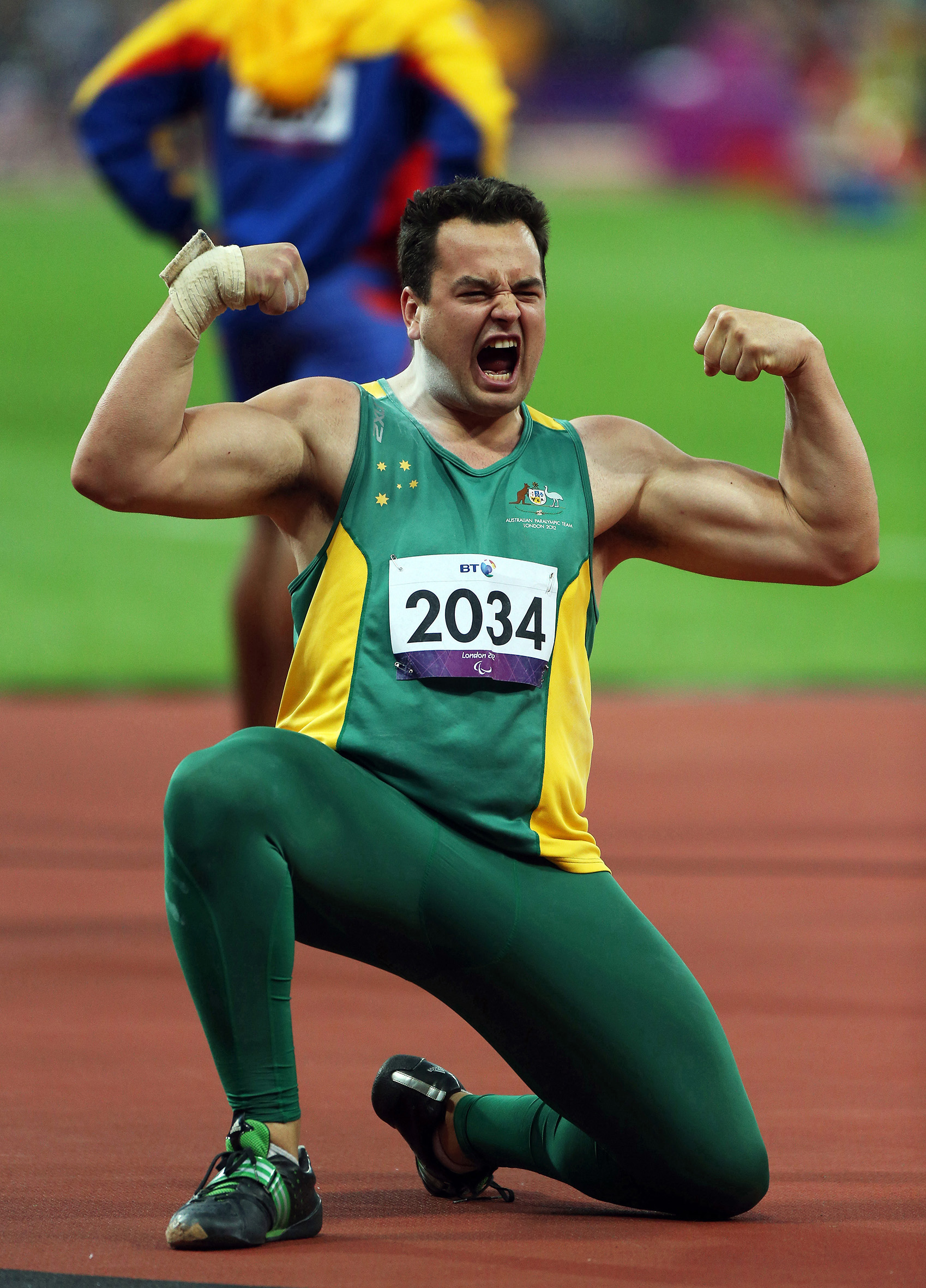
Hodgetts at the 2012 London Paralympics

Australia finished 10th on the athletics medal table winning 27 medals – 5 gold, 9 silver and 13 bronze. Gold medalists were – Evan O'Hanlon (gold), Richard Colman, Kelly Cartwright and Todd Hodgetts. Russell Short attended his 7th Games, Hamish MacDonald his 6th Games and Christine Dawes and Richard Nicholson their 5th Games.

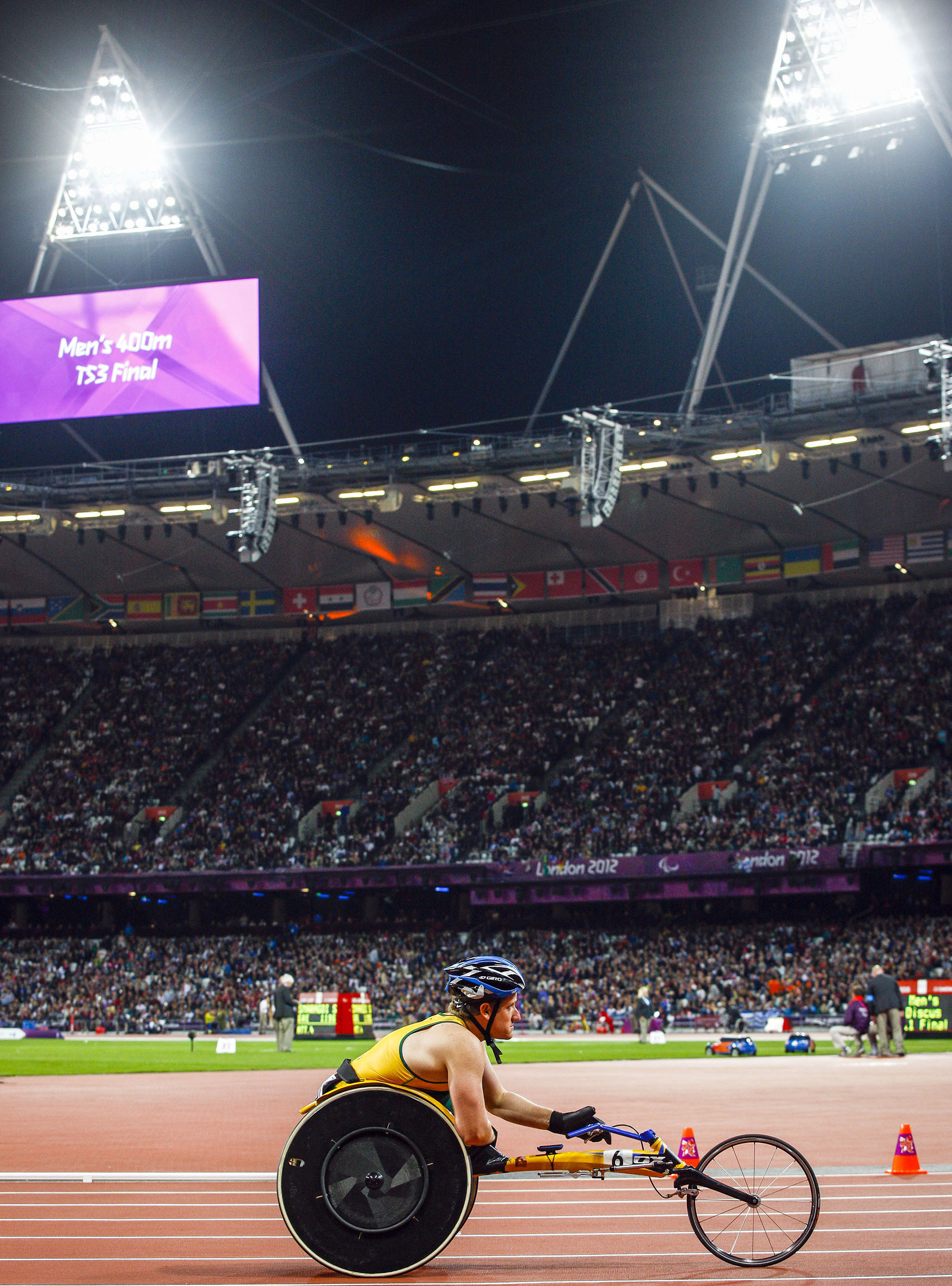
Colman at the 2012 London Paralympics

Results key

- Note–Ranks given for track events are within the athlete's heat only
- Q = Qualified for the next round
- WR = World record
- PR = Paralympic record
- OC = Oceania record
- N/A = Round not applicable for the event

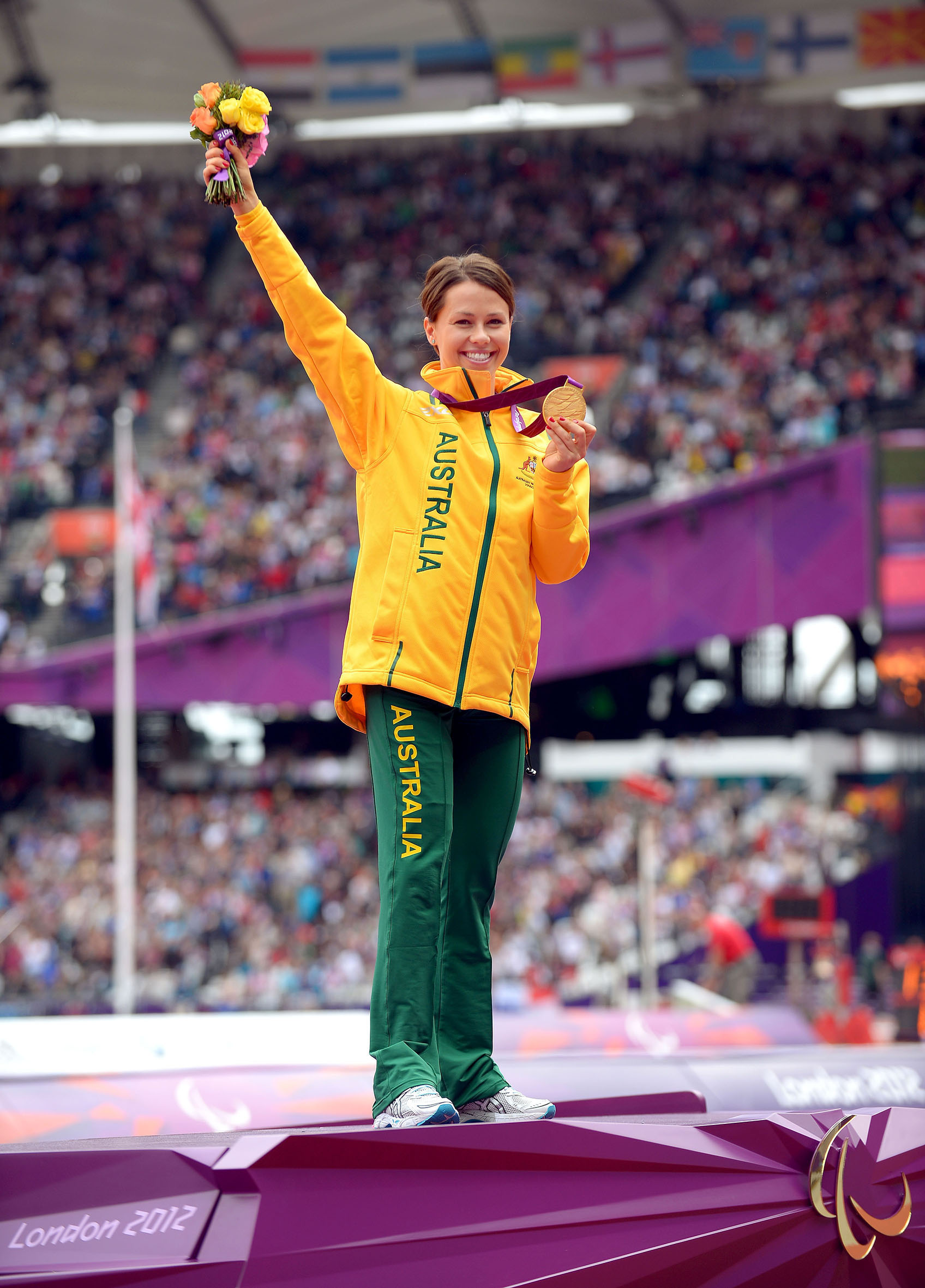
Gold medallist Kelly Cartwright

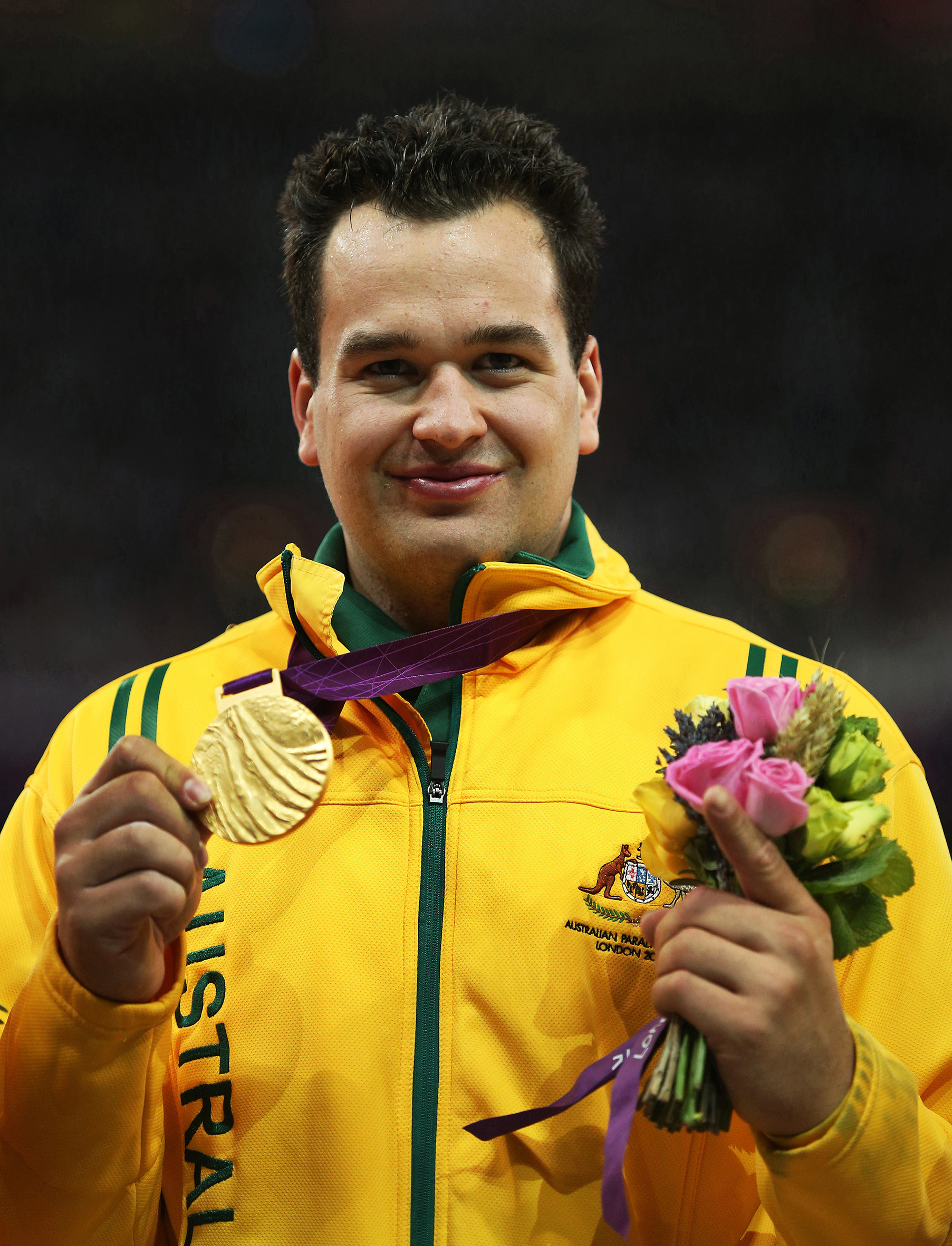
Gold medallist Todd Hodgetts

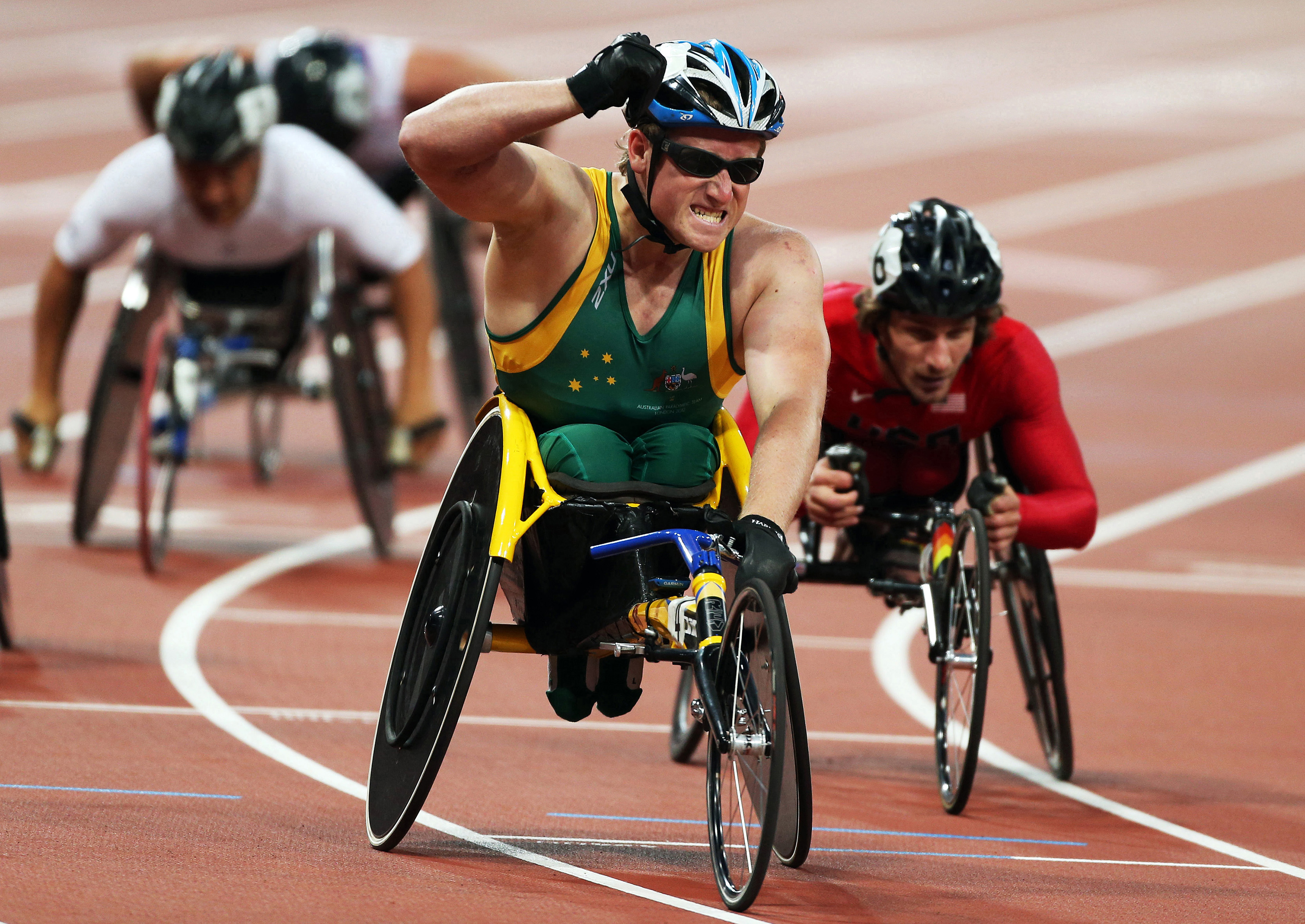
Gold medallist Richard Co9lman

==== Track events – men ====
Athlete	Events	Heat		Final	
Athlete	Events	Time	Rank	Time	Rank
Nathan Arkley	1500 m T54	11:33.18	22	Did not advance	
Nathan Arkley	Marathon T54	N/A		1:49.37	17
Matthew Cameron	100 m T54	14.51	10	Did not advance	
Gabriel Cole	100 m T46	17.82	20	Did not advance	
Richard Colman	200 m T53	26.75	8 Q	26.67 OC	7
Richard Colman	400 m T53	49.79	2 Q	50.24	3rd place, bronze medalist(s)
Richard Colman	800 m T53	1:41.86	1 Q	1:41.13	1st place, gold medalist(s)
Sam Harding	800 m T13	DNS		Did not advance	
Kurt Fearnley	800 m T54	1:38.62	8	Did not advance	
Kurt Fearnley	1500 m T54	3:19.18	15 Q	3:13.23	7
Kurt Fearnley	5000 m T54	10:56.58	2 Q	11:07.90	2nd place, silver medalist(s)
Kurt Fearnley	Marathon T54	N/A		1:30:21	3rd place, bronze medalist(s)
Jake Lappin	400 m T54	DSQ	-	Did not advance	
Jake Lappin	800 m T54	1:41.23	20	Did not advance	
Rheed McCracken	100 m T34	16.84 OC	5 Q	16.30 OC	2nd place, silver medalist(s)
Rheed McCracken	200 m T34	28.89 OC	2 Q	29.08	3rd place, bronze medalist(s)
Sam McIntosh	100 m T52	18.70	9	Did not advance	
Sam McIntosh	200 m T52	34.09 –1.4 SB	12	Did not advance	
Richard Nicholson	100 m T54	15.23	17		
Evan O'Hanlon	100 m T38	22.68	5 Q	10.79 WR	1st place, gold medalist(s)
Evan O'Hanlon	200 m T38	23.10	3 Q	21.82 WR	1st place, gold medalist(s)
Simon Patmore (T46)	200 m T46	22.68	5 Q	22.36	3rd place, bronze medalist(s)
Scott Reardon (T42)	100 m T42	12.45	2 Q	12.43 PB	2nd place, silver medalist(s)
Scott Reardon (T42)	200 m T42	N/A		26.03 PB	4
Michael Roeger	800 m T46	DNF	-	Did not advance	
Brad Scott	800 m T37	N/A		2:02.04 OC	3rd place, bronze medalist(s)
Brad Scott	1500 m T37	N/A		4:14.47'	2nd place, silver medalist(s)
Matthew Silcocks	800 m T46	1:58.51	9	Did not advance	
Matthew Silcocks	1500 m T46	4:05.48 Q	10 Q	3:59.79	6
Tim Sullivan	200 m T38	23.48	5 Q	23.57	5
Tim Sullivan	400 m T38	53.67	5 Q	52.39	5
Jack Swift	200 m T44	24.88	16	Did not advance	
Richard Nicholson; Nathan Arkley; Matthew Cameron; Richard Colman	4 x 400 m T53/54	3:17.28	4 Q	3:13.42	3rd place, bronze medalist(s)

==== Track events – women ====
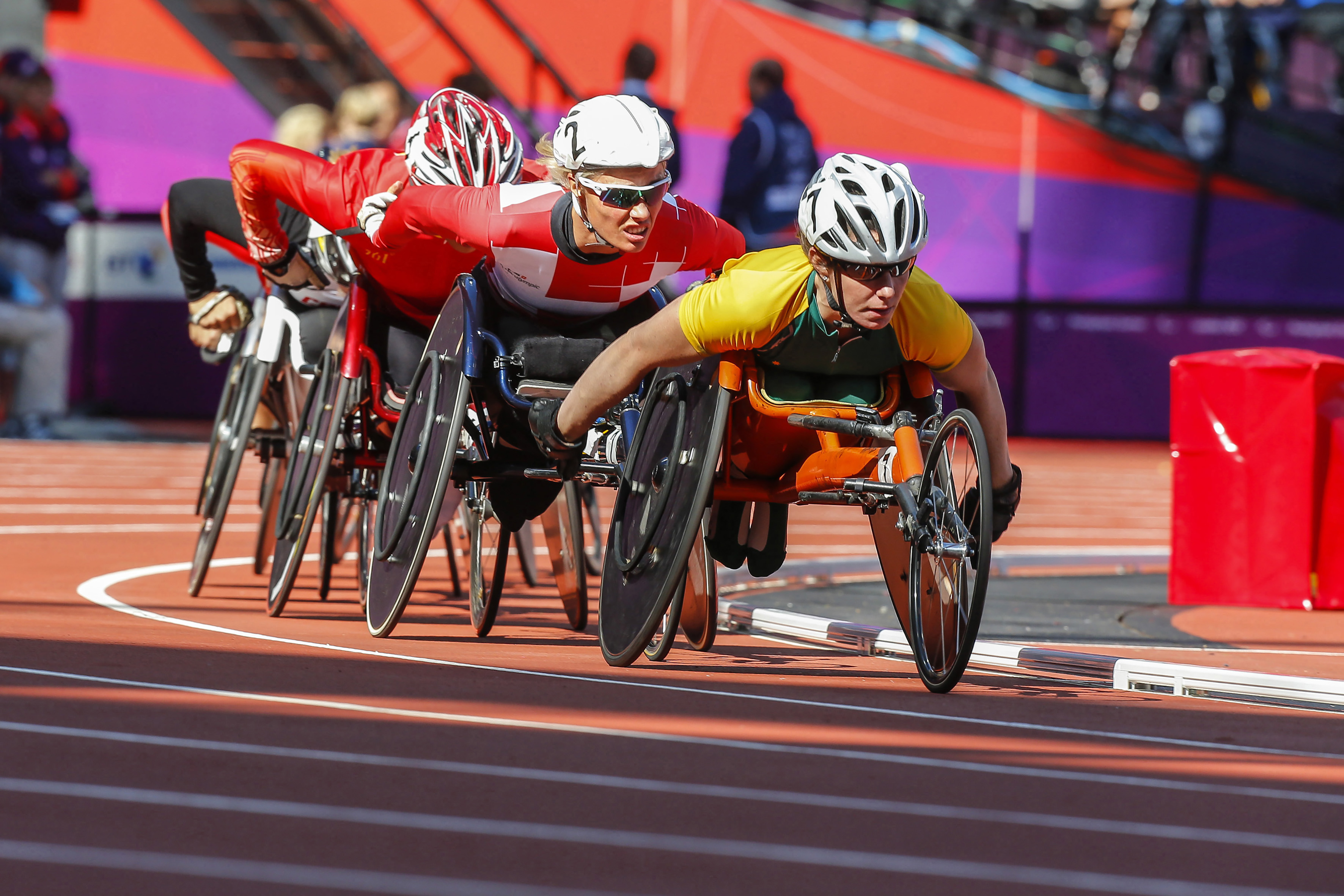
Dawes at the 2012 London Paralympics

Athlete	Events	Heat		Final	
Athlete	Events	Time	Rank	Time	Rank
Angela Ballard	100 m T53	N/A		17.14 OC	3rd place, bronze medalist(s)
Angela Ballard	200 m T53	N/A		29.35 PB	2nd place, silver medalist(s)
Angela Ballard	400 m T53	N/A		56.87	2nd place, silver medalist(s)
Angela Ballard	800 m T53	N/A		1:53.80	5
Carlee Beattie	100 m T46	13.16	6 Q	DNS	-
Kelly Cartwright	100 m T42	N/A		16.14,	2nd place, silver medalist(s)
Christie Dawes	800 m T54	1:56.14	Q	1:58.77	8
Christie Dawes	1500 m T54	3:43.36	11	Did not advance	
Christie Dawes	5000 m T54	12:51.77	5 Q	12:28.24	3rd place, bronze medalist(s)
Christie Dawes	5000 m T54	N/A		1:49.37	6
Madison de Rozario	100 m T53	N/A		17.60	5
Madison de Rozario	200 m T53	N/A		30.33	6
Madison de Rozario	400 m T53	N/A		58.42	6
Madison de Rozario	800 m T53	N/A		1:53.65	4
Rachael Dodds	100 m T35	N/A		17.03	5
Rachael Dodds	200 m T35	N/A		36.75	7
Jodi Elkington	400 m T37	1:11.12 Q	6	1:11.49	6
Michelle Errichiello	100 m T42	N/A		17.20	5
Torita Isaac	100 m T38	14.67	8 Q	14.50 PB	7
Torita Isaac	200 m T38	29.36 PB	7 Q	29.78	7
Rosemary Little	100 m T34	20.65	4 Q	19.95 OC	3rd place, bronze medalist(s)
Rosemary Little	200 m T34	34.69	2	35.08	4
Katy Parrish	100 m T38	14.75 '	9	Did not advance	
Katy Parrish	200 m T38	30.94	9	Did not advance	
Kristy Pond	100 m T34	24.58	11	Did not advance	
Kristy Pond	200 m T34	AUS 43.92	11	Did not advance	
Erinn Walters	100 m T35	N/A		18.09	8
Erinn Walters	200 m T35	N/A		36.31	6

==== Field events – women ====
Athlete	Events	Result	Rank
Carlee Beattie	Long jump F46	5.57 m	2nd place, silver medalist(s)
Georgia Beikoff (F37)	Javelin throw F37/38	914pts (29.84 m)	3rd place, bronze medalist(s)
Kelly Cartwright	Long jump F42/44	1030pts (4.38 m −0.5)	1st place, gold medalist(s)
Louise Ellery	Club throw F31/32/51	818pts (15.24 m)	8
Louise Ellery	Shot put F32-34	5.90 m PR	2nd place, silver medalist(s)
Jessica Gallagher (F13)	Javelin throw F12/13	882pts (33.50 m)	6
Jessica Gallagher (F13)	Long jump F13	5.03 m	5
Madeleine Hogan	Javelin throw F46	38.85 m PB	3rd place, bronze medalist(s)
Brydee Moore (F33)	Javelin throw F33/34/52/53	585pts (10.55 m)	10
Brydee Moore (F33)	Shot put F32-34	6.05 m	6
Katy Parrish	Long jump F37/38	3.81 m +0.8	11
Kath Proudfoot (F36)	Discus throw F35/36	956pts (25.22 m)	3rd place, bronze medalist(s)
Kath Proudfoot (F36)	Shot put F35/36	984pts (9.76 m)	4
Stephanie Schweitzer	Long jump F20	4.79 m	4

==== Field events – men ====
Athlete	Events	Result	Rank
Damien Bowen (F34)	Javelin throw F33/34	35.72 m OC	6
Damien Bowen (F34)	Shot put F34	10.21 m	12
Todd Hodgetts	Shot put F20	16.29 m WR	1st place, gold medalist(s)
Hamish MacDonald	Shot put F34	10.34 m	11
Russell Short	Shot put F11–12	950 pts (14.73 m) SB	3rd place, bronze medalist(s)

=== Cycling ===
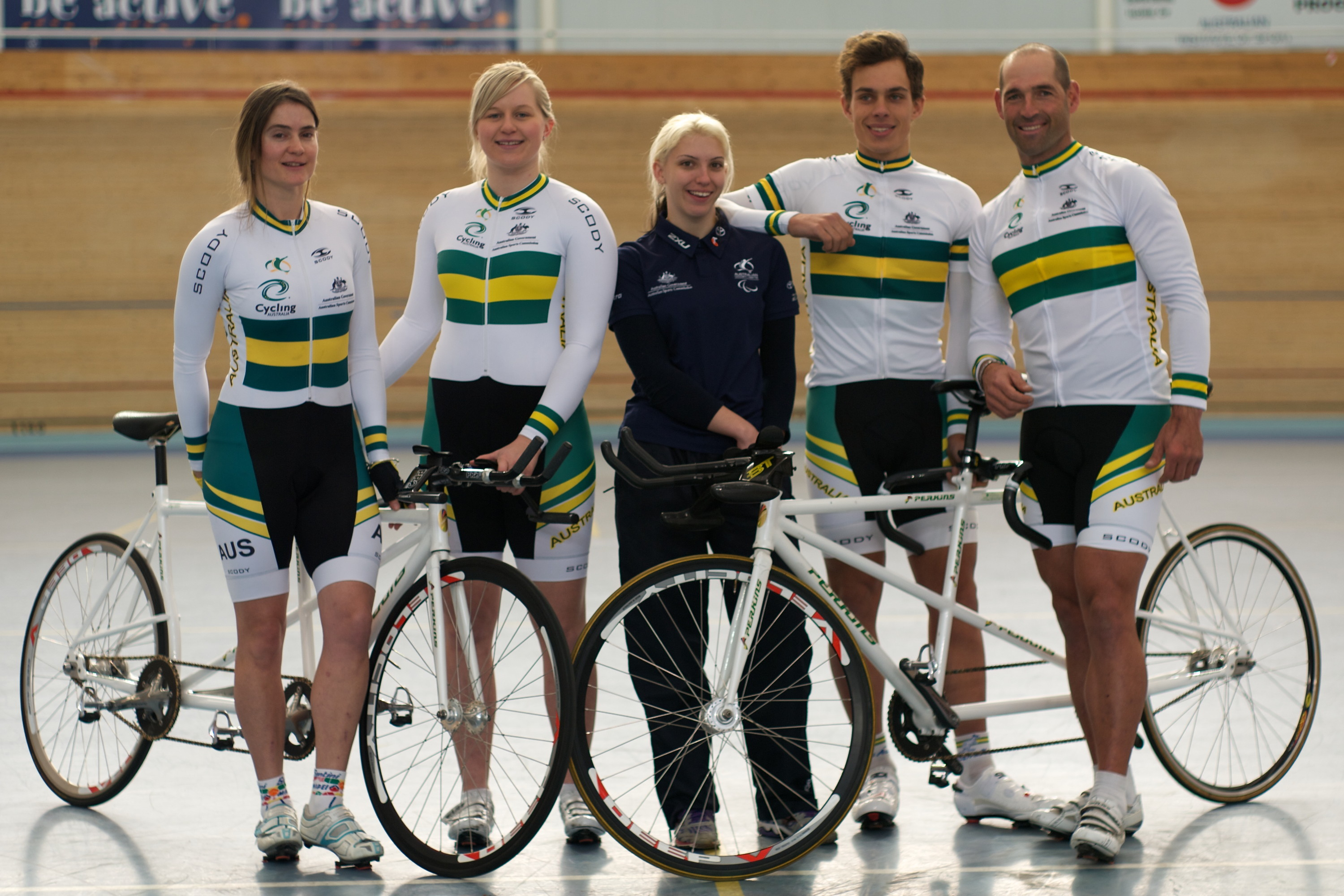
Members of the Australian Paralympic cycling team for 2012 at the team's announcement in Adelaide, South Australia. From left to right: Felicity Johnson and her pilot, Stephanie Morton; Jayme Paris; Scott McPhee and Kieran Modra (McPhee piloted for Modra).

Selected team of 15 athletes. Kieran Modra was attending his 7th Games.

Athlete	Event	Qualification time	Rank	Final time	Rank
Nigel Barley	Men's road race H1-3	N/A		1:58:03	4
Nigel Barley	Men's time trial H1-3	N/A		26.18.34	2nd place, silver medalist(s)
Carol Cooke	Women's road race T2	N/A		51.22	7
Carol Cooke	Women's time trial T1-2	N/A		13:50.54	1st place, gold medalist(s)
Carol Cooke	Mixed individual road race T1-2	N/A		51.22	7
Michael Gallagher	Men's road race C4-5	N/A		1:56.06	9
Michael Gallagher	Men's time trial C5	N/A		33:12.03	3rd place, bronze medalist(s)
Michael Gallagher	Men's individual pursuit C5	4:30.012 Q WR	1	4:35.297	1st place, gold medalist(s)
Michael Gallagher	Mixed C1-5 team sprint	55.347	5	Did not advance	
Alexandra Green (C4)	Women's road race C4-5	N/A		DNF	-
Alexandra Green (C4)	Women's time trial C4	N/A		27:43.57	4
Alexandra Green (C4)	Women's individual pursuit C4	4:07.152 Q	3	4:07.921	3rd place, bronze medalist(s)
Alexandra Green (C4)	Women's individual 500 m C4	N/A		42.095	8
Felicity Johnson; Stephanie Morton (pilot)	Women's individual pursuit B1-3	3:51.103	9	Did not advance	
Felicity Johnson; Stephanie Morton (pilot)	Women's individual 1 km B1-3	N/A		1:08.919 PR	1st place, gold medalist(s)
Simone Kennedy (C3)	Women's road race C1-3	N/A		1:52:32	6
Simone Kennedy (C3)	Women's time trial C3	N/A		33:39.02	9
Simone Kennedy (C3)	Women's individual pursuit C1–3	4:23.450 Q	2	4:24.893	2nd place, silver medalist(s)
Simone Kennedy (C3)	Women's individual 500 m C3	N/A		43.892	6
Bryce Lindores; Sean Finning (pilot)	Men's road race B1-3	N/A		2:28:48	7
Bryce Lindores; Sean Finning (pilot)	Men's road time trial B1	N/A		33.12.27	13
Bryce Lindores; Sean Finning (pilot)	Men's individual pursuit B1-3	4:21.219 Q	2	4:22.269	2nd place, silver medalist(s)
Bryce Lindores; Sean Finning (pilot)	Men's individual 1 km B1-3	N/A		1:03.896	5
Kieran Modra; Scott McPhee (pilot)	Men's road race B1-3	N/A		DNF	-
Kieran Modra; Scott McPhee (pilot)	Men's road time trial B1	N/A		DNF	-
Kieran Modra; Scott McPhee (pilot)	Men's individual pursuit B1-3	4:18.752 Q	1	4:17.756 WR	1st place, gold medalist(s)
Kieran Modra; Scott McPhee (pilot)	Men's individual 1 km B1-3	N/A		1:03.120	4
David Nicholas (C3)	Men's road race C1-3	N/A		AUS 1:42.51	3rd place, bronze medalist(s)
David Nicholas (C3)	Men's road time trial C3	N/A		23:22.13	1st place, gold medalist(s)
David Nicholas (C3)	Men's individual pursuit C1-3	3.36.757 Q	3	3:38.800	4
David Nicholas (C3)	Men's individual 1 km C1-3	N/A		1:13.087	15
David Nicholas (C3)	Mixed C1-5 team sprint	55.347	5	Did not advance	
Jayme Paris (C1)	Women's road race C1-3	N/A		DNF	-
Jayme Paris (C1)	Women's road time trial C1	N/A		30:52.13	7
Jayme Paris (C1)	Women's individual pursuit C1	4:30.507 WR	8	Did not advance	
Jayme Paris (C1)	Women's individual 500 m C1	N/A		40.476 WR	3rd place, bronze medalist(s)
Susan Powell (C4)	Women's road race C4-5	N/A		1:56:12	9
Susan Powell (C4)	Women's road time trial C4	N/A		26:31.30	2nd place, silver medalist(s)
Susan Powell (C4)	Women's individual pursuit C4	4:03.306 WR Q	1	4:05.200	1st place, gold medalist(s)
Susan Powell (C4)	Women's individual 500 m C4	N/A		39.702	6
Susan Powell (C4)	Mixed C1-5 team sprint	55.347	5	Did not advance	
Stuart Tripp	Men's road race H4-5	N/A		2:00:35	8
Stuart Tripp	Men's road time trial H4	N/A		27:47.62	9

Support staff – Administration – Murray Lydeamore (Section Manager); Coaches – Peter Day (Head), Jenni Banks, Paul Martens, Tom Skulander; Mechanic – Peter Giessauf, Mike Winter; Physiotherapist – Anouska Edwards, Soft tissue therapist – Alan Downes

=== Equestrian ===
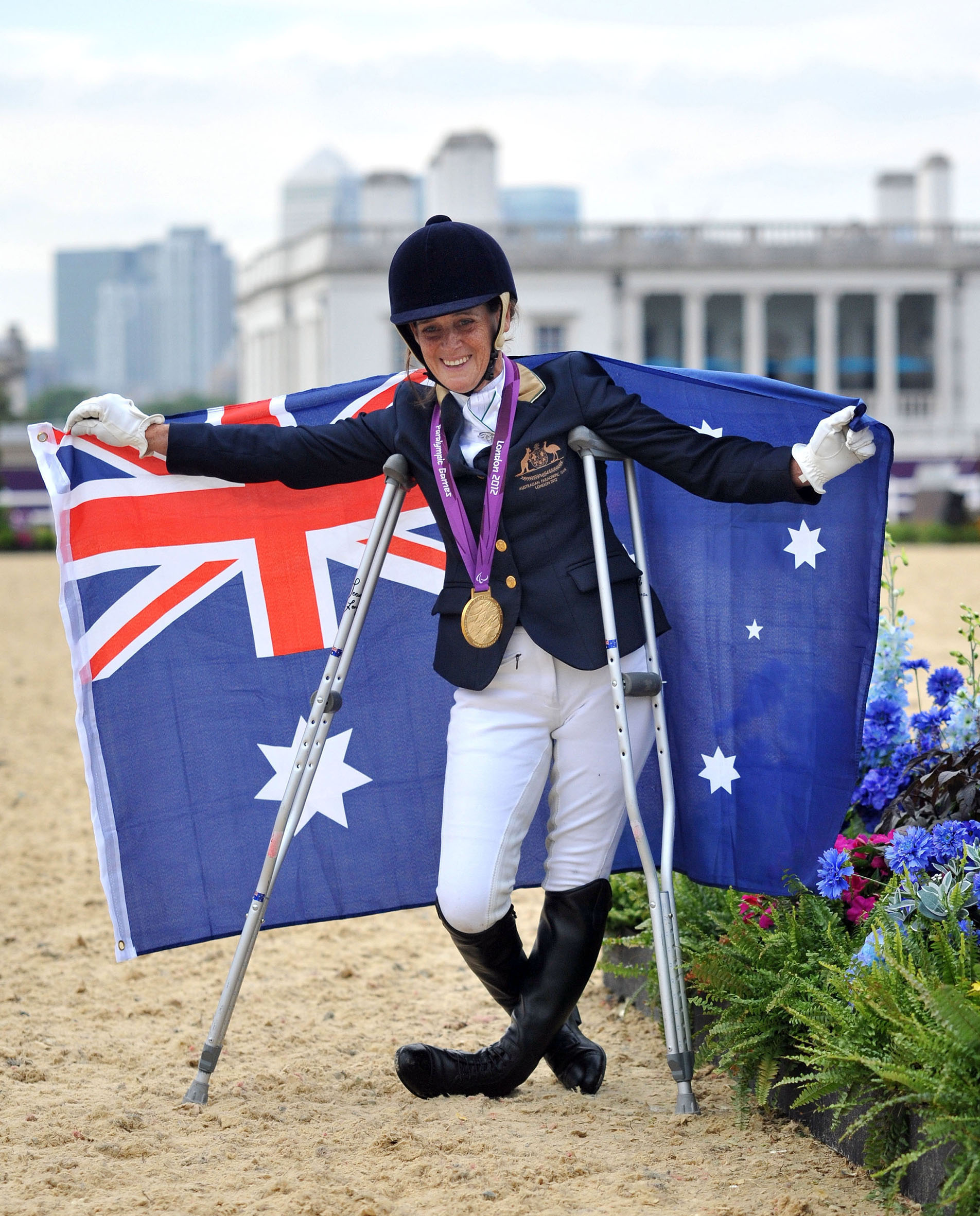
Formosa wearing her gold medal at the 2012 London Paralympics

Selected team of 4 athletes.

Athlete	Horse	Event	Total	
Athlete	Horse	Event	Score	Rank
Grace Bowman	Kirby Park Joy	Individual championship test grade II	EL	
Grace Bowman	Kirby Park Joy	Dressage individual team test grade II	57.048	21
Hannah Dodd	Waikiwi	Individual championship test grade IV	65.161	12
Hannah Dodd	Waikiwi	Dressage individual team test grade IV	66.156	11
Joann Formosa	Worldwide PB	Individual championship test grade Ib	75.826	1st place, gold medalist(s)
Joann Formosa	Worldwide PB	Dressage individual team test grade Ib	71.955	3
Rob Oakley	Stratford Montopvani	Individual championship test grade Ia	67.300	12
Rob Oakley	Stratford Montopvani	Dressage individual team test grade Ib	57.588	14

Support staff – Administration – Sally Francis (Section Manager); Coach – Julia Battams (Head); Physioptherapist – Victoria Kahn; Grooms – Elsa Davis, Nicole King, Fay Mendez, Kate O'Brien; Veterinarian – Janine Dwyer
m
Three athletes attended Games for the first time. Australia won its first gold medal since the 2000 Sydney Games with Joann Formosa's medal.

=== Goalball ===
==== Women's tournament ====
Selected Australian women's team of 6 athletes

Australian women's team
Jennifer Blow, Meica Christensen (Captain), Tyan Taylor, Nicole Esdaile, Rachel Henderson, Michelle Rzepecki; Head Coach – Georgina Kenaghan.

Support staff – Administration – Peter Corr (Section Manager); Coach – Georgina Kenaghan; Physiothyerapist – Eliza Kwan

The team went into the Games ranked eight in the world and is the first Australian goalball team to qualify for the Paralympic sport since Atlanta in 1996. It competed in Group B against China, United States, Sweden, Japan and Canada. The Australian men's team did not qualify after losing the Africa Oceania Goalball Regional Championships 5–4 against Algeria.

Group play

Team	Pld	W	D	L	GF	GA	GD	Pts	Qualification
Canada	4	3	0	1	6	3	+3	9	Quarterfinals
Japan	4	2	1	1	5	3	+2	7	Quarterfinals
Sweden	4	2	1	1	11	11	0	7	Quarterfinals
United States	4	2	0	2	9	4	+5	6	Quarterfinals
Australia	4	0	0	4	7	17	−10	0	Eliminated

Source: "London 2012 Paralympic Games - Goalball results" (PDF). Paralympic.org. 3 October 2012 – via Goalball.sport.

31 August 2012; 09:00	Australia	1 – 3	Japan	Copper Box, London; Referees: Hooshang Shariati (IRI), Yasser Omar (EGY)
31 August 2012; 09:00	Esdaile 1	Report	Adacho 2 Komiya 1	Copper Box, London; Referees: Hooshang Shariati (IRI), Yasser Omar (EGY)

2 September 2012; 10:15	Australia	1 – 3	Canada	Copper Box, London; Referees: Juha Vuokila (FIN), Dina Murdie (GBR)
2 September 2012; 10:15	Christensen 1	Report	Kneebone 2 Morin 1	Copper Box, London; Referees: Juha Vuokila (FIN), Dina Murdie (GBR)

3 September 2012; 18:30	United States	3 – 0	Australia	Copper Box, London; Referees: Thomas Baerz (GER), Bulent Kimyon (TUR)
3 September 2012; 18:30	Armbruster 3	Report		Copper Box, London; Referees: Thomas Baerz (GER), Bulent Kimyon (TUR)

4 September 2012; 12:30	Sweden	8 – 5	Australia	Copper Box, London; Referees: Hooshang Shariati (IRI), Janne Ahokas (FIN)
4 September 2012; 12:30	Gustavsson 5 Naesström 2 Jälmestål 1	Report	Esdaile 3 Christensen 2	Copper Box, London; Referees: Hooshang Shariati (IRI), Janne Ahokas (FIN)

=== Powerlifting ===
Selected team of 2 athletes.
Men – Darren Gardiner and Abebe Fekadu.
Support staff – Administration – Scott Upston (Section Manager); Coach – Ray Epstein

Gardiner, a previous Games medallist, competed at his fourth Games and Fekadu and a refugee from Ethiopia competed at his second Games. Australia did not win any medals.

Athlete	Event	Total lifted	Rank
Abebe Fekadu	Men's 56 kg	158 kg	8
Darren Gardiner	Men's +100 kg	231 kg	4

=== Rowing ===
Single scull – Erik Horrie
Pair – Gavin Bellis, Kathryn Ross
Support staff – Administration – Dean Oakman (Section Manager); Coach – Chad King (Head); Boat Technician – Urs Graf; Physiotherapist – Erin Smyth

Australia won a silver medal through Erik Horrie.

Athlete(s)	Event	Heats		Repechage		Final	
Athlete(s)	Event	Time	Rank	Time	Rank	Time	Rank
Erik Horrie	Men's single sculls	4:52.75	3 R	4:56.75	1 FA	4:55.85	2nd place, silver medalist(s)
Gavin Bellis; Kathryn Ross	Mixed double sculls	4:05.10	3 R	4:06.19	2 FA	4:06.17	5

Qualification Legend: FA=Final A (medal); FB=Final B (non-medal); R=Repechage

=== Sailing ===
Selected team of 6 athletes

Australian team
Matthew Bugg (Single person 2.4mR), Daniel Fitzgibbon and Liesl Tesch (Two person Skud 18), Colin Harrison, Stephen Churm, Jonathan Harris (Three person Sonar)

Support staff – Administration – Sarah Karsten (Section Manager), Peter Conde (Support staff); Coaches – Grant Alderson, Tim Lowe, Richard Scarr; Physiotherapist – Sarah Ross, Technical Support – Adrian Finglas, Boat Technician – Jeffery Milligan; Personal Care Attendant – Kumi Sasaki

Lisel Tesch attendedg her sixth Games but the first as sailor. She previously captained Australian women's wheelchair basketball team to medals at previous Games. Tesch won her first Paralympic gold medal in combination with Daniel Fitzgibbon to win Two Person Keelboat.

Athlete	Event	Race											Net points	Rank
Athlete	Event	1	2	3	4	5	6	7	8	9	10	11	Net points	Rank
Matthew Bugg	Single person 2.4mR	8	4	6	8	7	5	7	7	7	(17); DNS	C	56	7
Daniel Fitzgibbon, Liesl Tesch	SKUD 18 2 person keelboat	1	2	2	(3)	2	1	2	1	1	2	C	14	1st place, gold medalist(s)
Colin Harrison, Stephen Churm, Jonathan Harris	Sonar 3 person keelboat	1	3	(15); DSQ	2	8	9	7	3	6	9	C	47	6

=== Shooting ===
Selected team of 6 athletes.

Men	Women
Ashley Adams, Luke Cain, Jason Maroney, Bradley Mark; Head Coach – Miro Sipek.	Libby Kosmala, Natalie Smith

Support staff – Admionistration – Nick Sullivan (Section Manager); Coach – Miro Sipek; Technical Support – Stuart Smith; Personal Care Attendant – Anne Bugden, Yvonne Cain, Margaret Zubcic

Libby Kosmala competed at her 11th Paralympic Games at the age of 70. Ashley Adams competed at his 4th Games. Australia won one bronze medal through Natalie Smith.

Athlete	Event	Qualification		Final	
Athlete	Event	Score	Rank	Score	Rank
Ashley Adams	Men's 10 m air rifle standing SH1	583	15	Did not advance	
Ashley Adams	Mixed R3-10 m air rifle prone SH1	598	16	Did not advance	
Ashley Adams	Men's 50 m air rifle 3 positions SH1	1127	10	Did not advance	
Ashley Adams	Mixed 50 m air rifle prone SH1	583	20	Did not advance	
Luke Cain	Mixed 10 m air rifle standing SH2	586	27	Did not advance	
Luke Cain	Mixed 10 m air rifle prone SH2	594	28	Did not advance	
Libby Kosmala	Women's 10 m air rifle standing SH1	391	8 Q	488.7	8
Libby Kosmala	Mixed R3-10 m air rifle prone SH1	597	24	Did not advance	
Bradley Mark	Mixed 10 m air rifle standing SH2	598	9	Did not advance	
Bradley Mark	Mixed 10 m air rifle prone SH2	600	10	Did not advance	
Jason Maroney	Mixed 10 m air rifle standing SH2	598	7 Q	702.6	7
Jason Maroney	Mixed 10 m air rifle prone SH2	594	27	Did not advance	
Natalie Smith	Women's 10 m air rifle standing SH1	392	4 Q	492.4	3rd place, bronze medalist(s)
Natalie Smith	Mixed R3-10 m air rifle prone SH1	597	22	Did not advance	

=== Swimming ===
Selected team of 35 athletes.

Men	Women
Michael Anderson, Tim Antalfy, Michael Auprince, Blake Cochrane, Matthew Cowdrey, Jay Dohnt, Richard Eliason, Daniel Fox, Matthew Haanappel, Brenden Hall, Ahmed Kelly, Mitchell Kilduff, Matthew Levy, Jeremy McClure, Andrew Pasterfield, Grant Patterson, Rick Pendleton, Aaron Rhind, Sean Russo, Reagan Wickens	Kayla Clarke, Ellie Cole, Taylor Corry, Katherine Downie, Maddison Elliott, Amanda Fowler, Jacqueline Freney, Tanya Huebner, Kara Leo, Esther Overton, Katrina Porter, Sarah Rose, Teigan Van Roosmalen, Prue Watt, Annabelle Williams

==== Men's events ====
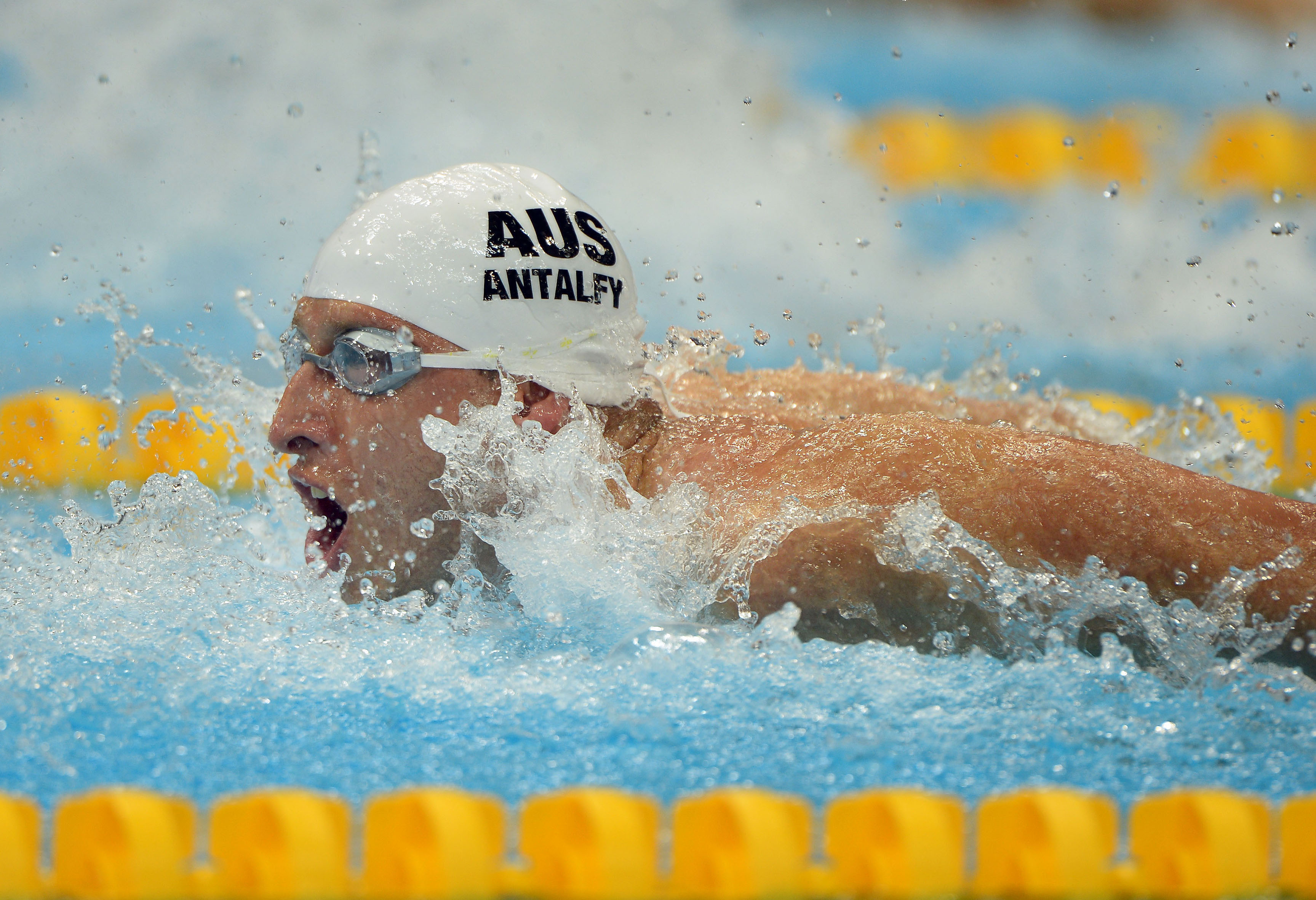
Antalfy at the 2012 London Paralympics

Athlete	Events	Heats		Final	
Athlete	Events	Time	Rank	Time	Rank
Michael Anderson	50 m freestyle S10	0:25.32	11	Did not advance	
Michael Anderson	100 m backstroke S10	1:01.21 OC	2 Q	1:01.40	5
Michael Anderson	100 m freestyle S10	0:54.70	6 Q	0:54.73	8
Timothy Antalfy	50 m freestyle S13	24.33 OC	2 Q	24.26 OC	4
Timothy Antalfy	100 m backstroke S13	1:04.26	5 Q	1:04.03	5
Timothy Antalfy	100 m butterfly S13	0:56.03 PR	1 Q	0:56.48	3rd place, bronze medalist(s)
Timothy Antalfy	100 m freestyle S13	0:53.37	3 Q	0:53.63	4
Michael Auprince	50 m freestyle S9	0:27.24	11	Did not advance	
Michael Auprince	100 m backstroke S9	1:03.86	1 Q	1:03.98	4
Michael Auprince	100 m butterfly S9	1:05.33	14	Did not advance	
Michael Auprince	100 m freestyle S9	0:58.94	10	Did not advance	
Michael Auprince	200 m individual medley SM9	2:26.36	10	Did not advance	
Blake Cochrane	50 m freestyle S8	0:27.81	=7 Q	0:27.64	6
Blake Cochrane	100 m breaststroke SB7	1:20.76 PR	1 Q	1:18.77 WR	1st place, gold medalist(s)
Blake Cochrane	100 m freestyle S8	1:01.72	7 Q	1:01.07	8
Blake Cochrane	200 m individual medley SM8	2:35.33	8 Q	2:33.66	7
Matthew Cowdrey	50 m freestyle S9	0:25.63	1 Q	25.13 WR	1st place, gold medalist(s)
Matthew Cowdrey	100 m backstroke S9	1:05.47	7 Q	1:02.39 PR	1st place, gold medalist(s)
Matthew Cowdrey	100 m breaststroke SB8	1:11.53	3 Q	1:09.88 OC	2nd place, silver medalist(s)
Matthew Cowdrey	100 m butterfly S9	1:02.31	5 Q	0:59.91	2nd place, silver medalist(s)
Matthew Cowdrey	100 m freestyle S9	0:56.58	1 Q	55.84	1st place, gold medalist(s)
Matthew Cowdrey	200 m individual medley SM9	2:19.79	1 Q	2:15.95	1st place, gold medalist(s)
Jay Dohnt	100 m breaststroke SB6	1:32.79	8 Q	1:33.53	7
Jay Dohnt	200 m individual medley SM7	2:54.18	10	Did not advance	
Jay Dohnt	400 m freestyle S7	5:22.30	14	Did not advance	
Richard Eliason	100 m breaststroke SB14	1:09.92	4 Q	1:09.96	5
Daniel Fox	100 m backstroke S14	1:05.58	5 Q	1:05.76	4
Daniel Fox	200 m freestyle S14	2:00.11	1 Q	1:59.79 OC	2nd place, silver medalist(s)
Matthew Haanappel	50 m butterfly S6	0:38.69	12	Did not advance	
Matthew Haanappel	50 m freestyle S6	0:32.58 OC	7 Q	0:32.13 OC	6
Matthew Haanappel	100 m backstroke S6	1:24.02 OC	5 Q	1:21.25 OC	5
Matthew Haanappel	100 m freestyle S6	1:10.95 OC	4 Q	1:09.88	5
Matthew Haanappel	200 m individual medley SM6	2:57.27 OC	6 Q	2:55.60 OC	7
Brenden Hall	50 m freestyle S9	0:27.27	12	Did not advance	
Brenden Hall	100 m backstroke S9	1:06.33	11	Did not advance	
Brenden Hall	100 m butterfly S9	1:01.82	4 Q	1:01.31	6
Brenden Hall	100 m freestyle S9	0:57.45	3 Q	0:57.29	5
Brenden Hall	200 m individual medley SM9	2:23.42	6 Q	2:21.48	6
Brenden Hall	400 m freestyle S9	4:21.69	1 Q	4:10.88 WR	1st place, gold medalist(s)
Ahmed Kelly	50 m backstroke S4	0:57.91	10	Did not advance	
Ahmed Kelly	50 m breaststroke SB3	0:51.86	4 Q	0:52.54	4
Ahmed Kelly	100 m freestyle S4	2:10.72	16	Did not advance	
Ahmed Kelly	150 m individual medley SM4	3:08.32	10	Did not advance	
Mitchell Kilduff	100 m backstroke S14	1:08.49	14	Did not advance	
Mitchell Kilduff	100 m breaststroke SB14	1:19.16	16Q	Did not advance	
Mitchell Kilduff	200 m freestyle S14	2:04.64	8 Q	2:01.09	5
Matthew Levy	50 m freestyle S7	0:28.63 OC	3 Q	0:28.58 OC	4
Matthew Levy	50 m butterfly S7	0:31.68 OC	2 Q	0:31.54 OC	4
Matthew Levy	100 m breaststroke SB7	1:23.09	3 Q	1:22.62	3rd place, bronze medalist(s)
Matthew Levy	100 m freestyle S7	1:02.87	3 Q	1:01.38 OC	2nd place, silver medalist(s)
Matthew Levy	200 m individual medley SM7	2:37.69 OC	2 Q	2:37.18 OC	3rd place, bronze medalist(s)
Matthew Levy	400 m freestyle S7	4:57.68	6 Q	4:58.12	7
Jeremy McClure	50 m freestyle S12	0:28.77	17	Did not advance	
Jeremy McClure	100 m backstroke S12	1:07.17	8 Q	1:07.11	4
Jeremy McClure	100 m breaststroke SB12	1:24.19	14	Did not advance	
Andrew Pasterfield	50 m freestyle S10	0:24.14 OC	4 Q	0:23.89 OC	3rd place, bronze medalist(s)
Andrew Pasterfield	100 m backstroke S10	1:02.94	6 Q	1:02.84	7
Andrew Pasterfield	100 m butterfly S10	0:59.47	7 Q	0:59.49	7
Andrew Pasterfield	100 m freestyle S10	0:53.01	1 Q	0:52.77	3rd place, bronze medalist(s)
Grant Patterson	50 m backstroke S3	0:58.87	9	Did not advance	
Grant Patterson	50 m breaststroke SB2	1:05.86	8 Q	1:07.52	8
Grant Patterson	50 m freestyle S4	0:55.49	14	Did not advance	
Grant Patterson	100 m freestyle S4	1:54.53	14	Did not advance	
Grant Patterson	150 m individual medley SM3	3:10.73	6 Q	3:08.66 OC	6
Rick Pendleton	50 m freestyle S10	0:26.26	17	Did not advance	
Rick Pendleton	100 m breaststroke SB9	1:11.94	6 Q	1:10.96	5
Rick Pendleton	100 m butterfly S10	1:01.30	14	Did not advance	
Rick Pendleton	100 m freestyle S10	0:56.62	15	Did not advance	
Rick Pendleton	200 m individual medley SM10	2:17.17	4 Q	2:14.77	3rd place, bronze medalist(s)
Aaron Rhind	50 m butterfly S6	0:34.29	8 Q	34.03 OC	7
Aaron Rhind	50 m freestyle S6	0:34.64	14	Did not advance	
Aaron Rhind	100 m backstroke S6	1:25.36	8 Q	1:29.28	8
Aaron Rhind	100 m freestyle S6	1:14.48	12	Did not advance	
Aaron Rhind	200 m individual medley SM6	2:59.01	9	Did not advance	
Sean Russo	50 m freestyle S13	25.48	11	Did not advance	
Sean Russo	100 m backstroke S13	1:01.98 OC	4 Q	1:02.59	4
Sean Russo	100 m breaststroke SB13	1:16.81	9	Did not advance	
Sean Russo	100 m butterfly S13	1:01.24	8 Q	1:01.57	8
Sean Russo	100 m freestyle S13	0:55.97	13	Did not advance	
Sean Russo	200 m individual medley SM13	2:18.46 OC	7 Q	2:17.80 OC	8
Sean Russo	400 m freestyle S13	4:22.83	6 Q	4:18.25	6
Reagan Wickens	50 m butterfly S6	0:35.46	10	Did not advance	
Reagan Wickens	50 m freestyle S6	0:37.19	16	Did not advance	
Reagan Wickens	100 m backstroke S6	1:32.94	10	Did not advance	
Reagan Wickens	100 m freestyle S6	1:17.15	15	Did not advance	
Reagan Wickens	200 m individual medley SM6	3:11.87	=14	Did not advance	
Reagan Wickens	400 m freestyle S6	5:28.56 OC	4	5:26.67 OC	4
Heats: Brenden Hall; Michael Auprince; Michael Anderson; Matthew Haanappel; Finals: Andrew Pasterfield; Matthew Levy; Blake Cochrane; Matthew Cowdrey	4x100 m freestyle relay 34 pts	4:00.91	4 Q	3:50.17 PR	1st place, gold medalist(s)
Heats: Michael Auprince; Rick Pendleton; Andrew Pasterfield; Matthew Haanappel Finals: Michael Anderson; Matthew Cowdrey; Brenden Hall; Matthew Levy	4x100 m medley relay 34 pts	4:24.70	3 Q	4:14.97	3rd place, bronze medalist(s)

Legend: Q= Qualified for final; OC= Oceania Record; PR= Paralympic Record; WR= World Record

==== Women's events ====
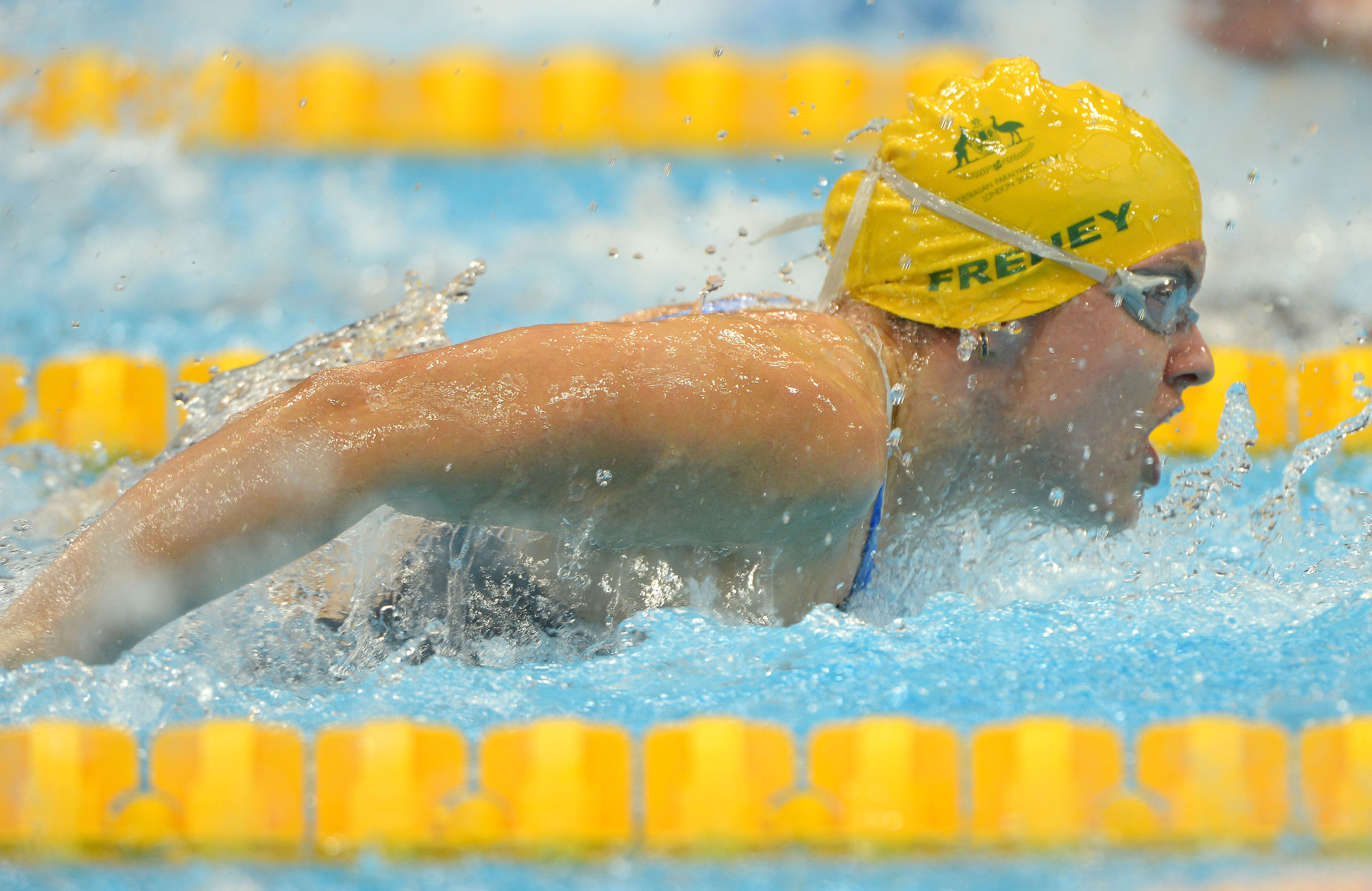
Jacqueline Freney at the 2012 London Paralympics

Athlete	Events	Heats		Final	
Athlete	Events	Time	Rank	Time	Rank
Kayla Clarke	100 m backstroke S14	1:11.29	5 Q	1:11.04	6
Kayla Clarke	100 m breaststroke SB14	1:23.36	4 Q	1:22.87	4
Kayla Clarke	200 m freestyle S14	2:16.52	6 Q	2:15.29	4
Ellie Cole	50 m freestyle S9	0:29.75	4 Q	0:29.28 OC	3rd place, bronze medalist(s)
Ellie Cole	100 m backstroke S9	1:10.74	1 Q	1:09.42 OC	1st place, gold medalist(s)
Ellie Cole	100 m butterfly S9	1:14.37	8 Q	1:10.40 OC	4
Ellie Cole	100 m freestyle S9	1:04.58	2 Q	1:02.77 OC	1st place, gold medalist(s)
Ellie Cole	200 m individual medley SM9	2:44.31	9	Did not advance	
Ellie Cole	400 m freestyle S9	4:53.01	3 Q	4:42.87 OC	3rd place, bronze medalist(s)
Taylor Corry	100 m backstroke S14	1:11.70	6 Q	1:09.46	2nd place, silver medalist(s)
Taylor Corry	100 m breaststroke SB14	1:30.89	=15	Did not advance	
Taylor Corry	200 m freestyle S14	2:14.99	3 Q	2:13.18	2nd place, silver medalist(s)
Katherine Downie	50 m freestyle S10	0:29.40	7 Q	29.10 OC	7
Katherine Downie	100 m backstroke S10	1:12.50	5 Q	1:11.40	4
Katherine Downie	100 m breaststroke SB9	1:27.41	12	Did not advance	
Katherine Downie	100 m butterfly S10	1:11.37	4 Q	1:10.20	5
Katherine Downie	100 m freestyle S10	1:03.16	4 Q	1:02.34	5
Katherine Downie	200 m individual medley SM10	2:35.21	4 Q	2:34.64	4
Katherine Downie	400 m freestyle S10	4:57.28	6 Q	4:53.59	6
Maddison Elliott	50 m freestyle S8	0:31.57 OC	1 Q	0:31.44 OC	2nd place, silver medalist(s)
Maddison Elliott	100 m backstroke S8	1:24.34	8 Q	1:23.25	6
Maddison Elliott	100 m butterfly S8	1:15.30 OC	5 Q	1:15.06 OC	6
Maddison Elliott	100 m freestyle S8	1:07.62 OC	3 Q	1:08.37	3rd place, bronze medalist(s)
Maddison Elliott	200 m individual medley SM8	2:59.33	6 Q	2:59.26	7
Maddison Elliott	400 m freestyle S8	5:13.34	3 Q	5:09.36	3rd place, bronze medalist(s)
Amanda Fowler	100 m breaststroke SB14	1:24.79	7 Q	1:23.30	5
Jacqueline Freney	50 m butterfly S7	0:36.03 OC	1 Q	0:35.16 OC	1st place, gold medalist(s)
Jacqueline Freney	50 m freestyle S7	0:32.92 PR	1 Q	0:32.63 PR	1st place, gold medalist(s)
Jacqueline Freney	100 m backstroke S7	1:23.34 PR	1 Q	1:22.84 PR	1st place, gold medalist(s)
Jacqueline Freney	100 m freestyle S7	1:09.74 PR	1 Q	1:09.39 PR	1st place, gold medalist(s)
Jacqueline Freney	200 m individual medley SM7	2:56.00	1 Q	2:54.42 WR	1st place, gold medalist(s)
Jacqueline Freney	400 m freestyle S7	5:01.04 PR	1 Q	4:59.02 WR	1st place, gold medalist(s)
Tanya Huebner	50 m butterfly S6	44.78	13	Did not advance	
Tanya Huebner	50 m freestyle S6	0:38.78	11	Did not advance	
Tanya Huebner	100 m breaststroke SB6	1:43.64	4 Q	1:42.45	4
Tanya Huebner	100 m freestyle S6	1:30.76	14	Did not advance	
Tanya Huebner	200 m individual medley SM6	3:39.12	12	Did not advance	
Kara Leo	100 m backstroke S14	1:17.15	9	Did not advance	
Kara Leo	200 m freestyle S14	2:17.28	8 Q	2:18.04	8
Esther Overton	50 m freestyle S3	DNS			
Katrina Porter	50 m freestyle S7	0:39.14	14	Did not advance	
Katrina Porter	100 m backstroke S7	1:27.80	6 Q	1:26.64	7
Katrina Porter	100 m breaststroke SB6	1:53.63	5 Q	1:54.54	5
Katrina Porter	100 m freestyle S7	1:21.95	9	Did not advance	
Katrina Porter	400 m freestyle S7	5:44.50	6 Q	5:41.58	7
Sarah Rose	50 m butterfly S6	40.39	6 Q	40.43	6
Sarah Rose	50 m freestyle S6	0:39.37	14	Did not advance	
Sarah Rose	200 m individual medley SM6	3:36.84	11	Did not advance	
Teigan Van Roosmalen	50 m freestyle S13	0:29.40	6 Q	0:29.40	6
Teigan Van Roosmalen	100 m breaststroke SB13	1:24.41	5 Q	1:24.03	7
Teigan Van Roosmalen	100 m freestyle S13	1:04.31	7 Q	1:04.87	7
Teigan Van Roosmalen	200 m individual medley SM13	2:37.21	5 Q	2:35.61	6
Prue Watt	50 m freestyle S13	0:27.75 OC	2 Q	0:27.94	3rd place, bronze medalist(s)
Prue Watt	100 m breaststroke SB13	1:20.36 OC	1 Q	1:19.19 OC	1st place, gold medalist(s)
Prue Watt	100 m freestyle S13	1:01.61	3 Q	1:02.32	5
Prue Watt	200 m individual medley SM13	2:35.45	3 Q	2:34.77	5
Annabelle Williams	50 m freestyle S9	0:30.03	5 Q	0:29.76	6
Annabelle Williams	100 m freestyle S9	1:05.47	5 Q	1:05.73	7
Ellie Cole; Maddison Elliott; Katherine Downie; Jacqueline Freney	4x100 m freestyle relay 34 points			4:20.29 WR	1st place, gold medalist(s)
Ellie Cole; Katherine Downie; Jacqueline Freney; Annabelle Williams	4x100 m medley relay 34 points			4:53.95 OC	1st place, gold medalist(s)

Qualification Legend: Q= Qualified for final; OC= Oceania Record; PR= Paralympic Record; WR= World Record

Support staff – Administration – Karyn Burgess (Section Manager); Coaches – Brendan Keogh (Head), Angelo Basalo, Tom Davis, Michael Freney, Rob Hindmarsh, Jon O'Neil-Shaw, Chris Phillips, Bash Zidan; Personal Care Attendant – Tara Andrews; Physiotherapist – David Spurrier, Jo Evershed; Sport Scientists – Brendan Burkett, Sacha Fulton; Soft tissue therapist – Penny Will; Psychologist – Jason Patchell

Australia finished second on the gold medal table and won a total of 37 medals 18 gold, 7 silver and 12 bronze. Leading swimmers were – Jacqueline Freney won 8 gold medals, Matthew Cowdrey won 5 gold medals, 2 silver medals and 1 bronze medal and Ellie Cole won 4 gold medals and 2 bronze medals.

=== Table tennis ===
Selected team of 2 athletes.
Women- Melissa Tapper and Rebecca McDonnell. Support staff – Administration – Roger Massie (Section Manager); Coach – Alois Rosario (Head)

Australia did not win any medals.

Women

Athlete	Event	Preliminaries			Quarterfinals	Semifinals	Bronze medal match	
Athlete	Event	Opposition Result	Opposition Result	Opposition Result	Opposition Result	Opposition Result	Opposition Result	Rank
Melissa Tapper	Singles class 10	Audrey Le Morvan (FRA); W 3–0 (11–7, 11–2, 11–4)	Fan Lei (CHN); L 3–0 (7–11–7, 6–11, 6–11)	Bruna Alexandre (BRA); W 3–2 (10–12, 8–11, 11–5, 11–7, 11–9)	n/a	Natalia Partyka (POL); L 0–3 (9–11, 2–11, 4–11);	Fan Lei (CHN); L 2–3 (11–8, 11–9, 5–11. 6–11, 7–11)	4
Rebecca McDonnell	Singles class 6	Stephanie Grebe (GER); W0–3 (5–11, 1–11, 4–11)	Alicja Eigner (POL); L 0–3 (9–11, 9–11, 8–11)	Yuliya Klymenko (UKR); L 0–3 (3–11, 3–11, 6–11)	Did not advance			
Melissa Tapper; Rebecca McDonnell	Team class 6–10	Bye			France (FRA); L 2–3	Did not advance		

=== Wheelchair basketball ===
==== Men's tournament ====
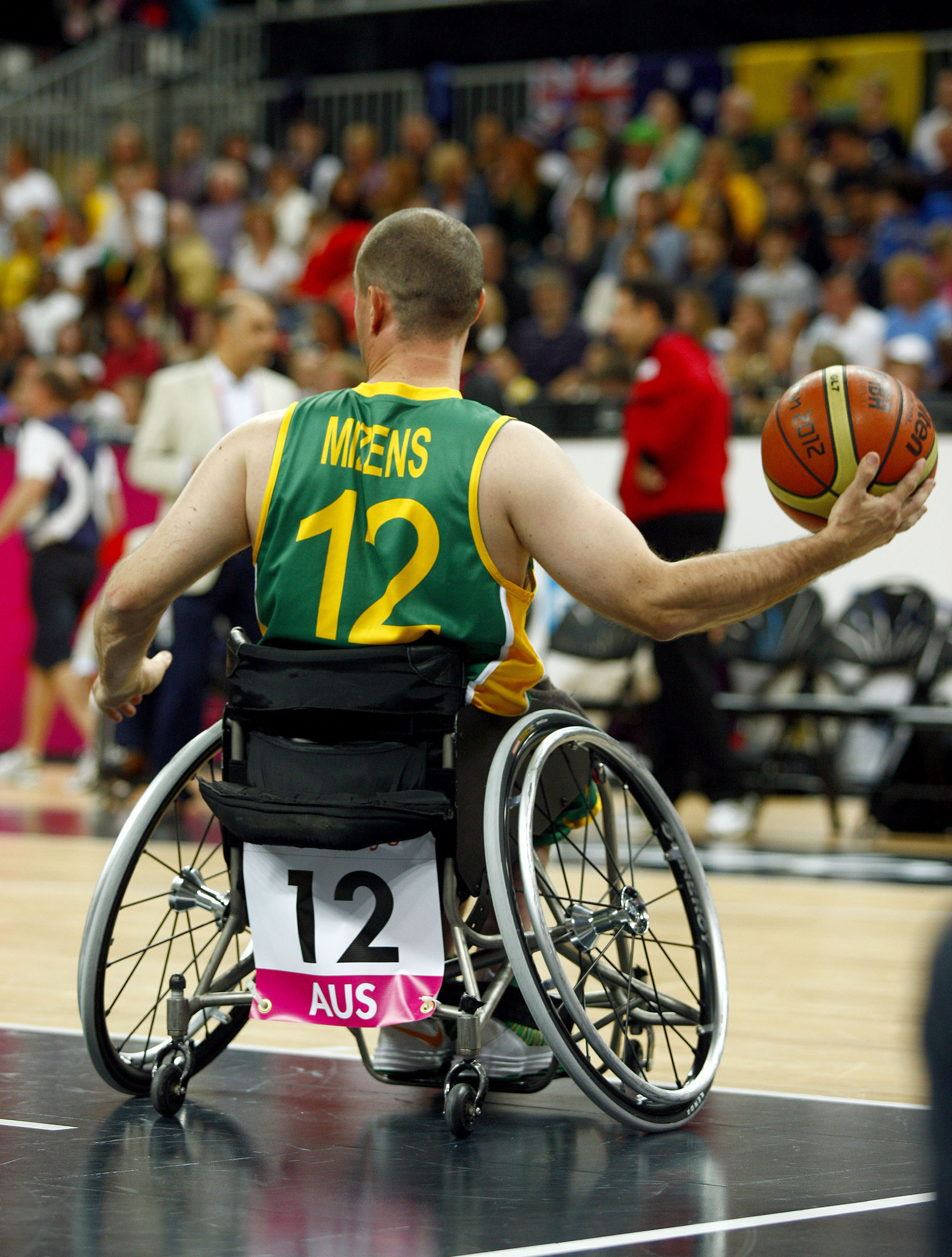
Mizens at the 2012 London Paralympics

The Australian men's wheelchair basketball team were in Group A with the United States, Spain, South Africa, Italy and Turkey. Australia won the silver medal, losing to Canada in the final.

The following is the Australia roster in the men's wheelchair basketball tournament of the 2012 Summer Paralympics.

Australia men's national wheelchair basketball team – 2012 Summer Paralympics roster
Players
Coaches

No.	Name	Age – Date of birth	Pts.	Club	Ctr.
4	Justin Eveson	32 – 10 June 1980		Be Active Perth Wheelcats	(Australia)
5	Bill Latham	22 – 20 October 1989		RSL Qld Spinning Bullets	(Australia)
6	Brett Stibners	33 – 25 June 1979		Wollongong Roller Hawks	(Australia)
7	Shaun Norris	27 – 2 April 1985		Be Active Perth Wheelcats	(Australia)
8	Michael Hartnett	30 – 3 June 1982		Be Active Perth Wheelcats	(Australia)
9	Tristan Knowles	29 – 25 April 1983		Wollongong Roller Hawks	(Australia)
10	Jannik Blair	20 – 3 February 1992		Vic Dandenong Rangers	(Australia)
11	Tige Simmons	35 – 5 May 1977		RSL Qld Spinning Bullets	(Australia)
12	Grant Mizens	35 – 19 April 1977		Wollongong Roller Hawks	(Australia)
13	Dylan Alcott	21 – 4 December 1990		Vic Dandenong Rangers	(Australia)
14	Nick Taylor	32 – 18 January 1980		Wollongong Roller Hawks	(Australia)
15	Brad Ness	37 – 24 November 1974		Be Active Perth Wheelcats	(Australia)

Head coach

- (Australia) Ben Ettridge

Assistant coach(es)

- (Australia) Matteo Feriani
- (Australia) Thomas Kyle

Legend

- Club – describes last
  club before the tournament
- Age – describes age
  on 30 August 2012

Group stage

Team	Pld	W	L	PF	PA	PD	Pts	Qualification
Australia	5	5	0	372	259	+113	10	Quarter-finals
Turkey	5	3	2	331	302	+29	8 (Note: Head-to-head score differential: TUR: +6; USA: −1; ESP: −5)	Quarter-finals
United States	5	3	2	330	259	+71	8	Quarter-finals
Spain	5	3	2	322	292	+30	8	Quarter-finals
Italy	5	1	4	260	309	−49	6	Eliminated
South Africa	5	0	5	204	398	−194	5	Eliminated

Rules for classification: 1) Table points, 2) Head-to-head score differential
Notes:

30 August 2012
20:45

Report

Australia	93–39	South Africa
Scoring by quarter: 27–16, 20–4, 26–10, 20–9
Pts: Eveson 21; Rebs: Eveson 7 Asts: Eveson, Norris 5		Pts: Nortje 14; Rebs: Nortje 10; Asts: three players 2

Basketball Arena, London
Referees: Saskia Warmerdam (NED)

31 August 2012
18:30

Report

Turkey	64–71	Australia
Scoring by quarter: 15–17, 20–22, 16–16, 13–16
Pts: Gürbulak 20; Rebs: Gezinci 12; Asts: Dalay 7		Pts: Eveson, Knowles 17; Rebs: Ness 11; Asts: Norris 8

Basketball Arena, London
Referees: Sébastien Gauthier (CAN)

1 September 2012
20:45

Report

Australia	75–59	Spain
Scoring by quarter: 20–15, 24–12, 16–23, 15–9
Pts: Norris 25; Rebs: Eveson, Latham 8 Asts: Eveson 7		Pts: García Pereiro 23; Rebs: García Pereiro 6 Asts: De Paz Pazo, Muiño Gámez 5

Basketball Arena, London
Referees: Valerie Farrugia (FRA)

2 September 2012
19:00

Report

Australia	65–49	United States
Scoring by quarter: 13–12, 14–8, 18–13, 20–16
Pts: Norris 16; Rebs: Eveson 16; Asts: Eveson 9		Pts: Turek, Nelms 8 Rebs: Jenifer, Scott 7 Asts: Serio 7

North Greenwich Arena, London
Referees: Sergio Giordano (CAN)

3 September 2012
15:15

Report

Italy	48–68	Australia
Scoring by quarter: 11–15, 10–18, 17–24, 10–11
Pts: Cavagnini 16; Rebs: Pellegrini 12; Asts: Moukhariq 5		Pts: Stibners 17; Rebs: Eveson, Latham 6 Asts: Norris 5

Basketball Arena, London
Referees: Saskia Warmerdam (NED)

Quarter-final

5 September 2012
21:15

Report

Australia	76–53	Poland
Scoring by quarter: 26–11, 13–17, 21–18, 16–7
Pts: Ness 26; Rebs: Norris, Ness 5 Asts: Eveson 6		Pts: Filipski 26; Rebs: Filipski 10; Asts: Filipski 8

North Greenwich Arena, London
Referees: Sergio Giordano (CAN)

Semi-final

6 September 2012
19:00

Report

Australia	72–63	United States
Scoring by quarter: 18–8, 17–23, 17–14, 20–18
Pts: Eveson 21; Rebs: Eveson 10; Asts: Norris 8		Pts: Chambers 12; Rebs: Lade, Waller 4 Asts: Serio, Schulte 5

North Greenwich Arena, London
Referees: Cris Salguero (ARG)

Gold medal match

8 September 2012
21:15

Report

Australia	58–64	Canada
Scoring by quarter: 15–14, 12–12, 15–20, 16–18
Pts: Norris 19; Rebs: Eveson 8 Asts: Eveson 5		Pts: Anderson 34; Rebs: Anderson 10; Asts: Anderson 8

North Greenwich Arena, London
Referees: Juan Uruñuela (ESP)

Support staff – men – administration – Leigh Gooding (section manager); coaches – Ben Ettridge (head), Matteo Feriani (assistant), Thomas Kyle (assistant), physiotherapist – Jesse Adams.

==== Women's tournament ====
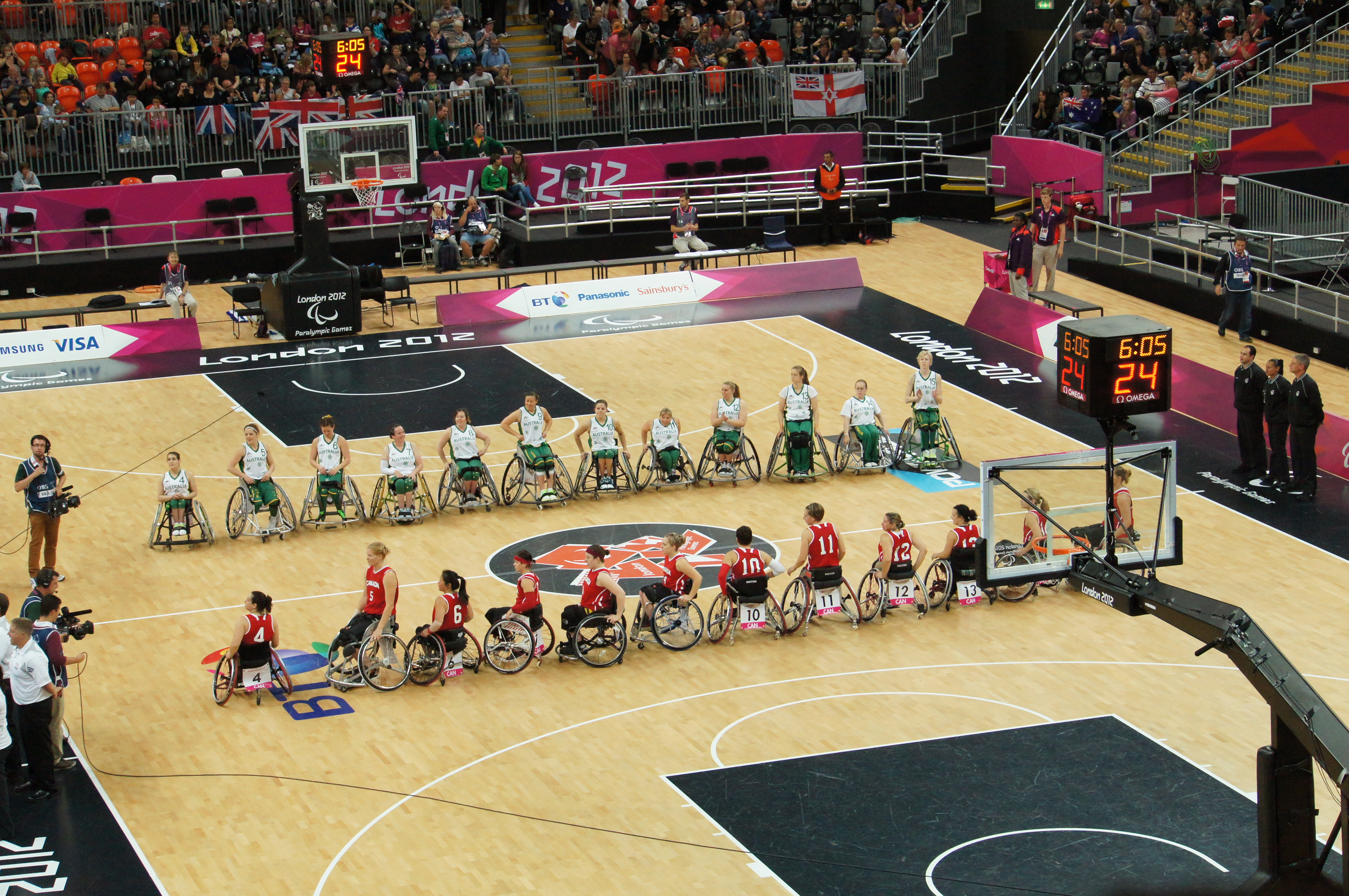
Australian women's wheelchair basketball team in the match with Canada.

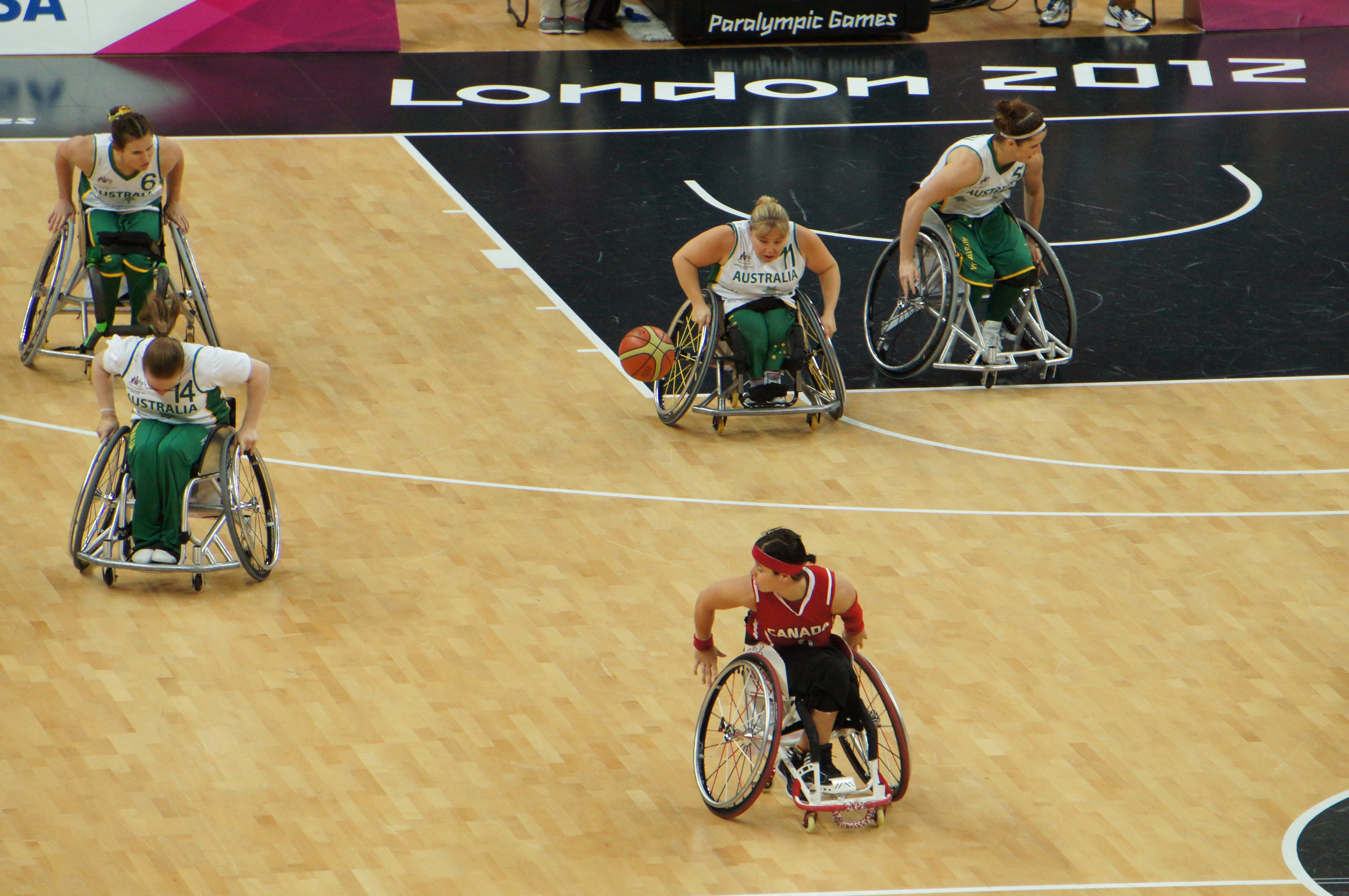
Australian women's wheelchair basketball team in the match with Canada.

The Australian women's wheelchair basketball team were in Group A with the Netherlands, Great Britain, Brazil and Canada. Australia won the silver medal, losing to Germany in the final.

The following is the Australia roster in the women's wheelchair basketball tournament of the 2012 Summer Paralympics.

Australia women's national wheelchair basketball team – 2012 Summer Paralympics roster
Players
Coaches

No.	Name	Age – Date of birth	Pts.	Club	Ctr.
4	Sarah Vinci	20 – 4 December 1991		Western Stars	(Australia)
5	Cobi Crispin	23 – 22 December 1988		Vic Dandenong Rangers	(Australia)
6	Bridie Kean	25 – 27 February 1987		Minecraft Comets	(Australia)
7	Amanda Carter	48 – 16 July 1964		Vic Dandenong Rangers	(Australia)
8	Tina Mckenzie	38 – 8 June 1974		Stacks Goudkamp Bears	(Australia)
9	Leanne Del Toso	32 – 12 August 1980		Vic Dandenong Rangers	(Australia)
10	Clare Nott	26 – 11 August 1986		Western Stars	(Australia)
11	Kylie Gauci	27 – 1 January 1985		Stacks Goudkamp Bears	(Australia)
12	Shelley Chaplin	27 – 4 September 1984		Vic Dandenong Rangers	(Australia)
13	Sarah Stewart	36 – 13 June 1976		Sydney Uni Flames	(Australia)
14	Katie Hill	28 – 17 February 1984		Sydney Uni Flames	(Australia)
15	Amber Merritt	19 – 17 February 1993		Western Stars	(Australia)

Head coach

- (Australia) John Triscari

Assistant coach(es)

- (Australia) David Gould
- (Australia) Ben Osborne

Legend

- Club – describes last
  club before the tournament
- Age – describes age
  on 30 August 2012

Group stage

Team	Pld	W	L	PF	PA	PD	Pts	Qualification
Australia	4	3	1	211	180	+31	7 (Note: head-to-head score differential: AUS: +2; NED: +2; CAN: −4) (Note: Netherlands and Australia have the same score difference but Australia won the match from the Netherlands (58–49))	Quarter-finals
Netherlands	4	3	1	236	194	+42	7	Quarter-finals
Canada	4	3	1	248	231	+17	7	Quarter-finals
Great Britain	4	1	3	151	217	−66	5	Quarter-finals
Brazil	4	0	4	190	214	−24	4	Eliminated

Rules for classification: 1) Table points, 2) Head-to-head score differential
Notes:

30 August 2012
18:30

Report

Australia	52–50	Brazil
Scoring by quarter: 14–12, 11–13, 14–12, 13–13
Pts: Crispin 18; Rebs: Merritt 10; Asts: three players 3		Pts: Soares Martins 27; Rebs: Soares Martins 14; Asts: Guimarrães da Costa 12

Basketball Arena, London
Referees: Linas Radykas (LTU)

31 August 2012
13:00

Report

Great Britain	24–51	Australia
Scoring by quarter: 5–11, 6–14, 3–14, 10–12
Pts: Hamer 8 Rebs: Strange 7 Asts: three players 2		Pts: Merritt 10; Rebs: Crispin 7 Asts: Gauci 4

North Greenwich Arena, London
Referees: Nureddin Bilmez (TUR)

1 September 2012
18:30

Report

Australia	50–57	Canada
Scoring by quarter: 12–20, 20–13, 8–10, 10–14
Pts: Merritt 16; Rebs: Crispin 15; Asts: Chaplin 7		Pts: McLachlan 28; Rebs: McLachlan 21; Asts: Ouellet 9

Basketball Arena, London
Referees: Karen Molina (COL)

2 September 2012
21:15

Report

Netherlands	49–58	Australia
Scoring by quarter: 12–18, 8–12, 9–10, 20–18
Pts: Huitzing 14; Rebs: Huitzing 8 Asts: Huitzing 7		Pts: Merritt 19; Rebs: Crispin 7 Asts: Chaplin 7

North Greenwich Arena, London
Referees: Darrell Hargreaves (USA)

Quarter-final

4 September 2012
13:00

Report

Australia	62–37	Mexico
Scoring by quarter: 21–10, 23–10, 6–9, 12–8
Pts: Merritt 14; Rebs: Kean 5 Asts: Gauci 7		Pts: Estrada Bernal 11; Rebs: Estrada Bernal 4 Asts: Estrada Bernal 16

North Greenwich Arena, London
Referees: Valerie Farrugia (FRA)

Semi-final

6 September 2012
13:00

Report

Australia	40–39	United States
Scoring by quarter: 10–12, 16–14, 12–2, 2–11
Pts: three players 8 Rebs: Merritt 6 Asts: three players 3		Pts: Murray 18; Rebs: Murray, Schneider 9 Asts: Murray 3

North Greenwich Arena, London
Referees: Sébastien Gauthier (CAN)

Gold medal match

7 September 2012
21:15

Report

Australia	44–58	Germany
Scoring by quarter: 10–14, 9–12, 9–8, 16–24
Pts: Gauci 15; Rebs: Gauci, Merritt 5 Asts: Crispin, Chaplin 5		Pts: Adermann 19; Rebs: Mohnen 9 Asts: Adermann, Zeyen 5

North Greenwich Arena, London
Referees: Sergio Giordano (CAN)

Support staff – women – administration – Marian Stewart (section manager); coaches – John Triscari (head), David Gould, Ben Osborne; physiotherapist – Miranda Wallis.

=== Wheelchair rugby ===
Selected team of 11 athletes

Australian team
Nazim Erdem, Ryan Scott (Co-captain), Jason Lees, Cameron Carr (Co-captain), Andrew Harrison, Greg Smith, Cody Meakin, Josh Hose, Ben Newton, Ryley Batt, Chris Bond; Head

Six athletes made their Games debut. Greg Smith was the flag bearer for the opening ceremonies. The Australian team 'the Steelers' went into the Games as the silver medallist from the 2008 Beijing Games and 2010 World Wheelchair Rugby Championships. Australia defeated Canada to win its first wheelchair rugby gold medal.

Group stage

Team	Pld	W	D	L	GF	GA	GD	Pts	Qualification
Australia (AUS)	3	3	0	0	182	142	+40	6	Semifinals
Canada (CAN)	3	2	0	1	163	166	−3	4	Semifinals
Sweden (SWE)	3	1	0	2	151	155	−4	2	Eliminated
Belgium (BEL)	3	0	0	3	135	168	−33	0	Eliminated

5 September 2012
19:00

Australia	64 – 52	Canada
Batt – 37; Bond – 10; Team – 4 Carr – 3 Harrison – 3 Smith – 2 Newton – 1 Hose – 1 Lees – 1 Meakin – 1 Scott – 1	Report	Lavoie – 9 Hirschfield – 8 Crone – 7 Madell – 7 Hickling – 6 Whitehead – 5 Willsie – 4 Dagenais – 2 Chan – 2 Simard – 2

Basketball Arena
Attendance: 5,539
Referee: Darren Roberts (USA), Dave Woods (GBR)

6 September 2012
14:00

Sweden	47 – 60	Australia
Uhlmann – 9 Norlin – 8 Kulle – 7 Hjelt – 7 Collin – 6 Team – 4 Sandberg – 3 Jansson – 2 Wahlberg – 1	Report	Batt – 30; Bond – 14; Team – 4 Carr – 3 Newton – 2 Smith – 2 Harrison – 2 Hose – 1 Lees – 1 Meakin – 1

Basketball Arena
Attendance: 5,622
Referee: Pierre-Alexandre Brière (CAN), Alexander Schreiner (GER)

7 September 2012
10:00

Australia	58 – 43	Belgium
Batt – 29; Carr – 11; Bond – 9 Smith – 4 Hose – 1 Lees – 1 Meakin – 1 Harrison – 1 Team – 1	Report	Mertens – 14; Genyn – 11; Verhaegen – 5 Hendrix – 4 Team – 4 Budeners – 3 Vanacker – 2

Basketball Arena
Attendance: 2,822
Referee: Motoko Izumiya (JPN), Chris van de Riet (NED)

Semi-finals

8 September 2012
14:00

Australia	59 – 45	Japan
Batt – 27; Bond – 14; Smith – 6 Scott – 2 Lees – 2 Meakin – 2 Newton – 1 Carr – 1 Harrison – 1 Team – 3	Report	Ikezakli – 24; Nakazato – 7 Kanno – 6 Shimakawa – 4 Sato – 2 Team – 2

Basketball Arena
Attendance: 5,333
Referee: Mitch Carr (USA), Darren Roberts (USA)

Gold medal match

9 September 2012
14:15

Canada	51 – 66	Australia
Madell – 11; Hickling – 7 Whitehead – 7 Murao – 6 Chan – 5 Willsie – 4 Simard – 3 Lavoie – 2 Dagenais – 1 Hirschfield – 1 Team – 4	Report	Batt – 37; Bond – 15; Carr – 4 Smith – 2 Scott – 1 Lees – 1 Meakin – 1 Newton – 1 Harrison – 1 Team – 3

Basketball Arena
Attendance: 9,048
Referee: Darren Roberts (USA), Chris van de Riet (NED)

Support staff – Administration – Paul Kiteley (Section Manager); Coach – Brad Dubberley (Head); Technical Support – Chevvy Cooper; Personal Care Assistant – Angela Mansell; Physiotherapist – Simon Mole

=== Wheelchair tennis ===
Selected team of 4 athletes.

Men	Women
Ben Weekes, Adam Kellerman	Daniela Di Toro, Janel Manns

Support staff – Administration – Brenda Tierney (Section Manager); Coaches – Greg Crump (Head), Craig Purcell

Daniela Di Toro competed at her fifth Games. Australia did not win any medals.

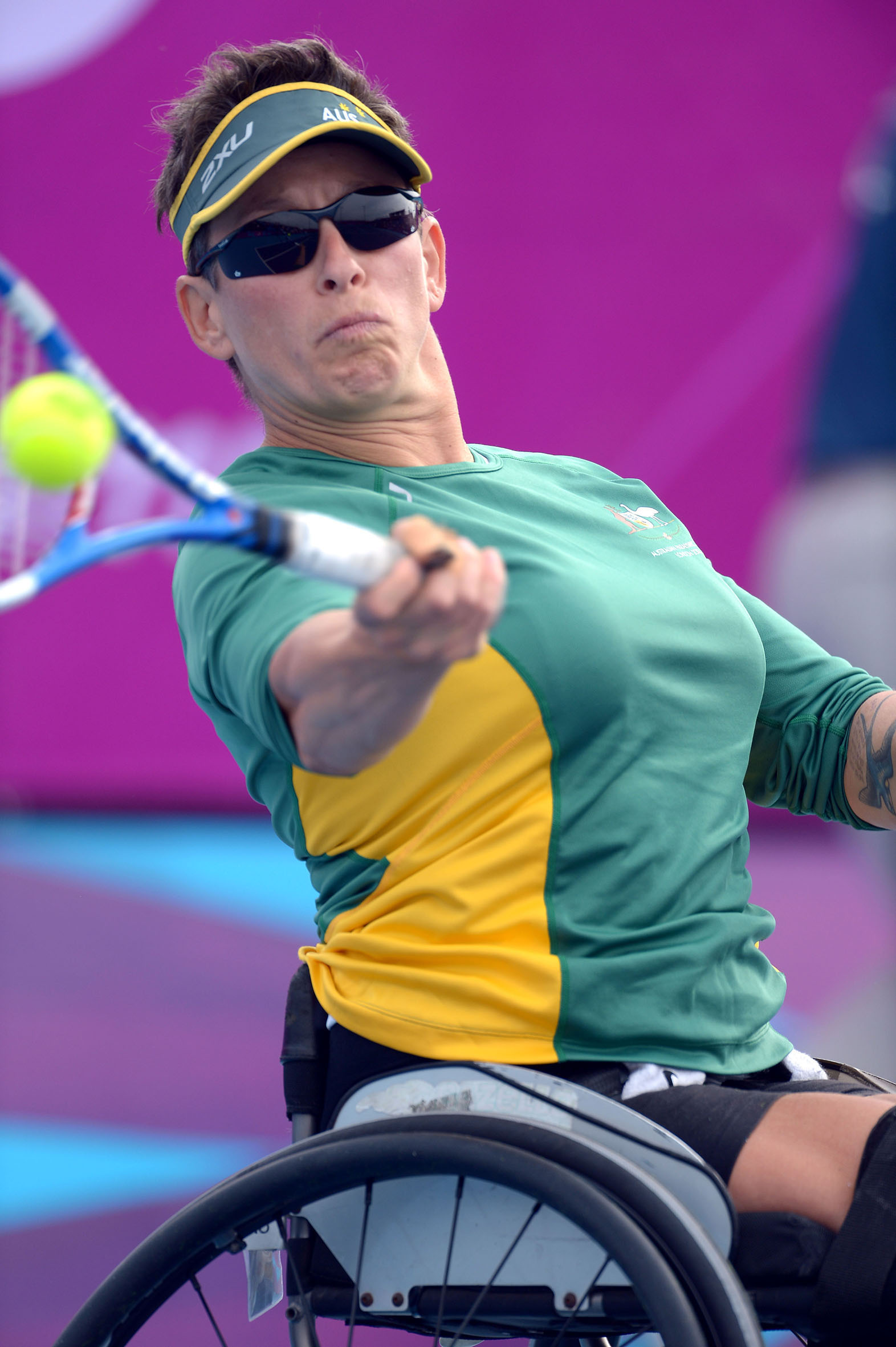
Di Toro playing at the 2012 London Paralympics

Athlete (seed)	Event	Round of 64	Round of 32	Round of 16	Quarterfinals	Semifinals	Final / BM	
Athlete (seed)	Event	Opposition Score	Opposition Score	Opposition Score	Opposition Score	Opposition Score	Opposition Score	Rank
Adam Kellerman	Men's singles	Peter Vikstrom (SWE); W 6–4, 6–3	Satoshi Saida (JPN); W 6–3, 6–2	Ronald Vink (NED) (2); L 0–6, 2–6	Did not advance			
Ben Weekes	Men's singles	Francesc Tur (ESP); W 6–4, 6–2	Tom Egberink (NED) (14); L 2–6, 2–6	Did not advance				
Daniela Di Toro	Women's singles	—N/a	Angelica Bernal Villalobos (COL); W 6–1, 6–1	Sakhorn Khanthasit (THA); L 6–1, 0–6, 3–6	Did not advance			
Janel Manns (8)	Women's singles	—N/a	Aniek van Koot (NED); L 0–6, 0–6	Did not advance				
Adam Kellerman; Ben Weekes	Men's doubles	—N/a	Albin Batycki; Kamil Fabisiak, (POL); W 6–1, 6–1	Shingo Kunieda; Satoshi Saida (JPN); L 2–6, 3–6	Did not advance			
Daniela Di Toro; Janel Manns	Women's doubles	—N/a		Sakhorn Khanthasit; Ratana Techamaneewat (THA); LW 6–3, 6–3	Did not advance			

== Administration and support ==
Team Executive – Jason Hellwig (Chef de Mission), Michael Hartung (Deputy Cheff de Mission), Kate McLoughlin(Deputy Chef de Mission), Adam McCarthy (Paralympic Attache), Kurt Plummer (Security Liaison Officer), Jim FitzSimons (General Counsel)

Operations - Caroline Walker (Manager, Logistics), Anna Muldoon (Coordinator, Logistics), Chris Nunn (Manager, Coach Services), Steven Graham (Assistant, Coach Services), Greg Omay (Assistant, Coach Services), Natalie Hutchinson (Manager, Team Services), Cathy Lambert, (Coordinator, Team Services), Chris Voysey (Manager, Information Technology), Tim Murphy (Assistant, Information Technology), Genevieve McMahon (Manager, Classification), Steve Loader(Manager, Off Airport Processing)

Media Team – Tim Mannion (Manager, Media, and Communications), Shaun Giles (Manager, Multimedia), Margie McDonald (MLO), Gennie Sheer (MLO), Lachlan Searle (MLO), Chris Abbott (MLO), David Sygall (MLO), Jacqualine Chartres (MLO), Rebekka Wake (MLO), Sarah Rogers (MLO), Darcy Bonser (Coordinator, Multimedia), Olivia McGrath (Coordinator, Multimedia), Neil Cross (MLO), Jeff Crow (Chief Photographer), Judy Goldman (MLO, Sydney Office)

Medical Staff - Alison Campbell (Manager, SSSM), Linda Clow (Team Doctor), Corey Cunningham (Team Doctor), Geoff Thompson (Team Doctor), Ruth Fazakerley (Nurse/Clinic Administrator), Richard Bennett (Psychologist), Sarah Jack (Psychologist), Liz Broad (Manager, Nutrition), Siobhan Moran (Assistant, Nutrition), Jo Vaile (Manager, Recovery), Matthew Driller (Assistant, Recovery), Keren Faulkner (Manager, Physical Therapies), Penny Dayan (Physiotherapist), Gilian Niven (Soft Tissue Therapist), Scott Smith (Soft Tissue Therapist), Ebonie Scase (Physiotherapist), Zoe Horder(Personal Care Attendant)

== Welcome home celebrations ==
The team returned to Sydney Airport to be greeted by a number of Australian Government ministers, family, friends and the media. The team was treated to a performance by the band Icehouse. Congratulatory messages were from Acting Prime Minister Wayne Swan, Minister for Sport Kate Lundy and Opposition Leader Tony Abbott.

== See also ==
- 2012 Summer Paralympics
- Australia at the Paralympics
- Australia at the 2012 Summer Olympics
- Images of Australian Team at the 2012 London Paralympics
