= Cycling at the 2012 Summer Paralympics – Women's road time trial C4 =

Cycling, Women's road time trial C4 at the XIV Paralympic Games
- Venue: Brands Hatch
- Dates: September 5, 2012
- Competitors: 6 from 5 nations

Medalists
1st place, gold medalist(s)		Megan Fisher	United States
2nd place, silver medalist(s)		Susan Powell	Australia
3rd place, bronze medalist(s)		Marie-Claude Molnar	Canada

The Women's time trial C4 road cycling event at the 2012 Summer Paralympics took place on September 5 at Brands Hatch. Six riders from five different nations competed. The race distance was 16 km.

== Results ==
Rank	Name	Country	Time
1st place, gold medalist(s)	Megan Fisher	United States	26:04.39
2nd place, silver medalist(s)	Susan Powell	Australia	26:31.30
3rd place, bronze medalist(s)	Marie-Claude Molnar	Canada	26:48.52
4	Alexandra Green	Australia	27:43.57
5	Ruan Jianping	China	30:16.66
6	Roxanne Burns	South Africa	32:39.24
