= United States at the 2012 Summer Paralympics =

- Flag of the United States
- IPC code: USA
- NPC: United States Paralympic Committee
- Website: www.teamusa.org/US-Paralympics

in London
- Competitors: 227 in 19 sports
- Medals Ranked 6th: Gold 31 Silver 29 Bronze 37 Total 97

Summer Paralympics appearances (overview)
- 1960; 1964; 1968; 1972; 1976; 1980; 1984; 1988; 1992; 1996; 2000; 2004; 2008; 2012; 2016; 2020; 2024

The United States competed at the 2012 Summer Paralympics in London, United Kingdom, from August 29 to September 9, 2012.

== Medallists ==
The following American competitors won medals at the Games.

Medal	Name	Sport	Event	Date
Gold	Jessica Long	Swimming	Women's 100 metre butterfly S8	30 August
Gold	Joseph Berenyi	Cycling	Men's Individual Pursuit C3	31 August
Gold	Jessica Long	Swimming	Women's 400 metre freestyle S8	31 August
Gold	Brad Snyder	Swimming	Men's 100 metre freestyle S11	31 August
Gold	Kelley Becherer	Swimming	Women's 50 metre freestyle S13	1 September
Gold	Jessica Long	Swimming	Women's 100 metre breaststroke SB7	1 September
Gold	Raymond Martin	Athletics	Men's 100 metres T52	2 September
Gold	Kelley Becherer	Swimming	Women's 100 metre freestyle S13	2 September
Gold	Mallory Weggemann	Swimming	Women's 100 metre freestyle S8	2 September
Gold	Jeff Fabry	Archery	Men's Individual Compound W1	3 September
Gold	Raymond Martin	Athletics	Men's 400 metres T52	3 September
Gold	Tatyana McFadden	Athletics	Women's 400 metres T54	3 September
Gold	Justin Zook	Swimming	Men's 100 metre backstroke S10	4 September
Gold	Lantz Lamback	Swimming	Men's 50 metre freestyle S7	4 September
Gold	Tatyana McFadden	Athletics	Women's 800 metres T54	5 September
Gold	Megan Fisher	Cycling	Women's road time trial C4	5 September
Gold	Allison Jones	Cycling	Women's road time trial C1-3	5 September
Gold	Marianna Davis	Cycling	Women's road time trial H1-2	5 September
Gold	Jessica Long	Swimming	Women's 200 metre individual medley SM8	5 September
Gold	Nicholas Taylor; David Wagner	Wheelchair tennis	Men's Quad doubles	5 September
Gold	Ian Jaryd Silverman	Swimming	Men's 400 metre freestyle S10	5 September
Gold	Jeremy Campbell	Athletics	Men's Discus Throw F44	6 September
Gold	Jessica Long	Swimming	Women's 100 metre freestyle S8	6 September
Gold	Raymond Martin	Athletics	Men's 800 metres T52	7 September
Gold	Tatyana McFadden	Athletics	Women's 1500 metres T54	7 September
Gold	Marianna Davis	Cycling	Women's road race H1-3	7 September
Gold	Brad Snyder	Swimming	Men's 400 metre freestyle S11	7 September
Gold	Victoria Arlen	Swimming	Women's 100 metre freestyle S6	8 September
Gold	Raymond Martin	Athletics	Men's 200 metres T52	8 September
Gold	Matthew Updike; Oscar Sanchez; Marianna Davis	Cycling	Mixed Team Relay H1-4	8 September
Gold	Shirley Reilly	Athletics	Women's marathon	9 September
Silver	Megan Fisher	Cycling	Women's Individual Pursuit C4	30 August
Silver	Shaquille Vance	Athletics	Men's 200 metre T42	1 September
Silver	Jennifer Schuble	Cycling	Women's 500 metre time trial C4-5	1 September
Silver	Myles Porter	Judo	Men's -100 kg	1 September
Silver	Victoria Arlen	Swimming	Women's 400 metre freestyle S6	1 September
Silver	Bradley Snyder	Swimming	Men's 50 metre freestyle S11	1 September
Silver	Shirley Reilly	Athletics	Women's 5000 metres T54	2 September
Silver	Rudy Garcia-Tolson	Swimming	Men's 200 metre individual medley SM7	2 September
Silver	Matt Stutzman	Archery	Men's Individual Compound Open	3 September
Silver	Cortney Jordan	Swimming	Women's 100 metre freestyle S7	3 September
Silver	Susan Beth Scott; Victoria Arlen; Jessica Long; Anna Eames	Swimming	Women's 4 × 100 metre freestyle relay 34pts	3 September
Silver	Elexis Gillette	Athletics	Men's Long Jump F11	4 September
Silver	Jessica Long	Swimming	Women's 100 metre backstroke S8	4 September
Silver	Victoria Arlen	Swimming	Women's 50 metre freestyle S6	4 September
Silver	Cortney Jordan	Swimming	Women's 50 metre freestyle S7	4 September
Silver	Joseph Berenyi	Cycling	Men's road time trial C3	5 September
Silver	Monica Bascio	Cycling	Women's road time trial H3	5 September
Silver	Tucker Dupree	Swimming	Men's 100 metre backstroke S12	5 September
Silver	Richard Browne	Athletics	Men's 100 metres T44	6 September
Silver	Cortney Jordan	Swimming	Women's 400 metre freestyle S7	6 September
Silver	Jen French; JP Creignou	Sailing	SKUD 18 – 2 person keelboat	6 September
Silver	Monica Bascio	Cycling	Women's road race H1-3	7 September
Silver	Team USA	Sitting Volleyball	Sitting Volleyball	7 September
Silver	Roy Perkins	Swimming	Men's 50 metre butterfly S5	7 September
Silver	Rebecca Meyers	Swimming	Women's 200 metre individual medley SM13	7 September
Silver	Jeff Skiba	Athletics	Men's high jump F46	8 September
Silver	Blake Leeper	Athletics	Men's 400 metres T44	8 September
Silver	Roy Perkins	Swimming	Men's 100 metre freestyle S5	8 September
Silver	David Wagner	Wheelchair tennis	Men's Quad singles	8 September
Bronze	Allison Jones	Cycling	Women's Individual Pursuit C1-3	30 August
Bronze	Cortney Jordan	Swimming	Women's 100 metre backstroke S7	30 August
Bronze	Elizabeth Stone	Swimming	Women's 100 metre butterfly S9	30 August
Bronze	Roy Perkins	Swimming	Men's 50 metre freestyle S5	30 August
Bronze	Scot Severn	Athletics	Men's shot put F52/53	31 August
Bronze	Elizabeth Stone	Swimming	Women's 100 metre backstroke S9	31 August
Bronze	Angela Madsen	Athletics	Women's Shot Put F54/55/56	1 September
Bronze	Kerry Morgan	Athletics	Women's 200 metre T52	1 September
Bronze	Dartanyon Crockett	Judo	Men's 90 kg	1 September
Bronze	Roy Perkins	Swimming	Men's 200 metre freestyle S5	1 September
Bronze	Paul Nitz	Athletics	Men's 100 metres T52	2 September
Bronze	Blake Leeper	Athletics	Men's 200 metres T44	2 September
Bronze	April Holmes	Athletics	Women's 100 metres T44	2 September
Bronze	Joseph Berenyi; Sam Kavanagh; Jennifer Schuble	Cycling	Mixed team sprint C1-5	2 September
Bronze	Oksana Masters; Rob Jones	Rowing	Mixed double sculls TAMix2x	2 September
Bronze	Rebecca Meyers	Swimming	Women's 100 metre freestyle S13	2 September
Bronze	Lantz Lamback	Swimming	Men's 100 metre freestyle S7	3 September
Bronze	Tucker Dupree	Swimming	Men's 100 metre freestyle S12	4 September
Bronze	Joshua George	Athletics	Men's 800 metres T53	5 September
Bronze	Jessica Galli	Athletics	Women's 800 metres T53	5 September
Bronze	Kerry Morgan	Athletics	Women's 100 metres T52	5 September
Bronze	Kelly Crowley	Cycling	Women's road time trial C5	5 September
Bronze	Oscar Sanchez	Cycling	Men's road time trial H4	5 September
Bronze	Susan Beth Scott	Swimming	Women's 400 metre freestyle S10	5 September
Bronze	Noga Nir-Kistler	Swimming	Women's 100 metre backstroke SB5	5 September
Bronze	Allison Jones	Cycling	Women's road race C1-3	6 September
Bronze	Kelly Crowley	Cycling	Women's road race C4-5	6 September
Bronze	Zena Cole	Athletics	Women's discus throw F51/52/53	7 September
Bronze	Shirley Reilly	Athletics	Women's 1500 metres T54	7 September
Bronze	Tucker Dupree	Swimming	Men's 50 metre freestyle S12	7 September
Bronze	Kelley Becherer	Swimming	Women's 200 metre individual medley SM13	7 September
Bronze	Susan Beth Scott; Anna Johannes; Jessica Long; Mallory Weggemann	Swimming	Women's 4 × 100 metre medley relay 34pts	7 September
Bronze	Nicholas Taylor	Wheelchair tennis	Men's Quad singles	7 September
Bronze	Tatyana McFadden	Athletics	Women's 100 metres T54	8 September
Bronze	David Prince	Athletics	Men's 400 metres T44	8 September
Bronze	Kelley Becherer	Swimming	Women's 100 metre breaststroke SB13	8 September
Bronze	Team USA	Wheelchair Basketball	Men's Wheelchair Basketball	8 September
Bronze	Team USA	Wheelchair Rugby	Wheelchair Rugby	9 September

=== Multiple medallists ===
The following Team USA competitors won multiple medals at the 2012 Paralympic Games.

Name	Medal	Sport	Event	Date
Jessica Long	Gold; Gold; Gold; Gold; Gold; Silver; Silver; Bronze	Swimming	Women's 100 metre butterfly S8; Women's 400 metre freestyle S8; Women's 100 metre breaststroke SB7; Women's 200 metre individual medley Women's 100 metre freestyle S8; Women's 4 × 100 metre freestyle relay-34pts Women's 100 metre backstroke S8; Women's 4 × 100 metre medley relay 34pts	30 Aug; 31 Aug; 1 Sept; 5 Sept; 6 Sept; 3 Sept; 4 Sept; 7 Sept
Raymond Martin	Gold; Gold; Gold; Gold	Athletics	Men's 100m T52; Men's 400m T52; Men's 800m T52; Men's 200m T52	2 Sept; 3 Sept; 7 Sept; 8 Sept
Tatyana McFadden	Gold; Gold; Gold; Bronze	Athletics	Women's 400m T54; Women's 800m T54; Women's 1500m T54; Women's 100m T54	3 Sept; 5 Sept; 7 Sept; 8 Sept
Kelley Becherer	Gold; Gold; Bronze; Bronze	Swimming	Women's 50 metre freestyle S13; Women's 100 metre freestyle S13; Women's 200 metre individual medley SM13; Women's 100 metre breaststroke SB13	1 Sept; 2 Sept; 7 Sept; 8 Sept
Victoria Arlen	Gold; Silver; Silver; Silver	Swimming	Women's 100m freestyle S6; Women's 400m freestyle S6; Women's 4 × 100 metre freestyle relay-34pts Women's 50m freestyle S6	8 Sept; 1 Sept; 3 Sept; 4 Sept
Marianna Davis	Gold; Gold; Gold	Cycling	Women's road time trial H1-2; Women's road race H1-3; Mixed Team Relay H1-4	5 Sept; 7 Sept; 8 Sept
Bradley Snyder	Gold; Gold; Silver	Swimming	Women's 100 metre freestyle S11; Men's 400 metre freestyle S11; Men's 50 metre freestyle S11	31 Aug; 7 Sept; 1 Sept
Joseph Berenyi	Gold; Silver; Bronze	Cycling	Men's individual pursuit C3; Men's road time trial C3; Mixed time trial C1-5	31 Aug; 5 Sept; 2 Sept
Shirley Reilly	Gold; Silver; Bronze	Athletics	Women's Marathon T54; Women's 5000 metre T54; Women's 1500 metre T54	9 Sept; 2 Sept; 7 Sept
Allison Jones	Gold; Bronze; Bronze	Cycling	Women's road time trial C1-3; Women's individual pursuit C1-3; Women's road race C1-3	5 Sept; 30 Aug; 6 Sept
Megan Fisher	Gold; Silver	Cycling	Women's road time trial C4; Women's individual pursuit C4	5 Sept; 30 Aug
David Wagner	Gold; Silver	Wheelchair tennis	Men's Quad doubles Men's Quad singles	5 Sept; 8 Sept
Lantz Lamback	Gold; Bronze	Swimming	Men's 50 metre freestyle S7; Men's 100 metre freestyle S7	4 Sept; 3 Sept
Mallory Weggemann	Gold; Bronze	Swimming	Women's 50 metre freestyle S8; Women's 4 × 100 metre medley relay-34 pts	2 Sept; 7 Sept
Nicholas Taylor	Gold; Bronze	Wheelchair tennis	Men's Quad doubles Men's Quad singles	5 Sept; 7 Sept
Oscar Sanchez	Gold; Bronze	Cycling	Mixed Team Relay H1-4; Men's road time trial H4	5 Sept; 8 Sept
Cortney Jordan	Silver; Silver; Silver; Bronze	Swimming	Women's 100m freestyle S7; Women's 50 metre freestyle S7; Women's 400m freestyle S7; Women's 100m backstroke S7	3 Sept; 4 Sept; 6 Sept; 30 Aug
Roy Perkins	Silver; Silver; Bronze; Bronze	Swimming	Men's 50m butterfly S5; Men's 100 metre freestyle S5; Men's 50m freestyle S5; Men's 200m freestyle S5	7 Sept; 8 Sept; 30 Aug; 1 Sept
Tucker Dupree	Silver; Bronze; Bronze	Swimming	Men's 100 metre backstroke S12; Men's 100 metre freestyle S12; Men's 50 metre freestyle S12	5 Sept; 4 Sept; 7 Sept
Susan Beth Scott	Silver; Bronze; Bronze	Swimming	Women's 4 × 100 metre freestyle relay 34pts Women's 400 metre freestyle S10; Women's 4 × 100 metre freestyle relay 34pts	3 Sept; 5 Sept; 7 Sept
Monica Bascio	Silver; Silver	Cycling	Women's road time trial H3; Women's road race H1-3	5 Sept; 7 Sept
Jennifer Schuble	Silver; Bronze	Cycling	Women's 500 metre time trial C4-5; Mixed team spring C1-5	1 Sept; 2 Sept
Blake Leeper	Silver; Bronze	Athletics	Men's 400m T44; Men's 200m T44	8 Sept; 2 Sept
Rebecca Meyers	Silver; Bronze	Swimming	Women's 200 metre individual medley SM13; Women's 100 metre freestyle S13	7 Sept; 2 Sept
Kerry Morgan	Bronze; Bronze	Athletics	Women's 200 metre T52; Women's 100 metre T52	1 Sept; 5 Sept
Elizabeth Stone	Bronze; Bronze	Swimming	Women's 100 metre butterfly S9; Women's 100 metre backstroke S9	30 Aug; 31 Aug
Kelly Crowley	Bronze; Bronze	Cycling	Women's road time trial C5; Women's road race C4-5	5 Sept; 6 Sept

== Archery ==
Men

Athlete	Event	Ranking round		Round of 32	Round of 16	Quarterfinals	Semifinals	Finals	
Athlete	Event	Score	Seed	Opposition score	Opposition score	Opposition score	Opposition score	Opposition score	Rank
Jeff Fabry	Individual compound W1	659	2	—N/a	Bye	Cavanagh (GBR); W 7-1	Murphy (CAN); W 7-3	Drohoninsky (CZE); W 6-2	1st place, gold medalist(s)
Jerry Shields	Individual compound W1	586	10	—N/a	Cavanagh (GBR); L 1-7	did not advance			
Dugie Denton	Individual compound open	656	9	Marecak (SVK); W 6–2	Evans (CAN); W 6–4	Stutzman (USA); L 4–6	did not advance		
Matt Stutzman	Individual compound open	685	1	Bye	Klich (CZE); W 6–5	Denton (USA); W 6–4	Gonzalez (ESP); W 6–4	Forsberg (FIN); L 4-6	2nd place, silver medalist(s)
Russell Wolfe	Individual recurve W1/W2	555	20	Wildeboer (NED); W 6–0	de Pellegrin (ITA); L 0-6	did not advance			
Eric Bennett	Individual recurve standing	604	11	Esposito (ITA); W 6–2	Perrot (FRA); W 6–5	Polat (TUR); W 7-3	Tuchinov (RUS); L 2-6	Oyun (RUS); L 0-6	4

Women

Athlete	Event	Ranking round		Round of 32	Round of 16	Quarterfinals	Semifinals	Finals	
Athlete	Event	Score	Seed	Opposition score	Opposition score	Opposition score	Opposition score	Opposition score	Rank
Lee Ford	Individual recurve standing	417	19	Schett (GER); W 6–5	Yan (CHN); L 6–4	did not advance			

== Athletics ==
Men–track

Athlete	Events	Heat		Semifinal		Final	
Athlete	Events	Time	Rank	Time	Rank	Time	Rank
Zach Abbott	100 m T53	15.82	8 q	—N/a		15.51	8
Zach Abbott	200 m T53	27.71	15	—N/a		did not advance	
Zach Abbott	400 m T53	52.58	11	—N/a		did not advance	
Zach Abbott	800 m T53	1:45.95	7	—N/a		did not advance	
Jordan Bird	400 m T54	49.53	10	—N/a		did not advance	
Jordan Bird	800 m T54	1:38.20	6 Q	—N/a		1:40.17	6
Jim Bob Bizzell	200 m T44	23.64	6 Q	—N/a		28.19	8
Adam Bleakney	5000 m T54	11:48.00	25	—N/a		did not advance	
Adam Bleakney	Marathon T54	—N/a				1:44:16	24
David Brown; Rolland Slade (guide)	100 m T11	11.37	5 q	11.29	5	did not advance	
David Brown; Rolland Slade (guide)	200 m T11	23.54	8 q	23.47	8	did not advance	
Richard Browne	100 m T44	11.33	4 Q	—N/a		11.03	2nd place, silver medalist(s)
Ryan Chalmers	400 m T54	53.63	18	—N/a		did not advance	
Ryan Chalmers	800 m T54	1:45.86	22	—N/a		did not advance	
Ryan Chalmers	Marathon T54	—N/a				1:48:34	28
Chris Clemens	100 m T36	13.02	9	—N/a		did not advance	
Chris Clemens	200 m T36	—N/a				26.68	8
Tobi Fawehinmi	200 m T46	23.29	15	—N/a		did not advance	
Rudy Garcia-Tolson	100 m T42	13.77	10	—N/a		did not advance	
Rudy Garcia-Tolson	200 m T42	—N/a				26.97	9
Joshua George	200 m T53	26.76	9	—N/a		did not advance	
Joshua George	400 m T53	51.44	6 Q	—N/a		51.14	5
Joshua George	800 m T53	1:42.32	4 q	—N/a		1:41.50	3rd place, bronze medalist(s)
Joshua George	1500 m T54	3:15.76	12	—N/a		did not advance	
Joshua George	Marathon T54	—N/a				1:39:56	20
Elexis Gillette; Wesley Williams (guide)	100 m T11	11.05	13	did not advance			
Elexis Gillette; Wesley Williams (guide)	200 m T11	25.42	16	did not advance			
Chris Hammer (runner)	800 m T46	2:04.68	17	—N/a		did not advance	
Chris Hammer (runner)	1500 m T46	4:03.41	8 q	—N/a		4:01.76	9
Chris Hammer (runner)	Marathon T46	—N/a				2:50:30	10
Josiah Jamison; Jerome Avery (guide)	100 m T12	DQ		did not advance			
Josiah Jamison; Jerome Avery (guide)	200 m T12	22.52	7 q	DQ		did not advance	
Blake Leeper	100 m T44	11.34	5 Q	—N/a		11.21	5
Blake Leeper	200 m T44	22.23	3 Q	—N/a		22.46	3rd place, bronze medalist(s)
Blake Leeper	400 m T44	50.63	2 Q	—N/a		50.14	2nd place, silver medalist(s)
Raymond Martin	100 m T52	16.79 PR	1 Q	—N/a		17.02	1st place, gold medalist(s)
Raymond Martin	200 m T52	30.98	1 Q	—N/a		30.25 PR	1st place, gold medalist(s)
Raymond Martin	400 m T52	1:00.33	1 Q	—N/a		58.54	1st place, gold medalist(s)
Raymond Martin	800 m T52	—N/a				2:00.34	1st place, gold medalist(s)
Michael Murray	1500 m T20	—N/a				4:18.78	11
Paul Nitz	100 m T52	17.11	2 Q	—N/a		17.99	3rd place, bronze medalist(s)
Paul Nitz	200 m T52	32.65	4 Q	—N/a		33.31	6
Paul Nitz	400 m T52	1:11.12	8 Q	—N/a		1:15.15	7
Aaron Pike	1500 m T54	3:15.04	9	—N/a		did not advance	
Aaron Pike	5000 m T54	11:33.74	23	—N/a		did not advance	
Aaron Pike	Marathon T54	—N/a				1:36:26	16
Markeith Price	200 m T13	23.55	14	—N/a		did not advance	
Markeith Price	400 m T13	51.11	6 q	—N/a		51.98	8
David Prince	400 m T44	52.29	4 Q	—N/a		50.61 WR	3rd place, bronze medalist(s)
Austin Pruitt	100 m T34	17.86	12	—N/a		did not advance	
Austin Pruitt	200 m T34	30.38	6 Q	—N/a		30.55	5
Josh Roberts	100 m T52	18.36	5 Q	—N/a		18.86	6
Josh Roberts	200 m T52	33.54	8 Q	—N/a		34.44	8
Josh Roberts	400 m T52	1:04.95	5 q	—N/a		1:05.76	4
Josh Roberts	800 m T52	—N/a				2:18.57	8
Krige Schabort	5000 m T54	11:30.85	14	—N/a		did not advance	
Krige Schabort	Marathon T54	—N/a				1:33:05	10
Brian Siemann	100 m T53	15.32	6 Q	—N/a		15.39	6
Brian Siemann	200 m T53	26.78	10	—N/a		did not advance	
Brian Siemann	400 m T53	DSQ		did not advance			
Brian Siemann	800 m T53	1:46.38	9 Q	—N/a		1:43.09	8
Brian Siemann	Marathon T54	—N/a				1:45:51	25
Jerome Singleton	100 m T44	11.46	6 Q	—N/a		11.25	6
Jerome Singleton	200 m T44	23.23	5 Q	—N/a		23.58	5
Shaquille Vance	100 m T42	13.17	8 q	—N/a		13.03	8
Shaquille Vance	200 m T42	—N/a				25.55	2nd place, silver medalist(s)
Jarryd Wallace	400 m T44	53.51	6 q	—N/a		53.90	6
David Brown; Elexis Gillette; Josiah Jamison; Markeith Price	4 × 100 m relay T11–T13	DNF		did not advance			
Richard Browne; Blake Leeper; Jerome Singleton; Jarryd Wallace	4 × 100 m relay T42–T46	—N/a				DQ	
Jordan Bird; Ryan Chalmers; Joshua George; Aaron Pike	4 × 400 m relay T53–T54	3:18.61	6	—N/a		did not advance	

Men–field

Athlete	Events	Result	Rank
Richard Browne	High jump F46	1.80	9
Jeremy Campbell	Discus throw F44	60.05 PR	1st place, gold medalist(s)
Chris Clemens	Long jump F36	4.98	6
Scott Danberg	Discus throw F40	33.78	7
Tobi Fawehinmi	Long jump F46	5.17	10
Tobi Fawehinmi	Triple jump F46	13.58	5
Tanner Gers	Long jump F11	5.24	11
Elexis Gillette	Long jump F11	6.34	2nd place, silver medalist(s)
Elexis Gillette	Triple jump F11	12.39	4
Dennis Ogbe	Shot put F57/58	12.84	12
Dennis Ogbe	Discus throw F57/58	47.15	10
Markeith Price	Long jump F13	6.17	6
Scot Severn	Shot put F52/53	8.26	3rd place, bronze medalist(s)
Scot Severn	Discus throw F51/52/53	22.01	9
Scot Severn	Javelin throw F52/53	17.20	8
Jeff Skiba	High jump F46	2.04	2nd place, silver medalist(s)
Jeff Skiba	Javelin throw F44	49.09	8
Shaquille Vance	Shot put F42/44	12.25	6
Scott Winkler	Shot put F54/55/56	10.35	13

Women–track

Athlete	Events	Heat		Semifinal		Final	
Athlete	Events	Time	Rank	Time	Rank	Time	Rank
Carleigh Dewald	100 m T34	21.77	6 q	—N/a		21.83	7
Carleigh Dewald	200 m T34	40.36	8 q	—N/a		41.53	8
Anjali Forber Pratt	100 m T53	—N/a				17.67	6
Anjali Forber Pratt	200 m T53	—N/a				30.27	5
Anjali Forber Pratt	400 m T53	—N/a				59.34	7
Jessica Galli	100 m T53	—N/a				17.42	4
Jessica Galli	200 m T53	—N/a				29.82	4
Jessica Galli	400 m T53	—N/a				57.56	5
Jessica Galli	800 m T53	—N/a				1:53.12	3rd place, bronze medalist(s)
April Holmes	100 m T44	13.58	3 Q	—N/a		13.33	3rd place, bronze medalist(s)
April Holmes	200 m T44	28.49	4 Q	—N/a		DNS	
Cheryl Leitner	100 m T52	—N/a				21.64	5
Cheryl Leitner	200 m T52	—N/a				42.62	7
Hannah McFadden	100 m T54	18.23	7 q	—N/a		18.02	8
Tatyana McFadden	100 m T54	16.53	4 Q	—N/a		16.15	3rd place, bronze medalist(s)
Tatyana McFadden	400 m T54	53.95	1 Q	—N/a		52.97	1st place, gold medalist(s)
Tatyana McFadden	800 m T54	1:47.66	1 Q	—N/a		1:47.01	1st place, gold medalist(s)
Tatyana McFadden	1500 m T54	3:32.14	3 Q	—N/a		3:36.42	1st place, gold medalist(s)
Tatyana McFadden	Marathon T54	—N/a				1:58:47	9
Amanda McGrory	800 m T53	—N/a				1:54.48	7
Amanda McGrory	1500 m T54	3:42.17	9 Q	—N/a		3:38.19	7
Amanda McGrory	5000 m T54	13:11.78	7 Q	—N/a		12:29.07	7
Amanda McGrory	Marathon T54	—N/a				1:46:35	4
Kristen Messer	100 m T34	22.10	8 Q	—N/a		21.59	6
Kristen Messer	200 m T34	40.45	9	—N/a		did not advance	
Cassie Mitchell	100 m T52	—N/a				20.86	4
Cassie Mitchell	200 m T52	—N/a				37.75	4
Kerry Morgan	100 m T52	—N/a				20.68	3rd place, bronze medalist(s)
Kerry Morgan	200 m T52	—N/a				36.49	3rd place, bronze medalist(s)
Shirley Reilly	400 m T53	—N/a				57.18	4
Shirley Reilly	800 m T53	—N/a				1:54.18	6
Shirley Reilly	1500 m T54	3:42.18	8 Q	—N/a		3:37.03	3rd place, bronze medalist(s)
Shirley Reilly	5000 m T54	13:09.26	6 q	—N/a		12:27.91	2nd place, silver medalist(s)
Shirley Reilly	Marathon T54	—N/a				1:46:33	1st place, gold medalist(s)
Susannah Scaroni	Marathon T54	—N/a				1:58:37	8
Christina Schwab	400 m T54	59.06	9	—N/a		did not advance	
Christina Schwab	800 m T54	1:57.51	14	—N/a		did not advance	
Christina Schwab	5000 m T54	13:33.30	12	—N/a		did not advance	
Christina Schwab	Marathon T54	—N/a				DNF	
Katy Sullivan	100 m T42	—N/a				17.33	6
Amberlynn Weber	100 m T54	18.48	9	—N/a		did not advance	
Amberlynn Weber	400 m T54	1:02.28	12	—N/a		did not advance	
Amberlynn Weber	800 m T54	2:07.99	18	—N/a		did not advance	

Women–field

Athlete	Events	Result	Rank
Zena Cole	Club throw F31/32/51	11.02	11
Zena Cole	Discus throw F51/52/53	5.25	3rd place, bronze medalist(s)
Angela Madsen	Shot put F54/55/56	8.88 PR	3rd place, bronze medalist(s)
Angela Madsen	Javelin throw F54/55/56	21.20	5
Cece Mazyck	Javelin throw F57/58	15.45	14
Cassie Mitchell	Discus throw F51/52/53	12.96	4

== Boccia ==
Individual

Athlete	Event	Seeding matches		Round of 32	Round of 16	Quarterfinals	Semifinals	Final / BM	
Athlete	Event	Opposition Score	Rank	Opposition Score	Opposition Score	Opposition Score	Opposition Score	Opposition Score	Rank
Austin Hanson	Mixed individual BC3	Kato (JPN); W 6–1	—N/a	Gauthier (CAN); L 1-7	did not advance				

== Cycling ==
=== Road ===
Athlete	Event	Time	Rank
Monica Bascio	Women's road race H1-3	1:42.07	2nd place, silver medalist(s)
Monica Bascio	Women's time trial H3	33:39.26	2nd place, silver medalist(s)
Joseph Berenyi	Men's road race C1-3	1:42.51	6
Joseph Berenyi	Men's time trial C3	23:31.73	2nd place, silver medalist(s)
Kelly Crowley	Women's road race C4-5	1:48.34	3rd place, bronze medalist(s)
Kelly Crowley	Women's time trial C5	25:14.51	3rd place, bronze medalist(s)
Alicia Dana	Women's road race H1-3	DNF	
Alicia Dana	Women's time trial H1-2	37:14.18	5
Marianna Davis	Women's road race H1-3	1:41.34	1st place, gold medalist(s)
Marianna Davis	Women's time trial H1-2	31:06.39	1st place, gold medalist(s)
Megan Fisher	Women's road race C4-5	DNF	
Megan Fisher	Women's time trial C4	26:04.39	1st place, gold medalist(s)
Allison Jones	Women's road race C1-3	1:29:11	3rd place, bronze medalist(s)
Allison Jones	Women's time trial C1-3	26:58.54	1st place, gold medalist(s)
Sam Kavanagh	Men's road race C4-5	2:02.17	22
Sam Kavanagh	Men's time trial C4	35:31.12	7
Greta Neimanas	Women's road race C4-5	1:55.57	8
Greta Neimanas	Women's time trial C5	25:25.51	4
Steven Peace	Mixed road race T1-2	49:16	5
Steven Peace	Mixed time trial T1-2	15:57.69	9
Anthony Pedeferri	Men's road race H-1	1:59:40	5
Anthony Pedeferri	Men's time trial H-1	38:21.23	4
Clark Rachfal; David Swanson (pilot)	Men's road race B	2:29:51	10
Clark Rachfal; David Swanson (pilot)	Men's time trial B	31:53.97	8
Oscar Sanchez	Men's road race H4	2:00:35	5
Oscar Sanchez	Men's time trial H4	25:35.26	3rd place, bronze medalist(s)
Jennifer Schuble	Women's road race C4-5	1:54.50	5
Jennifer Schuble	Women's time trial C5	26:32.88	6
Matthew Updike	Men's road race H2	1:45:37	9
Matthew Updike	Men's time trial H2	28:44.82	6
Anthony Zahn	Men's road race C1-3	DNF	
Anthony Zahn	Men's time trial C1	29:18.28	8
Matthew Updike; Oscar Sanchez; Marianna Davis	Mixed Team Relay H1-4	30:07.00	1st place, gold medalist(s)

=== Track ===
Pursuit

Athlete	Event	Qualification		Final	
Athlete	Event	Time	Rank	Opposition Time	Rank
Clark Rachfal; David Swanson (pilot)	Men's individual pursuit B	4:28.030	6	DNQ	
Anthony Zahn	Men's individual pursuit C1	4:38.466	8	DNQ	
Joseph Berenyi	Men's individual pursuit C3	3:36.148 WR	1 Q	McKeown (GBR); W 3:37.912	1st place, gold medalist(s)
Sam Kavanagh	Men's individual pursuit C4	4:58.870	7	DNQ	
Allison Jones	Women's individual pursuit C1-3	4:28.504	4	Schindler (GER); W 4:02.773	3rd place, bronze medalist(s)
Megan Fisher	Women's individual pursuit C4	4:06.599	2	Powell (AUS); L 4:07.147	2nd place, silver medalist(s)
Kelly Crowley	Women's individual pursuit C5	4:02.825	6	DNQ	
Greta Neimanas	Women's individual pursuit C5	4:03.200	7	DNQ	
Jennifer Schuble	Women's individual pursuit C5	4:00.702	5	DNQ	

Sprint

Athlete	Event	Qualification		Quarterfinals	Semifinals	Final	
Athlete	Event	Time	Rank	Opposition Time	Opposition Time	Opposition Time	Rank
Joseph Berenyi; Sam Kavanagh; Jennifer Schuble	Mixed team sprint C1-5	53.174	3 Q	—N/a		Czech Republic (CZE); W 52.749	3rd place, bronze medalist(s)

Time trial

Athlete	Event	Time	Rank
Clark Rachfal; David Swanson (pilot)	Men's 1km time trial B	1:05.280	7
Joseph Berenyi	Men's 1km time trial C1-2-3	1:11.649	10
Anthony Zahn	Men's 1km time trial C1-2-3	1:23.312	28
Sam Kavanagh	Men's 1km time trial C4-5	1:11.678	15
Allison Jones	Women's 500m time trial C1-3	41.887	4
Megan Fisher	Women's 500m time trial C4-5	42.178	9
Greta Neimanas	Women's 500m time trial C4-5	39.621	5
Jennifer Schuble	Women's 500m time trial C4-5	37.941	2nd place, silver medalist(s)

== Equestrian ==
Individual

Athlete	Horse	Event	Total	
Athlete	Horse	Event	Score	Rank
Dale Dedrick	Bonifatius	Individual championship test grade II	64.619	17
Dale Dedrick	Bonifatius	Individual freestyle test grade II	69.150	10
Rebecca Hart	Lord Ludger	Individual championship test grade II	68.286	11
Rebecca Hart	Lord Ludger	Individual freestyle test grade II	73.250	5
Donna Ponessa	Western Rose	Individual championship test grade Ia	69.200	6
Donna Ponessa	Western Rose	Individual freestyle test grade Ia	70.750	8
Jonathan Wentz	Richter Scale	Individual championship test grade Ib	70.348	4
Jonathan Wentz	Richter Scale	Individual freestyle test grade Ib	73.000	5

Team

Athlete	Horse	Event	Test round		Final round		Total	
Athlete	Horse	Event	Score	Rank	Score	Rank	Score	Rank
Dale Dedrick; Rebecca Hart; Donna Ponessa; Jonathan Wentz	See above	Team test	Grade Ia: 70.235	5	124.905	4	417.528	7
Dale Dedrick; Rebecca Hart; Donna Ponessa; Jonathan Wentz	See above	Team test	Grade Ib: 70.364	5	137.381	3	417.528	7
Dale Dedrick; Rebecca Hart; Donna Ponessa; Jonathan Wentz	See above	Team test	Grade II: 69.095	4	139.435	2	417.528	7
Dale Dedrick; Rebecca Hart; Donna Ponessa; Jonathan Wentz	See above	Team test	Grade II: 60.286	19	140.712	1	417.528	7
Dale Dedrick; Rebecca Hart; Donna Ponessa; Jonathan Wentz	See above	Team test	Total:	9	542.433	5	417.528	7

== Football 7-a-side ==
5-a-side football is for vision-impaired athletes. All competitors wear eyeshades to account for varying levels of sight, except for the goalkeeper who may be sighted. 7-a-side football is for cerebral palsy sufferers. Athletes who classify as C5-C8 can take part in this sport, with C5 being most disabled. At least one C5 or C6 player, and no more than three C8 players, may be on the field at a given time.

The following is the United States squad in the football 7-a-side tournament of the 2012 Summer Paralympics.

No.	Pos.	Player	Age	Club
1	GK	Keith Johnson	32
2	DF	Gavin Sibayan	31
3	MF	Jerreme Wade	22
4	MF	Chad Jones	20
5	DF	Bryce Boarman	22
6	DF	Chris Ahrens	28
7	MF	Adam Ballou	20
8	FW	Rene Renteria	24
9	MF	Josh McKinney	33
10	MF	Marthell Vazquez	25
11	MF	Tyler Bennett	20
12	GK	Alex Hendricks	16

Group play

Pos	Team	Pld	W	D	L	GF	GA	GD	Pts	Qualification
1	Ukraine (UKR)	3	2	1	0	17	2	+15	7	Qualified for the medal round
2	Brazil (BRA)	3	2	1	0	12	1	+11	7	Qualified for the medal round
3	Great Britain (GBR)	3	1	0	2	5	10	−5	3	Qualified for the classification round
4	United States (USA)	3	0	0	3	0	21	−21	0	Qualified for the classification round

2012-09-01
14:00

Ukraine	9–0	United States
Shkvarlo 1', 7', 41'; Trushev 10'; Shevchyk 16', 30', 39', 48'; Dutko 32'	Report

Riverbank Arena
Attendance: 11,780
Referee: Hayley Ives (GBR)

2012-09-03
9:00

United States	0–8	Brazil
	Report	Almeida 5', 19'; Guimarães 20', 39' da Silva 33', 55'; Tostes 49', 57'

Riverbank Arena
Attendance: 4,529
Referee: David Davies (GBR)

2012-09-05
16:15

United States	0–4	Great Britain
	Report	Richmond 20'; Fletcher 44'; Diallo 53'; Paterson 60+2'

Riverbank Arena
Attendance: 12,274
Referee: Álvaro Azeredo Quelhas (BRA)

5th–8th place semi-finals

2012-09-07
9:00

Netherlands	5–0	United States
Straatman 16', 33'; Visker 35'; Swinkels 39' (pen.); Kooij 59'	Report

Riverbank Arena
Attendance: 3,848
Referee: Alex Kirkley (GBR)

7th/8th place match

2012-09-09
8:30

United States	1–3 (a.e.t.)	Great Britain
Renteria 20'	Report	Barker 29'; Diallo 70'; Fletcher 74'

Riverbank Arena
Attendance: 10,561
Referee: Barry Huizinga (NED)

== Goalball ==
=== Women's tournament ===
Squad list	Group stage		Quarterfinals	Semifinals	Finals	
Squad list	Opposition Result	Rank	Opposition Result	Opposition Result	Opposition Result	Rank
From: Jen Armbruster; Lisa Czechowski; Amanda Dennis; Asya Miller; Robin Theryoung; Jordan Walters	Sweden; W 5–1	4	China; L 0–5			
From: Jen Armbruster; Lisa Czechowski; Amanda Dennis; Asya Miller; Robin Theryoung; Jordan Walters	Australia; L 1–2	4	China; L 0–5			
From: Jen Armbruster; Lisa Czechowski; Amanda Dennis; Asya Miller; Robin Theryoung; Jordan Walters	Japan; W 3–0	4	China; L 0–5			
From: Jen Armbruster; Lisa Czechowski; Amanda Dennis; Asya Miller; Robin Theryoung; Jordan Walters	Canada; L 0–1	4	China; L 0–5			

Group stage

Team	Pld	W	D	L	GF	GA	GD	Pts	Qualification
Canada	4	3	0	1	6	3	+3	9	Quarterfinals
Japan	4	2	1	1	5	3	+2	7	Quarterfinals
Sweden	4	2	1	1	11	11	0	7	Quarterfinals
United States	4	2	0	2	9	4	+5	6	Quarterfinals
Australia	4	0	0	4	7	17	−10	0	Eliminated

Source: "London 2012 Paralympic Games - Goalball results" (PDF). Paralympic.org. 2012-10-03 – via Goalball.sport.

30 August 2012; 21:00	United States	5 – 1	Sweden	Copper Box, London; Referees: Yasser Oman (EGY), Warrick Jackes (AUS)
30 August 2012; 21:00	Armbruster 3 Czechowski 1 Miller 1	Report	Jälmestål 1	Copper Box, London; Referees: Yasser Oman (EGY), Warrick Jackes (AUS)

1 September 2012; 15:00	Japan	2 – 1	United States	Copper Box, London

3 September 2012; 18:30	United States	3 – 0	Australia	Copper Box, London; Referees: Thomas Baerz (GER), Bulent Kimyon (TUR)
3 September 2012; 18:30	Armbruster 3	Report		Copper Box, London; Referees: Thomas Baerz (GER), Bulent Kimyon (TUR)

4 September 2012; 13:45	Canada	1 – 0	United States	Copper Box, London

Quarter-final

5 September 2012; 09:00	China	5 – 0	United States	Copper Box, London; Referees: Dawna Christy (CAN), Juha Vuokila (FIN)
5 September 2012; 09:00	Chen 2 Wang S. 2 Lin 1	Report		Copper Box, London; Referees: Dawna Christy (CAN), Juha Vuokila (FIN)

== Judo ==
Athlete	Event	Preliminaries	Quarterfinals	Semifinals	Repechage First round	Repechage Final	Final / BM	
Athlete	Event	Opposition Result	Opposition Result	Opposition Result	Opposition Result	Opposition Result	Opposition Result	Rank
Dartanyon Crockett	Men's –90 kg	de Sevricourt (FRA); W 0011-000	Ingram (GBR); L 000-100	Did not advance	N/A	Santos (BRA); W 0201-0001	Kretsul (RUS); W 100-000	3rd place, bronze medalist(s)
Katie Davis	Women's +70 kg	N/A	de Almeida (BRA); L 001-0122	Did not advance	N/A	Bouazong (ALG); L 020–000		
Christella Garcia	Women's -70 kg	N/A	Q Zhou (CHN); L 022–000	Did not advance	N/A	Ruvalcaba (MEX); L 0002-112		
Ronald Hawthorne	Men's -60 kg	Zasyadkovych (UKR); W 0101–101	L Xiadong (CHN); L 100–000	Did not advance	N/A	Quilter (GBR); L 0002–022		
Myles Porter	Men's -100 kg	Bye	Kitazono (JPN); W 000-100	Fedin (RUS); W 0013-0101	N/A	N/A	Choi (KOR); L 0001-100	2nd place, silver medalist(s)
Cynthia Paige Simon	Women's -57 kg	N/A	Herrero (ESP); L 000-101	Did not advance	N/A	N/A	Cete (TUR); L 0002–014	

== Powerlifting ==
Athlete	Event	Total lifted	Rank
Ahmed Shafik	Men's -82.5 kg	NMR	NMR
Mary Stack	Women's +82.5 kg	129 kg	4

== Rowing ==
Athlete(s)	Event	Heats		Repechage		Final	
Athlete(s)	Event	Time	Rank	Time	Rank	Time	Rank
Ronald Harvey	Men's single sculls	5:05.45	2 R	5:08.22	4 FB	5:08.28	2 FB
Oksana Masters; Rob Jones	Mixed double sculls	4:01.00	2 R	4:05.77	1 FA	4:05.56	3rd place, bronze medalist(s)
Eleni Englert; Andrew Johnson; Emma Preuschl; Alexandra Stein; Dorian Weber	Mixed coxed four	3:28.36	2 R	3:27.41	2 FA	3:30.06	6

== Sailing ==
Athlete	Event	Race											Total points	Rank
Athlete	Event	1	2	3	4	5	6	7	8	9	10	11	Total points	Rank
Mark LeBlanc	2.4 mR – 1 person keelboat	3	8	7	5	13	(17) (ocs)	3	3	2	9	CAN	52	6
Jp Creignou; Jen French	SKUD 18 – 2 person keelboat	3	(4)	1	1	3	2	1	4	2	3	CAN	20	2nd place, silver medalist(s)
Tom Brown; Paul Callahan; Bradley Johnson	Sonar – 3 person keelboat	3	6	8	3	2	8	5	10	3	(13)	CAN	48	7

== Shooting ==
Athlete	Event	Qualification		Final	
Athlete	Event	Score	Rank	Score	Rank
Eric Hollen	Men's P1–10 m air pistol SH1	558	14	did not advance	
Eric Hollen	Men's P4–50 m pistol SH1	499	23	did not advance	
Joshua Olson	Men's R3–10 m air rifle prone SH1	595	28	did not advance	
Joshua Olson	Men's R6–50 m rifle prone SH1	587	12	did not advance	

== Sitting volleyball ==
=== Women's tournament ===
Team	Group stage		Quarter-finals	Semi-finals	Finals	
Team	Opposition Result	Rank	Opposition Result	Opposition Result	Opposition Result	Rank
United States	China; L 1–3	2	N/A	Semi-final; Ukraine; W 3–0	Final; China; L 1–3	2nd place, silver medalist(s)
United States	Slovenia; L 0–3	2	N/A	Semi-final; Ukraine; W 3–0	Final; China; L 1–3	2nd place, silver medalist(s)
United States	Brazil; L 0–3	2	N/A	Semi-final; Ukraine; W 3–0	Final; China; L 1–3	2nd place, silver medalist(s)

Roster

The following is the American roster in the women's volleyball tournament of the 2012 Summer Paralympics.

№	Name	Date of birth	Position	2012 club
1	Lora Webster	26 August 1986		
3	Brenda Maymon	4 June 1985		
4	Michelle Gerlosky	20 March 1983		
5	Kathryn Holloway	8 June 1986		
6	Heather Erickson	9 May 1993		
7	Monique Burkland	11 August 1989		
10	Kari Miller	16 April 1977		
11	Allison Aldrich	19 January 1988		
13	Nichole Millage	27 March 1977		
14	Kaleo Kanahele	11 June 1996		
15	Kendra Lancaster	2 July 1987		

Group stage

Pos	Team	Pld	W	L	Pts	SW	SL	SR	SPW	SPL	SPR
1	China	3	3	0	6	9	2	4.500	275	138	1.993
2	United States	3	2	1	5	7	2	3.500	245	187	1.310
3	Brazil	3	1	2	4	4	8	0.500	242	273	0.886
4	Slovenia	3	0	3	3	2	9	0.222	176	260	0.677

31 August 2012; 16:00	China	3–1	United States	ExCeL London, London; Referees: Ute Fischer (GER), Khalid Shanishah (LBA)
31 August 2012; 16:00	(22–25, 32–30, 25–23, 25–17); Report			ExCeL London, London; Referees: Ute Fischer (GER), Khalid Shanishah (LBA)

1 September 2012; 19:00	United States	3–0	Slovenia	ExCeL London, London; Referees: Masoud Yazdan Panah (IRI), France Marcoux (CAN)
1 September 2012; 19:00	(25–8, 25–15, 25–8); Report			ExCeL London, London; Referees: Masoud Yazdan Panah (IRI), France Marcoux (CAN)

3 September 2012; 19:00	United States	3–0	Brazil	ExCeL London, London; Referees: Jung Mal-Soon (KOR), Khalid Shanishah (LBA)
3 September 2012; 19:00	(25–13, 25–20, 25–19); Report			ExCeL London, London; Referees: Jung Mal-Soon (KOR), Khalid Shanishah (LBA)

Semi-final

5 September 2012; 16:00	Ukraine	0–3	United States	ExCeL London, London; Referees: Dominik Raca (CRO), Stephen Giugni (AUS)
5 September 2012; 16:00	(14–25, 13–25, 19–25); Report			ExCeL London, London; Referees: Dominik Raca (CRO), Stephen Giugni (AUS)

Gold medal match

September 7, 2012; 21:00	United States	1–3	China	ExCeL London, London; Referees: Janko Plesnik (SLO), Ute Fischer (GER)
September 7, 2012; 21:00	(25–22, 15–25, 30–32, 15–25); Report			ExCeL London, London; Referees: Janko Plesnik (SLO), Ute Fischer (GER)

== Swimming ==
Men

Athlete	Events	Heats		Final	
Athlete	Events	Time	Rank	Time	Rank
Evan Ryan Austin	100 m freestyle S8	1:05.58	15	did not advance	
Evan Ryan Austin	100 m butterfly S8	1:08.61	14	did not advance	
Evan Ryan Austin	100 m breaststroke SB7	1:27.02	8 Q	1:25.74	6
Evan Ryan Austin	200 m individual medley SM8	2:40.05	15	did not advance	
Cody Bureau	50 m freestyle S9	27:32	13	did not advance	
Cody Bureau	100 m freestyle S9	59.71	13	did not advance	
Cody Bureau	100 m butterfly S9	1:03.66	12	did not advance	
Cody Bureau	100 m breaststroke SB9	1:17.02	14	did not advance	
Cody Bureau	100 m backstroke S9	1:07.16	10	did not advance	
Cody Bureau	200 m individual medley SM9	2:23.09	4 Q	2:24.24	7
Michael Demarco	200 m freestyle S4	4:31.31	11	did not advance	
Michael Demarco	50 m breaststroke SB2	1:02.39	6 Q	1:01.50	5
Michael Demarco	50 m backstroke S3	1:01.04	10	did not advance	
Michael Demarco	150 m individual medley SM3	3:40.66	12	did not advance	
Tucker Dupree	50 m freestyle S12	24.52	3 Q	24.37	3rd place, bronze medalist(s)
Tucker Dupree	100 m freestyle S12	55.10	3 Q	54.41	3rd place, bronze medalist(s)
Tucker Dupree	400 m freestyle S12	4:28.14	3 Q	4:24.51	5
Tucker Dupree	100 m butterfly S12	59.89	2 Q	1:00.15	4
Tucker Dupree	100 m backstroke S12	1:02.36	2 Q	1:01.36	2nd place, silver medalist(s)
Rudy Garcia-Tolson	400 m freestyle S8	4:54.84	10	did not advance	
Rudy Garcia-Tolson	100 m butterfly S8	1:09.94	17	did not advance	
Rudy Garcia-Tolson	100 m backstroke S8	1:17.58	12	did not advance	
Rudy Garcia-Tolson	200 m individual medley SM7	2:35.48	1 Q	2:33.94	2nd place, silver medalist(s)
Dalton Herendeen	400 m freestyle S10	4:20.31	9	did not advance	
Dalton Herendeen	100 m butterfly S10	1:04.20	18	did not advance	
Dalton Herendeen	100 m breaststroke SB8	1:21.96	17	did not advance	
Dalton Herendeen	100 m backstroke S10	1:04.89	11	did not advance	
Dalton Herendeen	200 m individual medley SM10	DSQ		did not advance	
Lantz Lamback	50 m freestyle S7	28.29	1 Q	27.84 PR	1st place, gold medalist(s)
Lantz Lamback	100 m freestyle S7	1:02.33	1 Q	1:01.50	3rd place, bronze medalist(s)
Lantz Lamback	400 m freestyle S7	4:59.47	7 Q	4:56.87	6
Lantz Lamback	50 m butterfly S7	33.76	8 Q	32.97	6
Lantz Lamback	100 m backstroke S7	1:15.49	10	did not advance	
Lantz Lamback	200 m individual medley SM7	2:49.71	7 Q	2:45.54	7
Curtis Lovejoy	50 m freestyle S2	1:10.44	8 Q	1:13.45	8
Curtis Lovejoy	100 m freestyle S2	2:37.15	10	did not advance	
Curtis Lovejoy	200 m freestyle S2	—N/a		5:47.15	8
Curtis Lovejoy	50 m backstroke S2	1:16.06	10	did not advance	
Roy Perkins	50 m freestyle S5	34.16	3 Q	33.69	3rd place, bronze medalist(s)
Roy Perkins	100 m freestyle S5	1:16.78	2 Q	1:14.78	2nd place, silver medalist(s)
Roy Perkins	200 m freestyle S5	2:46.94	3 Q	2:43.14	3rd place, bronze medalist(s)
Roy Perkins	50 m butterfly S5	34.53	1 Q	34.57	2nd place, silver medalist(s)
Roy Perkins	50 m backstroke S5	47.37	14	did not advance	
Michael Prout	100 m freestyle S9	1:07.71	12	did not advance	
Michael Prout	400 m freestyle S9	4:33.91	9	did not advance	
Michael Prout	100 m butterfly S9	1:05.22	13	did not advance	
Michael Prout	100 m backstroke S9	1:07.71	12	did not advance	
Michael Prout	200 m individual medley SM9	2:26.48	11	did not advance	
Ian Jaryd Silverman	50 m freestyle S10	24.64	5 Q	24.64	6
Ian Jaryd Silverman	100 m freestyle S10	54.85	7 Q	54.68	7
Ian Jaryd Silverman	400 m freestyle S10	4:13.48	1 Q	4:04.91 PR	1st place, gold medalist(s)
Ian Jaryd Silverman	100 m butterfly S10	59.77	8 Q	59.93	8
Ian Jaryd Silverman	200 m individual medley SM10	2:17.62	6 Q	2:18.23	7
Bradley Snyder	50 m freestyle S11	26.33	2 Q	25.93	2nd place, silver medalist(s)
Bradley Snyder	100 m freestyle S11	57.18 PR	1 Q	57.43	1st place, gold medalist(s)
Bradley Snyder	400 m freestyle S11	4:33.70	1 Q	4:32.41	1st place, gold medalist(s)
Bradley Snyder	100 m butterfly S11	1:05.06	1 Q	1:05.42	4
Bradley Snyder	100 m breaststroke SB11	1:21.97	8 Q	1:19.48	6
Bradley Snyder	100 m backstroke S11	1:12.01	5 Q	1:09.62	5
Bradley Snyder	200 m individual medley SM11	2:31.29	4 Q	2:29.80	6
Joe Wise	100 m freestyle S10	56.93	16	did not advance	
Joe Wise	400 m freestyle S10	4:18.65	7 Q	4:15.66	5
Joe Wise	100 m butterfly S10	1:05.63	20	did not advance	
Joe Wise	100 m breaststroke SB9	1:16.44	13	did not advance	
Joe Wise	200 m individual medley SM10	2:21.37	12	did not advance	
Justin Zook	50 m freestyle S10	25.22	7 Q	26.00	8
Justin Zook	100 m freestyle S10	58.03	21	did not advance	
Justin Zook	100 m backstroke S10	1:01.11	1 Q	1:00.01 WR	1st place, gold medalist(s)
Evan Ryan Austin; Lantz Lamback; Michael Prout; Ian Jaryd Silverman	4 × 100 metre freestyle relay 34pts	4:01.35	6	3:59.16	6
Justin Zook; Rudy Garcia-Tolson; Lantz Lamback; Ian Jaryd Silverman; Michael Prout^{*} Joe Wise^{*} Cody Bureau^{*}	4 × 100 metre medley relay 34pts	4:30.53	6 Q	4:26.04	6

Qualifiers for the latter rounds (Q) of all events were decided on a time only basis, therefore positions shown are overall results versus competitors in all heats.

Women

Athlete	Events	Heats		Final	
Athlete	Events	Time	Rank	Time	Rank
Victoria Arlen	50 m freestyle S6	35.48	2 Q	35.32	2nd place, silver medalist(s)
Victoria Arlen	100 m freestyle S6	1:14.74 WR	1 Q	1:13.33 WR	1st place, gold medalist(s)
Victoria Arlen	400 m freestyle S6	5:25.19	2 Q	5:20.18	2nd place, silver medalist(s)
Victoria Arlen	100 m breaststroke SB5	1:59.67	9	did not advance	
Kelley Becherer	50 m freestyle S13	27.70	1 Q	27.46	1st place, gold medalist(s)
Kelley Becherer	100 m freestyle S13	1:00.23	1 Q	59.56	1st place, gold medalist(s)
Kelley Becherer	100 m breaststroke SB13	1:22.51	3 Q	1:21.50	3rd place, bronze medalist(s)
Kelley Becherer	200 m individual medley SM13	2:34.00	2 Q	2:30.36	3rd place, bronze medalist(s)
Brickelle Bro	400 m freestyle S8	5:27.15	8 Q	5:20.42	5
Aimee Bruder	200 m freestyle S5	3:58.00	9	did not advance	
Aimee Bruder	50 m backstroke S4	1:03.44	7 Q	1:04.50	7
Jaide Childs	200 m freestyle S5	4:19.35	10	did not advance	
Jaide Childs	50 m butterfly S5	51.57	9	did not advance	
Mckenzie Coan	400 m freestyle S8	5:17.94	4 Q	5:20.57	6 Q
Anna Eames	50 m freestyle S10	29.72	8 Q	29.41	8
Anna Eames	100 m freestyle S10	1:03.37	6 Q	1:02.72	6
Anna Eames	100 m butterfly S10	1:11.61	6 Q	1:10.57	6
Amanda Everlove	50 m freestyle S8	34.02	13	did not advance	
Amanda Everlove	100 m freestyle S8	1:19.38	17	did not advance	
Amanda Everlove	100 m butterfly S8	1:15.82	7 Q	1:18.56	8
Amanda Everlove	100 m backstroke S8	1:28.30	14	did not advance	
Amanda Everlove	200 m individual medley SM8	3:01.31	7 Q	3:00.49	8
Alyssa Gialamas	50 m freestyle S5	47.08	9	did not advance	
Alyssa Gialamas	100 m freestyle S5	1:40.23	9	did not advance	
Alyssa Gialamas	200 m freestyle S5	3:15.22	5 Q	3:15.66	5
Anna Johannes	100 m breaststroke SB8	1:23.66	3 Q	1:23.45	4
Anna Johannes	200 m individual medley SM9	2:40.08	5 Q	2:39.16	5
Cortney Jordan	50 m freestyle S7	33.85	3 Q	33.18	2nd place, silver medalist(s)
Cortney Jordan	100 m freestyle S7	1:13.92	3 Q	1:11.63	2nd place, silver medalist(s)
Cortney Jordan	400 m freestyle S7	5:25.75	4 Q	5:18.55	2nd place, silver medalist(s)
Cortney Jordan	100 m breaststroke SB7	1:56.53	9	did not advance	
Cortney Jordan	100 m backstroke S7	1:27.62	5 Q	1:25.33	3rd place, bronze medalist(s)
Cortney Jordan	200 m individual medley SM7	3:13.79	6 Q	3:08.49	4
Jessica Long	50 m freestyle S8	31.61	2 Q	31.71	5
Jessica Long	100 m freestyle S8	1:06.06 WR	1 Q	1:05.63 WR	1st place, gold medalist(s)
Jessica Long	400 m freestyle S8	4:44.52 PR	1 Q	4:44.28 WR	1st place, gold medalist(s)
Jessica Long	100 m butterfly S8	1:11.14	2 Q	1:10.32	1st place, gold medalist(s)
Jessica Long	100 m breaststroke SB7	1:29.79 PR	1 Q	1:29.28 PR	1st place, gold medalist(s)
Jessica Long	100 m backstroke S8	1:21.75	2 Q	1:18.67	2nd place, silver medalist(s)
Jessica Long	200 m individual medley SM8	2:40.42	1 Q	2:37.09 PR	1st place, gold medalist(s)
Letticia Martinez	50 m freestyle S11	34.91	9	did not advance	
Letticia Martinez	100 m freestyle S11	1:21.64	13	did not advance	
Letticia Martinez	100 m breaststroke SB11	1:37.97	7 Q	1:41.10	8
Letticia Martinez	100 m backstroke S11	1:27.85	10	did not advance	
Letticia Martinez	200 m individual medley SM11	3:14.42	10	did not advance	
Rebecca Meyers	50 m freestyle S13	29.97	8 Q	29.21	5
Rebecca Meyers	100 m freestyle S13	1:03.99	6 Q	1:01.90	3rd place, bronze medalist(s)
Rebecca Meyers	100 m breaststroke SB13	1:25.97	9	did not advance	
Rebecca Meyers	200 m individual medley S13	2:37.35	6 Q	2:30.13	2nd place, silver medalist(s)
Noga Nir-Kistler	50 m freestyle S6	37.40	6 Q	36.83	6
Noga Nir-Kistler	100 m freestyle S6	1:23.75	10	did not advance	
Noga Nir-Kistler	50 m butterfly S6	41.33	9	did not advance	
Noga Nir-Kistler	100 m breaststroke SB5	1:53.35	3 Q	1:50.76	3rd place, bronze medalist(s)
Noga Nir-Kistler	100 m backstroke S6	1:23.75	10	did not advance	
Ileana Rodriguez	50 m freestyle S6	41.14	18	did not advance	
Ileana Rodriguez	100 m freestyle S6	1:31.35	15	did not advance	
Ileana Rodriguez	50 m butterfly S6	45.90	14	did not advance	
Ileana Rodriguez	100 m breaststroke SB5	1:58.42	7 Q	1:57.94	7
Ileana Rodriguez	200 m individual medley SM6	3:51.70	16	did not advance	
Susan Beth Scott	50 m freestyle S10	29.28	5 Q	28.92	5
Susan Beth Scott	100 m freestyle S10	1:03.49	7 Q	1:02.82	7
Susan Beth Scott	400 m butterfly S10	4:40.00	1 Q	4:37.23	3rd place, bronze medalist(s)
Susan Beth Scott	100 m backstroke S10	1:12.95	7 Q	1:12.07	6
Elizabeth Stone	50 m freestyle S9	30.39	8 Q	30.72	8
Elizabeth Stone	100 m freestyle S9	1:05.59	7 Q	1:05.43	6
Elizabeth Stone	400 m freestyle S9	4:53.05	6 Q	5:02.76	8
Elizabeth Stone	100 m butterfly S9	1:11.19	2 Q	1:10.10	3rd place, bronze medalist(s)
Elizabeth Stone	100 m backstroke S9	1:13.28	4 Q	1:12.28	3rd place, bronze medalist(s)
Mallory Weggemann	50 m freestyle S8	32.01	5 Q	31.13 PR	1st place, gold medalist(s)
Mallory Weggemann	100 m freestyle S8	1:10.50	4 Q	1:08.51	4
Mallory Weggemann	100 m breaststroke SB7	1:50.05	7 Q	1:43.62	6
Mallory Weggemann	100 m backstroke S8	1:24.18	6 Q	1:23.36	7
Mallory Weggemann	200 m individual medley SM8	3:03.70	8 Q	2:58.44	6
Colleen Young	50 m freestyle S13	30.57	13	did not advance	
Colleen Young	100 m freestyle S13	1:06.73	10	did not advance	
Colleen Young	100 m breaststroke SB13	1:23.41	4 Q	1:21.72	5
Colleen Young	200 m individual medley SM13	2:41.77	7 Q	2:40.21	7
Susan Beth Scott; Victoria Arlen; Jessica Long; Anna Eames	4 × 100 metre freestyle relay 34pts	—N/a		4:24.57	2nd place, silver medalist(s)
Susan Beth Scott; Anna Johannes; Jessica Long; Mallory Weggemann	4 × 100 metre medley relay 34pts	—N/a		4:54.13	3rd place, bronze medalist(s)

== Table tennis ==
Men

Athlete	Event	Preliminaries		Quarterfinals	Semifinals	Finals	
Athlete	Event	Opposition Result	Rank	Opposition Result	Opposition Result	Opposition Result	Rank
Tahl Leibovitz	Singles class 10	Cabestany (FRA); W 3–0; Karlsson (SWE); W 3-0	2	did not advance			

Women

Athlete	Event	Preliminaries		Quarterfinals	Semifinals	Finals	
Athlete	Event	Opposition Result	Rank	Opposition Result	Opposition Result	Opposition Result	Rank
Tara Profitt	Singles class 1-2	L Jing (CHN); L 0–3; Podda (ITA); L 0–3	3	did not advance			
Pamela Fontaine	Singles class 3	Sook JS (KOR); L 1–3; Muzinic (CRO); L 2–3	3	did not advance			
Pamela Fontaine; Tara Profitt	Team class 1-3	France (FRA); L 1–3	9	did not advance			

== Wheelchair basketball ==
The United States have qualified one men's team and one women's team in wheelchair basketball through their results at the 2010 Wheelchair Basketball World Championship. Competing athletes are given eight-level classification points specific to wheelchair basketball, ranging from 0.5 to 4.5 with lower numbers representing a higher degree of disability. The sum of the classification points of all players on the court cannot exceed 14.

=== Men's tournament ===
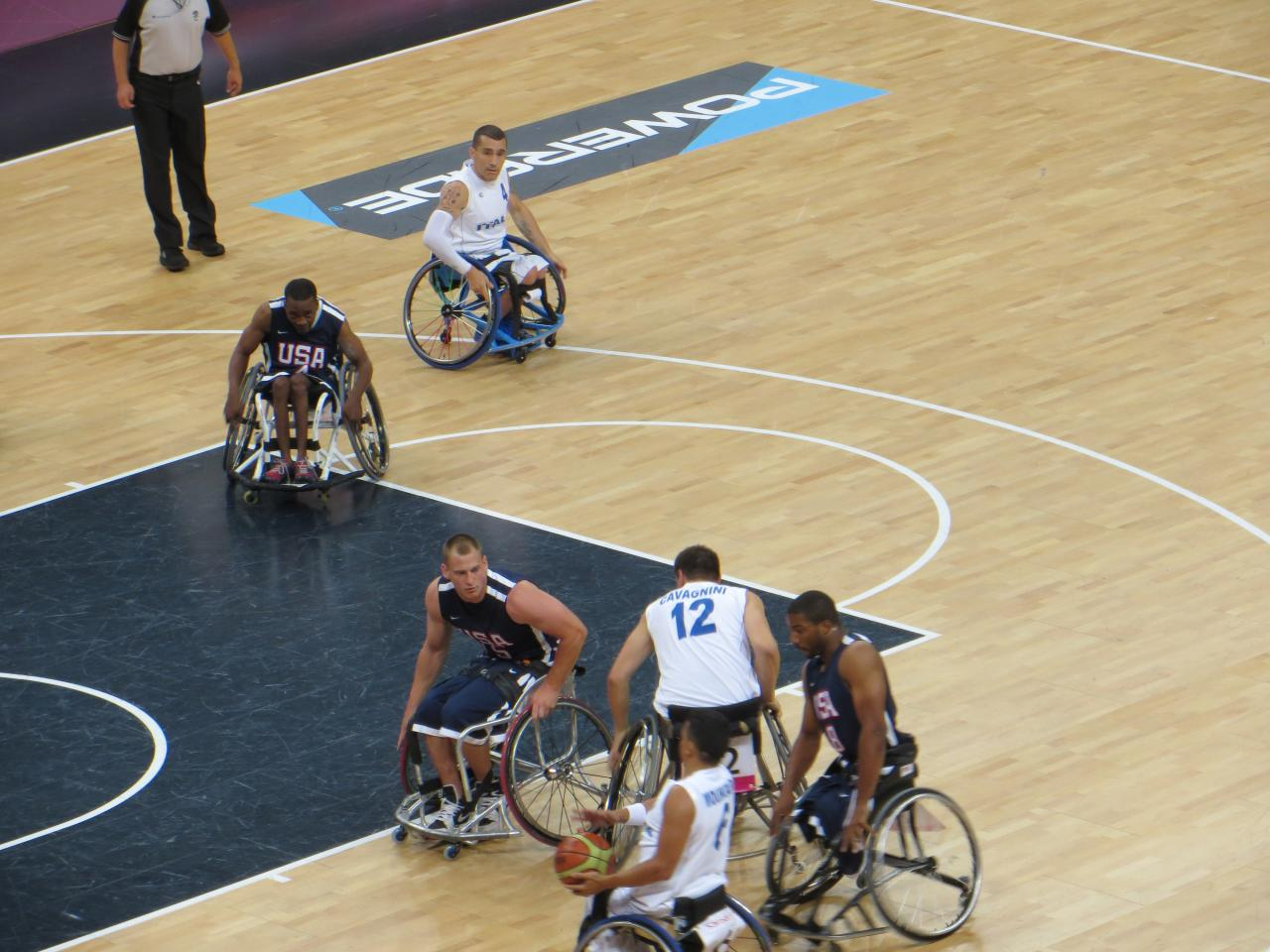
The US men's wheelchair basketball team in action against Italy in the group stage of the tournament.

Squad list (classification points)	Group stage		Quarterfinal	Semifinal	Final	
Squad list (classification points)	Opposition Result	Rank	Opposition Result	Opposition Result	Opposition Result	Rank
From: Eric Barber (1.0); Joseph Chambers (4.0); Jeremy Lade (2.5); Joshua Turek (3.5); Trevon Jenifer (2.5); William Waller (3.0); Matt Scott (3.5); Steven Serio (3.5); Jason Nelms (2.5); Ian Lynch (1.0); Paul Schulte (3.0); Nate Hinze (4.5)	Turkey; L 50–59	3 Q	Germany; W 57–46	Australia; L 63–72	Bronze final Great Britain; W 61–46	3rd place, bronze medalist(s)
From: Eric Barber (1.0); Joseph Chambers (4.0); Jeremy Lade (2.5); Joshua Turek (3.5); Trevon Jenifer (2.5); William Waller (3.0); Matt Scott (3.5); Steven Serio (3.5); Jason Nelms (2.5); Ian Lynch (1.0); Paul Schulte (3.0); Nate Hinze (4.5)	Italy; W 77–51	3 Q	Germany; W 57–46	Australia; L 63–72	Bronze final Great Britain; W 61–46	3rd place, bronze medalist(s)
From: Eric Barber (1.0); Joseph Chambers (4.0); Jeremy Lade (2.5); Joshua Turek (3.5); Trevon Jenifer (2.5); William Waller (3.0); Matt Scott (3.5); Steven Serio (3.5); Jason Nelms (2.5); Ian Lynch (1.0); Paul Schulte (3.0); Nate Hinze (4.5)	South Africa; W 91–29	3 Q	Germany; W 57–46	Australia; L 63–72	Bronze final Great Britain; W 61–46	3rd place, bronze medalist(s)
From: Eric Barber (1.0); Joseph Chambers (4.0); Jeremy Lade (2.5); Joshua Turek (3.5); Trevon Jenifer (2.5); William Waller (3.0); Matt Scott (3.5); Steven Serio (3.5); Jason Nelms (2.5); Ian Lynch (1.0); Paul Schulte (3.0); Nate Hinze (4.5)	Australia; W 49–65	3 Q	Germany; W 57–46	Australia; L 63–72	Bronze final Great Britain; W 61–46	3rd place, bronze medalist(s)
From: Eric Barber (1.0); Joseph Chambers (4.0); Jeremy Lade (2.5); Joshua Turek (3.5); Trevon Jenifer (2.5); William Waller (3.0); Matt Scott (3.5); Steven Serio (3.5); Jason Nelms (2.5); Ian Lynch (1.0); Paul Schulte (3.0); Nate Hinze (4.5)	Spain; W 63–55	3 Q	Germany; W 57–46	Australia; L 63–72	Bronze final Great Britain; W 61–46	3rd place, bronze medalist(s)

Group stage

Team	Pld	W	L	PF	PA	PD	Pts	Qualification
Australia	5	5	0	372	259	+113	10	Quarter-finals
Turkey	5	3	2	331	302	+29	8 (Note: Head-to-head score differential: TUR: +6; USA: −1; ESP: −5)	Quarter-finals
United States	5	3	2	330	259	+71	8	Quarter-finals
Spain	5	3	2	322	292	+30	8	Quarter-finals
Italy	5	1	4	260	309	−49	6	Eliminated
South Africa	5	0	5	204	398	−194	5	Eliminated

Rules for classification: 1) Table points, 2) Head-to-head score differential
Notes:

30 August 2012
10:45

Report

United States	50–59	Turkey
Scoring by quarter: 13–18, 12–13, 20–11, 5–17
Pts: Chambers 17; Rebs: Chambers 9 Asts: Lade 4		Pts: Gezinci 15; Rebs: Gezinci 17; Asts: Gürbulak 15

Basketball Arena, London
Referees: Chris Gregory (GBR)

31 August 2012
15:15

Report

Italy	51–77	United States
Scoring by quarter: 10–13, 20–24, 13–20, 8–20
Pts: Moukhariq 13; Rebs: Cavagnini 9 Asts: Raimondi 5		Pts: Nelms 24; Rebs: Hinze 7 Asts: Serio 6

Basketball Arena, London
Referees: Krunoslav Peić (CRO)

1 September 2012
13:00

Report

United States	91–29	South Africa
Scoring by quarter: 30–10, 25–4, 17–8, 19–7
Pts: Scott 21; Rebs: Hinze 11; Asts: Lade 5		Pts: Nortje 11; Rebs: Nortje 7 Asts: Papenfus 5

North Greenwich Arena, London
Referees: Mauro Retiz (MEX)

2 September 2012
19:00

Report

Australia	65–49	United States
Scoring by quarter: 13–12, 14–8, 18–13, 20–16
Pts: Norris 16; Rebs: Eveson 16; Asts: Eveson 9		Pts: Turek, Nelms 8 Rebs: Jenifer, Scott 7 Asts: Serio 7

North Greenwich Arena, London
Referees: Sergio Giordano (CAN)

3 September 2012
21:15

Report

United States	63–55	Spain
Scoring by quarter: 15–14, 19–10, 16–15, 13–16
Pts: Nelms 21; Rebs: Jenifer 9 Asts: three players 5		Pts: Muiño Gámez 15; Rebs: Romero Martín 7 Asts: De Paz Pazo 5

North Greenwich Arena, London
Referees: Max Kindervater (GER)

Quarter-final

5 September 2012
13:00

Report

Germany	46–57	United States
Scoring by quarter: 11–14, 17–11, 9–12, 9–20
Pts: Bienek 18; Rebs: Bienek 13; Asts: three players 3		Pts: three players 10; Rebs: Turek 8 Asts: Schulte 6

North Greenwich Arena, London
Referees: Christopher Gregory (GBR)

Semi-final

6 September 2012
19:00

Report

Australia	72–63	United States
Scoring by quarter: 18–8, 17–23, 17–14, 20–18
Pts: Eveson 21; Rebs: Eveson 10; Asts: Norris 8		Pts: Chambers 12; Rebs: Lade, Waller 4 Asts: Serio, Schulte 5

North Greenwich Arena, London
Referees: Cris Salguero (ARG)

Bronze medal match

8 September 2012
19:00

Report

United States	61–46	Great Britain
Scoring by quarter: 17–10, 12–10, 10–13, 22–13
Pts: Serio 20; Rebs: Scott 8 Asts: Serio 8		Pts: Bywater 14; Rebs: Bywater 12; Asts: Orogbemi 5

North Greenwich Arena, London
Referees: Matt Wells (AUS)

=== Women's tournament ===
Squad list (classification points)	Group stage		Quarter-final	Semi-final	Final	
Squad list (classification points)	Opposition Result	Rank	Opposition Result	Opposition Result	Opposition Result	Rank
From: Sarah Binsfield (2.5); Sarah Castle (2.5); Jennifer Chew (1.5); Rose Hollermann (3.5); Darlene Hunter (1.0); Mary Allison Milford (1.0); Desi Miller (3.5); Rebecca Murray (2.5); Alana Nichols (2.5); Jennifer Poist (2.0); Natalie Schneider (4.5); Andrea Woodson-Smith (4.0)	China; W 68–65	2 Q	Canada; W 67–55	Australia; L 39–40	Bronze medal match Netherlands; L 47–71	4
From: Sarah Binsfield (2.5); Sarah Castle (2.5); Jennifer Chew (1.5); Rose Hollermann (3.5); Darlene Hunter (1.0); Mary Allison Milford (1.0); Desi Miller (3.5); Rebecca Murray (2.5); Alana Nichols (2.5); Jennifer Poist (2.0); Natalie Schneider (4.5); Andrea Woodson-Smith (4.0)	France; W 63–24	2 Q	Canada; W 67–55	Australia; L 39–40	Bronze medal match Netherlands; L 47–71	4
From: Sarah Binsfield (2.5); Sarah Castle (2.5); Jennifer Chew (1.5); Rose Hollermann (3.5); Darlene Hunter (1.0); Mary Allison Milford (1.0); Desi Miller (3.5); Rebecca Murray (2.5); Alana Nichols (2.5); Jennifer Poist (2.0); Natalie Schneider (4.5); Andrea Woodson-Smith (4.0)	Germany; L 48–54	2 Q	Canada; W 67–55	Australia; L 39–40	Bronze medal match Netherlands; L 47–71	4
From: Sarah Binsfield (2.5); Sarah Castle (2.5); Jennifer Chew (1.5); Rose Hollermann (3.5); Darlene Hunter (1.0); Mary Allison Milford (1.0); Desi Miller (3.5); Rebecca Murray (2.5); Alana Nichols (2.5); Jennifer Poist (2.0); Natalie Schneider (4.5); Andrea Woodson-Smith (4.0)	Mexico; W 67–33	2 Q	Canada; W 67–55	Australia; L 39–40	Bronze medal match Netherlands; L 47–71	4

Group stage

Team	Pld	W	L	PF	PA	PD	Pts	Qualification
Germany	4	4	0	254	158	+96	8	Quarter-finals
United States	4	3	1	246	176	+70	7	Quarter-finals
China	4	2	2	240	204	+36	6	Quarter-finals
Mexico	4	1	3	157	230	−73	5	Quarter-finals
France	4	0	4	132	261	−129	4	Eliminated

30 August 2012
15:15

Report

United States	63–24	France
Scoring by quarter: 20–4, 21–4, 14–10, 8–6
Pts: Murray 23; Rebs: Nichols 6 Asts: Nichols 5		Pts: Quemener-Pichon 7 Rebs: Belz 9 Asts: Glemp-Etavard, Mathias 2

North Greenwich Arena, London
Referees: Carsten Rehling (GER)

31 August 2012
13:00

Report

Germany	54–48	United States
Scoring by quarter: 13–17, 10–6, 10–13, 21–12
Pts: Mohnen 15; Rebs: Mohnen 10; Asts: Mohnen 7		Pts: Schneider, Miller 12; Rebs: Schneider 8 Asts: Murray 7

Basketball Arena, London
Referees: Valerie Farrugia (FRA)

1 September 2012
10:45

Report

United States	67–33	Mexico
Scoring by quarter: 22–9, 10–9, 14–6, 21–9
Pts: Murray 22; Rebs: Murray 7 Asts: Murray 6		Pts: Estrada Bernal 10; Rebs: Estrada Bernal 10; Asts: Estrada Bernal 4

North Greenwich Arena, London
Referees: Eisuke Kanno (JPN)

3 September 2012
13:00

Report

China	65–68 (OT)	United States
Scoring by quarter: 17–11, 11–12, 18–12, 15–26, Overtime: 4–7
Pts: Cheng 22; Rebs: Fu 13; Asts: Long 5		Pts: Murray 30; Rebs: Murray 14; Asts: Murray 8

Basketball Arena, London
Referees: Cristian Roja (ITA)

Quarter-final

4 September 2012
21:15

Report

United States	67–55	Canada
Scoring by quarter: 10–21, 19–12, 16–8, 22–14
Pts: Miller 26; Rebs: Murray 11; Asts: Murray 10		Pts: McLachlan 31; Rebs: McLachlan 13; Asts: Ouellet 6

North Greenwich Arena, London
Referees: Cristian Salguero (ARG)

Semi-final

6 September 2012
13:00

Report

Australia	40–39	United States
Scoring by quarter: 10–12, 16–14, 12–2, 2–11
Pts: three players 8 Rebs: Merritt 6 Asts: three players 3		Pts: Murray 18; Rebs: Murray, Schneider 9 Asts: Murray 3

North Greenwich Arena, London
Referees: Sébastien Gauthier (CAN)

Bronze medal match

7 September 2012
19:00

Report

United States	47–71	Netherlands
Scoring by quarter: 16–16, 8–22, 13–22, 10–11
Pts: Murray 19; Rebs: Murray 6 Asts: Murray 4		Pts: Beijer 27; Rebs: Beijer 9 Asts: Huitzing 11

North Greenwich Arena, London
Referees: Rui Marques (BRA)

== Wheelchair fencing ==
Athlete	Event	Qualification		Round of 16	Quarterfinal	Semifinal	Final / BM	
Athlete	Event	Opposition Score	Rank	Opposition Score	Opposition Score	Opposition Score	Opposition Score	Rank
Gary van der Wege	Men's individual epee A	Demchuk (UKR)	L 4–5	15	—N/a	did not advance		
Gary van der Wege	Men's individual epee A	Andreev (HUN)	L 2–5	15	—N/a	did not advance		
Gary van der Wege	Men's individual epee A	Yusupov (RUS)	L 0–5	15	—N/a	did not advance		
Gary van der Wege	Men's individual epee A	Betti (ITA)	L 0–5	15	—N/a	did not advance		
Ryan Estep	Men's individual epee B	Lemoine (ARG)	W 5–0	11	—N/a	did not advance		
Ryan Estep	Men's individual epee B	Latreche (FRA)	L 2–5	11	—N/a	did not advance		
Ryan Estep	Men's individual epee B	Ali (IRQ)	L 2–5	11	—N/a	did not advance		
Ryan Estep	Men's individual epee B	Tam (HKG)	L 4–5	11	—N/a	did not advance		
Mario Rodriguez	Men's individual foil A	Lemoine (FRA)	L 2–5	15	—N/a	did not advance		
Mario Rodriguez	Men's individual foil A	Andreev (RUS)	L 3–5	15	—N/a	did not advance		
Mario Rodriguez	Men's individual foil A	Osvath (HUN)	L 0–5	15	—N/a	did not advance		
Mario Rodriguez	Men's individual foil A	Chan (HKG)	L 1–5	15	—N/a	did not advance		
Gerard Moreno	Men's individual foil B	Khamatshin (RUS)	L 4–5	14	—N/a	did not advance		
Gerard Moreno	Men's individual foil B	Hu (CHN)	L 2–5	14	—N/a	did not advance		
Gerard Moreno	Men's individual foil B	Szekeres (HUN)	L 0–5	14	—N/a	did not advance		
Gerard Moreno	Men's individual foil B	Chan (FRA)	L 1–5	14	—N/a	did not advance		
Joseph Brinson	Men's individual sabre B	Castro (POL)	L 3–5	14	—N/a	did not advance		
Joseph Brinson	Men's individual sabre B	Kurzin (RUS)	L 3–5	14	—N/a	did not advance		
Joseph Brinson	Men's individual sabre B	Triantafyllou (GRE)	L 0–5	14	—N/a	did not advance		
Joseph Brinson	Men's individual sabre B	François (FRA)	L 1–5	14	—N/a	did not advance		
Catherine Bouwkamp	Women's individual foil A	Wu (CHN)	L 1–5	12	—N/a	did not advance		
Catherine Bouwkamp	Women's individual foil A	Sycheva (RUS)	L 0–5	12	—N/a	did not advance		
Catherine Bouwkamp	Women's individual foil A	Palfi (HKG)	L 0–5	12	—N/a	did not advance		
Catherine Bouwkamp	Women's individual foil A	Zhou (HUN)	L 2–5	12	—N/a	did not advance		
Catherine Bouwkamp	Women's individual foil A	Poignet (FRA)	L 4–5	12	—N/a	did not advance		

== Wheelchair rugby ==
Squad list	Group stage		Quarterfinals	Semifinals	Finals	
Squad list	Opposition Result	Rank	Opposition Result	Opposition Result	Opposition Result	Rank
From: Charles Aoki; Andy Cohn; Chad Cohn; Joe Delagrave; Will Groulx; Derrick Helton; Scott Hogsett; Seth McBride; Jason Regier; Adam Scaturro; Nicholas Springer; Chance Sumner	France; W 70–44	1	N/A	Canada; L 49–50	Bronze Medal; Japan; W 53–43	3rd place, bronze medalist(s)
From: Charles Aoki; Andy Cohn; Chad Cohn; Joe Delagrave; Will Groulx; Derrick Helton; Scott Hogsett; Seth McBride; Jason Regier; Adam Scaturro; Nicholas Springer; Chance Sumner	Great Britain; W 56–44	1	N/A	Canada; L 49–50	Bronze Medal; Japan; W 53–43	3rd place, bronze medalist(s)
From: Charles Aoki; Andy Cohn; Chad Cohn; Joe Delagrave; Will Groulx; Derrick Helton; Scott Hogsett; Seth McBride; Jason Regier; Adam Scaturro; Nicholas Springer; Chance Sumner	Japan; W 64–48	1	N/A	Canada; L 49–50	Bronze Medal; Japan; W 53–43	3rd place, bronze medalist(s)

Team	Pld	W	D	L	GF	GA	GD	Pts	Qualification
United States (USA)	3	3	0	0	190	136	+54	6	Semifinals
Japan (JPN)	3	2	0	1	164	159	+5	4	Semifinals
Great Britain (GBR)	3	1	0	2	140	157	−17	2	Eliminated
France (FRA)	3	0	0	3	150	192	−42	0	Eliminated

5 September 2012
14:00

United States	56 – 44	Great Britain
Aoki 14; Groulx 9 Team 7 McBride 6 Sumner 5 A. Cohn 5 Scaturro 3 Helton 2 Delagrave 2 Regier 1 C. Cohn 1 Springer 1	Report	Phipps 16; Anthony 11; Brown 5 Morrison 5 Barrow 3 Kerr 2 Sehmi 1 Team 1

Basketball Arena
Attendance: 8,273
Referee: Pierre-Alexandre Brière (CAN), Chris van de Riet (NED)

6 September 2012
21:15

Japan	48 – 64	United States
	Report

Basketball Arena
Attendance: 2,959
Referee: Philip Washbourn (NZL), Dave Woods (GBR)

7 September 2012
17:15

United States	70 – 44	France
	Report

Basketball Arena
Attendance: 6,259
Referee: Pierre-Alexandre Brière (CAN), Dave Woods (GBR)

Semi-finals

8 September 2012
16:15

United States	49 – 50	Canada
	Report

Basketball Arena
Attendance: 4,324
Referee: Alexander Schreiner (GER), Chris van de Riet (NED)

Bronze medal game

9 September 2012
12:00

United States	53 – 43	Japan
	Report

Basketball Arena
Attendance: 7,852
Referee: Pierre-Alexandre Briére (CAN), Philip Washbourn (NZL)

== Wheelchair tennis ==
Athlete	Event	Round of 64	Round of 32	Round of 16	Quarterfinals	Semifinals	Final / BM	
Athlete	Event	Opposition Score	Opposition Score	Opposition Score	Opposition Score	Opposition Score	Opposition Score	Rank
Steve Baldwin	Men's singles	Sanada (JPN); L 1–6, 2–6	did not advance					
Jon Rydberg	Men's singles	Ledesma (ARG); W 6–7, 6–3, 6–1	Jérémiasz (FRA); L 6–7, 1–6	did not advance				
Stephen Welch	Men's singles	Mathonsi (RSA); W 6–2, 6–7, 6–1	Gerrard (BEL); L 6–7, 2–6	did not advance				
Noah Yablong	Men's singles	Yusuf (NGR); L 2–6, 3–6	did not advance					
Emmy Kaiser	Women's singles	—N/a	Hwang (KOR); W 6–2, 3–6. 7–5	Shuker (GBR); L 0–6, 2–6	did not advance			
Mackenzie Soldan	Women's singles	—N/a	Vega (COL); W 6–4, 6–0	Buis (NED); L 2–6, 0–6	did not advance			
Bryan Barten	Quad singles	—N/a		Innocenti (ITA); W 6–3, 6–4	Gershony (ISR); L 1–6, 1–6	did not advance		
Nicholas Taylor	Quad singles	—N/a		Kawano (JPN); W 6–1, 7–5	Hard (SWE); W 4–6, 6–4, 6–1	Wagner (USA); L 2–6, 1–6	Bronze final Weinberg (ISR); W 1–6, 6–3, 6–4	3rd place, bronze medalist(s)
David Wagner	Quad singles	—N/a		Sithole (RSA); W 6–1, 7–5	Kramer (ISR); W 6–3, 6–0	Taylor (USA); W 6–2, 6–1	Gershony (ISR); L 3–6, 1–6	2nd place, silver medalist(s)
Steve Baldwin; Noah Yablong	Men's doubles	—N/a	Olsson, Vikstrom (SWE); L 0–6, 1–6	did not advance				
Jon Rydberg; Stephen Welch	Men's doubles	—N/a	Pommê, Santos (BRA); L 6–1, 3–6, 6–7	did not advance				
Emmy Kaiser; Mackenzie Soldan	Women's doubles	—N/a		Ellerbrock, Krüger (GER); L 7–5, 2–6, 5–7	did not advance			
Nicholas Taylor; David Wagner	Quad doubles	—N/a			Bye	Gershony, Weinberg (ISR); W 6–3, 7–6	Lapthorne, Norfolk (ISR); W 6–2, 5–7, 6–2	1st place, gold medalist(s)

== See also ==
- 2012 Summer Paralympics
- United States at the Paralympics
- United States at the 2012 Summer Olympics
