= Swimming at the 2012 Summer Paralympics – Men's 100 metre freestyle S10 =

Event at the 2012 Summer Paralympics

Men's 100m Freestyle S10 at the XIV Paralympic Games
- Venue: London Aquatics Centre
- Dates: 6 September 2012
- Competitors: 21 from 12 nations
- Winning time: 51.07

Medalists
1st place, gold medalist(s)		André Brasil	Brazil
2nd place, silver medalist(s)		Phelipe Andrews Melo Rodrigues	Brazil
3rd place, bronze medalist(s)		Andrew Pasterfield	Australia

The men's 100m freestyle S10 event at the 2012 Summer Paralympics took place at the London Aquatics Centre on 6 September. There were three heats; the swimmers with the eight fastest times advanced to the final.

== Results ==
=== Heats ===
Competed from 11:33.

==== Heat 1 ====
Rank	Lane	Name	Nationality	Time	Notes
1	4	Benoît Huot	Canada	54.46	Q
2	6	Michael Anderson	Australia	54.70	Q
3	3	Dmitry Grigorev	Russia	54.95	Q
4	5	Robert Welbourn	Great Britain	55.45	
5	2	Isaac Bouckley	Canada	56.29	
6	7	Lasse Winther Andersen	Denmark	56.99	
7	1	Shahin Izadyar	Iran	57.91	AS

==== Heat 2 ====
Rank	Lane	Name	Nationality	Time	Notes
1	4	Phelipe Andrews Melo Rodrigues	Brazil	53.21	Q
2	5	Nathan Stein	Canada	54.23	Q
3	3	Lucas Ludwig	Germany	55.71	
4	2	Graham Edmunds	Great Britain	56.01	
5	7	Rick Pendleton	Australia	56.62	
6	1	Joe Wise	United States	56.93	
7	6	Achmat Hassiem	South Africa	57.61	AF

==== Heat 3 ====
Rank	Lane	Name	Nationality	Time	Notes
1	5	Andrew Pasterfield	Australia	53.01	Q
2	4	André Brasil	Brazil	53.02	Q
3	7	Ian Jaryd Silverman	United States	54.85	Q
4	3	David Levecq	Spain	55.15	
5	6	Kevin Paul	South Africa	55.55	AF
6	1	Filip Coufal	Czech Republic	57.17	
7	2	Justin Zook	United States	58.03	

=== Final ===
Competed at 20:20.

Rank	Lane	Name	Nationality	Time	Notes
1st place, gold medalist(s)	5	André Brasil	Brazil	51.07	PR
2nd place, silver medalist(s)	3	Phelipe Andrews Melo Rodrigues	Brazil	52.42	
3rd place, bronze medalist(s)	4	Andrew Pasterfield	Australia	52.77	OC
4	2	Benoît Huot	Canada	53.32	
5	6	Nathan Stein	Canada	53.59	
6	8	Dmitry Grigorev	Russia	54.33	EU
7	1	Ian Jaryd Silverman	United States	54.68	
8	7	Michael Anderson	Australia	54.73	

Q = qualified for final. PR = Paralympic Record. EU = European Record. AS = Asian Record. AF = African Record. OC = Oceania Record.
