= Swimming at the 2012 Summer Paralympics – Men's 100 metre butterfly S10 =

Event at the 2012 Summer Paralympics

Men's 100m Butterfly S10 at the XIV Paralympic Games
- Venue: London Aquatics Centre
- Dates: 1 September 2012
- Competitors: 22 from 14 nations
- Winning time: 56.35

Medalists
1st place, gold medalist(s)		André Brasil	Brazil
2nd place, silver medalist(s)		Dmitry Grigoryev	Russia
3rd place, bronze medalist(s)		Achmat Hassiem	South Africa

The men's 100m butterfly S10 event at the 2012 Summer Paralympics took place at the London Aquatics Centre on 1 September. There were three heats; the swimmers with the eight fastest times advanced to the final.

== Results ==
=== Heats ===
Competed from 09:30.

==== Heat 1 ====
Rank	Lane	Name	Nationality	Time	Notes
1	4	Dmitry Grigoryev	Russia	57.59	Q, EU
2	3	Phelipe Andrews Melo Rodrigues	Brazil	59.16	Q
3	5	Andrew Pasterfield	Australia	59.47	Q
4	2	Pavel Poltavtsev	Russia	1:00.66	
5	6	Lucas Ludwig	Germany	1:00.85	
6	7	Isaac Bouckley	Canada	1:03.42	
7	1	Gonzalo Dutra	Uruguay	1:18.01	

==== Heat 2 ====
Rank	Lane	Name	Nationality	Time	Notes
1	4	David Levecq	Spain	58.40	Q
2	5	Achmat Hassiem	South Africa	58.46	Q, AF
3	6	Ian Jaryd Silverman	United States	59.77	Q
4	3	Lasse Winther Andersen	Denmark	1:00.01	
5	2	Maksym Isaiev	Ukraine	1:03.10	
6	7	Dalton Herendeen	United States	1:04.20	
7	1	Joe Wise	United States	1:05.63	

==== Heat 3 ====
Rank	Lane	Name	Nationality	Time	Notes
1	4	André Brasil	Brazil	58.72	Q
2	5	Mike van der Zanden	Netherlands	59.00	Q
3	6	Nathan Stein	Canada	59.81	
4	3	James Hollis	Great Britain	59.98	
5	7	Rick Pendleton	Australia	1:01.30	
6	2	Robert Welbourn	Great Britain	1:01.96	
7	1	Graham Edmunds	Great Britain	1:05.48	
8	8	Matthew Sultana	Malta	1:16.94	

=== Final ===
Competed at 17:30.

Rank	Lane	Name	Nationality	Time	Notes
1st place, gold medalist(s)	6	André Brasil	Brazil	56.35	PR
2nd place, silver medalist(s)	4	Dmitry Grigoryev	Russia	56.89	EU
3rd place, bronze medalist(s)	3	Achmat Hassiem	South Africa	57.76	AF
4	5	David Levecq	Spain	57.90	
5	7	Phelipe Andrews Melo Rodrigues	Brazil	58.79	
6	2	Mike van der Zanden	Netherlands	59.39	
7	1	Andrew Pasterfield	Australia	59.49	
8	8	Ian Jaryd Silverman	United States	59.93	

Q = qualified for final. PR = Paralympic Record. EU = European Record. AF = African Record.
