= Swimming at the 2012 Summer Paralympics – Women's 100 metre freestyle S13 =

Women's 100m Freestyle S13 at the XIV Paralympic Games
- Venue: London Aquatics Centre
- Dates: 2 September
- Competitors: 16 from 11 nations
- Winning time: 59.56

Medalists
1st place, gold medalist(s)		Kelley Becherer	United States
2nd place, silver medalist(s)		Valerie Grand-Maison	Canada
3rd place, bronze medalist(s)		Rebecca Anne Meyers	United States

The women's 100m freestyle S13 event at the 2012 Summer Paralympics took place at the London Aquatics Centre on 2 September. There were two heats; the swimmers with the eight fastest times advanced to the final.

== Results ==
=== Heats ===
Competed from 10:48.

==== Heat 1 ====
Rank	Lane	Name	Nationality	Time	Notes
1	4	Valerie Grand-Maison	Canada	1:00.48	Q
2	3	Prue Watt	Australia	1:01.61	Q
3	5	Iryna Balashova	Ukraine	1:03.90	Q
4	1	Leticia Freitas	Brazil	1:06.65	
5	2	Colleen Young	United States	1:06.73	
6	6	Elena Krawzow	Germany	1:07.93	
7	7	Begona Curero	Spain	1:08.45	
8	8	Maryia Charniatsova	Belarus	1:10.56	

==== Heat 2 ====
Rank	Lane	Name	Nationality	Time	Notes
1	4	Kelley Becherer	United States	1:00.23	Q
2	5	Rhiannon Henry	Great Britain	1:01.87	Q
3	3	Rebecca Anne Meyers	United States	1:03.99	Q
4	6	Teigan van Roosmalen	Australia	1:04.31	Q
5	2	Rhea Schmidt	Canada	1:05.35	Q
6	7	Marta Maria Gomez Battelli	Spain	1:08.81	
7	1	Marike Naude	South Africa	1:11.45	
8	8	Naomi Ciorap	Romania	1:13.30	

=== Final ===
Competed at 18:41.

Rank	Lane	Name	Nationality	Time	Notes
1st place, gold medalist(s)	4	Kelley Becherer	United States	59.56	
2nd place, silver medalist(s)	5	Valerie Grand-Maison	Canada	1:00.07	
3rd place, bronze medalist(s)	7	Rebecca Anne Meyers	United States	1:01.90	
4	6	Rhiannon Henry	Great Britain	1:02.00	
5	3	Prue Watt	Australia	1:02.32	
6	2	Iryna Balashova	Ukraine	1:04.26	
7	1	Teigan van Roosmalen	Australia	1:04.87	
8	8	Rhea Schmidt	Canada	1:05.26	

'Q = qualified for final.
