= Swimming at the 2012 Summer Paralympics – Women's 100 metre breaststroke SB13 =

Women's 100m Breaststroke SB13 at the XIV Paralympic Games
- Venue: London Aquatics Centre
- Dates: 8 September
- Competitors: 13 from 8 nations
- Winning time: 1:19.19

Medalists
| 1st place, gold medalist(s) | | Prue Watt | Australia |
| 2nd place, silver medalist(s) | | Elena Krawzow | Germany |
| 3rd place, bronze medalist(s) | | Kelley Becherer | United States |

The women's 100m breaststroke SB13 event at the 2012 Summer Paralympics took place at the London Aquatics Centre on 8 September. There were two heats; the swimmers with the eight fastest times advanced to the final.

== Results ==
=== Heats ===
Competed from 10:51.

==== Heat 1 ====
| Rank | Lane | Name | Nationality | Time | Notes |
|---|---|---|---|---|---|
| 1 | 5 | Kelley Becherer | United States | 1:22.51 | Q |
| 2 | 4 | Colleen Young | United States | 1:23.41 | Q |
| 3 | 3 | Teigan van Roosmalen | Australia | 1:24.41 | Q |
| 4 | 6 | Begoña Curero Sastre | Spain | 1:25.12 | Q |
| 5 | 2 | Marta Maria Gomez Battelli | Spain | 1:27.89 | |
| 6 | 7 | Naomi Ciorap | Romania | 1:34.92 | |

==== Heat 2 ====
| Rank | Lane | Name | Nationality | Time | Notes |
|---|---|---|---|---|---|
| 1 | 4 | Prue Watt | Australia | 1:20.36 | Q, OC |
| 2 | 5 | Elena Krawzow | Germany | 1:21.70 | Q, EU |
| 3 | 3 | Valerie Grand-Maison | Canada | 1:25.03 | Q |
| 4 | 6 | Iryna Balashova | Ukraine | 1:25.66 | Q |
| 5 | 2 | Rebecca Anne Meyers | United States | 1:25.97 | |
| 6 | 7 | Rhea Schmidt | Canada | 1:28.57 | |
| 7 | 1 | Marike Naude | South Africa | 1:46.57 | |

=== Final ===
Competed at 19:04.

| Rank | Lane | Name | Nationality | Time | Notes |
|---|---|---|---|---|---|
| 1st place, gold medalist(s) | 4 | Prue Watt | Australia | 1:19.19 | OC |
| 2nd place, silver medalist(s) | 5 | Elena Krawzow | Germany | 1:20.31 | EU |
| 3rd place, bronze medalist(s) | 3 | Kelley Becherer | United States | 1:21.50 | |
| 4 | 8 | Iryna Balashova | Ukraine | 1:21.66 | |
| 5 | 6 | Colleen Young | United States | 1:21.72 | |
| 6 | 7 | Valerie Grand-Maison | Canada | 1:22.16 | |
| 7 | 2 | Teigan van Roosmalen | Australia | 1:24.03 | |
| 8 | 1 | Begoña Curero Sastre | Spain | 1:26.23 | |

'Q = qualified for final. EU = European Record. OC = Oceania Record.
