= Swimming at the 2012 Summer Paralympics – Women's 200 metre individual medley SM13 =

Women's 200m Ind. Medley SM13 at the XIV Paralympic Games
- Venue: London Aquatics Centre
- Dates: 7 September
- Competitors: 11 from 7 nations
- Winning time: 2:27.64

Medalists
1st place, gold medalist(s)		Valerie Grand-Maison	Canada
2nd place, silver medalist(s)		Rebecca Anne Meyers	United States
3rd place, bronze medalist(s)		Kelley Becherer	United States

The women's 200m ind. medley SM13 event at the 2012 Summer Paralympics took place at the London Aquatics Centre on 7 September. There were two heats; the swimmers with the eight fastest times advanced to the final.

== Results ==
=== Heats ===
Competed from 11:39.

==== Heat 1 ====
Rank	Lane	Name	Nationality	Time	Notes
1	4	Valerie Grand-Maison	Canada	2:33.26	Q
2	5	Rhiannon Henry	Great Britain	2:35.83	Q
3	3	Teigan van Roosmalen	Australia	2:37.21	Q
4	6	Colleen Young	United States	2:41.77	Q
5	2	Marta Maria Gomez Battelli	Spain	2:46.90	

==== Heat 2 ====
Rank	Lane	Name	Nationality	Time	Notes
1	4	Kelley Becherer	United States	2:34.00	Q
2	3	Prue Watt	Australia	2:35.45	Q
3	5	Rebecca Anne Meyers	United States	2:37.35	Q
4	6	Iryna Balashova	Ukraine	2:44.03	Q
5	2	Elena Krawzow	Germany	2:46.61	
6	7	Rhea Schmidt	Canada	2:47.67	

=== Final ===
Competed at 20:24.

Rank	Lane	Name	Nationality	Time	Notes
1st place, gold medalist(s)	4	Valerie Grand-Maison	Canada	2:27.64	WR
2nd place, silver medalist(s)	7	Rebecca Anne Meyers	United States	2:30.13	
3rd place, bronze medalist(s)	5	Kelley Becherer	United States	2:30.36	
4	6	Rhiannon Henry	Great Britain	2:32.84	
5	3	Prue Watt	Australia	2:34.77	
6	2	Teigan van Roosmalen	Australia	2:35.61	
7	1	Colleen Young	United States	2:40.21	
8	8	Iryna Balashova	Ukraine	2:41.45	

'Q = qualified for final. WR = World Record.
