= Cycling at the 2012 Summer Paralympics – Women's individual pursuit C4 =

Cycling, Women's Ind. Pursuit C4 at the XIV Paralympic Games
- Venue: ExCeL Exhibition Centre
- Dates: August 30
- Competitors: 6 from 5 nations

Medalists
| 1st place, gold medalist(s) | | Susan Powell | Australia |
| 2nd place, silver medalist(s) | | Megan Fisher | United States |
| 3rd place, bronze medalist(s) | | Alexandra Green | Australia |

The Women's Individual Pursuit C4 track cycling event at the 2012 Summer Paralympics took place on August 30 at London Velopark. The race distance was 3 km.

== Preliminaries ==
Q = Qualifier WR = World Record

| Rank | Name | Country | Time |
|---|---|---|---|
| 1 | Susan Powell | Australia | 4:03.306 Q WR |
| 2 | Megan Fisher | United States | 4:06.599 Q |
| 3 | Alexandra Green | Australia | 4:07.152 Q |
| 4 | Marie-Claude Molnar | Canada | 4:11.678 Q |
| 5 | Ruan Jianping | China | 4:13.766 |
| 6 | Roxanne Burns | South Africa | 4:40.874 |

== Finals ==
Gold medal match

| Name | Time | Rank |
|---|---|---|
| Susan Powell (AUS) | 4:05.200 | 1st place, gold medalist(s) |
| Megan Fisher (USA) | 4:07.147 | 2nd place, silver medalist(s) |

Bronze medal match

| Name | Time | Rank |
|---|---|---|
| Alexandra Green (AUS) | 4:07.921 | 3rd place, bronze medalist(s) |
| Marie-Claude Molnar (CAN) | 4:12.398 | 4 |
