= Swimming at the 2012 Summer Paralympics – Men's 400 metre freestyle S10 =

Event at the 2012 Summer Paralympics

Men's 400m Freestyle S10 at the XIV Paralympic Games
- Venue: London Aquatics Centre
- Dates: 5 September 2012
- Competitors: 12 from 8 nations
- Winning time: 4:04.91

Medalists
1st place, gold medalist(s)		Ian Jaryd Silverman	United States
2nd place, silver medalist(s)		Benoît Huot	Canada
3rd place, bronze medalist(s)		Robert Welbourn	Great Britain

The men's 400m freestyle S10 event at the 2012 Summer Paralympics took place at the London Aquatics Centre on 5 September. There were two heats; the swimmers with the eight fastest times advanced to the final.

== Results ==
=== Heats ===
Competed from 09:57.

==== Heat 1 ====
Rank	Lane	Name	Nationality	Time	Notes
1	5	Ian Jaryd Silverman	United States	4:13.48	Q
2	4	Benoît Huot	Canada	4:15.22	Q
3	2	Kevin Paul	South Africa	4:19.64	Q, AF
4	7	Dalton Herendeen	United States	4:20.31	
5	6	Mike van der Zanden	Netherlands	4:21.12	
6	3	Maksym Isaiev	Ukraine	4:22.70	

==== Heat 2 ====
Rank	Lane	Name	Nationality	Time	Notes
1	2	Isaac Bouckley	Canada	4:16.97	Q
2	3	Lucas Ludwig	Germany	4:16.98	Q
3	5	Robert Welbourn	Great Britain	4:17.13	Q
4	4	André Brasil	Brazil	4:17.15	Q
5	6	Joe Wise	United States	4:18.65	Q
6	7	Achmat Hassiem	South Africa	4:27.86	

=== Final ===
Competed at 17:48.

Rank	Lane	Name	Nationality	Time	Notes
1st place, gold medalist(s)	4	Ian Jaryd Silverman	United States	4:04.91	PR
2nd place, silver medalist(s)	5	Benoît Huot	Canada	4:06.58	
3rd place, bronze medalist(s)	2	Robert Welbourn	Great Britain	4:08.18	
4	7	André Brasil	Brazil	4:11.23	
5	1	Joe Wise	United States	4:15.66	
6	6	Lucas Ludwig	Germany	4:16.30	
7	8	Kevin Paul	South Africa	4:16.46	AF
8	3	Isaac Bouckley	Canada	4:18.53	

Q = qualified for final. PR = Paralympic Record. AF = African Record.
