= Swimming at the 2012 Summer Paralympics – Men's 200 metre individual medley SM10 =

Event at the 2012 Summer Paralympics

Men's 200m Individual Medley SM10 at the XIV Paralympic Games
- Venue: London Aquatics Centre
- Dates: 30 August 2012
- Competitors: 16 from 12 nations

Medalists
1st place, gold medalist(s)		Benoit Huot	Canada
2nd place, silver medalist(s)		Andre Brasil	Brazil
3rd place, bronze medalist(s)		Rick Pendleton	Australia

The Men's 200m Individual Medley SM10 event at the 2012 Paralympic Games took place on 30 August 2012 at the London Aquatics Centre.

== Heats ==
=== Heat 1 ===
Rank	Lane	Name	Nationality	Time	Notes
1	5	Kevin Paul	South Africa	2:14.97	Q, AF
2	4	Andre Brasil	Brazil	2:16.25	Q
3	7	Ian Jaryd Silverman	United States	2:17.62	Q
4	3	Lucas Ludwig	Germany	2:18.37	Q
5	6	Dmitry Grigorev	Russia	2:18.91	
6	1	Joe Wise	United States	2:21.37	
7	8	Shahin Izadyar	Iran	2:28.51	
	2	Dalton Herendeen	United States	DSQ	

=== Heat 2 ===
Rank	Lane	Name	Nationality	Time	Notes
1	4	Benoit Huot	Canada	2:13.87	Q
2	3	Rick Pendleton	Australia	2:17.17	Q
3	5	Sven Decaesstecker	Belgium	2:17.57	Q
4	2	Isaac Bouckley	Canada	2:18.33	Q
5	6	Robert Welbourn	Great Britain	2:19.80	
6	7	Jack Bridge	Great Britain	2:21.35	
7	8	Filip Coufal	Czech Republic	2:23.21	
8	1	Lasse Winther Andersen	Denmark	2:25.36	

== Final ==
Rank	Lane	Name	Nationality	Time	Notes
1st place, gold medalist(s)	4	Benoit Huot	Canada	2:10.01	WR
2nd place, silver medalist(s)	3	Andre Brasil	Brazil	2:12.36	
3rd place, bronze medalist(s)	6	Rick Pendleton	Australia	2:14.77	
4	5	Kevin Paul	South Africa	2:15.26	
5	2	Sven Decaesstecker	Belgium	2:15.99	
6	8	Lucas Ludwig	Germany	2:17.31	
7	7	Ian Jaryd Silverman	United States	2:18.23	
	1	Isaac Bouckley	Canada	DSQ	
