= Swimming at the 2012 Summer Paralympics – Women's 100 metre breaststroke SB5 =

2012 swimming competition

Women's 100m Breaststroke SB5 at the XIV Paralympic Games
- Venue: London Aquatics Centre
- Dates: 5 September
- Competitors: 14 from 9 nations
- Winning time: 1:35.50

Medalists
1st place, gold medalist(s)		Kirsten Bruhn	Germany
2nd place, silver medalist(s)		Song Lingling	China
3rd place, bronze medalist(s)		Noga Nir-Kistler	United States

The women's 100m breaststroke SB5 event at the 2012 Summer Paralympics took place at the London Aquatics Centre on 5 September. There were two heats; the swimmers with the eight fastest times advanced to the final.

== Results ==
=== Heats ===
Competed from 10:36.

==== Heat 1 ====
Rank	Lane	Name	Nationality	Time	Notes
1	5	Verena Schott	Germany	1:54.34	Q
2	2	Sabine Weber-Treiber	Austria	1:56.99	Q
3	3	Ileana Rodriguez	United States	1:58.42	Q
4	4	Victoria Arlen	United States	1:59.67	
5	6	Julia Castello Farre	Spain	2:01.18	
6	1	Thi Bich Nhu Trinh	Vietnam	2:11.80	
7	7	Maga Hovakimyan	Armenia	2:21.88	

==== Heat 2 ====
Rank	Lane	Name	Nationality	Time	Notes
1	4	Kirsten Bruhn	Germany	1:35.03	Q, PR
2	5	Song Lingling	China	1:49.19	Q, AS
3	3	Noga Nir-Kistler	United States	1:53.35	Q, AM
4	2	Gitta Raczko	Hungary	1:57.39	Q
5	6	Fanni Illes	Hungary	1:58.83	Q
6	7	Valerie Drapeau	Canada	2:07.70	
7	1	Thi-Lan du	Vietnam	2:12.49	

=== Final ===
Competed at 18:31.

Rank	Lane	Name	Nationality	Time	Notes
1st place, gold medalist(s)	4	Kirsten Bruhn	Germany	1:35.50	
2nd place, silver medalist(s)	5	Song Lingling	China	1:47.19	AS
3rd place, bronze medalist(s)	3	Noga Nir-Kistler	United States	1:50.76	AM
4	2	Sabine Weber-Treiber	Austria	1:51.96	
5	6	Verena Schott	Germany	1:53.09	
6	7	Gitta Raczko	Hungary	1:56.61	
7	1	Ileana Rodriguez	United States	1:57.94	
8	8	Fanni Illes	Hungary	1:59.47	

'Q = qualified for final. PR = Paralympic Record. AM = Americas Record. AS = Asian Record.
