= Swimming at the 2012 Summer Paralympics – Women's 200 metre individual medley SM8 =

Event at the 2012 Summer Paralympics

Women's 200m Ind. Medley SM8 at the XIV Paralympic Games
- Venue: London Aquatics Centre
- Dates: 5 September
- Competitors: 13 from 9 nations
- Winning time: 2:37.09

Medalists
1st place, gold medalist(s)		Jessica Long	United States
2nd place, silver medalist(s)		Olesya Vladykina	Russia
3rd place, bronze medalist(s)		Jiang Shengnan	China

The women's 200m ind. medley SM8 event at the 2012 Summer Paralympics took place at the London Aquatics Centre on 5 September. There were two heats; the swimmers with the eight fastest times advanced to the final.

== Results ==
=== Heats ===
Competed from 09:45.

==== Heat 1 ====
Rank	Lane	Name	Nationality	Time	Notes
1	4	Olesya Vladykina	Russia	2:48.69	Q
2	3	Lu Weiyuan	China	2:54.45	Q
3	5	Jiang Shengnan	China	2:54.52	Q
4	2	Immacolata Cerasuolo	Italy	3:05.67	
5	7	Camille Bérubé	Canada	3:20.68	
6	6	Emma Hollis	Great Britain	3:28.90	

==== Heat 2 ====
Rank	Lane	Name	Nationality	Time	Notes
1	4	Jessica Long	United States	2:40.42	Q, PR
2	6	Stefanie Weinberg	Germany	2:57.49	Q
3	2	Maddison Elliott	Australia	2:59.33	Q
4	3	Amanda Everlove	United States	3:01.31	Q
5	5	Mallory Weggemann	United States	3:03.70	Q
6	7	Amalie Vinther	Denmark	3:15.24	
7	1	Julia Kabus	Germany	3:22.28	

=== Final ===
Competed at 17:39.

Rank	Lane	Name	Nationality	Time	Notes
1st place, gold medalist(s)	4	Jessica Long	United States	2:37.09	PR
2nd place, silver medalist(s)	5	Olesya Vladykina	Russia	2:41.79	
3rd place, bronze medalist(s)	6	Jiang Shengnan	China	2:49.47	AS
4	3	Lu Weiyuan	China	2:52.66	
5	2	Stefanie Weinberg	Germany	2:57.20	
6	8	Mallory Weggemann	United States	2:58.44	
7	7	Maddison Elliott	Australia	2:59.26	
8	1	Amanda Everlove	United States	3:00.49	

'Q = qualified for final. PR = Paralympic Record. AS = Asian Record.
