= Swimming at the 2012 Summer Paralympics – Women's 50 metre freestyle S13 =

Women's 50 metre freestyle S13 at the XIV Paralympic Games
- Venue: London Aquatics Centre
- Dates: 1 September
- Competitors: 15 from 11 nations

Medalists
1st place, gold medalist(s)		Kelley Becherer	United States
2nd place, silver medalist(s)		Valerie Grand-Maison	Canada
3rd place, bronze medalist(s)		Prue Watt	Australia

The women's 50 metre freestyle S13 event at the 2012 Paralympic Games took place on 1 September, at the London Aquatics Centre.

Two heats were held, one with seven swimmers and one with eight competitors. The swimmers with the eight fastest times advanced to the final.

== Heats ==
Rank	Heat	Lane	Name	Nationality	Time	Notes
1	2	4	Kelley Becherer	United States	27.70	Q, AM
2	1	5	Prue Watt	Australia	27.75	Q, OC
3	1	4	Valerie Grand-Maison	Canada	28.33	Q
4	2	5	Iryna Balashova	Ukraine	28.87	Q
5	2	3	Rhiannon Henry	Great Britain	29.06	Q
6	1	3	Teigan van Roosmalen	Australia	29.40	Q
7	1	2	Elena Krawzow	Germany	29.65	Q
8	2	6	Rebecca Anne Meyers	United States	29.97	Q
9	1	6	Rhea Schmidt	Canada	30.07	
10	1	7	Leticia Freitas	Brazil	30.16	
11	2	2	Begona Curero	Spain	30.45	
12	2	7	Colleen Young	United States	30.57	
13	2	1	Maryia Charniatsova	Belarus	30.63	
14	2	8	Marike Naude	South Africa	32.07	
15	1	1	Naomi Ciorap	Romania	32.53	

== Final ==
Rank	Lane	Name	Nationality	Time	Notes
1st place, gold medalist(s)	4	Kelley Becherer	United States	27.46	AM
2nd place, silver medalist(s)	3	Valerie Grand-Maison	Canada	27.91	
3rd place, bronze medalist(s)	5	Prue Watt	Australia	27.94	
4	6	Iryna Balashova	Ukraine	28.66	
5	8	Rebecca Anne Meyers	United States	29.21	
6	7	Teigan van Roosmalen	Australia	29.40	
7	2	Rhiannon Henry	Great Britain	29.41	
8	1	Elena Krawzow	Germany	29.46	
