= Cycling at the 2012 Summer Paralympics – Women's road time trial C1–3 =

Cycling, women's road time trial C1–3 at the XIV Paralympic Games
- Venue: Brands Hatch
- Dates: 5 September 2012
- Competitors: 9 from 7 nations

Medalists
| 1st place, gold medalist(s) | | Allison Jones | United States |
| 2nd place, silver medalist(s) | | Tereza Diepoldova | Czech Republic |
| 3rd place, bronze medalist(s) | | Zeng Sini | China |

The women's time trial C1–3 road cycling event in cycling at the 2012 Summer Paralympics took place on 5 September at Brands Hatch. Nine riders from seven different nations competed.

== Results ==
| Rank | Name | Country | Class | Factored time |
|---|---|---|---|---|
| 1st place, gold medalist(s) | Allison Jones | United States | C2 | 26:58.54 |
| 2nd place, silver medalist(s) | Tereza Diepoldova | Czech Republic | C2 | 27:47.91 |
| 3rd place, bronze medalist(s) | Zeng Sini | China | C2 | 27:57.16 |
| 4 | Denise Schindler | Germany | C3 | 28:45.36 |
| 5 | He Yin | China | C2 | 29:28.07 |
| 6 | Raquel Acinas Poncelas | Spain | C2 | 29:34.55 |
| 7 | Jayme Paris | Australia | C1 | 30:52.13 |
| 8 | Anita Ruetz | Austria | C2 | 31:05.05 |
| 9 | Simone Kennedy | Australia | C3 | 33:59.02 |
