= Swimming at the 2012 Summer Paralympics – Women's 50 metre freestyle S8 =

Women's 50 metre freestyle S8 at the XIV Paralympic Games
- Venue: London Aquatics Centre
- Dates: 2 September
- Competitors: 17 from 12 nations

Medalists
1st place, gold medalist(s)		Mallory Weggemann	United States
2nd place, silver medalist(s)		Maddison Elliott	Australia
3rd place, bronze medalist(s)		Jiang Shengnan	China

The women's 50 metre freestyle S8 event at the 2012 Paralympic Games took place on 2 September, at the London Aquatics Centre.

Three heats were held, one with five swimmers, two with six competitors each. The swimmers with the eight fastest times advanced to the final.

== Heats ==
Rank	Heat	Lane	Name	Nationality	Time	Notes
1	2	6	Maddison Elliott	Australia	31.57	Q, OC
2	2	5	Jessica Long	United States	31.61	Q, AM
3	3	4	Jiang Shengnan	China	31.81	Q
4	2	4	Olesya Vladykina	Russia	31.93	Q
5	3	5	Mallory Weggemann	United States	32.01	Q
6	1	4	Heather Frederiksen	Great Britain	32.34	Q
7	3	2	Kateryna Istomina	Ukraine	32.39	Q
8	3	6	Morgan Bird	Canada	32.67	Q
9	2	3	Stefanie Weinberg	Germany	32.68	
10	3	3	Ksenia Sogomonyan	Russia	32.92	
11	1	5	Chen Zhonglan	China	32.96	
12	1	6	Amalie Vinther	Denmark	33.10	
13	1	3	Amanda Everlove	United States	34.02	
14	2	7	Immacolata Cerasuolo	Italy	34.53	
15	2	2	Romy Pansters	Netherlands	34.66	
16	3	7	Julia Kabus	Germany	35.00	
17	1	2	Mariann Vestbostad	Norway	35.25	

== Final ==
Rank	Lane	Name	Nationality	Time	Notes
1st place, gold medalist(s)	2	Mallory Weggemann	United States	31.13	PR
2nd place, silver medalist(s)	4	Maddison Elliott	Australia	31.44	OC
3rd place, bronze medalist(s)	3	Jiang Shengnan	China	31.55	
4	6	Olesya Vladykina	Russia	31.59	
5	5	Jessica Long	United States	31.71	
6	7	Heather Frederiksen	Great Britain	31.93	
7	1	Kateryna Istomina	Ukraine	32.05	
8	8	Morgan Bird	Canada	32.70	
