= Swimming at the 2012 Summer Paralympics – Women's 100 metre backstroke S8 =

Women's 100m Backstroke S8 at the XIV Paralympic Games
- Venue: London Aquatics Centre
- Dates: 4 September
- Competitors: 15 from 9 nations
- Winning time: 1:17.00

Medalists
1st place, gold medalist(s)		Heather Frederiksen	Great Britain
2nd place, silver medalist(s)		Jessica Long	United States
3rd place, bronze medalist(s)		Olesya Vladykina	Russia

The women's 100m backstroke S8 event at the 2012 Summer Paralympics took place at the London Aquatics Centre on 4 September. There were two heats; the swimmers with the eight fastest times advanced to the final.

== Results ==
=== Heats ===
Competed from 09:38.

==== Heat 1 ====
Rank	Lane	Name	Nationality	Time	Notes
1	4	Jessica Long	United States	1:21.75	Q
2	5	Olesya Vladykina	Russia	1:21.82	Q
3	3	Jin Xiaoqin	China	1:23.46	Q
4	6	Mallory Weggemann	United States	1:24.18	Q
5	2	Maddison Elliott	Australia	1:24.34	Q
6	7	Ksenia Sogomonyan	Russia	1:27.57	
7	1	Guan Xiangnan	China	1:27.62	

==== Heat 2 ====
Rank	Lane	Name	Nationality	Time	Notes
1	4	Heather Frederiksen	Great Britain	1:17.63	Q
2	5	Mariann Vestbostad	Norway	1:23.05	Q
3	3	Lu Weiyuan	China	1:24.31	Q
4	2	Stefanie Weinberg	Germany	1:24.71	
5	1	Kateryna Istomina	Ukraine	1:26.78	
6	7	Camille Bérubé	Canada	1:26.96	
7	6	Amanda Everlove	United States	1:28.30	
	8	Sarah Mailhot	Canada	DNS	

=== Final ===
Competed at 17:37.

Rank	Lane	Name	Nationality	Time	Notes
1st place, gold medalist(s)	4	Heather Frederiksen	Great Britain	1:17.00	
2nd place, silver medalist(s)	5	Jessica Long	United States	1:18.67	
3rd place, bronze medalist(s)	3	Olesya Vladykina	Russia	1:20.20	
4	6	Mariann Vestbostad	Norway	1:22.17	
5	2	Jin Xiaoqin	China	1:22.99	
6	8	Maddison Elliott	Australia	1:23.25	
7	7	Mallory Weggemann	United States	1:23.36	
8	1	Lu Weiyuan	China	1:23.56	

'Q = qualified for final. DNS = Did not start.
