= Jiang Shengnan =

Chinese Paralympic swimmer

Personal information
- Nationality: Chinese
- Born: June 25, 1991 (age 35)

Sport
- Sport: Swimming
Medal record
Representing China
Women's Paralympic swimming
Summer Paralympics
Bronze medal – third place	2012 London	50 m freestyle S8
Bronze medal – third place	2012 London	100 m butterfly S8
Bronze medal – third place	2012 London	200 metre ind. medley SM8
Gold medal – first place	2016 Rio de Janeiro	Mixed 4 × 50 m freestyle relay 20pts
Bronze medal – third place	2016 Rio de Janeiro	50 m freestyle S8
World Championships
Bronze medal – third place	2023 Manchester	50 m freestyle S8
Bronze medal – third place	2023 Manchester	100 m butterfly S8

Jiang Shengnan (born June 25, 1991) is a Chinese Paralympic swimmer.

== Career ==
At the 2012 Summer Paralympics she won three bronze medals: at the Women's 50 metre freestyle S8 event, at the Women's 100 metre butterfly S8 event and at the Women's 200 metre individual medley SM8 event.

At the 2016 Summer Paralympics she won a gold medal at the Mixed 4 × 50 metre freestyle relay 20pts event, with a personal time of 30.52 and a total team time of 2:18.03, a world record and paralympic record. She also won a bronze medal at the Women's 50 metre freestyle S8 event with 30.53.
