= Shraga =

Shraga (Talmudic Aramaic: שרגא) is a Jewish given name (meaning "candle" in Talmudic Aramaic) and may refer to:

- Samuel ben Uri Shraga Phoebus, Polish rabbi and Talmudist of Woydyslaw in the second half of the 17th century
- Shraga Bar (1948–2025), Israeli football defender, who played for the Israel national team between 1968 and 1972
- Shraga Feivish Hager the rebbe of the Kosov Hasidic dynasty, dayan ("rabbinic judge"), and noted orator
- Shraga Feivel Mendlowitz (1886–1948), early leader of American Orthodoxy and founder of key institutions such as Torah Vodaath
- Shraga Feivel Paretzky
- Shraga Feivel Zimmerman, the rabbi and av beis din of Kehillas Federation, London
- Shraga Gafni, better knnown under the pen name On Sarig
- Shraga Goren (1898–1972), Israeli politician
- Shraga Har-Gil
- Shraga Moshe Kalmanowitz
- Shraga Shoval
- Shraga Silverstein
- Shraga Simmons (born 1961), influential rabbi involved in kiruv (Jewish outreach)
- Shraga Topolansky
- Shraga Weil (1918–2009), Israeli painter
- Shraga Weinberg (born 1966), Israeli wheelchair tennis player
- Uri Shraga Orbach
- Yechezkel Shraga Halberstam, (1813–1898), the eldest son of the Divrei Chaim, Rabbi Chaim Halberstam of Sanz

== Fictional characters ==
- Shraga from Shraga Bishgada
