= Paul Schulte (basketball) =

American wheelchair basketball player

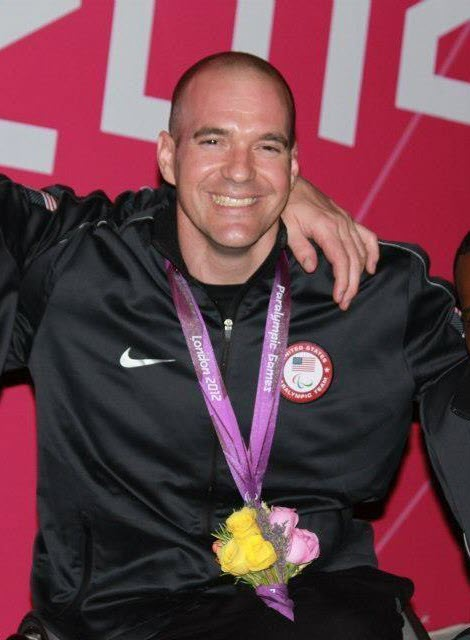
- Schulte in 2012

No. 14 – Wounded Warriors Abilities Ranch
- Position: Guard
- League: National Wheelchair Basketball Association

Personal information
- Born: March 5, 1979 (age 47) Ann Arbor, Michigan, U.S.
- Listed height: 6 ft (183 cm)

Career information
- High school: Manchester High School (Manchester, Michigan)
- College: University of Texas at Arlington
Medals
Men's wheelchair basketball
Representing United States
Paralympic Games
Gold medal – first place	2024 Paris	Team
Bronze medal – third place	2000 Sydney	Team
Bronze medal – third place	2012 London	Team
World Championship
Gold medal – first place	1998 Sydney	Team
Gold medal – first place	2002 Kitakyushu	Team
Silver medal – second place	2006 Amsterdam	Team
Bronze medal – third place	2010 Birmingham	Team
Silver medal – second place	2014 Incheon	Team
Parapan American Games
Gold medal – first place	1999 Mexico City	Team
Gold medal – first place	2007 Rio De Janeiro	Team
Gold medal – first place	2011 Guadalajara	Team
U23 World Championship
Silver medal – second place	1997 Toronto	Team
Bronze medal – third place	2001 Blumenau	Team

Paul Schulte (born 1979) is an American Paralympic wheelchair basketball player.

== Biography ==
Schulte grew up in Manchester, Michigan with a love of sports. In 1989, he was in a car accident at the age of 10 in which he was paralyzed from the waist down. At 14, he was introduced to the Paralympic sport of wheelchair basketball. Throughout high school, Paul played for the varsity division Grand Rapids Junior Pacers. The Pacers won two varsity division national championships during this time, with Schulte named as the National Most Valuable Player in his senior year.

In 1997, he accepted a full ride athletic scholarship to the University of Texas at Arlington. At 18 years old, during his freshman season at UT Arlington, Schulte was invited to try out for the U.S. men's Paralympic wheelchair basketball team. He won a position on the team and his basketball career began to skyrocket. Schulte went on to become a four-time Paralympian competing at the Games in Sydney, Beijing, London, and Paris. Additionally he won two world championship titles and in 2002 was awarded tournament MVP at the world championships in Kitakyushu, Japan.

During his senior year of college, Schulte's team won the Intercollegiate Championship where he received Most Valuable Player, Academic All-American, and Sportsmanship honors. UT-Arlington later retired his jersey number 20 in his honor.

He went on to become a five-time national champion with the National Wheelchair Basketball Association and was named MVP for the championship division three times. Along the way, Schulte has been nominated for both the Laureus and ESPY awards as Best Male Athlete of the Year with a Disability.

Schulte was invited to the White House on numerous occasions Presidents George W. Bush, Barack Obama and Joe Biden. Schulte retired from the national team from 2015 to 2023 and served as a broadcast commentator for NBC Sports during the Rio 2016 and Tokyo 2020 Paralympic Games.

Eight years after retirement, Schulte returned to competitive wheelchair basketball where he made his fourth Paralympic Team for the Paris 2024 Games where the team would go on to win their third consecutive gold.

Schulte graduated with a degree in Mechanical Engineering and currently serves as president for adaptive sport equipment manufacturer Top End Sports LLC (Pinellas Park, FL). Schulte and his high school sweetheart Meghan Greenwald were married in 2000 and their son Brady was born in 2010.

== Major achievements ==
=== U.S. Men's National Team, Paralympic Games ===
- 2000: Bronze Medal - Paralympic Games, Sydney Australia
- 2008: Paralympic Games, Beijing China
- 2012: Bronze Medal - Paralympic Games, London England
- 2024: Gold Medal - Paralympic Games, Paris France

=== U.S. Men's National Team, IWBF World Championships ===
- 1998: Gold Medal - IWBF World Championships, Sydney Australia
- 2002: Gold Medal - IWBF World Championships, Kitakyushu Japan
- 2002: Most Valuable Player - IWBF World Championships, Kitakyushu Japan
- 2006: Silver Medal - IWBF World Championships, Amsterdam Netherlands
- 2010: Bronze Medal - IWBF World Championships, Birmingham England
- 2014: Silver Medal - IWBF World Championships, Incheon South Korea

=== Men's Championship Division, National Wheelchair Basketball Association ===
- 4x National Champion, Dallas Wheelchair Mavericks, Championship Division I
- 1x National Champion, Orlando Wheelchair Magic, Championship Division I
- 3x Most Valuable Player, Championship Division I, National Wheelchair Basketball Tournament
- Hall of Fame, Class of 2022

=== Intercollegiate Division, National Wheelchair Basketball Association ===
- 1999: Most Valuable Player, Intercollegiate National Tournament
- 2002: National Champion, Intercollegiate National Tournament
- 2002: Most Valuable Player, Intercollegiate National Tournament
- 2002: Sportsmanship Award, Intercollegiate National Tournament
- 2002: Academic All American, Intercollegiate National Tournament
- Retired Jersey #20, University of Texas at Arlington

=== Junior Division, National Wheelchair Basketball Association ===
- 1995: National Champion, Junior National Wheelchair Basketball Tournament
- 1997: National Champion, Junior National Wheelchair Basketball Tournament
- 1997: Most Valuable Player, Junior National Wheelchair Basketball Tournament

=== Other ===
- 2002: ESPY Award Nominee, Best Male Athlete with a Disability, Los Angeles USA
- 2002: Laureus Award Nominee, Best Male Athlete with a Disability, Monaco
- 2016: Sports Analyst for NBC Sports, 2016 Paralympic Games, Rio De Janeiro
- 2021: Sports Analyst for NBC Sports, 2020 Paralympic Games, Tokyo
- Game Winning 3-Pointer: Wheelchair Basketball - USA v GB 2000 Sydney Bronze Medal
