= Jeremy Lade =

American wheelchair basketball player

Personal information
- Born: January 6, 1981 (age 45) Oconto, Wisconsin, U.S.
Medals
Men's wheelchair basketball
Representing United States
Paralympic Games
Bronze medal – third place	2012 London	Team
Parapan American Games
Gold medal – first place	2007 Rio de Janeiro	Team
Gold medal – first place	2011 Guadalajara	Team
World Championships
Gold medal – first place	2002 Kitakyushu	Team
Silver medal – second place	2006 Amsterdam	Team

Jeremy "Opie" Lade (born January 6, 1981) is an American Paralympic wheelchair basketball player and head coach from Oconto, Wisconsin. He was injured in a car accident at age 8, and attended his first wheelchair sports camp at the age of 13 at UW-Whitewater. He is a two-time Parapan American Games gold medalist in both 2007 and 2011. In 2002, he won a gold medal at IWBF World Championship and in 2006 won a silver one from the same place. Six years later, he was awarded a bronze medal for his participation at the 2012 Summer Paralympics and is currently employed as a head coach at the University of Wisconsin–Whitewater. From 2005 to 2008 he coached Milwaukee Wizards and led them to a Junior National Championship. In his spare time he likes to watch Green Bay Packers, Milwaukee Bucks, and Milwaukee Brewers with Michael Jordan being his favorite athlete. He will be inducted into the National Wheelchair Basketball Association (NWBA) Hall of Fame on April 12, 2025.
