= Megan Fisher =

Canadian-born American Paralympic athlete (born 1983)

Personal information
- Born: March 1, 1983 (age 43) Alberta, Canada
- Education: University of Montana; University of Washington
- Height: 5'4
- Weight: 133
Medal record
Representing United States
Women's para-cycling
Paralympic Games
Gold medal – first place	2012 London	Road time trial C4
Silver medal – second place	2012 London	Individual pursuit C4
Silver medal – second place	2016 Rio de Janeiro	Road time trial C4
Bronze medal – third place	2016 Rio de Janeiro	Individual pursuit C4
Women's paratriathlon
World Championships
Gold medal – first place	2009 Gold Coast	TRI 5
Gold medal – first place	2013 London	TRI 5

Megan Fisher (born March 1, 1983) is a Canadian-American Paralympic athlete. She has won one gold, two silver, and one bronze medal for Team USA at the Paralympic Games.

== Early life and education ==
Fisher grew up as an only child near Calgary, Alberta. After her parents separated, she moved to Hinsdale, Illinois, with her mother and divided her time with her father.

Fisher was a walk-on at the University of Montana's NCAA Division 1 tennis team, which she played during her freshman year. While driving with her friend back to school for their sophomore year on June 30, 2002, they were both injured in a car accident. After being pulled out of the car by a witness, Fisher's left leg was amputated; her friend died due to her injuries. Less than a year after the accident, Fisher returned to the University of Montana and competed in a triathlon following a second leg surgery.

== Career ==
Fisher met Paralympic cyclist Sam Kavanaugh, who inspired her to begin competing in para-cycling and eventually the USA Paralympic team. In 2010, Fisher competed in the TRI-5 classification and won the International Triathlon Union Paratriathlon World Championship in Budapest, Hungary, and won the 2010 USA Paratriathlon National Championship in the TRI-5 division. She also became the first female lower-leg amputee to complete an XTERRA off-road triathlon.

Prior to leaving for the 2012 Summer Paralympics, Fisher began studying for her doctorate in physical therapy at the University of Washington. In London, she competed in Paralympic cycling, winning both a gold and silver medal. Her gold medal came in the C4 time trial and her silver in the track pursuit.

The next year, Fisher won gold in the C4 classification at the 2013 UCI Para-cycling Road World Championships. As a result of winning the 2013 ITU Paratriathlon World Championships, her third world championship title, Fisher was honored by the United States Olympic Committee as USOC Athlete of the Month. She was later named to Team USA's 2015 UCI Para-cycling Road World Championships roster.

In 2016, Fisher was selected to compete with Team USA at the 2016 Summer Paralympics, where she won a silver medal after losing to teammate Shawn Morelli in the C4 road timed trial. She also ended the games with a bronze medal in the 3000M individual pursuit.
