= Rick Pendleton =

Australian Paralympic swimmer

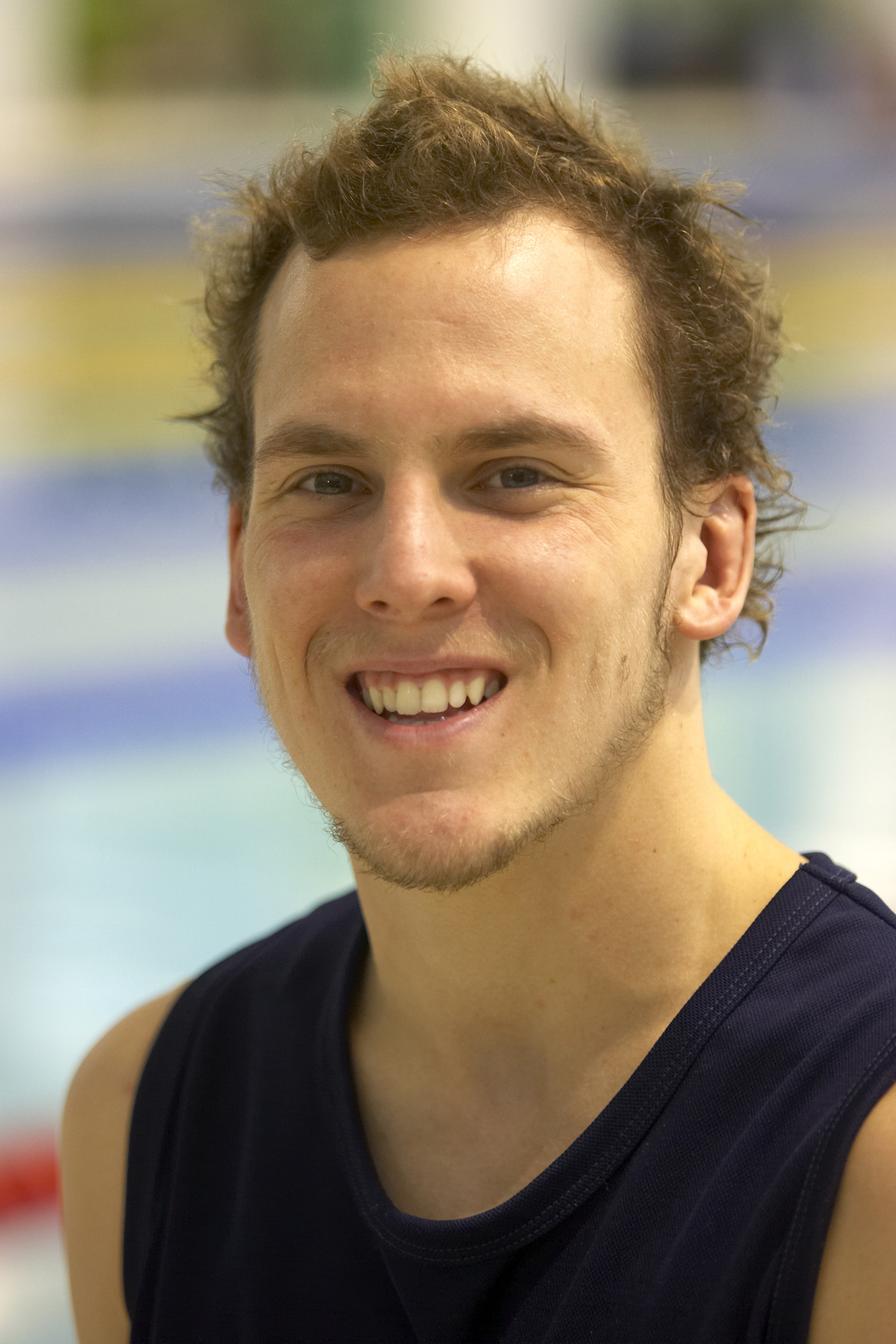
- Pendleton in 2008

Personal information
- Full name: Rick Pendleton
- Nationality: Australia
- Born: 12 January 1985 (age 41) Sydney, New South Wales, Australia

Sport
- Sport: Swimming
- Strokes: Breaststroke, medley
- Classifications: S10, SB9, SM10
- Club: University of Sunshine Coast Spartans
Medal record
Men's paralympic swimming
Representing Australia
Paralympic Games
Gold medal – first place	2004 Athens	4×100 m medley
Gold medal – first place	2008 Beijing	4×100 m medley
Gold medal – first place	2008 Beijing	200 m medley SM10
Bronze medal – third place	2012 London	200 m medley SM10
Bronze medal – third place	2012 London	4×100 m medley
World Championships (LC)
Silver medal – second place	2006 Durban	200 m medley SM10
Bronze medal – third place	2006 Durban	100 m breaststroke SB9
Bronze medal – third place	2015 Glasgow	100 m breaststroke SB9

Rick Pendleton, OAM (born 12 January 1985) is an Australian Paralympic swimmer from Sydney. He represented Australia at the 2016 Rio de Janeiro Paralympics, his fourth Games.

== Personal ==
He was born without his left hand. He turned to swimming after his rugby league career was ended by a knee ligament injury. He attended high school at Marcellin College Randwick. He is married to Jemma and they have a daughter Amara.

== Career ==
He has won five Paralympic medals. He won a gold medal at the 2004 Athens Games in the 4×100 m medley 34pts event, and two gold medals in the 2008 Beijing Games, at the 4×100 m medley 34pts and 200 m individual medley SM10 events. At the 2006 IPC Swimming World Championships in Durban, South Africa he won a silver medal in the 200m individual medley and bronze in the 100m breaststroke.

In 2011, at the age of 26, he competed in the Can-Am Swimming Open, where he earned a gold medal in the S10 200m butterfly event, a silver medal in the men's SM10 200 m individual medley, and a bronze in the 100m freestyle event.

Prior to the 2012 London Paralympics, he moved to the Sunshine Coast, Queensland to be coached by Jon Shaw. At the 2012 Summer Paralympics, he won a bronze medal in the 4×100 m medley relay 34pts and a bronze medal in the 200 m individual medley SM10.

Competing at the 2015 IPC Swimming World Championships in Glasgow, Scotland, he won a bronze medal in the 100 m breaststroke SB9. He finished fourth in the 4 × 100 m medley relay 34pts, fifth in the 200 m individual medley SM10, ninth in the 100 m butterfly S10, and eleventh in the 50 m freestyle S10.

He works as a swimming coach at Matthew Flinders Anglican College's Flinders Swim Club. In 2015, he was coached by Jan Cameron at the University of the Sunshine Coast.

At the 2016 Rio Paralympics Games, Pendleton competed in three events. He placed fifth in Men's 100m Breaststroke SB9 but didn't progress to the finals in Men's 100m Butterfly S10 and Men's 200m Individual Medley SM10.

== Recognition ==
In 2009, he received a Medal of the Order of Australia for his 2008 gold medals. He was an Australian Institute of Sport paralympic swimming scholarship holder.

His philosophy is "It only takes a moment to lose, it takes a lifetime to forget. Even coal under pressure becomes a diamond."
