= Kelley Becherer =

American Paralympic swimmer

Personal information
- Nationality: American
- Born: July 3, 1990 (age 35) Milwaukee, Wisconsin, U.S.
- Home town: Sheboygan, Wisconsin, U.S.
- Height: 5 ft 8 in (173 cm)

Sport
- Sport: Swimming
- Strokes: Freestyle, Breaststroke
Medal record
Women's swimming
Representing United States
Paralympic Games
Gold medal – first place	2008 Beijing	50 m freestyle S13
Gold medal – first place	2012 London	50 m freestyle S13
Gold medal – first place	2012 London	100 m freestyle S13
Bronze medal – third place	2008 Beijing	100 m freestyle S13
Bronze medal – third place	2008 Beijing	400 m freestyle S13
Bronze medal – third place	2012 London	200 m individual medley SM13
Bronze medal – third place	2012 London	100 m breaststroke SB13
IPC World Championships
Gold medal – first place	2010 Eindhoven	50m freestyle S13
Gold medal – first place	2010 Eindhoven	100m freestyle S13
Gold medal – first place	2010 Eindhoven	100m backstroke S13
Gold medal – first place	2010 Eindhoven	200m medley SM13
Bronze medal – third place	2010 Eindhoven	400m freestyle S13
Bronze medal – third place	2010 Eindhoven	100m butterfly S13}

Kelley Becherer (born July 3, 1990) is an American Paralympic swimmer. At the 2008 Summer Paralympics she won a gold medal and two bronze medals. She also competed at the 2004 Summer Paralympics and won two gold medals for the United States at the 2012 Summer Paralympics.

== Early life and education ==
Becherer was born with bilateral coloboma and microphthalmia and grew up in Sheboygan, Wisconsin. She began swimming at age six or seven.

She attended Northeastern University from 2009 to 2015 in their physical therapy program. While at Northeastern, Becherer competed as a Division 1 swimmer.

== Career ==
Becherer made her Paralympic debut at age 14 at the 2004 Summer Paralympics. She competed at the 2008 Summer Paralympics and won a gold medal in the 50m freestyle and bronze medals in the 100m freestyle and one in the 400m freestyle.

At the 2012 Paralympic Nationals, Becherer won the 100m and 50m freestyle and 50m backstroke and set a world record in the 50m backstroke. At the 2012 Summer Paralympics, she won gold in women’s S13 50 freestyle, setting an American Paralympic record with a time of 27.46. She also won gold in the 100m freestyle S13, and bronze in the 200m individual medley SM13 and 100m breaststroke SB13.

Becherer announced her retirement from competitive swimming in 2013, citing a desire to focus on school. She was inducted into the Wisconsin Swimming Hall of Fame in 2018. She went to the 2024 Summer Paralympics as an orthopedic physical therapist for Team USA and practices as a physiotherapist at UC San Diego Health’s outpatient sports clinic.

== Personal life ==
After graduating from Northeastern, Becherer moved to San Diego.
