= Achmat Hassiem =

South African Paralympic swimmer

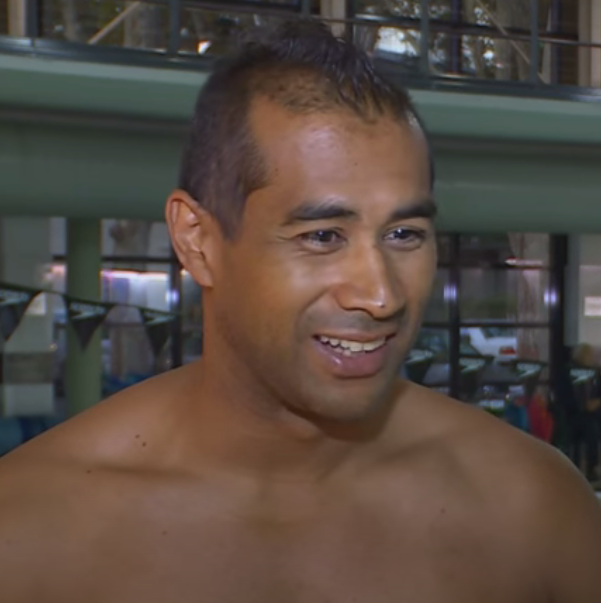

Personal information
- Nickname: Sharkboy
- Born: 6 May 1982 (age 44) Cape Town, South Africa

Sport
- Country: South Africa
- Sport: Paralympic swimming
- Disability class: S10
Medal record
Paralympic swimming
Representing South Africa
Paralympic Games
| Bronze medal – third place | 2012 London | 100m butterfly S10 |

Achmat Hassiem (born 6 May 1982) is a South African swimmer who was injured in an attack by a great white shark. He competed at the 2008 Summer Paralympics and he competed at the 2012 Summer Paralympics in London.

== Personal life ==
Hassiem was born on 6 May 1982 in Cape Town, Western Cape, South Africa. He attended Bergvliet High School in Bergvliet, a suburb of Cape Town.

In 2006, his right leg was severed by a four-and-a-half metre long great white shark whilst he was training for lifesaving exams at Muizenberg beach with his brother Tariq; the lower portion of his leg was subsequently amputated. Because of the manner in which he sustained his disability Hassiem is nicknamed "Sharkboy".

He is 1.94 metres (6 ft 4 in) tall and weighs 88 kilograms (194 lb).

== Swimming ==
Hassiem began swimming at the Sports Science Institute of South Africa following his accident. For competition he is categorised in the S10 classification, the classification for swimmers with the most physical ability. He is coached by Brian Button.

He first competed internationally for South Africa at the 2008 Summer Paralympics held in Beijing, People's Republic of China. He swam in the men's 100 metre backstroke S10 event finishing sixth in his heat in a time of one minute 1.61 seconds and failing to make the final.

He was selected to represent South Africa at the 2012 Summer Paralympics held in London, where he competed in the 100 metres butterfly and the 100 and 400 metres freestyle events. Swimming events at the Games were held from 30 August to 8 September at the London Aquatics Centre in the Olympic Park. On 1 September 2012, Hassiem won a bronze medal in the 100 m butterfly, setting a new African record of 57.76 seconds in the final.
