= Ian Jaryd Silverman =

American Paralympic swimmer

Personal information
- Full name: Ian Jaryd Silverman
- Nickname: Crazy Legs
- Nationality: United States
- Born: November 6, 1995 (age 30) Baltimore, Maryland

Sport
- Sport: Swimming
Medal record
Swimming
Paralympic Games
Gold medal – first place	2012 London	400m freestyle S10
IPC Swimming World Championships
Gold medal – first place	2013 Montreal	400m freestyle S10
Silver medal – second place	2013 Montreal	100m freestyle S10
Bronze medal – third place	2013 Montreal	50m freestyle S10
Bronze medal – third place	2013 Montreal	200m Individual Medley SM10

Ian Jaryd Silverman (born 1995) is an American swimmer from Baltimore, Maryland. He has mild cerebral palsy and won a gold medal in the S10 400 m freestyle at the 2012 Summer Paralympics in London. At the Pan Pacific Para-Swimming Championships in 2014, Silverman broke the S10 world record in the event, with a time of 4:03.57 As of August 2015, Silverman also holds para-swimming world record in the 400 m Individual Medley.

Silverman now swims at NCAA Division I college University of Southern California.

Silverman did not compete at the 2015 IPC Swimming World Championships, after a classification review deemed him not impaired enough to compete in his preferred events.
