= Swimming at the 2016 Summer Paralympics – Men's 100 metre freestyle S10 =

Men's 100 metre freestyle S10 at the XV Paralympic Games
- Venue: Olympic Aquatics Stadium
- Dates: 13 September 2016
- Competitors: 20 from 12 nations

Medalists
1st place, gold medalist(s)		Maksym Krypak	Ukraine
2nd place, silver medalist(s)		Andre Brasil	Brazil
3rd place, bronze medalist(s)		Phelipe Rodrigues	Brazil

The Men's 100 metre freestyle S10 event at the 2016 Paralympic Games took place on 13 September 2016, at the Olympic Aquatics Stadium. Three heats were held. The swimmers with the eight fastest times advanced to the final.

== Heats ==
=== Heat 1 ===
10:27 13 September 2016:

Rank	Lane	Name	Nationality	Time	Notes
1	5	Maksym Krypak	Ukraine	51.52	Q
2	4	Rowan Crothers	Australia	52.98	Q
3	3	David Levecq	Spain	55.25	
4	6	Alec Elliot	Canada	55.28	
5	2	Achmat Hassiem	South Africa	58.25	
6	7	Ludvig Nyren	Sweden	58.55	

=== Heat 2 ===
10:30 13 September 2016:

Rank	Lane	Name	Nationality	Time	Notes
1	5	Denys Dubrov	Ukraine	51.76	Q
2	4	Phelipe Rodrigues	Brazil	51.96	Q
3	3	Olivier van de Voort	Netherlands	54.77	Q
3	6	Dmytro Vanzenko	Ukraine	54.77	Q
5	2	Bas Takken	Netherlands	55.88	
6	7	Riccardo Menciotti	Italy	56.77	
7	1	Gonzalo Dutra	Uruguay	58.15	

=== Heat 3 ===
10:33 13 September 2016:

Rank	Lane	Name	Nationality	Time	Notes
1	4	Andre Brasil	Brazil	54.53	Q
2	5	Nathan Stein	Canada	54.56	Q
3	3	Guy Harrison-Murray	Australia	54.78	
4	6	Isaac Bouckley	Canada	56.16	
5	2	Michael Anderson	Australia	57.45	
6	7	Tye Dutcher	United States	57.78	
7	1	Lasse Andersen	Denmark	58.78	

== Final ==
18:10 13 September 2016:

Rank	Lane	Name	Nationality	Time	Notes
1st place, gold medalist(s)	4	Maksym Krypak	Ukraine	51.08	
2nd place, silver medalist(s)	2	Andre Brasil	Brazil	51.37	
3rd place, bronze medalist(s)	3	Phelipe Rodrigues	Brazil	51.48	
4	5	Denys Dubrov	Ukraine	51.54	
5	6	Rowan Crothers	Australia	52.17	
6	8	Dmytro Vanzenko	Ukraine	54.03	
7	7	Nathan Stein	Canada	54.43	
8	1	Olivier van de Voort	Netherlands	55.04	
