= Swimming at the 2016 Summer Paralympics – Men's 400 metre freestyle S10 =

Men's 400 metre freestyle S10 at the XV Paralympic Games
- Venue: Olympic Aquatics Stadium
- Dates: 15 September 2016
- Competitors: 15 from 9 nations

Medalists
1st place, gold medalist(s)		Maksym Krypak	Ukraine
2nd place, silver medalist(s)		Denys Dubrov	Ukraine
3rd place, bronze medalist(s)		Benoit Huot	Canada

The Men's 400 metre freestyle S10 event at the 2016 Paralympic Games took place on 15 September 2016, at the Olympic Aquatics Stadium. Two heats were held. The swimmers with the eight fastest times advanced to the final.

== Heats ==
=== Heat 1 ===
10:04 15 September 2016:

Rank	Lane	Name	Nationality	Time	Notes
1	4	Denys Dubrov	Ukraine	4:10.30	Q
2	5	Benoit Huot	Canada	4:10.58	Q
3	6	Guy Harrison-Murray	Australia	4:11.54	Q
4	3	Dmytro Vanzenko	Ukraine	4:13.33	Q
5	2	Isaac Bouckley	Canada	4:20.21	
6	1	Dalton Herendeen	United States	4:23.43	
7	7	Sven Decaesstecker	Belgium	4:25.14	

=== Heat 2 ===
10:11 15 September 2016:

Rank	Lane	Name	Nationality	Time	Notes
1	4	Maksym Krypak	Ukraine	4:05.72	Q
2	3	Bas Takken	Netherlands	4:08.60	Q
3	6	Andre Brasil	Brazil	4:13.34	Q
4	5	Rowan Crothers	Australia	4:13.72	Q
5	2	Olivier van de Voort	Netherlands	4:17.22	
6	7	Alec Elliot	Canada	4:22.51	
7	1	Ludvig Nyren	Sweden	4:24.90	
8	8	Riccardo Menciotti	Italy	4:30.27	

== Final ==
17:57 15 September 2016:

Rank	Lane	Name	Nationality	Time	Notes
1st place, gold medalist(s)	4	Maksym Krypak	Ukraine	3:57.71	WR
2nd place, silver medalist(s)	3	Denys Dubrov	Ukraine	4:00.11	
3rd place, bronze medalist(s)	6	Benoit Huot	Canada	4:04.63	
4	5	Bas Takken	Netherlands	4:05.46	
5	7	Dmytro Vanzenko	Ukraine	4:10.19	
6	8	Rowan Crothers	Australia	4:10.83	
7	1	Andre Brasil	Brazil	4:11.12	
8	2	Guy Harrison-Murray	Australia	4:11.18	
