= Swimming at the 2016 Summer Paralympics – Women's 200 metre individual medley SM7 =

Women's 200 metre individual medley SM7 at the XV Paralympic Games
- Venue: Olympic Aquatics Stadium
- Dates: 13 September 2016
- Competitors: 12 from 9 nations

Medalists
1st place, gold medalist(s)		Nikita Howarth	New Zealand
2nd place, silver medalist(s)		Tess Routliffe	Canada
3rd place, bronze medalist(s)		Cortney Jordan	United States

The women's 200 metre individual medley SM7 event at the 2016 Paralympic Games took place on 13 September 2016, at the Olympic Aquatics Stadium. Two heats were held. The swimmers with the eight fastest times advanced to the final.

== Heats ==
=== Heat 1 ===
10:15 13 September 2016:

Rank	Lane	Name	Nationality	Time	Notes
1	4	Tess Routliffe	Canada	3:04.87	Q
2	3	Sarah Mehain	Canada	3:14.82	Q
3	6	Arianna Talamona	Italy	3:18.06	Q
4	7	Judit Rolo Marichal	Spain	3:41.89	Q
5	2	Nydia Langill	Canada	3:44.41	
	5	Liting Ke	China		DSQ

=== Heat 2 ===
10:21 13 September 2016:

Rank	Lane	Name	Nationality	Time	Notes
1	4	Nikita Howarth	New Zealand	2:58.82	Q
2	5	Cortney Jordan	United States	3:08.84	Q
3	3	Ying Zhang	China	3:13.95	Q
4	6	Veronica Almeida	Brazil	3:22.27	Q
5	7	Gitta Raczko	Hungary	3:43.63	
	2	Meri-Maari Makinen	Finland		DSQ

== Final ==
18:01 13 September 2016:

Rank	Lane	Name	Nationality	Time	Notes
1st place, gold medalist(s)	4	Nikita Howarth	New Zealand	2:57.29	
2nd place, silver medalist(s)	5	Tess Routliffe	Canada	3:02.05	
3rd place, bronze medalist(s)	3	Cortney Jordan	United States	3:04.17	
4	6	Ying Zhang	China	3:09.28	
5	2	Sarah Mehain	Canada	3:11.16	
6	7	Arianna Talamona	Italy	3:16.97	
7	8	Judit Rolo Marichal	Spain	3:39.68	
	1	Veronica Almeida	Brazil		DSQ
