= Swimming at the 2016 Summer Paralympics – Women's 50 metre butterfly S7 =

Women's 50 metre butterfly S7 at the XV Paralympic Games
- Venue: Olympic Aquatics Stadium
- Dates: 12 September 2016
- Competitors: 10 from 8 nations

Medalists
1st place, gold medalist(s)		Susannah Rodgers	Great Britain
2nd place, silver medalist(s)		Cortney Jordan	United States
3rd place, bronze medalist(s)		Nikita Howarth	New Zealand

The women's 50 metre butterfly S7 event at the 2016 Paralympic Games took place on 12 September 2016, at the Olympic Aquatics Stadium. Two heats were held. The swimmers with the eight fastest times advanced to the final.

== Heats ==
=== Heat 1 ===
11:51 12 September 2016:

Rank	Lane	Name	Nationality	Time	Notes
1	4	Cortney Jordan	United States	36.51	Q
2	5	Sarah Mehain	Canada	36.91	Q
3	3	Judit Rolo Marichal	Spain	37.96	Q
4	6	Tess Routliffe	Canada	39.26	Q
5	2	Meri-Maari Makinen	Finland	44.52	

=== Heat 2 ===
11:51 12 September 2016:

Rank	Lane	Name	Nationality	Time	Notes
1	4	Nikita Howarth	New Zealand	35.40	Q
2	5	Susannah Rodgers	Great Britain	36.02	Q
3	3	McKenzie Coan	United States	37.54	Q
4	6	Veronica Almeida	Brazil	38.95	Q
5	2	Denise Grahl	Germany	40.62	

== Final ==
20:08 12 September 2016:

Rank	Lane	Name	Nationality	Time	Notes
1st place, gold medalist(s)	5	Susannah Rodgers	Great Britain	35.07	
2nd place, silver medalist(s)	3	Cortney Jordan	United States	35.46	
3rd place, bronze medalist(s)	4	Nikita Howarth	New Zealand	35.97	
4	6	Sarah Mehain	Canada	36.46	
5	7	Judit Rolo Marichal	Spain	37.78	
6	2	McKenzie Coan	United States	37.87	
7	8	Tess Routliffe	Canada	39.17	
8	1	Veronica Almeida	Brazil	39.51	
