= Canada at the 2016 Summer Paralympics =

- Flag of Canada
- IPC code: CAN
- NPC: Canadian Paralympic Committee
- Website: www.paralympic.ca

in Rio de Janeiro
- Competitors: 162 in 19 sports
- Flag bearers: David Eng (opening); Aurélie Rivard (closing)
- Medals Ranked 14th: Gold 8 Silver 10 Bronze 11 Total 29

Summer Paralympics appearances (overview)
- 1968; 1972; 1976; 1980; 1984; 1988; 1992; 1996; 2000; 2004; 2008; 2012; 2016; 2020; 2024

Canada competed at the 2016 Summer Paralympics in Rio de Janeiro, Brazil, from 7 to 18 September 2016.

On August 29, 2016, a team of 162 athletes in 19 sports was announced.

== Disability classifications ==
Every participant at the Paralympics has their disability grouped into one of five disability categories; amputation, the condition may be congenital or sustained through injury or illness; cerebral palsy; wheelchair athletes, there is often overlap between this and other categories; visual impairment, including blindness; Les autres, any physical disability that does not fall strictly under one of the other categories, for example dwarfism or multiple sclerosis. Each Paralympic sport then has its own classifications, dependent upon the specific physical demands of competition. Events are given a code, made of numbers and letters, describing the type of event and classification of the athletes competing. Some sports, such as athletics, divide athletes by both the category and severity of their disabilities, other sports, for example swimming, group competitors from different categories together, the only separation being based on the severity of the disability.

== Medallists ==
The following Canadian competitors won medals at the Games.

Medal	Name	Sport	Event	Date
Gold	Aurélie Rivard	Swimming	Women's 50 m freestyle S10	9 September
Gold	Brent Lakatos	Athletics	Men's 100m T53	9 September
Gold	Michelle Stilwell	Athletics	Women's 400m T52	10 September
Gold	Aurélie Rivard	Swimming	Women's 100 m freestyle S10	13 September
Gold	Tristen Chernove	Cycling	Men's time trial C2	14 September
Gold	Katarina Roxon	Swimming	100 m breaststroke SB8	14 September
Gold	Aurélie Rivard	Swimming	400 m freestyle S10	15 September
Gold	Michelle Stilwell	Athletics	Women's 100m T52	17 September
Silver	Ross Wilson	Cycling	Men's individual pursuit C1	9 September
Silver	Tristen Chernove	Cycling	Men's individual pursuit C2	9 September
Silver	Alister McQueen	Athletics	Men's Javelin Throw F44	9 September
Silver	Stefan Daniel	Paratriathlon	Men's PT4	10 September
Silver	Brent Lakatos	Athletics	Men's 400m T53	11 September
Silver	Liam Stanley	Athletics	1500 m T37	11 September
Silver	Aurélie Rivard	Swimming	200 m individual medley SM10	11 September
Silver	Tess Routliffe	Swimming	200 m individual medley SM7	13 September
Silver	Ross Wilson	Cycling	Men's time trial C1	14 September
Silver	John McRoberts; Jackie Gay	Sailing	SKUD 18 – 2 person keelboat	17 September
Bronze	Tristen Chernove	Cycling	Men's 1000m time trial C1-3	10 September
Bronze	Victoria Nolan; Meghan Montgomery; Andrew Todd; Curtis Halladay; Kristen Kit	Rowing	Mixed coxed four	11 September
Bronze	Charles Moreau	Cycling	Men's time trial H3	14 September
Bronze	Michael Sametz	Cycling	Men's time trial C3	14 September
Bronze	Shelley Gautier	Cycling	Women's time trial T1-2	14 September
Bronze	Charles Moreau	Cycling	Men's road race H3	15 September
Bronze	Benoit Huot	Swimming	400 m freestyle S10	15 September
Bronze	Brent Lakatos	Athletics	Men's 800m T53	15 September
Bronze	Paul Tingley; Scott Lutes; Logan Campbell	Sailing	Sonar – 3 person keelboat	17 September
Bronze	Nicolas-Guy Turbide	Swimming	100 m backstroke S13	17 September
Bronze	Alexandre Dupont; Brent Lakatos; Tristan Smyth; Curtis Thom	Athletics	Men's 4 x 400m relay	17 September

Medals by sport/discipline
Sport	1st place, gold medalist(s)	2nd place, silver medalist(s)	3rd place, bronze medalist(s)	Total
Swimming	4	2	2	8
Athletics	3	3	2	8
Cycling	1	3	5	9
Sailing	0	1	1	2
Paratriathlon	0	1	0	1
Rowing	0	0	1	1
Total	8	10	11	29

Medals by day
Day	1st place, gold medalist(s)	2nd place, silver medalist(s)	3rd place, bronze medalist(s)	Total
September 8	0	0	0	0
September 9	2	3	0	5
September 10	1	1	1	3
September 11	0	3	1	4
September 12	0	0	0	0
September 13	1	1	0	2
September 14	2	1	3	6
September 15	1	0	3	4
September 16	0	0	0	0
September 17	1	1	3	5
September 18	0	0	0	0
Total	8	10	11	29

Multiple medalists
Name	Sport	1st place, gold medalist(s)	2nd place, silver medalist(s)	3rd place, bronze medalist(s)	Total
Aurélie Rivard	Swimming	3	1	0	4
Michelle Stilwell	Athletics	2	0	0	2
Brent Lakatos	Athletics	1	1	2	4
Tristen Chernove	Cycling	1	1	1	3
Ross Wilson	Cycling	0	2	0	2
Charles Moreau	Cycling	0	0	2	2

== Archery ==
Athlete	Event	Ranking round		Round of 32	Round of 16	Quarterfinals	Semifinals	Final / BM	
Athlete	Event	Score	Seed	Opposition Score	Opposition Score	Opposition Score	Opposition Score	Opposition Score	Rank
Kevin Evans	Men's individual Compound open	656	22	Cancelli (ITA); L 128-146	did not advance				
Karen van Nest	Women's individual Compound open	654	4	Bye	Alim (SIN); L 135-140	did not advance			
Kevin Evans; Karen van Nest	Mixed Team Compound open	1310	7	—N/a	Spain (ESP); W 144-137	China (CHN); L 143-155	did not advance		

== Athletics ==
Men
Track

Athlete	Events	Heat		Semifinal		Final	
Athlete	Events	Time	Rank	Time	Rank	Time	Rank
Joshua Cassidy	800 m T54	1:39.86	8	—N/a		did not advance	
Joshua Cassidy	1500 m T54	3:05.97	6	—N/a		did not advance	
Joshua Cassidy	5000 m T54	10:27.94	7 q	—N/a		11:09.42	10
Mitchell Chase	1500 m T38	—N/a				4:28.44	4
Shayne Dobson	1500 m T37	—N/a				4:21.06	5
Alexandre Dupont	400 m T54	49.28	6	—N/a		did not advance	
Alexandre Dupont	800 m T54	1:40.37	6	—N/a		did not advance	
Alexandre Dupont	1500 m T54	3:10.28	7	—N/a		did not advance	
Jason Dunkerley (Josh Karanja:guide)	1500 m T11	4:14.99	2 q	—N/a		4:07.98	5
Brent Lakatos	100 m T53	14.43 PR	1 Q	—N/a		14.44	1st place, gold medalist(s)
Brent Lakatos	400 m T53	50.47	1 Q	—N/a		48.53	2nd place, silver medalist(s)
Brent Lakatos	800 m T53	1:43.37	1 Q	—N/a		1:41.09	3rd place, bronze medalist(s)
Jean-Philippe Miranda	100 m T53	16.02	6	—N/a		did not advance	
Jean-Philippe Miranda	400 m T53	52.24	4	—N/a		did not advance	
Jean-Philippe Miranda	800 m T53	1:44.98	8	—N/a		did not advance	
Guillaume Ouellet	1500 m T13	—N/a				3:57.98	9
Guillaume Ouellet	5000 m T13	—N/a				14:54.07	4
Austin Smeenk	100 m T34	16.03	2 Q	—N/a		16.21	6
Austin Smeenk	800 m T34	1:47.61	4 q	—N/a		DQ	
Tristan Smyth	1500 m T54	3:11.35	8	—N/a		did not advance	
Liam Stanley	1500 m T37	—N/a				4:16.72	2nd place, silver medalist(s)
Curtis Thom	400 m T54	47.93	5	—N/a		did not advance	
Alexandre Dupont; Brent Lakatos; Tristan Smyth; Curtis Thom	4 × 400 m relay T53-54	3:11.41	4 q	—N/a		3:08.00	3rd place, bronze medalist(s)

Field

Athlete	Events	Result	Rank
Alister McQueen	Javelin F44	55.56	2nd place, silver medalist(s)
Kevin Strybosch	Discus F37	41.81	9

Women
Track

Athlete	Events	Heat		Semifinal		Final	
Athlete	Events	Time	Rank	Time	Rank	Time	Rank
Ilana Dupont	100 m T53	17.81	4 q	—N/a		17.82	8
Ilana Dupont	400 m T53	1:00.03	5	—N/a		did not advance	
Ilana Dupont	800 m T53	2:01.17	6	—N/a		did not advance	
Marissa Papaconstantinou	100 m T44	13.65	3	—N/a		did not advance	
Marissa Papaconstantinou	200 m T44	DQ		—N/a		did not advance	
Diane Roy	400 m T54	57.29	5	—N/a		did not advance	
Diane Roy	800 m T54	1:53.51	3 Q	—N/a		1:51.51	7
Diane Roy	1500 m T54	3:32.13	3 Q	—N/a		3:24.57	6
Diane Roy	5000 m T54	11:58.04	5 q	—N/a		11:58.78	7
Michelle Stilwell	100 m T52	—N/a				19.42 PR	1st place, gold medalist(s)
Michelle Stilwell	400 m T52	—N/a				1:05.43 PR	1st place, gold medalist(s)

Field

Athlete	Events	Result	Rank
Jennifer Brown	Discus F38	27.95	7
Renee Foessel	Discus F38	30.70	4
Pamela LeJean	Shot Put F53	4.16	4
Ness Murby	Discus F11	28.02	6

== Boccia ==
Canada qualified for the 2016 Summer Paralympics in this sport at the Montreal hosted 2015 BisFed Americas Pair and Team championship in the Pairs BC4 event. They claimed gold ahead of silver medalist Brazil and bronze medalists Colombia.

Individual

Athlete	Event	Pool matches				Quarterfinals	Semifinals	Final / BM	
Athlete	Event	Opposition Score	Opposition Score	Opposition Score	Rank	Opposition Score	Opposition Score	Opposition Score	Rank
Eric Bussiere	Mixed individual BC3	Verwimp (BEL); L 2–7	Kim (KOR); L 1-4	—N/a	3	did not advance			
Bruno Garneau	Mixed individual BC3	Macedo (POR); L 2–7	Choi (KOR); L 1-8	—N/a	3	did not advance			
Marco Dispaltro	Mixed individual BC4	Levine (CAN); W 5–2	Lin (CHN); L 1-6	Zheng (CHN); L 0-9	4	did not advance			
Alison Levine	Mixed individual BC4	Dispaltro (CAN); L 2–5	Zheng (CHN); L 2–5	Lin (CHN); W 6-1	2 Q	Larpyen (THA); L 2–3	did not advance		

Pairs

Athlete	Event	Pool matches				Semifinals	Final / BM	
Athlete	Event	Opposition Score	Opposition Score	Opposition Score	Rank	Opposition Score	Opposition Score	Rank
from Eric Bussiere; Bruno Garneau; Marylou Martineau	Mixed pair B3	South Korea (KOR); L 1–10	Brazil (BRA); L 2–11	Belgium (BEL); L 7-0	4	did not advance		
from Iulian Ciobanu; Marco Dispaltro; Alison Levine	Mixed pair B4	Brazil (BRA); L 3–4	China (CHN); W 3–2	Thailand (THA); L 3–7	3	did not advance		

== Cycling ==
=== Road ===
Athlete	Event	Time	Rank
Daniel Chalifour (Jean-Michel Lachance - pilot)	Men's road race B	DNF	
Daniel Chalifour (Jean-Michel Lachance - pilot)	Men's time trial B	37:09.53	15
Ross Wilson	Men's road race C1-2-3	DNF	
Ross Wilson	Men's time trial C1	28:47.34	2nd place, silver medalist(s)
Tristen Chernove	Men's road race C1-2-3	1:54:49	15
Tristen Chernove	Men's time trial C2	27:43.16	1st place, gold medalist(s)
Michael Sametz	Men's road race C1-2-3	DNF	
Michael Sametz	Men's time trial C3	39:41.28	3rd place, bronze medalist(s)
Charles Moreau	Men's road race H3	1:33:17	3rd place, bronze medalist(s)
Charles Moreau	Men's time trial H3	29:26.91	3rd place, bronze medalist(s)
Shawna Ryan (Joanie Caron – pilot)	Women's road race B	2:11:40	12
Shawna Ryan (Joanie Caron – pilot)	Women's time trial B	43:04.33	13
Robbi Weldon (Audrey Lemieux – pilot)	Women's road race B	2:01:16	5
Robbi Weldon (Audrey Lemieux – pilot)	Women's time trial B	41:38.98	7
Marie-Claude Molnar	Women's road race C4-5	2:37:49	16
Marie-Claude Molnar	Women's time trial C4	30:54.75	5
Nicole Clermont	Women's road race C4-5	DNF	
Nicole Clermont	Women's time trial C5	30:32.52	8
Marie-Ève Croteau	Women's road race T1-2	1:08:42	4
Marie-Ève Croteau	Women's time trial T1-2	29:43.47	6
Shelley Gautier	Women's road race T1-2	1:11:37	6
Shelley Gautier	Women's time trial T1-2	26:50.87	3rd place, bronze medalist(s)

=== Track ===
Athlete	Event	Qualification		Final	
Athlete	Event	Time	Rank	Opposition Time	Rank
Daniel Chalifour (Jean-Michel Lachance - pilot)	Men's individual pursuit B	4:24.129	9	did not advance	
Ross Wilson	Men's individual pursuit C1	3:53.666	2 Q	Li (CHN); L Overlapped	2nd place, silver medalist(s)
Ross Wilson	Men's 1000m time trial C1-3	—N/a		1:14.549	15
Tristen Chernove	Men's individual pursuit C2	3:44.731	2 Q	Liang (CHN); L 3:47.412	2nd place, silver medalist(s)
Tristen Chernove	Men's 1000m time trial C1-3	—N/a		1:09.583 PR	3rd place, bronze medalist(s)
Michael Sametz	Men's individual pursuit C3	3:38.459	3 Q	Clifford (IRL); L 3:41.590	4
Michael Sametz	Men's 1000m time trial C1-3	—N/a		1:15.171	17
Marie-Claude Molnar	Women's individual pursuit C4	4:08.452	5	did not advance	
Nicole Clermont	Women's individual pursuit C5	4:08.557	9	did not advance	

== Equestrian ==
The country qualified to participate in the team event at the Rio Games.

Individual

Athlete	Horse	Event	Total	
Athlete	Horse	Event	Score	Rank
Lauren Barwick	Onyx	Individual championship test grade II	68.686	7
Lauren Barwick	Onyx	Individual freestyle test grade II	70.450	6
Roberta Sheffield	Double Agent	Individual championship test grade III	67.146	14
Robyn Andrews	Fancianna	Individual championship test grade Ia	64.261	22
Ashley Gowanlock	Di Scansano	Individual championship test grade Ib	65.103	9

Team

Athlete	Horse	Event	Individual score			Total	
Athlete	Horse	Event	TT	CT	Total	Score	Rank
Lauren Barwick	See above	Team	69.265	68.686	137.951	404.926	13
Roberta Sheffield	See above	Team	67.526	67.146	134.672	404.926	13
Robyn Andrews	See above	Team	62.696	64.261	126.957	404.926	13
Ashley Gowanlock	See above	Team	67.200	65.103	132.303	404.926	13

== Goalball ==
=== Men ===
The Canada men's national goalball team qualified for the Rio Games after finishing third at the 2015 Parapan American Games. They earned the spot because the two teams ahead of them, Brazil and the United States, had already qualified. Canada's men enter the tournament ranked 16th in the world.

The following is the Canada roster in the men's goalball tournament of the 2016 Summer Paralympics.

No.	Player	Class	Date of birth (age)
1	Ahmad Zeivdavi	B1	September 3, 1985 (aged 31)
3	Brendan Gaulin	B3	July 13, 1989 (aged 27)
5	Bruno Hache	B2	July 13, 1977 (aged 39)
6	Blair Nesbitt	B3	November 24, 1992 (aged 23)
7	Doug Ripley	B3	November 15, 1973 (aged 42)
8	Simon Richard	B3	May 12, 1994 (aged 22)

Pos	Team	Pld	W	D	L	GF	GA	GD	Pts	Qualification
1	Brazil (H)	4	4	0	0	42	15	+27	12	Quarter-finals
2	Sweden	4	3	0	1	33	23	+10	9	Quarter-finals
3	Germany	4	1	0	3	24	26	−2	3	Quarter-finals
4	Canada	4	1	0	3	26	39	−13	3	Quarter-finals
5	Algeria	4	1	0	3	25	47	−22	3	

Source: Paralympic.org
(H) Hosts

9 September 2016; 13:15	Canada	3–11	Brazil	Future Arena, Rio de Janeiro; Referees: Patricia Fras (SLO), Nejc Jakic (SLO)
9 September 2016; 13:15	Hache 2 Ripley 1	Report	Marques 4 de Melo 3 Moreno 2 Sousa 1 Celente 1	Future Arena, Rio de Janeiro; Referees: Patricia Fras (SLO), Nejc Jakic (SLO)

10 September 2016; 17:30	Germany	5–7	Canada	Future Arena, Rio de Janeiro; Referees: Vilma Basinkaite (LTU), Raili Sipura (FIN)
10 September 2016; 17:30	Feistle 5	Report	Gaulin 6 Nesbitt 1	Future Arena, Rio de Janeiro; Referees: Vilma Basinkaite (LTU), Raili Sipura (FIN)

12 September 2016; 11:30	Algeria	17–13	Canada	Future Arena, Rio de Janeiro; Referees: Raili Sipura (FIN), Alexander Knecht (GER)
12 September 2016; 11:30	Mokrane 9 Godmane 6 Larbi 1 Boutaleb 1	Report	Nesbitt 6 Hache 3 Gaulin 3 Larbi 1 (o.g)	Future Arena, Rio de Janeiro; Referees: Raili Sipura (FIN), Alexander Knecht (GER)

13 September 2016; 14:15	Canada	3–6	Sweden	Future Arena, Rio de Janeiro; Referees: Alexander Knecht (GER), Vilma Basinkaite (LTU)
13 September 2016; 14:15	Nesbitt 2 Zeividavi 1	Report	Björkstrand 3 Seremeti 3	Future Arena, Rio de Janeiro; Referees: Alexander Knecht (GER), Vilma Basinkaite (LTU)

Quarterfinal

14 September 2016; 18:00	Lithuania	5–4	Canada	Future Arena, Rio de Janeiro; Referees: Bülent Kimyon (TUR), Alexander Knecht (GER)
14 September 2016; 18:00	Pazarauskas 3 Pavliukianec 2	Report	Ripley 2 Hache 1 Nesbitt 1	Future Arena, Rio de Janeiro; Referees: Bülent Kimyon (TUR), Alexander Knecht (GER)

=== Women ===
The Canada women's national goalball team qualified for the Rio Games after finishing third at the 2015 Parapan American Games. They earned the spot because the two teams ahead of them, Brazil and the United States, had already qualified. Canada's women enter the tournament ranked 6th in the world.

The following is the Canada roster in the women's goalball tournament of the 2016 Summer Paralympics.

No.	Player	Class	Date of birth (age)
3	Whitney Bogart	B3	April 21, 1986 (aged 30)
4	Ashlie Marie Andrews	B3	January 4, 1993 (aged 23)
6	Jillian Macsween	B3	June 2, 1992 (aged 24)
7	Amy Burk	B3	March 17, 1990 (aged 26)
8	Meghan Mahon	B2	January 15, 1996 (aged 20)
9	Nancy Morin	B2	August 28, 1975 (aged 41)

Pos	Team	Pld	W	D	L	GF	GA	GD	Pts	Qualification
1	Turkey	4	4	0	0	37	11	+26	12	Quarter-finals
2	China	4	3	0	1	21	14	+7	9	Quarter-finals
3	Canada	4	2	0	2	16	22	−6	6	Quarter-finals
4	Ukraine	4	0	1	3	9	17	−8	1	Quarter-finals
5	Australia	4	0	1	3	6	25	−19	1	

Source: Paralympic.org

9 September 2016; 10:15	Turkey	12–4	Canada	Future Arena, Rio de Janeiro; Referees: Raili Sipura (FIN), Alexander Knecht (GER)
9 September 2016; 10:15	Altunoluk 8 Özcan 2 Mercan 2	Report	Burk 4	Future Arena, Rio de Janeiro; Referees: Raili Sipura (FIN), Alexander Knecht (GER)

11 September 2016; 14:30	Canada	3–2	Ukraine	Future Arena, Rio de Janeiro; Referees: Raquel Aguado (ESP), Daniel Voltan (BRA)
11 September 2016; 14:30	Burk 2 Bogart 1	Report	Rud 2	Future Arena, Rio de Janeiro; Referees: Raquel Aguado (ESP), Daniel Voltan (BRA)

12 September 2016; 18:15	China	8–3	Canada	Future Arena, Rio de Janeiro; Referees: Vilma Basinkaite (LTU), Yoshinori Nii (JPN)
12 September 2016; 18:15	Zhang W. 7 Ju 1	Report	Andrews 2 Morin 1	Future Arena, Rio de Janeiro; Referees: Vilma Basinkaite (LTU), Yoshinori Nii (JPN)

13 September 2016; 15:30	Canada	6–0	Australia	Future Arena, Rio de Janeiro; Referees: Daniel Voltan (BRA), Raili Sipura (FIN)
13 September 2016; 15:30	Burk 6	Report		Future Arena, Rio de Janeiro; Referees: Daniel Voltan (BRA), Raili Sipura (FIN)

Quarterfinal

14 September 2016; 19:30	United States	2–0	Canada	Future Arena, Rio de Janeiro; Referees: Vilma Basinkaite (LTU), Daniel Voltan (BRA)
14 September 2016; 19:30	Armbruster 2	Report		Future Arena, Rio de Janeiro; Referees: Vilma Basinkaite (LTU), Daniel Voltan (BRA)

== Judo ==
Athlete	Event	Preliminaries	Quarterfinals	Semifinals	Repechage First round	Repechage Final	Final / BM	
Athlete	Event	Opposition Result	Opposition Result	Opposition Result	Opposition Result	Opposition Result	Opposition Result	Rank
Tony Walby	Men's –90 kg	Lencina (ARG); L 0-100s1	did not advance					9
Priscilla Gagné	Women's -52 kg	—N/a	Abdellaoui (ALG); L 0s1-0	did not advance	—N/a	Lohatska (UKR); W 100-0	Salaeva (UZB); L 0-1s1	5

== Paracanoeing ==
Canada earned a qualifying spot at the 2016 Summer Paralympics in this sport following their performance at the 2015 ICF Canoe Sprint & Paracanoe World Championships in Milan, Italy where the top six finishers in each Paralympic event earned a qualifying spot for their nation. Christine Gauthier earned the spot for Canada after finishing sixth in the women's KL2 event.

Athlete	Event	Heats		Semifinal		Final	
Athlete	Event	Time	Rank	Time	Rank	Time	Rank
Christine Gauthier	Women's KL2	59.077	3 SF	59.482	1 FA	58.109	4
Erica Scarff	Women's KL3	54.904	3 SF	55.525	3 FA	53.916	7

== Paratriathlon ==
Athlete	Event	Swim	Trans 1	Bike	Trans 2	Run	Total time	Rank
Stefan Daniel	Men's PT4	10:51	1:10	34:00	0:49	16:06	1:03:05	2nd place, silver medalist(s)
Chantal Givens	Women's PT4	15:24	1:30	39:34	0:56	21:49	1:19:13	8
Christine Robbins (Guide - Sasha Boulton)	Women's PT5	16:34	1:39	36:19	0:57	23:42	1:22:59	10

== Rowing ==
One pathway for qualifying for Rio involved having a boat have top eight finish at the 2015 FISA World Rowing Championships in a medal event. Canada qualified for the 2016 Games under this criterion in the LTA Mixed Coxed Four event with a third place finish in a time of 03:27.380.

Athlete(s)	Event	Heats		Repechage		Final	
Athlete(s)	Event	Time	Rank	Time	Rank	Time	Rank
Victoria Nolan; Meghan Montgomery; Andrew Todd; Curtis Halladay; Kristen Kit (cox)	Mixed coxed four	3:24.69	2 R	3:33.85	1 FA	3:19.90	3rd place, bronze medalist(s)

Qualification Legend: FA=Final A (medal); FB=Final B (non-medal); R=Repechage

== Sailing ==
Canada qualified a boat for all three sailing classes at the Games through their results at the 2014 Disabled Sailing World Championships held in Halifax, Nova Scotia, Canada. Places were earned in the solo 2.4mR event, the two-person SKUD 18-class and a crew also qualified for the three-person Sonar class.

Athlete	Event	Race											Total points	Net points	Rank
Athlete	Event	1	2	3	4	5	6	7	8	9	10	11	Total points	Net points	Rank
Bruce Millar	2.4 mR – 1 person keelboat	6	10	~~17~~	8	17	3	10	4	7	9	11	101	84	10
John McRoberts; Jackie Gay	SKUD 18 – 2 person keelboat	5	1	3	3	4	~~12~~	2	5	2	6	3	46	34	2nd place, silver medalist(s)
Paul Tingley; Scott Lutes; Logan Campbell	Sonar – 3 person keelboat	2	8	1	5	9	9	~~11~~	1	7	2	7	62	51	3rd place, bronze medalist(s)

== Shooting ==
Athlete	Event	Qualification		Final	
Athlete	Event	Score	Rank	Score	Rank
Doug Blessin	Mixed 10 metre air rifle standing SH2	621.0	25	did not advance	
Doug Blessin	Mixed 10 metre air rifle prone SH2	634.7	5 Q	124.9	6

== Sitting volleyball ==
=== Women ===
Canada women's national sitting volleyball team qualified for the 2016 Games at the 2015 Parapan American Games.

==== Squad ====
- Chantal Beauchesne (St. Isidore, Ont.)
- Angelena Dolezar (Edmonton)
- Danielle Ellis (Langley, B.C.)
- Leanne Muldrew (Winnipeg)
- Jennifer Oakes (Calgary)
- Shacarra Orr (Jaffray, B.C.)
- Heidi Peters (Neerlandia, Alta.)
- Tessa Popoff (Surrey, B.C.)
- Amber Skyrpan (Wandering River, Alta.)
- Felicia Voss-Shafiq (Burnaby, B.C.)
- Jolan Wong (Pembroke, Ont.)
- Katelyn Wright (Edmonton)

==== Group A ====
Pos	Team	Pld	W	L	Pts	SW	SL	SR	SPW	SPL	SPR	Qualification
1	Brazil (H)	3	3	0	6	9	0	MAX	225	140	1.607	Semi-finals
2	Ukraine	3	2	1	5	6	5	1.200	237	229	1.035	Semi-finals
3	Netherlands	3	1	2	4	5	7	0.714	250	265	0.943	Classification 5th / 6th
4	Canada	3	0	3	3	1	9	0.111	169	247	0.684	Classification 7th / 8th

Source: Paralympic.org
(H) Host

9 September 2016; 18:30	Brazil	3–0	Canada	Riocentro - Pavilion 6, Rio de Janeiro
9 September 2016; 18:30	(25–7, 25–12, 25–14); Report			Riocentro - Pavilion 6, Rio de Janeiro

11 September 2016; 14:00	Canada	1–3	Netherlands	Riocentro - Pavilion 6, Rio de Janeiro
11 September 2016; 14:00	(25–22, 17–25, 17–25, 22–25); Report			Riocentro - Pavilion 6, Rio de Janeiro

13 September 2016; 18:30	Ukraine	3–0	Canada	Riocentro - Pavilion 6, Rio de Janeiro
13 September 2016; 18:30	(25–20, 25–19, 25–16); Report			Riocentro - Pavilion 6, Rio de Janeiro

Classification 7th / 8th

15 September 2016; 13:30	Canada	3–0	Rwanda	Riocentro - Pavilion 6, Rio de Janeiro
15 September 2016; 13:30	(25–21, 25–15, 25–20); Report			Riocentro - Pavilion 6, Rio de Janeiro

== Swimming ==
The top two finishers in each Rio medal event at the 2015 IPC Swimming World Championships earned a qualifying spot for their country for Rio. Aurelie Rivard earned Canada a spot after winning gold in the Women's 50m Freestyle S10.

Men

Athlete	Events	Heats		Final	
Athlete	Events	Time	Rank	Time	Rank
Isaac Bouckley	50 m freestyle S10	25.80	13	did not advance	
Isaac Bouckley	100 m freestyle S10	56.16	13	did not advance	
Isaac Bouckley	400 m freestyle S10	4:20.21	10	did not advance	
Isaac Bouckley	100 m breaststroke SB9	1:12.39	9	did not advance	
Isaac Bouckley	200 m individual medley SM10	2:15.67	7 Q	2:17.33	8
Nathan Clement	50 m freestyle S6	34.47	18	did not advance	
Nathan Clement	50 m butterfly S6	34.04	8 Q	33.13	7
Jonathan Dieleman	50 m breaststroke SB3	50.08	5 Q	50.21	5
Alec Elliot	50 m freestyle S10	25.04	7 Q	24.84	8
Alec Elliot	100 m freestyle S10	55.28	11	did not advance	
Alec Elliot	400 m freestyle S10	4:22.51	11	did not advance	
Alec Elliot	100 m backstroke S10	1:01.36	7 Q	1:02.45	7
Alec Elliot	100 m breaststroke SB9	1:13.36	10	did not advance	
Alec Elliot	100 m butterfly S10	59.13	6 Q	58.35	4
Devin Gotell	50 m freestyle S13	27.24	19	did not advance	
Devin Gotell	400 m freestyle S13	4:25.72	11	did not advance	
Devin Gotell	100 m backstroke S13	1:06.56	8 Q	1:06.62	8
Devin Gotell	200 m individual medley SM13	2:28.27	16	did not advance	
Benoit Huot	400 m freestyle S10	4:10.58	4 Q	4:04.63	3rd place, bronze medalist(s)
Benoit Huot	100 m backstroke S10	1:01.03	5 Q	1:00.33	5
Benoit Huot	200 m individual medley SM10	2:13.98	=4 Q	2:11.85	4
Jean-Michel Lavallière	50 m freestyle S7	32.04	10	did not advance	
Jean-Michel Lavallière	100 m freestyle S7	1:10.27	12	did not advance	
Jean-Michel Lavallière	50 m butterfly S7	34.13	10	did not advance	
James Leroux	100 m breaststroke SB9	1:10.05	8 Q	1:10.03	7
Zack Mcallister	50 m freestyle S8	27.90	8 Q	27.73	8
Zack Mcallister	100 m freestyle S8	1:01.36	8 Q	1:01.37	7
Gordie Michie	200 m freestyle S14	2:06.46	14	did not advance	
Gordie Michie	100 m backstroke S14	1:05.21	7 Q	1:05.12	5
Gordie Michie	100 m breaststroke SB14	1:12.01	11	did not advance	
Gordie Michie	200 m individual medley SM14	2:19.85	8 Q	2:18.88	8
Tyler Mrak	100 m freestyle S13	1:00.01	22	did not advance	
Tyler Mrak	400 m freestyle S13	4:46.12	13	did not advance	
Tyler Mrak	100 m backstroke S13	1:11.88	11	did not advance	
Tyler Mrak	100 m breaststroke SB13	1:15.69	11	did not advance	
Tyler Mrak	100 m butterfly S13	1:09.28	20	did not advance	
Tyler Mrak	200 m individual medley SM13	2:27.61	15	did not advance	
Danial Murphy	100 m freestyle S5	1:32.00	14	did not advance	
Danial Murphy	200 m freestyle S5	3:07.41	13	did not advance	
Danial Murphy	50 m butterfly S5	48.34	15	did not advance	
Nathan Stein	50 m freestyle S10	24.34	4 Q	24.00	5
Nathan Stein	100 m freestyle S10	54.56	6 Q	54.43	7
Nathan Stein	100 m butterfly S10	59.06	5 Q	58.64	5
Nicolas-Guy Turbide	50 m freestyle S13	25.54	8 Q	25.52	8
Nicolas-Guy Turbide	100 m backstroke S13	59.93	2 Q	59.55	3rd place, bronze medalist(s)
Nathan Clement; Alec Elliot; Zack Mcallister; Nathan Stein	4 x 100 m freestyle relay 34pts	—N/a		4:12.60	7
Alec Elliot; Jean-Michel Lavallière; James Leroux; Zack Mcallister	4 x 100 m freestyle medley 34pts	—N/a		4:27.78	7

Women

Athlete	Events	Heats		Final	
Athlete	Events	Time	Rank	Time	Rank
Morgan Bird	50 m freestyle S8	31.49	6 Q	31.29	7
Morgan Bird	100 m freestyle S8	1:09.92	6 Q	1:09.67	5
Morgan Bird	400 m freestyle S8	5:25.08	10	did not advance	
Morgan Bird	200 m individual medley SM8	3:07.03	10	did not advance	
Camille Bérubé	100 m breaststroke SB7	1:45.54	9	did not advance	
Tammy Cunnington	50 m freestyle S4	51.97	11	did not advance	
Tammy Cunnington	50 m breaststroke SB3	1:19.78	13	did not advance	
Tammy Cunnington	50 m butterfly S5	53.67 PR	11	did not advance	
Tammy Cunnington	150 m individual medley SM4	3:38.53	11	did not advance	
Danielle Doris	100 m backstroke S8	1:29.20	15	did not advance	
Danielle Doris	100 m butterfly S8	1:21.99	10	did not advance	
Sabrina Duchesne	50 m freestyle S8	34.87	13	did not advance	
Sabrina Duchesne	100 m freestyle S8	1:15.41	11	did not advance	
Sabrina Duchesne	400 m freestyle S8	5:24.51	9	did not advance	
Sabrina Duchesne	100 m backstroke S8	1:32.63	17	did not advance	
Sabrina Duchesne	200 m individual medley SM8	3:17.01	14	did not advance	
Nydia Langill	100 m breaststroke SB6	1:55.56	12	did not advance	
Nydia Langill	200 m individual medley SM7	3:44.41	10	did not advance	
Sarah Mehain	50 m freestyle S7	34.91	8 Q	34.57	7
Sarah Mehain	100 m backstroke S7	1:32.65	11	did not advance	
Sarah Mehain	100 m breaststroke SB7	1:47.94	10	did not advance	
Sarah Mehain	50 m butterfly S7	36.91	4 Q	36.46	4
Sarah Mehain	200 m individual medley SM7	3:14.82	5 Q	3:11.16	5
Aurélie Rivard	50 m freestyle S10	27.83 PR	1 Q	27.37 WR PR	1st place, gold medalist(s)
Aurélie Rivard	100 m freestyle S10	59.89 PR	1 Q	59.31 PR	1st place, gold medalist(s)
Aurélie Rivard	400 m freestyle S10	4:40.86	1 Q	4:29.96 WR PR	1st place, gold medalist(s)
Aurélie Rivard	100 m backstroke S10	1:10.47	4 Q	1:09.62	4
Aurélie Rivard	200 m individual medley SM10	2:33.88	2 Q	2:30.03	2nd place, silver medalist(s)
Tess Routliffe	50 m freestyle S7	34.74	6 Q	33.89	5
Tess Routliffe	100 m freestyle S7	1:15.70	7 Q	1:13.97	6
Tess Routliffe	100 m backstroke S7	1:29.96	10	did not advance	
Tess Routliffe	100 m breaststroke SB7	1:36.34	4 Q	1:35.09	4
Tess Routliffe	50 m butterfly S7	39.26	8 Q	39.17	7
Tess Routliffe	200 m individual medley SM7	3:04.87	2 Q	3:02.05	2nd place, silver medalist(s)
Katarina Roxon	100 m freestyle S9	1:07.19	14	did not advance	
Katarina Roxon	400 m freestyle S9	5:10.62	11	did not advance	
Katarina Roxon	100 m breaststroke SB8	1:21.27	1 Q	1:19.44	1st place, gold medalist(s)
Katarina Roxon	100 m butterfly S9	1:16.93	16	did not advance	
Katarina Roxon	200 m individual medley SM9	2:38.75	5 Q	2:37.87	7
Samantha Ryan	50 m freestyle S10	30.98	18	did not advance	
Samantha Ryan	100 m freestyle S10	1:08.65	17	did not advance	
Samantha Ryan	100 m butterfly S10	1:11.12	4 Q	1:09.73	5
Abi Tripp	50 m freestyle S8	32.39	10	did not advance	
Abi Tripp	100 m freestyle S8	1:10.30	7 Q	1:10.40	7
Abi Tripp	400 m freestyle S8	5:21.09	8 Q	5:16.25	6
Abi Tripp	100 m backstroke S8	1:24.82	10	did not advance	
Abi Tripp	200 m individual medley SM8	2:57.30	8 Q	2:55.08	8
Morgan Bird; Aurélie Rivard; Tess Routliffe; Katarina Roxon	4 x 100 m freestyle relay 34pts	—N/a		4:29.61	5
Morgan Bird; Danielle Doris; Aurélie Rivard; Katarina Roxon	4 x 100 m medley relay 34pts	—N/a		5:01.13	5

== Table Tennis ==
Women

Athlete	Event	Group Matches				Semifinals	Final / BM	
Athlete	Event	Opposition Result	Opposition Result	Opposition Result	Rank	Opposition Result	Opposition Result	Rank
Stephanie Chan	Singles class 7	Wang (CHN); L 2–3	Barnéoud (FRA); W 3–0	Kim (KOR); L 2–3	2 Q	van Zon (NED); L 0–3	Kim (KOR); L 1–3	4

== Wheelchair basketball ==
=== Men ===
The Canada men's national wheelchair basketball team has qualified for the 2016 Rio Paralympics.

During the draw, Brazil had the choice of which group they wanted to be in. They were partnered with Spain, who would be in the group Brazil did not select. Brazil chose Group B, which included Iran, the United States, Great Britain, Germany and Algeria. That left Spain in Group A with Australia, Canada, Turkey, the Netherlands and Japan.

Pos	Team	Pld	W	L	PF	PA	PD	Pts	Qualification
1	Spain	5	4	1	341	265	+76	9 (Note: Head-to-head record: Spain 3 pts, +8 PD; Turkey 3 pts, +1 PD; Japan 3 pts, −9 PD)	Quarter-finals
2	Turkey	5	4	1	327	272	+55	9	Quarter-finals
3	Australia	5	4	1	342	293	+49	9	Quarter-finals
4	Netherlands	5	2	3	264	294	−30	7	Quarter-finals
5	Japan	5	1	4	278	300	−22	6	9th/10th place playoff
6	Canada	5	0	5	222	350	−128	5	11th/12th place playoff

Source: Paralympic.org
Rules for classification: 1) Points; 2) Head-to-head results; 3) Points difference; 4) Points scored.
Notes:

8 September 2016
21:30

Report

Spain	80–46	Canada
Scoring by quarter: 20–11, 23–9, 22–14, 15–12
Pts: A. Zarzuela 22; Rebs: A. Zarzuela 10; Asts: García 7		Pts: Eng 12; Rebs: Hickey 4 Asts: Goncin 5

Carioca Arena 1, Rio de Janeiro
Referees: Carsten Rehling

9 September 2016
18:00

Report

Canada	32–49	Netherlands
Scoring by quarter: 10–9, 9–6, 4–18, 9–16
Pts: Goncin 12; Rebs: Goncin 14; Asts: Goncin, Hedges 3		Pts: Korkmaz 20; Rebs: Groen 7 Asts: Poggenwisch 6

Carioca Arena 1, Rio de Janeiro
Referees: Mati Quintana

10 September 2016
15:15

Report

Canada	53–78	Australia
Scoring by quarter: 16–21, 12–15, 16–22, 9–20
Pts: Eng 17; Rebs: Goncin, Eng 6 Asts: Goncin 5		Pts: Knowles 23; Rebs: Norris 7 Asts: Knowles 6

Rio Olympic Arena, Rio de Janeiro
Referees: Gustavo Mathias

11 September 2016
21:00

Report

Japan	76–45	Canada
Scoring by quarter: 13–9, 22–15, 19–14, 22–7
Pts: Kozai 19; Rebs: Chiwaki 8 Asts: Kozai 7		Pts: Eng 18; Rebs: Goncin 7 Asts: Goncin 6

Rio Olympic Arena, Rio de Janeiro
Referees: Max Kindervater

12 September 2016
19:30

Report

Canada	46–67	Turkey
Scoring by quarter: 9–14, 15–15, 13–22, 9–16
Pts: Eng 15; Rebs: Goncin 8 Asts: Goncin 7		Pts: Gürbulak 24; Rebs: Gezinci, Gümüş 7 Asts: Gürbulak 10

Rio Olympic Arena, Rio de Janeiro
Referees: Max Kindervater

11th/12th place playoff

14 September 2016
19:30

Report

Canada	70–51	Algeria
Scoring by quarter: 13–5, 17–17, 20–15, 20–14
Pts: Goncin 19; Rebs: Miller 7 Asts: Hedges 6		Pts: Guedoun 22; Rebs: Guedoun 8 Asts: Guedoun 8

Rio Olympic Arena, Rio de Janeiro
Referees: Philip Haines

=== Women ===
The Canada women's national wheelchair basketball team has qualified for the 2016 Rio Paralympics. As hosts, Brazil got to choose which group they were put into. They were partnered with Algeria, who would be put in the group they did not choose. Brazil chose Group A, which included Canada, Germany, Great Britain and Argentina. Algeria ended up in Group B with the United States, the Netherlands, France and China.

Pos	Team	Pld	W	L	PF	PA	PD	Pts	Qualification
1	Germany	4	3	1	248	156	+92	7 (Note: Head-to-head record: Germany 3 pts, +9 PD; Great Britain 3 pts, −2 PD; Canada 3 pts, −7 PD)	Quarter-finals
2	Great Britain	4	3	1	228	140	+88	7	Quarter-finals
3	Canada	4	3	1	252	181	+71	7	Quarter-finals
4	Brazil (H)	4	1	3	196	241	−45	5	Quarter-finals
5	Argentina	4	0	4	87	296	−209	4	9th/10th place playoff

Source: Paralympic.org
Rules for classification: 1) Points; 2) Head-to-head results; 3) Points difference; 4) Points scored.
(H) Hosts
Notes:

8 September 2016
09:30

Report

Great Britain	36–43	Canada
Scoring by quarter: 12–14, 12–11, 8–10, 4–8
Pts: Freeman, Conroy 14; Rebs: Freeman 15; Asts: Freeman 5		Pts: McLachlan 21; Rebs: McLachlan 22; Asts: Ouellet 6

Rio Olympic Arena, Rio de Janeiro
Referees: Celine Villard

10 September 2016
9:30

Report

Canada	73–28	Argentina
Scoring by quarter: 24–4, 10–6, 19–8, 20–10
Pts: Young 14; Rebs: Ouellet 6 Asts: Lalonde 6		Pts: Pallares 8 Rebs: Pallares 7 Asts: Olmedo 6

Carioca Arena 1, Rio de Janeiro
Referees: Bill Kuerzi

11 September 2016
10:00

Report

Germany	68–54	Canada
Scoring by quarter: 20–14, 9–17, 16–11, 23–12
Pts: Mohnen 23; Rebs: Breuer 8 Asts: Mohnen 9		Pts: Cindy Ouellet 23; Rebs: Cindy Ouellet 6 Asts: McLachan, Harnock 5

Carioca Arena 1, Rio de Janeiro
Referees: Adam Froczak

12 September 2016
11:45

Report

Canada	82–49	Brazil
Scoring by quarter: 24–12, 25–10, 19–12, 14–15
Pts: Young 22; Rebs: McLachlan 10; Asts: Ouellet 12		Pts: Almeida 12; Rebs: Almeida 8 Asts: Almeida 6

Rio Olympic Arena, Rio de Janeiro
Referees: Jae Geun Lee

Quarterfinal

13 September 2016
11:45

Report

Netherlands	78–60	Canada
Scoring by quarter: 19–18, 23–11, 18–20, 18–11
Pts: Beijer 31; Rebs: Beijer 14; Asts: Huitzing 7		Pts: Ouellet 20; Rebs: McLachlan 11; Asts: Ouellet, McLachlan 5

Rio Olympic Arena, Rio de Janeiro
Referees: Gustavo Mathias

5th/6th place match

16 September 2016
15:15

Report

Canada	63–52	China
Scoring by quarter: 17–12, 9–8, 14–19, 23–13
Pts: Ouellet 20; Rebs: McLachlan 25; Asts: McLachlan 8		Pts: Lei, Dai 17; Rebs: Deng 4 Asts: Long 6

Rio Olympic Arena, Rio de Janeiro
Referees: Gustavo Mathias

== Wheelchair fencing ==
Athlete	Event	Qualification			Round of 16	Quarterfinal	Semifinal	Final / BM	
Athlete	Event	Opposition	Score	Rank	Opposition Score	Opposition Score	Opposition Score	Opposition Score	Rank
Matthieu Hebert	Men's individual épée A	Betti (ITA)	L 4-5	5	did not advance				
Matthieu Hebert	Men's individual épée A	Al-Madhkhoori (IRQ)	L 1-5	5	did not advance				
Matthieu Hebert	Men's individual épée A	Noble (FRA)	L 1-5	5	did not advance				
Matthieu Hebert	Men's individual épée A	Sun (CHN)	L 2-5	5	did not advance				
Matthieu Hebert	Men's individual épée A	Damasceno (BRA)	W 5-1	5	did not advance				
Pierre Mainville	Men's individual sabre B	Triantafyllou (GRE)	L 1-5	4 Q	n/a	Triantafyllou (GRE); L 6-15	did not advance		
Pierre Mainville	Men's individual sabre B	Feng (CHN)	L 2-5	4 Q	n/a	Triantafyllou (GRE); L 6-15	did not advance		
Pierre Mainville	Men's individual sabre B	Castro (POL)	L 1-5	4 Q	n/a	Triantafyllou (GRE); L 6-15	did not advance		
Pierre Mainville	Men's individual sabre B	Cheema (GER)	W 5-0	4 Q	n/a	Triantafyllou (GRE); L 6-15	did not advance		

== Wheelchair rugby ==
Canada national wheelchair rugby team qualified for the Rio Paralympics at the 2015 Parapan American Games after defeating the United States in the gold medal match.

Canada was scheduled to open play in Rio against Brazil on September 14. Their second game was scheduled to be against Great Britain on September 15. Their final game of group play as against the Australia on September 16. Canada entered the tournament ranked number four in the world.

Pos	Team	Pld	W	D	L	GF	GA	GD	Pts	Qualification
1	Australia	3	3	0	0	188	158	+30	6	Semi-finals
2	Canada	3	2	0	1	174	160	+14	4	Semi-finals
3	Great Britain	3	1	0	2	152	135	+17	2	Fifth place Match
4	Brazil (H)	3	0	0	3	125	186	−61	0	Seventh place Match

Source: Rio2016
(H) Hosts
14 September 2016
19:15

Canada	62–48	Brazil
	Report

Carioca Arena 1, Rio de Janeiro
Referee: Lukasz Szymczak, Brian Ward

15 September 2016
12:45

Great Britain	49–50	Canada
	Report

Carioca Arena 1, Rio de Janeiro
Referee: Liam Costello, Mitch Carr

16 September 2016
19:15

Canada	62–63	Australia
	Report

Carioca Arena 1, Rio de Janeiro
Referee: Darren Roberts, Brian Ward

Semifinals

17 September 2016
12:45

United States	60–55	Canada
	Report

Carioca Arena 1, Rio de Janeiro
Referee: Alexander Schriener, Liam Costello

Bronze Medal Match

18 September 2016
09:00

(bronze) Japan	52–50	Canada
	Report

Carioca Arena 1, Rio de Janeiro
Referee: Darren Roberts, Liam Costello

== Wheelchair tennis ==
Canada qualified one competitors in the men's single event, Philippe Bedard. This spot was a result of a Bipartite Commission Invitation place.

Athlete (seed)	Event	Round of 64	Round of 32	Round of 16	Quarterfinals	Semifinals	Final / BM	
Athlete (seed)	Event	Opposition Score	Opposition Score	Opposition Score	Opposition Score	Opposition Score	Opposition Score	Rank
Philippe Bedard	Men's singles	Phillipson (GBR); L 0–6, 1-6	did not advance					

== See also ==
- Canada at the 2016 Summer Olympics
