= Swimming at the 2016 Summer Paralympics – Women's 50 metre freestyle S7 =

Women's 50 metre freestyle S7 at the XV Paralympic Games
- Venue: Olympic Aquatics Stadium
- Dates: 12 September 2016
- Competitors: 11 from 9 nations

Medalists
1st place, gold medalist(s)		McKenzie Coan	United States
2nd place, silver medalist(s)		Denise Grahl	Germany
3rd place, bronze medalist(s)		Susannah Rodgers	Great Britain

The women's 50 metre freestyle S7 event at the 2016 Paralympic Games took place on 12 September 2016, at the Olympic Aquatics Stadium. Two heats were held. The swimmers with the eight fastest times advanced to the final.

== Heat 1 ==
9:48 9 September 2016:

Rank	Lane	Name	Nationality	Time	Notes
1	4	Cortney Jordan	United States	34.07	Q
2	5	Susannah Rodgers	Great Britain	34.42	Q
3	3	Tess Routliffe	Canada	34.74	Q
4	6	Liting Ke	China	34.81	Q
5	2	Judit Rolo Marichal	Spain	37.80	

== Heat 2 ==
9:51 9 September 2016:

Rank	Lane	Name	Nationality	Time	Notes
1	4	McKenzie Coan	United States	32.57	PR Q
2	5	Denise Grahl	Germany	33.28	Q
3	3	Yajing Huang	China	34.50	Q
4	6	Sarah Mehain	Canada	34.91	Q
5	7	Brenda Tilk	Estonia	38.01	
6	2	Erel Halevi	Israel	38.41	

== Final ==
18:05 9 September 2016:

Rank	Lane	Name	Nationality	Time	Notes
1st place, gold medalist(s)	4	McKenzie Coan	United States	32.42	PR
2nd place, silver medalist(s)	5	Denise Grahl	Germany	33.16	
3rd place, bronze medalist(s)	6	Susannah Rodgers	Great Britain	33.26	
4	3	Cortney Jordan	United States	33.33	
5	7	Tess Routliffe	Canada	33.89	
6	2	Yajing Huang	China	34.12	
7	8	Sarah Mehain	Canada	34.57	
8	1	Liting Ke	China	35.62	
