= Swimming at the 2016 Summer Paralympics – Men's 4 × 100 metre medley relay 34pts =

Men's 4 × 100 metre medley relay - 34 points at the XV Paralympic Games
- Venue: Olympic Aquatics Stadium
- Dates: 17 September 2016
- Competitors: from 7 nations

Medalists
1st place, gold medalist(s)		China (CHN)
2nd place, silver medalist(s)		Ukraine (UKR)
3rd place, bronze medalist(s)		Brazil (BRA)

The men's 4 × 100 metre medley relay - 34 points swimming events for the 2016 Summer Paralympics took place at the Rio Olympic Stadium on 17 September 2016.

== Competition format ==
Relay teams are based on a point score. The sport class of an individual swimmer is worth the actual number value i.e. sport class S6 is worth six points, sport class S12 is worth twelve points, and so on. The total of all the competitors must add up to 34 points or less.

== Records ==
Prior to the competition, the World record was as follows:

World record	Russia	4:06:09	Glasgow, Great Britain	18 July 2015
Paralympic record	China	4:09.04	London, Great Britain	9 September 2012

== Final ==
20:43 17 September 2016:

Rank	Lane	Name	Nationality	Time	Notes
1st place, gold medalist(s)	4	Cong Zhou (S8); Furong Lin (SB9); Maodang Song (S8); Yinan Wang (S8)	China	4:06.44	
2nd place, silver medalist(s)	5	Iurii Bozhynskyi (S6); Denys Dubrov (SB9); Maksym Krypak (S10); Ievgenii Bogodaiko (S8)	Ukraine	4:07.89	
3rd place, bronze medalist(s)	6	Daniel Dias (S5); Ruan de Souza (SB9); André Brasil (S10); Phelipe Rodrigues (S10)	Brazil	4:17.51	
4	3	Timothy Hodge (S9); Rick Pendleton (SB9); Brenden Hall (S9); Matthew Levy (S7)	Australia	4:18.08	
5	2	Olivier van de Voort (S10); Duncan van Haaren (SB9); Simon Boer (S9); Thijs van Hofweegen (S6)	Netherlands	4:22.79	
6	1	Robert Griswold (S8); Dalton Herendeen (SB8); Evan Austin (S8); Tye Dutcher (S10)	United States	4:25.50	
7	7	Alex Elliot (S10); James Leroux (SB9); Jean-Michel Lavalliere (S7); Zack McAlister (S8)	Canada	4:27.78	
