= Swimming at the 2020 Summer Paralympics – Men's 400 metre freestyle S10 =

Men's 400 metre freestyle S10 at the XVI Paralympic Games
- Venue: Tokyo Aquatics Centre
- Dates: 1 September 2021
- Competitors: 9 from 9 nations
- Winning time: 3:59.62

Medalists
1st place, gold medalist(s)		Maksym Krypak	Ukraine
2nd place, silver medalist(s)		Bas Takken	Netherlands
3rd place, bronze medalist(s)		Thomas Gallagher	New Zealand

The Men's 400 metre freestyle S10 event at the 2020 Paralympic Games took place on 1 September 2021, at the Tokyo Aquatics Centre.

== Records ==
World record	Maksym Krypak (UKR)	3:57.71	Rio de Janeiro, Brazil	15 September 2016
Paralympic record	Maksym Krypak (UKR)	3:57.71	Rio de Janeiro, Brazil	15 September 2016

== Heats ==
The swimmers with the top 8 times, regardless of heat, advanced to the final.

Rank	Heat	Lane	Name	Nationality	Time	Notes
1	1	4	Bas Takken	Netherlands	4:07.17	Q
2	1	5	Alexander Elliot	Canada	4:14.65	Q
3	2	5	Thomas Gallagher	Australia	4:15.52	Q
4	2	4	Maksym Krypak	Ukraine	4:15.67	Q
5	1	3	Alan Ogorzalek	Poland	4:16.60	Q
6	1	6	Florent Marais	France	4:17.78	Q
7	2	6	Justin Kaps	Germany	4:18.99	Q
8	2	3	Stefano Raimondi	Italy	4:26.82	Q
9	2	2	Dmitrii Bartasinskii	RPC	4:32.51	

== Final ==
400m freestyle final
Rank	Lane	Name	Nationality	Time	Notes

== See also ==
- Swimming at the 2016 Summer Paralympics – Men's 400 metre freestyle S10
