= Swimming at the 2016 Summer Paralympics – Men's 200 metre individual medley SM10 =

Men's 200 metre individual medley SM10 at the XV Paralympic Games
- Venue: Olympic Aquatics Stadium
- Dates: 11 September 2016
- Competitors: 11 from 6 nations

Medalists
| 1st place, gold medalist(s) | | Denys Dubrov | Ukraine |
| 2nd place, silver medalist(s) | | Maksym Krypak | Ukraine |
| 3rd place, bronze medalist(s) | | Dmytro Vanzenko | Ukraine |

The Men's 200 metre individual medley SM10 event at the 2016 Paralympic Games took place on 11 September 2016, at the Olympic Aquatics Stadium. Two heats were held. The swimmers with the eight fastest times advanced to the final.

== Heats ==
=== Heat 1 ===
10:53 11 September 2016:

| Rank | Lane | Name | Nationality | Time | Notes |
|---|---|---|---|---|---|
| 1 | 5 | Dmytro Vanzenko | Ukraine | 2:13.66 | Q |
| 2 | 3 | Olivier van de Voort | Netherlands | 2:13.98 | Q |
| 3 | 2 | Isaac Bouckley | Canada | 2:15.67 | Q |
| 4 | 6 | Sven Decaesstecker | Belgium | 2:16.16 | Q |
| 5 | 7 | Dalton Herendeen | United States | 2:19.56 | |

=== Heat 2 ===
10:57 11 September 2016:

| Rank | Lane | Name | Nationality | Time | Notes |
|---|---|---|---|---|---|
| 1 | 4 | Denys Dubrov | Ukraine | 2:09.23 | PR Q |
| 2 | 1 | Maksym Krypak | Ukraine | 2:11.88 | Q |
| 3 | 5 | Benoit Huot | Canada | 2:13.98 | Q |
| 4 | 6 | Kevin Paul | South Africa | 2:15.09 | Q |
| 5 | 2 | Bas Takken | Netherlands | 2:17.05 | |
| 6 | 7 | Duncan van Haaren | Netherlands | 2:18.41 | |

== Final ==
18:59 11 September 2016:

| Rank | Lane | Name | Nationality | Time | Notes |
|---|---|---|---|---|---|
| 1st place, gold medalist(s) | 4 | Denys Dubrov | Ukraine | 2:06.87 | WR |
| 2nd place, silver medalist(s) | 5 | Maksym Krypak | Ukraine | 2:08.10 | |
| 3rd place, bronze medalist(s) | 3 | Dmytro Vanzenko | Ukraine | 2:10.48 | |
| 4 | 2 | Benoit Huot | Canada | 2:11.85 | |
| 5 | 6 | Olivier van de Voort | Netherlands | 2:13.72 | |
| 6 | 7 | Kevin Paul | South Africa | 2:16.25 | |
| 7 | 8 | Sven Decaesstecker | Belgium | 2:16.94 | |
| 8 | 1 | Isaac Bouckley | Canada | 2:17.33 | |
