= Swimming at the 2016 Summer Paralympics – Women's 200 metre individual medley =

The women's 200 m individual medley swimming events for the 2016 Summer Paralympics take place at the Rio Olympic Stadium from 10 to 17 September. A total of nine events are contested for nine different classifications.

== Competition format ==
Each event consists of two rounds: heats and final. The top eight swimmers overall in the heats progress to the final. If there are less than eight swimmers in an event, no heats are held and all swimmers qualify for the final.

== Results ==
=== SM5 ===
The SM5 event took place on 15 September.

Rank	Lane	Name	Nationality	Time	Notes
1st place, gold medalist(s)	4	Sarah Louise Rung	Norway	3:15.83	
2nd place, silver medalist(s)	3	Teresa Perales	Spain	3:36.14	
3rd place, bronze medalist(s)	5	Inbal Pezaro	Israel	3:38.20	
4	2	Natallia Shavel	Belarus	3:39.61	
5	6	Bela Trebinova	Czech Republic	3:41.76	
6	7	Giulia Ghiretti	Italy	3:48.68	
7	1	Susana Ribeiro	Brazil	3:50.69	
8	8	Wu Qi	China	3:51.08	

=== SM6 ===
The SM6 event took place on 12 September.

Rank	Lane	Name	Nationality	Time	Notes
1st place, gold medalist(s)	4	Ellie Simmonds	Great Britain	2:59.81	WR
2nd place, silver medalist(s)	3	Song Lingling	China	3:03.19	AS
3rd place, bronze medalist(s)	6	Tiffany Thomas Kane	Australia	3:09.78	OC
4	1	Verena Schott	Germany	3:10.44	
5	2	Lu Dong	China	3:13.47	
6	7	Sophia Herzog	United States	3:13.57	
7	8	Nicole Turner	Ireland	3:18.18	
	5	Yelyzaveta Mereshko	Ukraine	DSQ	

=== SM7 ===
The SM7 event took place on 13 September.

Rank	Lane	Name	Nationality	Time	Notes
1st place, gold medalist(s)	4	Nikita Howarth	New Zealand	2:57.29	
2nd place, silver medalist(s)	5	Tess Routliffe	Canada	3:02.05	
3rd place, bronze medalist(s)	3	Cortney Jordan	United States	3:04.17	
4	6	Zhang Ying	China	3:09.28	
5	2	Sarah Mehain	Canada	3:11.16	
6	7	Arianna Talamona	Italy	3:16.97	
7	8	Judit Rolo Marichal	Spain	3:39.68	
	1	Verônica Almeida	Brazil	DSQ	

=== SM8 ===
The SM8 event took place on 17 September.

Rank	Lane	Name	Nationality	Time	Notes
1st place, gold medalist(s)	4	Jessica Long	United States	2:40.23	
2nd place, silver medalist(s)	5	Stephanie Millward	Great Britain	2:43.03	
3rd place, bronze medalist(s)	3	Lakeisha Patterson	Australia	2:45.22	OC
4	7	Jiang Shengnan	China	2:47.15	AS
5	2	Mallory Weggemann	United States	2:48.95	
6	6	Maddison Elliott	Australia	2:49.67	
7	1	Lu Weiyuan	China	2:50.96	
8	8	Abi Tripp	Canada	2:55.08	

=== SM9 ===
The SM9 event took place on 11 September.

Rank	Lane	Name	Nationality	Time	Notes
1st place, gold medalist(s)	5	Lin Ping	China	2:35.64	AS
2nd place, silver medalist(s)	3	Sarai Gascon	Spain	2:35.84	
3rd place, bronze medalist(s)	4	Amy Marren	Great Britain	2:36.26	
4	1	Xu Jialing	China	2:36.48	
5	7	Nuria Marques Soto	Spain	2:37.30	
6	6	Madeleine Scott	Australia	2:37.65	OC
7	2	Katarina Roxon	Canada	2:37.87	
8	8	Claire Cashmore	Great Britain	2:38.34	

=== SM10 ===
The SM10 event took place on 11 September.

Rank	Lane	Name	Nationality	Time	Notes
1st place, gold medalist(s)	4	Sophie Pascoe	New Zealand	2:24.90	WR
2nd place, silver medalist(s)	5	Aurelie Rivard	Canada	2:30.03	AM
3rd place, bronze medalist(s)	1	Bianka Pap	Hungary	2:31.46	
4	3	Lisa Kruger	Netherlands	2:32.81	
5	8	Chen Yi	China	2:33.06	
6	2	Chantalle Zijderveld	Netherlands	2:33.10	
7	6	Harriet Lee	Great Britain	2:34.91	
8	7	Zhang Meng	China	2:36.53	

=== SM11 ===
The SM11 event took place on 16 September.

Rank	Lane	Name	Nationality	Time	Notes
1st place, gold medalist(s)	4	Liesette Bruinsma	Netherlands	2:49.87	
2nd place, silver medalist(s)	3	Maja Reichard	Sweden	2:51.72	
3rd place, bronze medalist(s)	5	Xie Qing	China	2:51.98	AS
4	1	Maryna Piddubna	Ukraine	2:55.31	
5	6	Elisabeth Egel	Estonia	2:55.62	
6	2	Mary Fisher	New Zealand	2:55.71	
7	7	Daniela Schulte	Germany	2:59.08	
8	8	Yana Berezhna	Ukraine	3:07.58	

=== SM13 ===
The SM13 event took place on 10 September.

Rank	Lane	Name	Nationality	Time	Notes
1st place, gold medalist(s)	5	Rebecca Meyers	United States	2:24.66	
2nd place, silver medalist(s)	4	Fotimakhon Amilova	Uzbekistan	2:25.23	
3rd place, bronze medalist(s)	3	Shokhsanamkhon Toshpulatova	Uzbekistan	2:27.31	
4	6	Anna Stetsenko	Ukraine	2:28.95	
5	2	Colleen Young	United States	2:30.85	
6	1	Ariadna Edo Beltran	Spain	2:36.45	
7	7	Alessia Berra	Italy	2:37.91	
8	8	Prue Watt	Australia	2:39.06	

=== SM14 ===
The SM14 event took place on 17 September.

Rank	Lane	Name	Nationality	Time	Notes
1st place, gold medalist(s)	4	Bethany Firth	Great Britain	2:19.55	PR
2nd place, silver medalist(s)	5	Jessica-Jane Applegate	Great Britain	2:27.58	
3rd place, bronze medalist(s)	3	Marlou van der Kulk	Netherlands	2:29.49	
4	6	Pernilla Lindberg	Sweden	2:36.30	
5	2	Michelle Franssen	Belgium	2:36.54	
6	1	Magda Toeters	Netherlands	2:36.56	
7	7	Syuci Indriani	Indonesia	2:40.64	
8	8	Michelle Alonso Morales	Spain	2:44.87	
