= Swimming at the 2016 Summer Paralympics – Women's 100 metre breaststroke SB7 =

Event at 2016 Paralympic Games

Women's 100 metre breaststroke SB7 at the XV Paralympic Games
- Venue: Olympic Aquatics Stadium
- Dates: 10 September 2016
- Competitors: 11 from 7 nations

Medalists
1st place, gold medalist(s)		Elizabeth Marks	United States
2nd place, silver medalist(s)		Jessica Long	United States
3rd place, bronze medalist(s)		Lisa den Braber	Netherlands

The women's 100 metre breaststroke SB7 event at the 2016 Paralympic Games took place on 10 September 2016, at the Olympic Aquatics Stadium. Two heats were held. The swimmers with the eight fastest times advanced to the final.

== Heats ==
=== Heat 1 ===
9:37 10 September 2016:

Rank	Lane	Name	Nationality	Time	Notes
1	4	Jessica Long	United States	1:34.48	Q
2	5	Oksana Khrul	Ukraine	1:39.89	Q
3	3	Veronica Almeida	Brazil	1:42.88	Q
4	2	Vendula Dušková	Czech Republic	1:44.51	Q
5	6	Camille Bérubé	Canada	1:45.54	

=== Heat 2 ===
9:42 10 September 2016:

Rank	Lane	Name	Nationality	Time	Notes
1	4	Elizabeth Marks	United States	1:28.83	PR Q
2	5	Lisa den Braber	Netherlands	1:34.13	Q
3	3	Tess Routliffe	Canada	1:36.34	Q
4	6	Mallory Weggemann	United States	1:37.88	Q
5	2	Sarah Mehain	Canada	1:47.94	
6	7	Meri-Maari Mäkinen	Finland	1:59.79	

== Final ==
17:37 10 September 2016:

Rank	Lane	Name	Nationality	Time	Notes
1st place, gold medalist(s)	4	Elizabeth Marks	United States	1:28.13	WR
2nd place, silver medalist(s)	3	Jessica Long	United States	1:32.94	
3rd place, bronze medalist(s)	5	Lisa den Braber	Netherlands	1:34.66	
4	6	Tess Routliffe	Canada	1:35.09	
5	2	Mallory Weggemann	United States	1:36.06	
6	7	Oksana Khrul	Ukraine	1:38.23	
7	1	Veronica Almeida	Brazil	1:42.41	
8	8	Vendula Dušková	Czech Republic	1:45.29	
