= Swimming at the 2020 Summer Paralympics – Men's 200 metre individual medley SM10 =

Men's 200 metre individual medley SM10 at the XVI Paralympic Games
- Venue: Tokyo Aquatics Centre
- Dates: 3 September 2021
- Competitors: 11 from 10 nations

Medalists
1st place, gold medalist(s)		Maksym Krypak	Ukraine
2nd place, silver medalist(s)		Stefano Raimondi	Italy
3rd place, bronze medalist(s)		Bas Takken	Netherlands

The men's 200 metre individual medley SM10 event at the 2020 Paralympic Games took place on 3 September 2021, at the Tokyo Aquatics Centre.

== Heats ==
The swimmers with the top eight times, regardless of heat, advanced to the final.

Rank	Heat	Lane	Name	Nationality	Time	Notes
1	2	4	Maksym Krypak	Ukraine	2:12.78	Q
2	1	4	Stefano Raimondi	Italy	2:16.65	Q
3	2	5	Bas Takken	Netherlands	2:16.91	Q
4	1	3	Col Pearse	Australia	2:17.41	Q
5	1	5	Alec Elliot	Canada	2:18.01	Q
6	1	6	Alan Ogorzalek	Poland	2:22.79	Q
7	2	7	Tadeas Strasik	Czech Republic	2:24.00	Q
8	2	6	Artem Isaev	RPC	2:25.85	Q
9	1	2	Florent Marais	France	2:27.75	
9	2	2	Ruan Souza	Brazil	2:27.75	
	2	3	Riccardo Menciotti	Italy	DNS	

== Final ==
200m individual medley final
Rank	Lane	Name	Nationality	Time	Notes
1st place, gold medalist(s)	4	Maksym Krypak	Ukraine	2:05.68	PR
2nd place, silver medalist(s)	5	Stefano Raimondi	Italy	2:07.68	
3rd place, bronze medalist(s)	3	Bas Takken	Netherlands	2:11.39	
4	6	Col Pearse	Australia	2:14.20	
5	2	Alec Elliot	Canada	2:15.26	
6	7	Alan Ogorzalek	Poland	2:18.97	
7	8	Artem Isaev	RPC	2:20.37	
8	1	Tadeas Strasik	Czech Republic	2:23.26	
