= Sailing at the 2016 Summer Paralympics =

Sailing at the XV Paralympic Games
- Venue: Marina da Glória; Copacabana
- Dates: 12–17 September 2016
- Competitors: 80 Sailors; 66 Male Sailors; 14 Female Sailors; 23 Nations; 41 Boats

Sailing at the 2016 Summer Paralympics in Rio de Janeiro took place between 12 and 17 September 2016 in Marina da Glória, Copacabana. 80 competitors, 11 of which were female, competed in three keelboat classes. Three sailing events were held. All were mixed events, meaning that men and women can compete together.

== Classification ==
International disability classification in sailing is done by a committee, which gives each competitor a number score with lower numbers corresponding to more severe disability. Sailors are classified under the IFDS Functional Classification System. To take part in Paralympic sailing, an athlete must have a score of 7 or less.

Event	Boat	Classifications
Open Single-Person Keelboat	2.4mR	All sailors are required to have a minimal disability or a higher level of disability as defined in the FCS 2008–12.
Two-Person Keelboat	SKUD 18	Crew shall include a female with disability and one severely disabled sailor with a 1-2 point classification.
Open Three-Person Keelboat	Sonar	The total Sonar crew points shall not exceed 14 points.

== Qualification ==
There are three main routes of qualification. The 2014 IFDS Sailing World Championships provide the first opportunity, gaining places for just over half of the quota places. The 2015 Combined World Championships provide the bulk of the remaining places, while 6 places are reserved for the host country. Each National Paralympic Committee may enter a maximum of one boat per event.

Sailing at the 2016 Summer Paralympics - Qualification
Qualification Event	2.4mR	SKUD 18	Sonar
2014 IFDS Sailing World Championships 15–24 August 2014 Halifax, Canada	Australia; Canada; Finland; France; Germany; Great Britain; Norway; United States	Australia; Canada; Great Britain; Italy; United States	Australia; Canada; Greece; France; Germany; Great Britain; Norway
2015 IFDS Combined Sailing World Championships 24 November – 3 December 2015 Melbourne, Australia	Austria; Italy; Czech Republic; Sweden; Spain; Argentina; New Zealand	Netherlands; Poland; Spain; New Zealand; Singapore	United States; Israel; Ireland; Italy; Spain; Japan
Host nations Quota	Brazil	Brazil	Brazil
41 boats, 80 athletes	16 boats, 16 athletes	11 boats, 22 athletes	14 boats, 42 athletes

== Schedule ==
The three sailing events are held simultaneously across six days of competition, with medals decided on the final day of sailing.

OC	Opening ceremony	Competition Round	●	Medals awarded	CC	Closing ceremony

September 2016	7 Wed	8 Thu	9 Fri	10 Sat	11 Sun	12 Mon	13 Tue	14 Wed	15 Thu	16 Fri	17 Sat	18 Sun	Gold medals
Sailing	OC										● ● ●	CC	3

== Results ==
=== Medal table ===
Rank	Nation	Gold	Silver	Bronze	Total
1	Australia (AUS)	2	1	0	3
2	France (FRA)	1	0	0	1
3	Canada (CAN)	0	1	1	2
4	United States (USA)	0	1	0	1
5	Great Britain (GBR)	0	0	2	2
Totals (5 entries)		3	3	3	9

=== Norlin Mark 3 / 2.4 Metre ===
Rank	Athlete	Race											Points	
Rank	Athlete	1	2	3	4	5	6	7	8	9	10	11	Tot	Net
Gold medal	Damien Seguin (FRA)	5	4	2	2	(6)	5	2	3	2	1	4	36	30
Silver medal	Matthew Bugg (AUS)	3	5	3	1	5	2	1	1	14	(17) DSQ	1	53	36
Bronze medal	Helena Lucas (GBR)	1	2	4	(17) DSQ	3	1	4	2	3	5	14	56	39
4	Dee Smith (USA)	7	1	(8)	6	1	4	5	7	1	5 STP	6	51	43
5	Bjørnar Erikstad (NOR)	4	7	1	4	(11)	8	3	8	5	9	3	63	52
6	Heiko Kröger (GER)	2	3	5	11	2	10	7	6	(15)	2	7	70	55
7	Antonio Squizzato (ITA)	10	6	9	7	4	9	6	5	6	10	(11)	84	72
8	Niko Salomaa (FIN)	9	11	7	9	9	7	(14)	9	4	6	8	94	80
9	Arturo Montes-Vorcy (ESP)	11	12	10	3	8	11	(14) DPI	10	9	3	5	96	82
10	Bruce Millar (CAN)	6	10	(17) DNF	8	17 BFD	3	10	4	7	8	10	101	84
11	Sven Reiger (AUT)	8	8	6	5	7	6	11	12	10	(13)	13	100	86
12	Fia Fjelddahl (SWE)	13	15	13 STP	12	(17) RET	12	8	13	12	11	2	128	111
13	Daniel Bina (CZE)	15	14	11	(17) DNF	17 DNC	14	9	11	8	7	9	133	116
14	Al Mustakim Matrin (MAS)	14	9	(17) DNF	10	10	15	15	15	13	15	15	148	131
15	Juan Fernandez Ocampo (ARG)	(17) DNF	13	17 DNF	17 DNF	17 DNF	16	12	14	11	12	17 DSQ	163	146
16	Antônio Nuno De Castro Santa Rosa (BRA)	12	16	(17) DNF	17 DNS	17 DNC	13	16	16	16	14	12	166	149

=== Skud 18 ===
Rank	Athlete	Race											Points	
Rank	Athlete	1	2	3	4	5	6	7	8	9	10	11	Tot	Net
Gold medal	Daniel Fitzgibbon; Liesl Tesch (AUS)	1	-2	1	1	2	1	1	1	1	1	2	14	12
Silver medal	John McRoberts; Jackie Gay (CAN)	5	1	3	3	4		2	5	2	6	3	46	34
Bronze medal	Alexandra Rickham; Niki Birrell (GBR)	4	3	4	2	1	(DNS)	5	4	4	5	4	48	36
4	Monika Gibes; Piotr Cichocki (POL)	3	(DSQ)	2	4	3		3	2	5	2	1	49	37
5	Ryan Porteous; Maureen Mckinnon (USA)	6	6	6	5	6	2	6	3	-9	4	7	60	51
6	Marco Gualandris; Marta Zanetti (ITA)	2	4	7	7	(DSQ)	DNF	4	9	3	3	5	68	56
7	Rolf Schrama; Sandra Nap (NED)	-8	7	8	8	5	4	7	7	6	8	8	76	68
8	Bruno Landgraf das Neves; Marinalva de Almeida (BRA)	7	8	-10	6	7	6	8	6	8	9	9	84	74
9	Sergio Roig Alzamora; Violeta Del Reino (ESP)	9	-10	9	9	8	5	10	8	7	7	6	88	78
10	Jovin Tan; Qian Yin Yap (SIN)	10	5	5	(DNF)	9	3	DNC	DNC	DNC	DNC	DNC	104	92
11	Hagar Zehavi; Moshe Zehavi (ISR)	(DNF)	9	11	10	10	12			10	10	10	116	104

=== Sonar ===
Rank	Athlete	Race											Points	
Rank	Athlete	1	2	3	4	5	6	7	8	9	10	11	Tot	Net
Gold medal	Colin Harrison; Russell Boaden; Jonathan Harris (AUS)	1	2	5	7	2	2	1	3	2	1	-10	36	26
Silver medal	Alphonsus Doerr; Hugh Freund; Bradley Kendell (USA)	7	3	9	2	3	3	6	2	-10	8	1	54	44
Bronze medal	Paul Tingley; Logan Campbell; Scott Lutes (CAN)	2	8	1	5	9	9	-11	1	7	2	7	62	51
4	Richard Dodson; Andrew May; Chris Sharp (NZL)	8	1	6	4	6	4	8	8	-11	4	2	62	51
5	Aleksander Wang-Hansen; Marie Solberg; Per Eugen Kristiansen (NOR)	5	10	2	3	4	8	9	4	3	-11	6	65	54
6	Lasse Klötzing; Siegmund Mainka; Jens Kroker (GER)	4	5	7	6	8	-10	5	7	5	3	5	65	55
7	Vasilis Christoforou; Anargyros Notaroglou; Thodoris Alexas (GRE)	3	6	3	-10	7	6	4	10	1	9	9	68	58
8	Dror Cohen; Shimon Ben Yakov; Arnon Efrati (ISR)	12	4	4	11	5	7	2	5	-13	5	4	72	59
9	John Robertson; Hannah Stodel; Steve Thomas (GBR)	11	9	14	1	1	1	-15	6	8	10	3	79	64
10	Bruno Jourdren; Nicolas Vimont-Vicary; Eric Flageul (FRA)	6	12	10	12	11	12	3	9	6	-13	8	102	89
11	Antônio Marcos Do Carmo; Herivelton Ferreira; José Matias Gonçalves De Abreu (BRA)	13	11	9	8	-14	11	12	11	4	14	11	118	104
12	Gianluca Raggi; Fabrizio Solazzo; Gian Bachisio Pira (ITA)	-14	13	11	13	12	13	7	12	9	6	13	123	109
13	John Twomey; Ian Costelloe; Austin O'Carroll (IRL)	10	14	12	9	13	5	10	-15	12	12	14	126	111
14	Paco Llobet Balcells; Hector Garcia; Manuel Gimeno (ESP)	9	7	13	-15	10	14	15	13	14	7	12	129	114
