= Marinalva de Almeida =

Brazilian Paralympic sailor

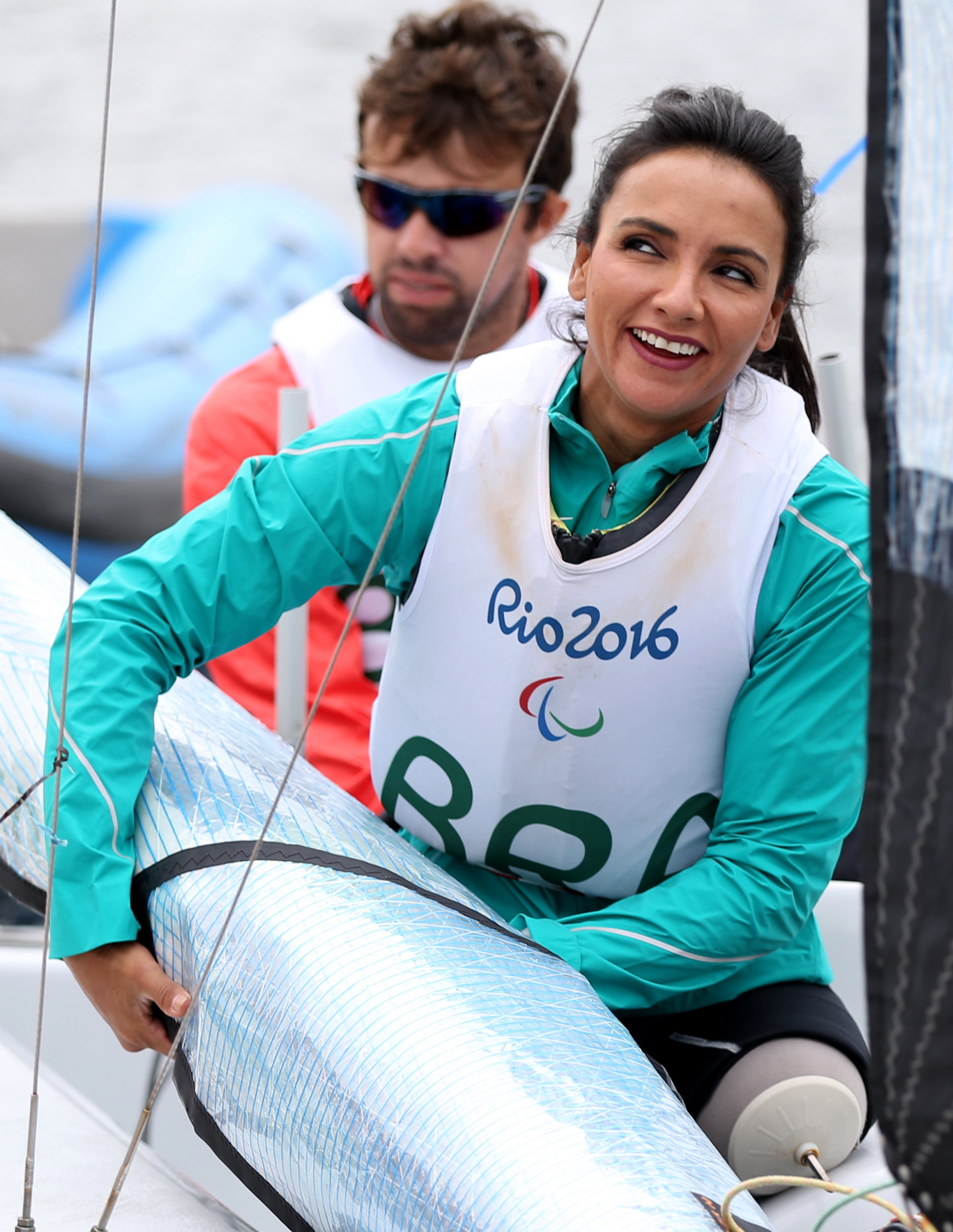
- Almeida and Landgraf at the 2016 Paralympics

Personal information
- Born: 27 August 1977 (age 48) Santa Isabel do Ivaí, Brazil

Sport
- Sport: Athletics, sailing

Marinalva de Almeida (born 27 August 1977) is a Brazilian Paralympic athlete and model.

== Life ==
Almeida was born in Santa Isabel do Ivaí, Paraná in 1977. She and her five siblings moved away when she was four. When she was fifteen and living in Mato Grosso do Sul she had her leg amputated as the result of a car accident. She had borrowed a boy's bike and a car had crushed her leg. Although amputation was the doctors proposed action her mother refused them permission. Her sister's intercession allowed the operation to be performed. As a part of her recovery she tried various sports. A year later she married and had three children in São Paulo state.

She was introduced to sport by a friend who persuaded her to enter a race. She then took a gymnastics course at Senai. An early race was one designed for amputees who at that time completed the 10 km race using crutches. In 2012 she completed a 15 km course on crutches.

Almeida competed in sailing at the 2016 Paralympics, together with Bruno Landgraf. They placed eighth in the Skud 18 class.
