= Routliffe =

Routliffe is a surname. Notable people with the surname include:

- Erin Routliffe (born 1995), New Zealand tennis player
- Tess Routliffe (born 1998), Canadian swimmer
