= Antônio Nuno De Castro Santa Rosa =

Brazilian sailor

Nuno Rosa
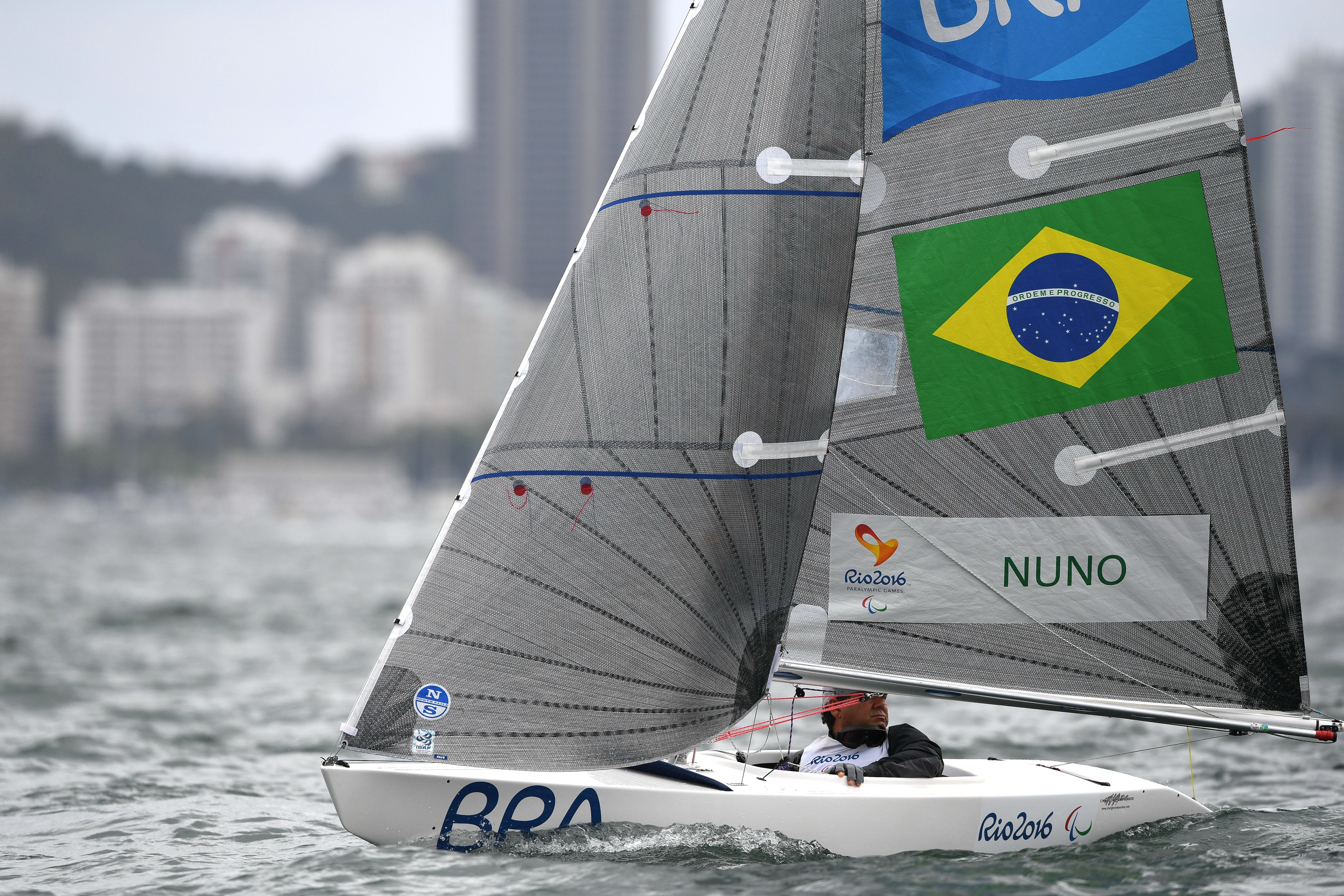
- Rosa sailing the 2.4mR at the 2016 Paralympics

Personal information
- Nationality: Brazil

Sport
- Sport: Sailing

Antônio Nuno De Castro Santa Rosa is a Brazilian sailor who competed at the 2016 Paralympics in the International 2.4mR event. He placed last out of 16 competitors, with a best finish of 12th in the first and last races.
