= Lisa den Braber =

Dutch Paralympic swimmer (born 1992)

Personal information
- Born: 13 September 1992 (age 33)

Sport
- Sport: Swimming
Medal record
Paralympic Games
Bronze medal – third place	2012 London	100 metre breaststroke SB7
Bronze medal – third place	2016 Rio de Janeiro	100 metre breaststroke SB7

Lisa den Braber (born 13 September 1992) is a Dutch Paralympic swimmer. She represented the Netherlands at the 2012 Summer Paralympics in London, United Kingdom and at the 2016 Summer Paralympics in Rio de Janeiro, Brazil.

== Career ==
At the 2009 IPC Swimming European Championships held in Reykjavík, Iceland, she won the gold medal in the women's 100 metre breaststroke SB7 event.

At the 2012 Summer Paralympics held in London, United Kingdom, she won the bronze medal in the women's 100 metre breaststroke SB7 event and, at the 2016 Summer Paralympics held in Rio de Janeiro, Brazil, she also won the bronze medal in that event.

At the 2013 IPC Swimming World Championships she won the silver medal in the women's 100 metre breaststroke SB7 event.

At the 2014 IPC Swimming European Championships she won the bronze medal in the women's 100 metre breaststroke SB7 event and in the women's 400 metre freestyle S8 event.

At the 2015 IPC Swimming World Championships she won the silver medal in the women's 100 metre breaststroke SB7 event.
