= Swimming at the 2016 Summer Paralympics – Men's 100 metre backstroke S10 =

Men's 100 metre backstroke S10 at the XV Paralympic Games
- Venue: Olympic Aquatics Stadium
- Dates: 10 September 2016
- Competitors: 11 from 9 nations

Medalists
1st place, gold medalist(s)		Maksym Krypak	Ukraine
2nd place, silver medalist(s)		Olivier van de Voort	Netherlands
3rd place, bronze medalist(s)		Denys Dubrov	Ukraine

The Men's 100 metre backstroke S10 event at the 2016 Paralympic Games took place on 10 September 2016, at the Olympic Aquatics Stadium. Two heats were held. The swimmers with the eight fastest times advanced to the final.

== Heats ==
=== Heat 1 ===
11:07 10 September 2016:

Rank	Lane	Name	Nationality	Time	Notes
1	3	Denys Dubrov	Ukraine	1:00.78	Q
2	5	Benoit Huot	Canada	1:01.03	Q
3	4	Andre Brasil	Brazil	1:01.08	Q
4	6	Riccardo Menciotti	Italy	1:02.63	Q
5	2	Tye Dutcher	United States	1:05.18	

=== Heat 2 ===
11:11 10 September 2016:

Rank	Lane	Name	Nationality	Time	Notes
1	2	Maksym Krypak	Ukraine	58.25	WR Q
2	4	Olivier van de Voort	Netherlands	58.53	Q
3	5	Michael Anderson	Australia	1:01.02	Q
4	6	Alec Elliot	Canada	1:01.36	Q
5	3	Kardo Ploomipuu	Estonia	1:03.03	
6	7	Janis Plotnieks	Latvia	1:07.96	

== Final ==
19:24 10 September 2016:

Rank	Lane	Name	Nationality	Time	Notes
1st place, gold medalist(s)	4	Maksym Krypak	Ukraine	57.24	WR
2nd place, silver medalist(s)	5	Olivier van de Voort	Netherlands	58.10	
3rd place, bronze medalist(s)	3	Denys Dubrov	Ukraine	59.37	
4	7	Andre Brasil	Brazil	59.55	
5	2	Benoit Huot	Canada	1:00.33	
6	6	Michael Anderson	Australia	1:01.37	
7	1	Alec Elliot	Canada	1:02.45	
8	8	Riccardo Menciotti	Italy	1:02.70	
