= Swimming at the 2016 Summer Paralympics – Men's 100 metre butterfly S10 =

Men's 100 metre butterfly S10 at the XV Paralympic Games
- Venue: Olympic Aquatics Stadium
- Dates: 12 September 2016
- Competitors: 12 from 10 nations

Medalists
| 1st place, gold medalist(s) | | Denys Dubrov | Ukraine |
| 2nd place, silver medalist(s) | | Maksym Krypak | Ukraine |
| 3rd place, bronze medalist(s) | | Andre Brasil | Brazil |

The Men's 100 metre butterfly S10 event at the 2016 Paralympic Games took place on 12 September 2016, at the Olympic Aquatics Stadium. Two heats were held. The swimmers with the eight fastest times advanced to the final.

== Heats ==
=== Heat 1 ===
10:44 12 September 2016:

| Rank | Lane | Name | Nationality | Time | Notes |
|---|---|---|---|---|---|
| 1 | 4 | Andre Brasil | Brazil | 58.27 | Q |
| 2 | 5 | David Levecq | Spain | 58.95 | Q |
| 3 | 3 | Nathan Stein | Canada | 59.06 | Q |
| 4 | 6 | Lasse Andersen | Denmark | 1:00.75 | |
| 5 | 2 | Rick Pendleton | Australia | 1:01.50 | |
| 6 | 7 | Ludvig Nyren | Sweden | 1:02.43 | |

=== Heat 2 ===
10:47 12 September 2016:

| Rank | Lane | Name | Nationality | Time | Notes |
|---|---|---|---|---|---|
| 1 | 4 | Denys Dubrov | Ukraine | 55.29 | WR Q |
| 2 | 5 | Maksym Krypak | Ukraine | 55.54 | Q |
| 3 | 3 | Alec Elliot | Canada | 59.13 | Q |
| 4 | 2 | Riccardo Menciotti | Italy | 59.33 | Q |
| 5 | 6 | Achmat Hassiem | South Africa | 1:00.40 | Q |
| 6 | 7 | Dalton Herendeen | United States | 1:02.57 | |

== Final ==
18:36 12 September 2016:

| Rank | Lane | Name | Nationality | Time | Notes |
|---|---|---|---|---|---|
| 1st place, gold medalist(s) | 4 | Denys Dubrov | Ukraine | 54.71 | WR |
| 2nd place, silver medalist(s) | 5 | Maksym Krypak | Ukraine | 54.90 | |
| 3rd place, bronze medalist(s) | 3 | Andre Brasil | Brazil | 56.50 | |
| 4 | 7 | Alec Elliot | Canada | 58.35 | |
| 5 | 2 | Nathan Stein | Canada | 58.64 | |
| 6 | 6 | David Levecq | Spain | 59.03 | |
| 7 | 1 | Riccardo Menciotti | Italy | 59.65 | |
| 8 | 8 | Achmat Hassiem | South Africa | 1:00.96 | |
