= Duncan van Haaren =

Dutch Paralympic swimmer

Sport
- Sport: Swimming
Medal record
Paralympic Games
Bronze medal – third place	2016 Rio de Janeiro	100 metre breaststroke SB9

Duncan van Haaren is a Dutch Paralympic swimmer.

He represented the Netherlands at the 2016 Summer Paralympics in Rio de Janeiro, Brazil, where he won the bronze medal in the men's 100 metre breaststroke SB9 event.

He also competed in the men's 200 metre individual medley SM10 and men's 4 × 100 metre medley relay 34pts events.
