= Swimming at the 2016 Summer Paralympics – Men's 50 metre freestyle S10 =

Men's 50 metre freestyle S10 at the XV Paralympic Games
- Venue: Olympic Aquatics Stadium
- Dates: 9 September 2016
- Competitors: 19 from 11 nations

Medalists
1st place, gold medalist(s)		Maksym Krypak	Ukraine
2nd place, silver medalist(s)		Phelipe Rodrigues	Brazil
3rd place, bronze medalist(s)		Denys Dubrov	Ukraine

The Men's 50 metre freestyle S10 event at the 2016 Paralympic Games took place on 9 September 2016, at the Olympic Aquatics Stadium. No heats were held. The swimmers with the eight fastest times advanced to the final.

== Heats ==
=== Heat 1 ===
10:06 9 September 2016:

Rank	Lane	Name	Nationality	Time	Notes
1	5	Denys Dubrov	Ukraine	24.01	Q
2	4	Nathan Stein	Canada	24.34	Q
3	6	Alec Elliot	Canada	25.04	Q
4	3	Guy Harrison-Murray	Australia	25.08	
5	2	Tye Dutcher	United States	26.59	

=== Heat 2 ===
10:09 9 September 2016:

Rank	Lane	Name	Nationality	Time	Notes
1	4	Phelipe Rodrigues	Brazil	24.07	Q
2	5	Rowan Crothers	Australia	24.49	Q
3	3	Furong Lin	China	25.36	
4	6	Isaac Bouckley	Canada	25.80	
5	7	Kardo Ploomipuu	Estonia	26.08	
6	2	Lasse Andersen	Denmark	26.51	

=== Heat 3 ===
10:12 9 September 2016:

Rank	Lane	Name	Nationality	Time	Notes
1	5	Maksym Krypak	Ukraine	23.45	Q
2	4	Andre Brasil	Brazil	24.36	Q
3	3	David Levecq	Spain	25.08	
4	6	Shahin Izadyar	Iran	25.32	
5	7	Riccardo Menciotti	Italy	25.77	
6	2	Michael Anderson	Australia	26.31	

=== Swim-off ===
11:39 9 September 2016:

Rank	Lane	Name	Nationality	Time	Notes
1	4	Guy Harrison-Murray	Australia	24.62	Q
2	5	David Levecq	Spain	24.74	

== Final ==
18:45 9 September 2016:

Rank	Lane	Name	Nationality	Time	Notes
1st place, gold medalist(s)	4	Maksym Krypak	Ukraine	23.33	
2nd place, silver medalist(s)	3	Phelipe Rodrigues	Brazil	23.56	
3rd place, bronze medalist(s)	5	Denys Dubrov	Ukraine	23.75	
4	2	Andre Brasil	Brazil	23.78	
5	6	Nathan Stein	Canada	24.00	
6	7	Rowan Crothers	Australia	24.09	
7	8	Guy Harrison-Murray	Australia	24.47	
8	1	Alec Elliot	Canada	24.84	
