= Swimming at the 2016 Summer Paralympics – Men's 100 metre breaststroke SB9 =

Men's 100 metre breaststroke SB9 at the XV Paralympic Games
- Venue: Olympic Aquatics Stadium
- Dates: 8 September 2016
- Competitors: 14 from 10 nations

Medalists
1st place, gold medalist(s)		Kevin Paul	South Africa
2nd place, silver medalist(s)		Denys Dubrov	Ukraine
3rd place, bronze medalist(s)		Duncan van Haaren	Netherlands

The Men's 100 metre breaststroke SB9 event at the 2016 Paralympic Games took place on 8 September 2016, at the Olympic Aquatics Stadium. Two heats were held. The swimmers with the eight fastest times advanced to the final.

== Heats ==
=== Heat 1 ===
10:17 8 September 2016:

Rank	Lane	Name	Nationality	Time	Notes
1	4	Denys Dubrov	Ukraine	1:07.92	Q
2	5	Rick Pendleton	Australia	1:09.38	Q
3	3	James Leroux	Canada	1:10.05	Q
4	6	Isaac Bouckley	Canada	1:12.39	
5	2	Alec Elliot	Canada	1:13.36	
6	7	Lucas Mozela	Brazil	1:14.54	
7	1	Gonzalo Dutra	Uruguay	1:18.10	

=== Heat 2 ===
10:21 8 September 2016:

Rank	Lane	Name	Nationality	Time	Notes
1	4	Kevin Paul	South Africa	1:06.19	Q
2	3	Duncan van Haaren	Netherlands	1:07.33	Q
3	6	Dmytro Vanzenko	Ukraine	1:08.72	Q
4	5	Furong Lin	China	1:09.34	Q
5	2	Shahin Izadyar	Iran	1:09.63	Q
6	7	Ruan de Souza	Brazil	1:13.63	
7	1	Cody Bureau	United States	1:16.79	

== Final ==
18:05 8 September 2016:

Rank	Lane	Name	Nationality	Time	Notes
1st place, gold medalist(s)	4	Kevin Paul	South Africa	1:04.86	
2nd place, silver medalist(s)	3	Denys Dubrov	Ukraine	1:05.10	
3rd place, bronze medalist(s)	5	Duncan van Haaren	Netherlands	1:06.54	
4	2	Furong Lin	China	1:07.12	
5	7	Rick Pendleton	Australia	1:08.27	
6	6	Dmytro Vanzenko	Ukraine	1:08.80	
7	8	James Leroux	Canada	1:10.03	
8	1	Shahin Izadyar	Iran	1:10.82	
