= Alec Elliot =

Canadian para swimmer

Personal information
- Full name: Alexander Robert Elliot
- Nationality: Canada
- Born: July 5, 1996 (age 30) Kitchener, Ontario, Canada
- Height: 1.75 m (69 in)
- Weight: 58 kg (128 lb)

Sport
- Sport: Swimming
- Club: Rouge et Or/ Université Laval
Medal record
Men's para swimming
Representing Canada
Event	1st	2nd	3rd
World Championships	0	0	2
Parapan American Games	0	0	5
Pan Pacific Championships	3	3	1
World Championships
Bronze medal – third place	2019 London	400 m freestyle S10
Bronze medal – third place	2022 Madeira	400 m freestyle S10
Bronze medal – third place	2022 Madeira	100 m backstroke S10
Parapan American Games
Bronze medal – third place	2015 Toronto	S10 400 m freestyle
Bronze medal – third place	2015 Toronto	S10 100 m backstroke
Bronze medal – third place	2015 Toronto	S10 100 m butterfly
Bronze medal – third place	2015 Toronto	S10 100 m butterfly
Bronze medal – third place	2015 Toronto	SB9 100 m breaststroke
Bronze medal – third place	2015 Toronto	SM10 200 m ind. medley

Alexander Robert Elliot (born July 5, 1996) is a Canadian competitive Paralympic swimmer.

== Early life ==
Elliot began swimming at the age of seven years old with the Region of Waterloo Swim Club. After swimming for a year, he took three years off and pursued his interest in minor soccer. At the age of 12, he decided to return to competitive swimming.

Elliot was born with a congenital hand and foot impairment, called Syndactyly, which qualified him for a Para swimming classification of S10, SB9 and SM10 disability classifications from the International Paralympic Committee (IPC). With this international classification, obtained in 2014, he could compete for the Canadian National Para-Swim Team. His first international meet was the Pan Pacific Para Swimming Championships competition, held in Pasadena, California.

== Career ==
At these 2014 Pan Pacific Para Swimming Championships games in Pasadena, Elliot obtained three medals; silver in both the 400m freestyle S10 and the 100m butterfly S10; bronze in the 100m breaststroke SB9.

In 2015 Elliot competed at two major international competitions; the 2015 Parapan American Games held in Toronto, Ontario; and the 2015 IPC Swimming World Championships held in Glasgow, Scotland. At the Parapan American Games, he obtained five bronze medals in the 400m freestyle S10, 100m butterfly S10, 100m backstroke S10, 100m breaststroke SB9, and the 200m individual medley SM10. Elliot did not medal at the 2015 World Championships but did obtain five top-eight individual race finishes at the meet; 5th in the 100m backstroke S10, 6th in the 100m backstroke S10, and 7th-place finishes in each of the 200m individual medley SM10 and the 100m freestyle S10. Additionally, Elliot contributed to two top-eight finishes for the Canadian relay teams; 5th place in the 4 × 100 m medley relay and 6th place in the 4 × 100 m freestyle relay.

At the 2016 Summer Paralympics held in Rio de Janeiro, Brazil, Elliot competed in six individual events and one team relay; however, he did not win any medals at the event. He made finals in three of the individual events placing him, 4th in the 100m butterfly S10, 7th in the 100M backstroke S10, and 8th in the 50m freestyle S10. The other individual events he competed in and his placings were: the 100m breaststroke SB9 (10th), 100m freestyle S10 (11th), and the 400m freestyle S10 (11th). The Canadian team placed 7th in the 34 point 4 × 100 m medley relay which he was a team member of. That team set a Canadian record in the event.

At the 2018 Pan Pacific Para Swimming Championships in Cairns, Queensland, Australia, Elliot won three gold medals and one silver medal. Gold medals were won in the 100m backstroke S10, 100m butterfly S10, and the 200m individual medley SM10. The silver medal was in the 400m freestyle S10.

At the 2019 World Para Swimming Championships held in London, England, Elliot claimed his first career medal at worlds, bronze in the 400-m freestyle S10. He also reached the final in two other individual events, the 200m individual medley SM10 placing 4th and the 50m freestyle S10 placing 8th. Elliot hopes his performance at the 2019 World Para Swimming Championships will allow him to compete at the 2020 Summer Paralympics, scheduled to held August 24 to September 5, 2021, in Tokyo, Japan.
