= Santa Isabel do Ivaí =

Coordinates: 22°58′S 53°14′W

- Municipality
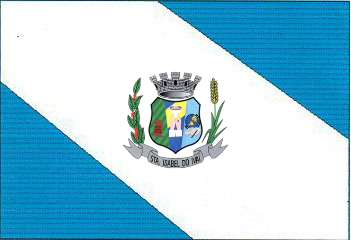
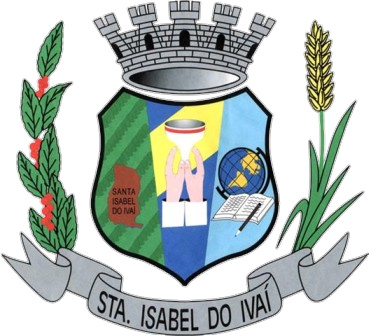
- Flag Coat of arms
- Interactive map of Santa Isabel do Ivaí
- Country: Brazil
- Region: Southern
- State: Paraná
- Mesoregion: Noroeste Paranaense

Population (2020)
  - Total: 8,523
- Time zone: UTC−3 (BRT)

Santa Isabel do Ivaí is a municipality in the state of Paraná in the Southern Region of Brazil.

== See also ==
- List of municipalities in Paraná
