= Jackie Gay =

Canadian paralympic sailor (born 1962)

Jackie Gay (born October 15, 1962) is a Canadian paralympic sailor. Alongside her husband, she won a silver medal at the SKUD 18 – 2 person keelboat during the 2016 Summer Paralympics.

== Early life ==
Gay was born on October 15, 1962. Growing up in South Africa, Gay lost her leg in a landslide with her previous husband in 1994.

== Career ==
Upon moving to Canada and remarrying in 2010, Gay and her second husband John McRoberts sailed with the Royal Victoria Yacht Club and qualified for the 2016 Summer Paralympics. During the 2016 Summer Paralympics, Gay and McRoberts won a silver medal at the SKUD 18 – 2 person keelboat. In recognition of their efforts, the couple was the recipient of the Rolex Sailor of the Year and Sail Canada Sailor of the Month.
