= Bruno Landgraf =

Brazilian footballer (born 1986)

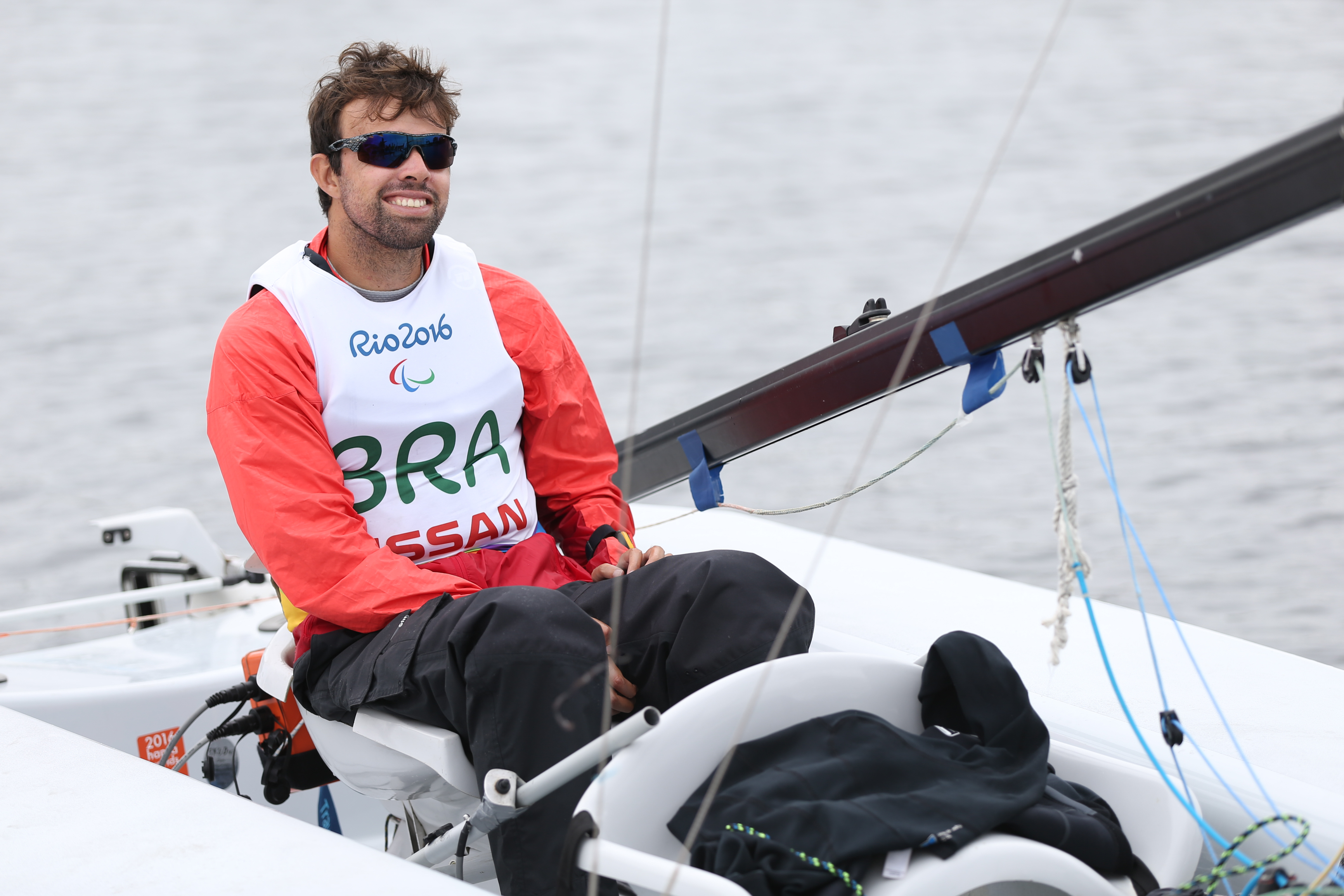

Personal information
- Born: Bruno Landgraf das Neves; 1 May 1986 (age 39) São Paulo, Brazil

Sport
- Sport: Football, sailing
- Club: São Paulo Futebol Clube (football, 1998-2006)

Bruno Landgraf das Neves (born 1 May 1986) is a Brazilian Paralympic athlete and former association footballer. A promising goalkeeper who had won the 2003 FIFA U-17 World Championship with the Brazil under-17 team, Landgraf saw his football career end with a car accident in 2006. While he drove back from his family's home at São Lourenço da Serra along with four friends, he lost control of the vehicle at the Rodovia Régis Bittencourt and had the car roll over. Two of the passengers, a fellow young goalie from Bruno's club São Paulo FC and a female volleyballer, died in the crash, while Bruno was gravely injured. Affected with tetraplegia, he spent eight months at the hospital, three of those unable to talk or eat. In 2009, Landgraf decided to take up sailing as it had opportunities for disabled athletes. By 2011, sailing in the SKUD 18 class with Elaine Pedroso da Cunha, he managed to qualify for the 2012 Summer Paralympics that would happen in London. Landgraf and Cunha finished last overall. Aiming to appear in the next Paralympic cycle, Landgraf moved to Niterói, where he would train with new partner Marinalva de Almeida. At the 2016 Summer Paralympics in Rio de Janeiro, they finished in eighth place.
