= Maksym Krypak =

Ukrainian Paralympic swimmer

Maksym Krypak OS
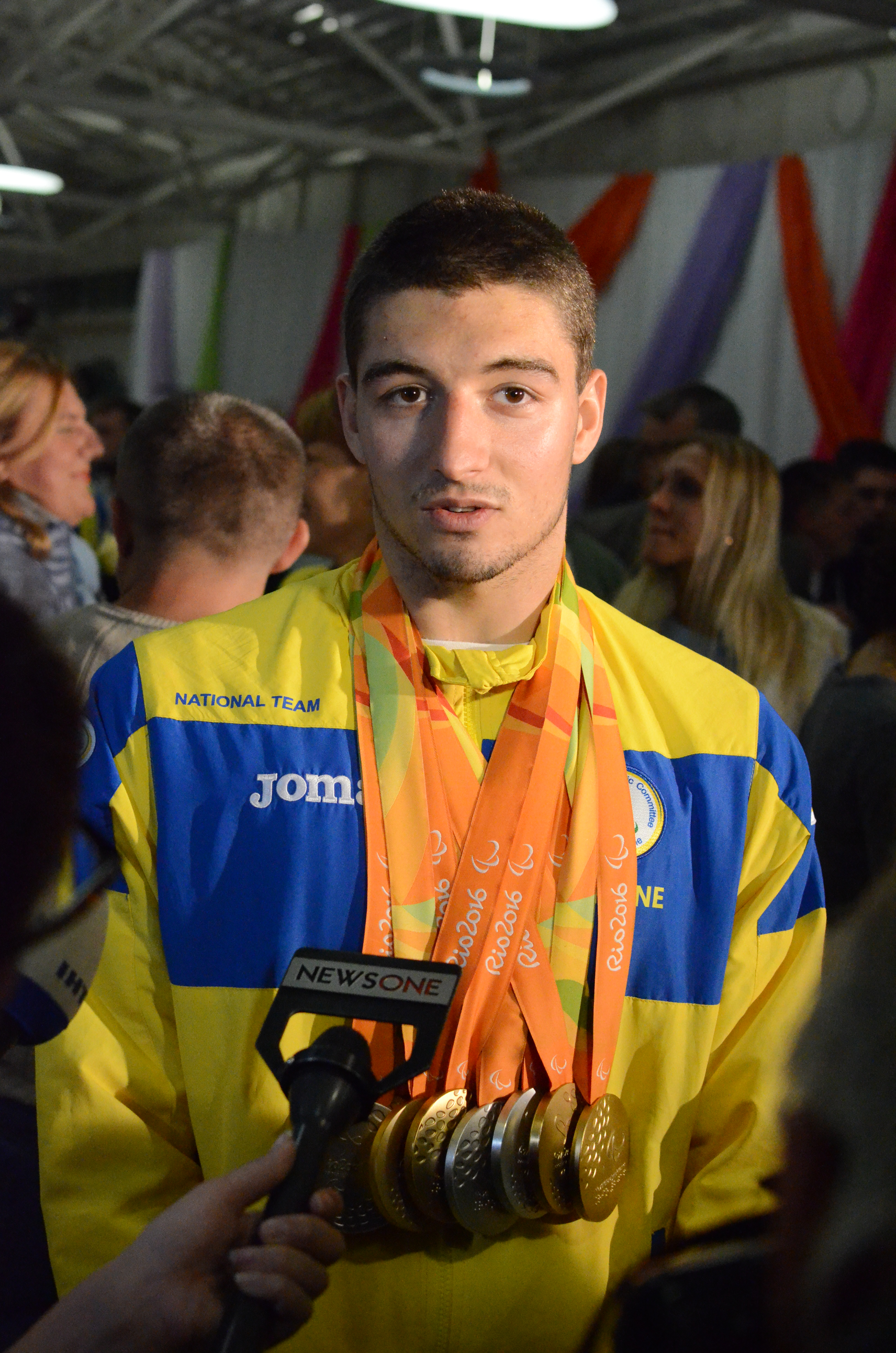
- Born: 23 May 1995; Kharkiv
- Known for: 2021 Best Paralympic Swimmer of the Year
- Awards: Hero of Ukraine
- Sports career
- Full name: Maksym Serhiyovich Krypak
- Sport: Swimming
- Strokes: Freestyle, backstroke, butterfly
Medal record
Men's para swimming
Representing Ukraine
Event	1st	2nd	3rd
Paralympic Games	10	4	1
World Championships	5	1	0
European Championships	10	4	0
Total	25	9	1
Summer Paralympics
Gold medal – first place	2016 Rio de Janeiro	50 m freestyle S10
Gold medal – first place	2016 Rio de Janeiro	100 m freestyle S10
Gold medal – first place	2016 Rio de Janeiro	400 m freestyle S10
Gold medal – first place	2016 Rio de Janeiro	4×100 m freestyle 34pts
Gold medal – first place	2016 Rio de Janeiro	100 m backstroke S10
Gold medal – first place	2020 Tokyo	100 m freestyle S10
Gold medal – first place	2020 Tokyo	100 m butterfly S10
Gold medal – first place	2020 Tokyo	200 m medley SM10
Gold medal – first place	2020 Tokyo	100 m backstroke S10
Gold medal – first place	2020 Tokyo	400 m freestyle S10
Silver medal – second place	2016 Rio de Janeiro	100 m butterfly S10
Silver medal – second place	2016 Rio de Janeiro	200 m medley SM10
Silver medal – second place	2016 Rio de Janeiro	4×100 m medley 34pts
Silver medal – second place	2020 Tokyo	50 m freestyle S10
Bronze medal – third place	2020 Tokyo	4×100 m freestyle 34 pts
World Championships
Gold medal – first place	2019 London	100 m freestyle S10
Gold medal – first place	2019 London	100 m backstroke S10
Gold medal – first place	2019 London	100 m butterfly S10
Gold medal – first place	2019 London	400 m freestyle S10
Gold medal – first place	2019 London	200 m individual medley S10
Silver medal – second place	2019 London	4 × 100 m freestyle relay 34pts
European Championships
Gold medal – first place	2018 Dublin	100 m backstroke S10
Gold medal – first place	2018 Dublin	50 m freestyle S10
Gold medal – first place	2018 Dublin	100 m freestyle S10
Gold medal – first place	2018 Dublin	400 m freestyle S10
Gold medal – first place	2020 Funchal	50 m freestyle S10
Gold medal – first place	2020 Funchal	100 m freestyle S10
Gold medal – first place	2020 Funchal	400 m freestyle S10
Gold medal – first place	2020 Funchal	100 m backstroke S10
Gold medal – first place	2020 Funchal	100 m butterfly S10
Gold medal – first place	2020 Funchal	200 m individual medley SM10
Silver medal – second place	2018 Dublin	200 m individual medley S10
Silver medal – second place	2018 Dublin	100 m butterfly S10
Silver medal – second place	2018 Dublin	4 × 100 metres freestyle relay 34 pts
Silver medal – second place	2020 Funchal	4 x 100 m freestyle medley 34 pts

Maksym Serhiyovich Krypak (Ukrainian: Максим Сергійович Крипак, born 23 May 1995 in Kharkiv) is a Paralympic swimmer from Ukraine who competes in S10 and SM10 (individual medley) events. He won five gold and three silver medals at the 2016 Rio Paralympics, setting new world records in the 100 m backstroke and 400 m freestyle.

Krypak won seven medals at the 2020 Paralympic Games and became the most titled athlete of these games.

== Recognition ==
- Best Paralympic Swimmer of the Year according to Swimming World (2021)
- Hero of Ukraine (2021)
