= Pan Pacific Para Swimming Championships =

The Pan Pacific Para Swimming Championships is an international para swimming event first held in 2011. Like its able-bodied counterpart, the Pan Pacific Swimming Championships, the meet is staged to allow for an international championship-level meet in the non-Paralympic and non-World Championship years.

== History ==
Like the Pan Pacific Swimming Championships, the meet was founded by its four Charter nations: Australia, Canada, Japan, and the United States. As part of the Charter, hosting of the meet is to rotate among these four nations, with the exception to the requirement of the meet being held in Japan every other championship. As of 2018, Japan has yet to host the meet.

Due to the presence of swimming power-house nationals like the United States and Australia, it is regularly used as a staging meet for the Paralympics and World Championships.

== Editions ==
Edition	Year	Location	Dates	Medal table winners
1	2011	Edmonton, Canada	10–14 August	Australia
2	2014	Pasadena, California	6–10 August	Australia
3	2018	Cairns, Australia	9–13 August	Australia
4	2026	Walnut, California, USA	28-30 August	

== Medal table (2011–2018) ==
2011 Pan Pacific Para Swimming Championships medal table

Rank	Nation	Gold	Silver	Bronze	Total
1	Australia (AUS)	35	25	19	79
2	United States (USA)	27	26	16	69
3	Brazil (BRA)	24	13	14	51
4	Mexico (MEX)	14	14	16	44
5	Canada (CAN)	12	0	0	12
Totals (5 entries)		112	78	65	255

2014 Pan Pacific Para Swimming Championships medal table

Rank	Nation	Gold	Silver	Bronze	Total
1	Australia (AUS)	55	24	16	95
2	United States (USA)	34	49	32	115
3	Brazil (BRA)	24	11	10	45
4	Mexico (MEX)	14	14	16	44
5	Canada (CAN)	8	26	29	63
Totals (5 entries)		135	124	103	362

2018 Pan Pacific Para Swimming Championships medal table (Updated after 2018 Championships)

Rank	Nation	Gold	Silver	Bronze	Total
1	Australia (AUS)	43	30	21	94
2	United States (USA)	32	20	13	65
3	Japan (JPN)	19	19	9	47
4	Brazil (BRA)	14	7	5	26
4	Canada (CAN)	14	7	5	26
6	New Zealand (NZL)	6	4	4	14
7	Singapore (SGP)	0	3	0	3
8	Costa Rica (CRC)	0	0	1	1
Totals (8 entries)		128	90	58	276
