= Nikita Howarth =

New Zealand para-cyclist and para-swimmer

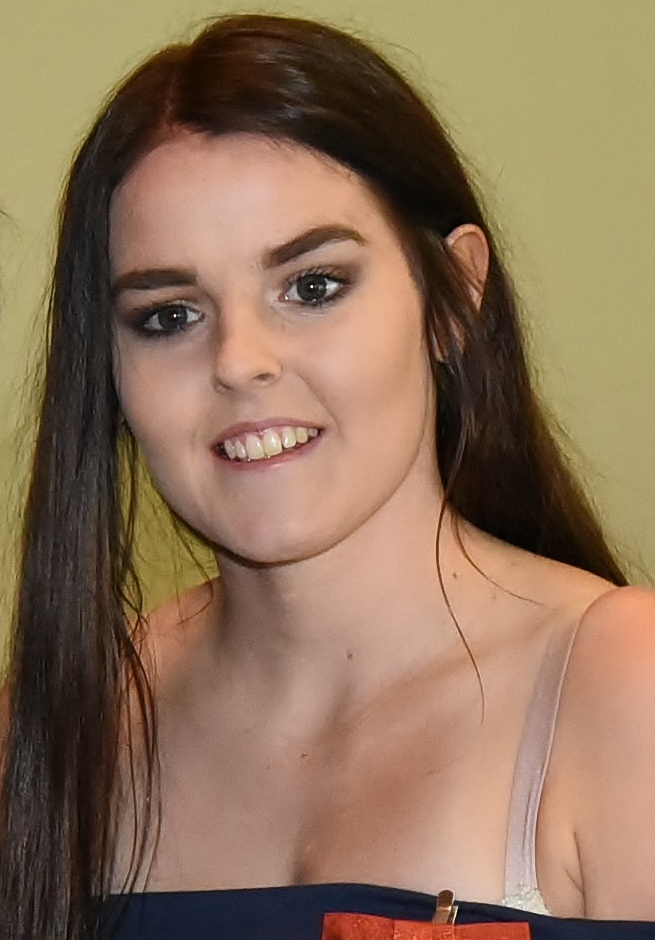
- Howarth in 2017

Personal information
- Full name: Nikita Stevie Howarth
- Born: 24 December 1998 (age 27) Hamilton, New Zealand

Sport
- Sport: Swimming
- Classifications: S7, SB8, SM7
- Club: Te Awamutu Swim Club
- Coach: Steve Hay
Medal record
Women's para swimming
Representing New Zealand
Paralympic Games
Gold medal – first place	2016 Rio de Janeiro	200m medley SM7
Bronze medal – third place	2016 Rio de Janeiro	50m butterfly S7
World Championships
Gold medal – first place	2013 Montreal	200m medley SM7
Gold medal – first place	2015 Glasgow	200m medley SM7
Gold medal – first place	2015 Glasgow	50m butterfly S7
Silver medal – second place	2022 Madeira	100m breaststroke SB7
Bronze medal – third place	2013 Montreal	50m butterfly S7

Nikita Stevie Howarth MNZM (born 24 December 1998) is a New Zealand para-cyclist and para-swimmer. She became New Zealand's youngest ever Paralympian after being selected for the 2012 Summer Paralympics, aged 13 years 8 months. She again represented New Zealand at the 2016 Summer Paralympics, where she won the gold medal in the women's 200 metre individual medley SM7 and the bronze medal in the women's 50 metre butterfly S7.

== Biography ==
Howarth was born in Hamilton, and resides in nearby Cambridge. She has a congenital bilateral arm deficiency, with no right hand and her left arm ending below the elbow. She attended Cambridge High School.

Howarth started swimming at age "three or four" and started swimming competitively at age seven. At age eight, she was inspired to compete at the Paralympics and win a gold medal after 2004 Olympic cycling gold medallist Sarah Ulmer visited Howarth's school. She is classified S7 for freestyle, backstroke and butterfly, SB8 for breaststroke, and SM7 for individual medley.

== Swimming ==
Howarth was selected to represent New Zealand at the 2012 Summer Paralympics in London. She competed in three events: the 50 m butterfly S7, the 100 m breaststroke SB8 and the 200 m individual medley SM7, qualifying for the finals in the latter event and finishing in sixth place. In 2013, Howarth won two medals at the IPC Swimming World Championships in Montreal: a gold medal in the 200 m individual medley SM7 and a bronze medal in the 50 m butterfly S7. She was selected to represent New Zealand at the 2014 Commonwealth Games in Glasgow. Competing above her classifications, she came fifth (out of six) in the 100 m freestyle S8 and seventh (out of seven) in the 100 m breaststroke SB9.

At the 2015 IPC Swimming World Championships in Glasgow, Howarth won two gold medals in the 50 m butterfly S7 and the 200 m individual medley SM7, qualifying her for the 2016 Summer Paralympics in Rio de Janeiro. She was officially confirmed to represent New Zealand at the Paralympics on 5 May 2016.

While competing at the International German Championships in Berlin on 9 June 2016, Howarth set a new world record in the women's 100 m butterfly S7 with a time of 1:18.65, taking 1.49 seconds off the previous record set by American Mallory Weggemann in 2009.

Howarth was a finalist for Disabled Sportsperson of the Year at the 2015 Halberg Awards. She was appointed a Member of the New Zealand Order of Merit in the 2017 New Year Honours, for her services to swimming.

== Cycling ==
Following the 2016 Paralympic Games, Howarth switched her focus from para-swimming to para-cycling, and competed at the 2018 UCI Para-cycling Track World Championships under the C4 classification.

In December 2018, she set a new world record in the C4 flying 200 m time trial event at the Southland Track Cycling Championships in Invercargill, New Zealand.

== Personal bests ==
Swimming

Event	Time	Date	Location	Notes
50 m freestyle (S7)				
100 m freestyle (S7)				
50 m backstroke (S7)				
100 m backstroke (S7)				
50 m breaststroke (SB8)	43.79	1 September 2012	London, England	AR
100 m breaststroke (SB8)	1:28.77	9 July 2015	Glasgow, Scotland	AR
50 m butterfly (S7)				
100 m butterfly (S7)	1:18.65	9 June 2016	Berlin, Germany	WR
200 m individual medley (SM7)				

Cycling

Event	Time	Date	Location	Notes
Flying 200 m time trial (C4)	12.950	1 December 2018	Invercargill, New Zealand	WR
