= Bas Takken =

Dutch para swimmer (born 1999)

Personal information
- Nationality: Dutch
- Born: 3 July 1999 (age 27) Hoorn, Netherlands

Sport
- Sport: Para swimming
- Disability class: S10, SB9, SM10
- Club: De Dolfijn
- Coached by: Sander Nijhuis; Bram Dekker
Medal record
Men's para swimming
Representing Netherlands
Paralympic Games
Silver medal – second place	2020 Tokyo	400 m freestyle S10
Bronze medal – third place	2020 Tokyo	200 m medley SM10
World Championships
Gold medal – first place	2025 Singapore	400 m freestyle S10
Silver medal – second place	2019 London	400 m freestyle S10
Silver medal – second place	2022 Madeira	400 m freestyle S10
Silver medal – second place	2023 Manchester	400 m freestyle S10
Bronze medal – third place	2019 London	200 m ind. medley SM10
Bronze medal – third place	2022 Madeira	200 m ind. medley SM10
Bronze medal – third place	2025 Singapore	100 m backstroke S10
European Championships
Silver medal – second place	2018 Dublin	400 m freestyle S10
Bronze medal – third place	2018 Dublin	4x100 m medley 34 pts
Bronze medal – third place	2026 Kocaeli	200 m ind. medley SM10

Bas Takken (born 3 July 1999) is a Dutch para swimmer who represents the Netherlands in international level competitions.

== Career ==
Takken represented the Netherlands at the 2020 Summer Paralympics in the 400 metre freestyle S10 event and won a silver medal. He also competed in the 200 metre individual medley SM10 event and won a bronze medal.
