= Denys Dubrov =

Ukrainian Paralympic swimmer (1989–2022)

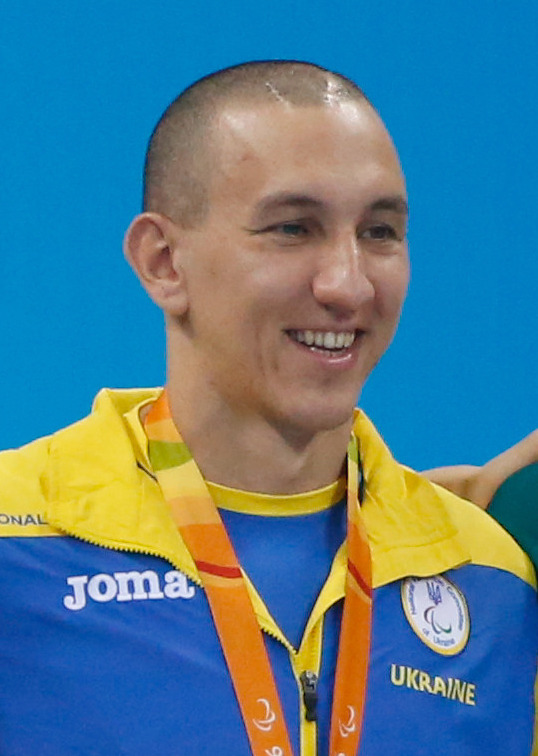
- Dubrov at the 2016 Paralympics

Personal information
- Nationality: Ukrainian
- Born: 10 January 1989 Dnipropetrovsk, Ukrainian SSR, USSR
- Died: 9 May 2022 (aged 33)

Sport
- Sport: Swimming
- Strokes: Individual medley, butterfly
- Club: Invasport: Dnipropetrovsk
- Coach: Svitlana Toloknyanyk
Medal record
Men's para swimming
Representing Ukraine
Event	1st	2nd	3rd
Paralympic Games	4	3	4
World Championships	2	0	1
European Championships	4	3	4
Summer Paralympics
Gold medal – first place	2016 Rio de Janeiro	100 m butterfly S10
Gold medal – first place	2016 Rio de Janeiro	200 m medley SM10
Gold medal – first place	2016 Rio de Janeiro	4×100 m freestyle 34pts
Gold medal – first place	2020 Tokyo	200 m medley SM8
Silver medal – second place	2016 Rio de Janeiro	100 m breaststroke SB9
Silver medal – second place	2016 Rio de Janeiro	400 m freestyle S10
Silver medal – second place	2016 Rio de Janeiro	4×100 m medley 34pts
Bronze medal – third place	2016 Rio de Janeiro	100 m backstroke S10
Bronze medal – third place	2016 Rio de Janeiro	50 m freestyle S10
Bronze medal – third place	2020 Tokyo	100 m butterfly S8
Bronze medal – third place	2020 Tokyo	4×100 m freestyle relay 34pts
World Championships
Gold medal – first place	2015 Glasgow	200 m medley - SM10
Gold medal – first place	2015 Glasgow	100 m butterfly - S10
Bronze medal – third place	2015 Glasgow	4×100 m freestyle
European Championships
Gold medal – first place	2014 Eindhoven	200 m medley SM10
Gold medal – first place	2016 Funchal	400 m freestyle S10
Gold medal – first place	2016 Funchal	100 m butterfly – S10
Gold medal – first place	2016 Funchal	200 m medley SM10
Silver medal – second place	2014 Eindhoven	4×100 m freestyle 34pts
Silver medal – second place	2016 Funchal	100 m breaststroke – SB9
Silver medal – second place	2016 Funchal	4×100 m medley 34pts
Bronze medal – third place	2014 Eindhoven	100 m butterfly S10
Bronze medal – third place	2016 Funchal	100 m freestyle S10
Bronze medal – third place	2016 Funchal	100 m backstroke – S10
Bronze medal – third place	2016 Funchal	4×100m freestyle 34pts
Youth World Championships
Bronze medal – third place	2006 Rio	Boys 200 m medley

Denys Vitaliovych Dubrov (Ukrainian: Денис Віталійович Дубров, 10 January 1989 – 9 May 2022) was a Ukrainian swimmer. A member of the able-bodied Ukrainian National team, he competed in Paralympic S10 and SM10 (individual medley) events. At the 2016 Rio Paralympics he won three gold, three silver and two bronze medals, setting world records in the Men's SM10 200 m individual medley and S10 100m butterfly events. As of April 2017, he still held the able-bodied Ukrainian National Record in the 200 m individual medley, a time of 2:00.53 which he set in 2009.

== Career history ==
Dubrov began swimming as a youth and by 2001 was being coached by Svitlana Toloknyanyk at the Invasport club in his home town of Dnipropetrovsk. He won a bronze medal in the 200 m individual medley at the 2006 FINA Youth World Swimming Championships and represented Ukraine at the 2009 World Aquatics Championships, competing in the heats of the 100 m butterfly, 200 m butterfly, 200 m individual medley and 4 × 100 m medley relay.

Dubrov came to international attention when he competed at the 2014 IPC Swimming European Championships in Eindhoven, where he won three medals, including gold in the SM10 200m individual medley.

The following year Dubrov represented Ukraine again, this time at the 2015 IPC Swimming World Championships in Glasgow. There he entered five events, winning medals in three. He took a bronze as part of the 4 × 100 m medley relay and won individual gold in both the 100 m butterfly and 200 m medley. As well as becoming world champion in two events, he broke the European record in both, with times of 56.43 in the butterfly and 2:11.94 in the individual medley.

== Awards ==
Dubrow was awarded the Order for Merits (third grade) in Ukraine, after his success at the Paralympic Games in Rio de Janeiro. He was named Honoured Master of Sport in Ukraine in 2020.
