= Tess Routliffe =

Canadian Paralympic swimmer (born 1998)

Personal information
- Born: 27 September 1998 (age 27) Auckland, New Zealand
- Height: 1.34 m (4 ft 5 in)
- Weight: 54 kg (119 lb)

Sport
- Sport: Swimming
- Classifications: S7, SB7, SM7
- Club: Dorado Stars Swim Club
Medal record
Women's swimming
Representing Canada
Paralympic Games
Silver medal – second place	2016 Rio de Janeiro	200 m ind. medley SM7
Silver medal – second place	2024 Paris	200 m ind. medley SM7
Bronze medal – third place	2024 Paris	100 m breaststroke SB7
World Championships
Gold medal – first place	2022 Madeira	100 m breaststroke SB7
Gold medal – first place	2023 Manchester	100 m breaststroke SB7
Gold medal – first place	2023 Manchester	200m medley SM7
Silver medal – second place	2015 Glasgow	200 m medley SM7
Silver medal – second place	2019 London	100 m breaststroke SB7
Silver medal – second place	2022 Madeira	200 m medley SM7
Silver medal – second place	2023 Manchester	50 m butterfly S7
Bronze medal – third place	2019 London	200 m medley SM7
Bronze medal – third place	2019 London	4×100 m freestyle relay
Bronze medal – third place	2022 Madeira	50 m butterfly S7
Bronze medal – third place	2023 Manchester	100 m freestyle S7
Commonwealth Games
Bronze medal – third place	2018 Gold Coast	50 m butterfly S7
Parapan American Games
Gold medal – first place	2015 Toronto	50 m freestyle S7
Gold medal – first place	2015 Toronto	100 m freestyle S7
Gold medal – first place	2015 Toronto	100 m backstroke S7
Gold medal – first place	2015 Toronto	100 m breaststroke SB7
Silver medal – second place	2015 Toronto	200 m medley SM8

Tess Routliffe (born 27 September 1998) is a Canadian Paralympic swimmer and winner of multiple world championship and Paralympic medals. She represented Canada at the 2016 Summer Paralympics in Rio de Janeiro, where she won the silver medal in the women's 200 m individual medley SM7.

== Early life and education ==
Routliffe is the youngest of three daughters and was born in Auckland, New Zealand while her parents Robert Routliffe and Catherine MacLennan, were on an around-the-world sailing adventure. She was born with hypochondroplasia. Her family moved back to Canada when she was six months old, eventually settling in Caledon, Ontario. She has two sisters, Tara and Erin, the latter a tennis Grand Slam event winner in women's doubles. Routliffe began swimming at age 3 with the Dorado Stars in Caledon.

Routliffe attended Mayfield Secondary School in Caledon. She has a degree in communications and human relations from Concordia University.

== Career ==
Routliffe began competitive swimming at age 14. She made six finals and won silver in the 100m backstroke at the 2014 Pan Pacific Para-Swimming Championships when she was 16. In 2014, she was awarded the Para Swimming Athlete of the Year Award at the Swim Ontario Annual General Meeting. She won six medals at the 2015 Speedo Cam Am Para Swimming Championships in Toronto.

Routliffe made her international para-swimming debut at the 2015 Parapan Am Games in Toronto. She won gold medals in the 50-metre and 100-metre freestyle, the 100-metre breaststroke, and the 100-metre backstroke, and a silver medal in the 200-metre individual medley. At the 2015 International Paralympic Committee World Championships in Glasgow, Scotland, she won silver in the 200-metre individual medley and finished fourth in four other races. Mike Thompson recruited her to the Swimming Canada's Para-swimming Intensive Training Program in Quebec.

At the Rio 2016 Paralympics, Routliffe won silver in the SM7 200-m individual medley, establishing a new Canadian record. She also made it to five individual finals at the Games. She won bronze in the 200-metre individual medley at the 2019 World Para Swimming Championships, her first career medal at worlds.

Routliffe missed the Tokyo 2020 Paralympic Games after breaking her spine at the L1 vertebra while weight training. She made her return to competition at the 2022 Bell Canadian Swimming Trials, where she won the multi-class 100-m breaststroke. At the 2022 World Para Swimming Championships she won gold in the 100-metre breaststroke SB7, silver in the 200 individual medley SM7, and bronze in the 50 butterfly S7.

At the 2023 World Para Swimming Championships in Manchester, she won gold in the women's SM7 200m medley and the women's 100m breaststroke SB7, silver in the women's 50m butterfly S7, and a bronze in the women's 100-metre freestyle S7. Routliffe is set to compete in the women's 50m butterfly S7, 100m breaststroke SB7 and 200m individual medley SM7 at the 2024 Summer Paralympics.

== Personal life ==
Her oldest sister, Erin, is a professional tennis player who represents New Zealand. Her other sister, Tara, played NCAA college volleyball.
