= Olivier van de Voort =

Dutch Paralympic swimmer (born 1997)

Personal information
- Nationality: Dutch
- Born: 2 October 1997 (age 28)

Sport
- Sport: Para swimming
- Disability class: S10
Medal record
Men's para swimming
Representing Netherlands
Paralympic Games
Gold medal – first place	2024 Paris	100 m backstroke S10
Silver medal – second place	2016 Rio de Janeiro	100 m backstroke S10
Silver medal – second place	2024 Paris	Mixed 4×100 m medley relay 34pts
World Championships
Gold medal – first place	2025 Singapore	100 m backstroke S10
European Championships
Gold medal – first place	2024 Funchal	Mixed 4×100 m medley relay 34pts
Gold medal – first place	2024 Funchal	100 m backstroke S10
Gold medal – first place	2026 Kocaeli	100 m backstroke S10

Olivier van de Voort (born 2 October 1997) is a Dutch para swimmer.

== Career ==
In April 2024, he represented the Netherlands at the 2024 World Para Swimming European Open Championships and won gold medals in the mixed 4×100 metre medley relay 34pts and 100 metres backstroke S10 events. He then represented the Netherlands at the 2024 Summer Paralympics and won a silver medal in the mixed 4 × 100 metre medley relay 34pts.
