= Judit Rolo Marichal =

Spanish Paralympic swimmer

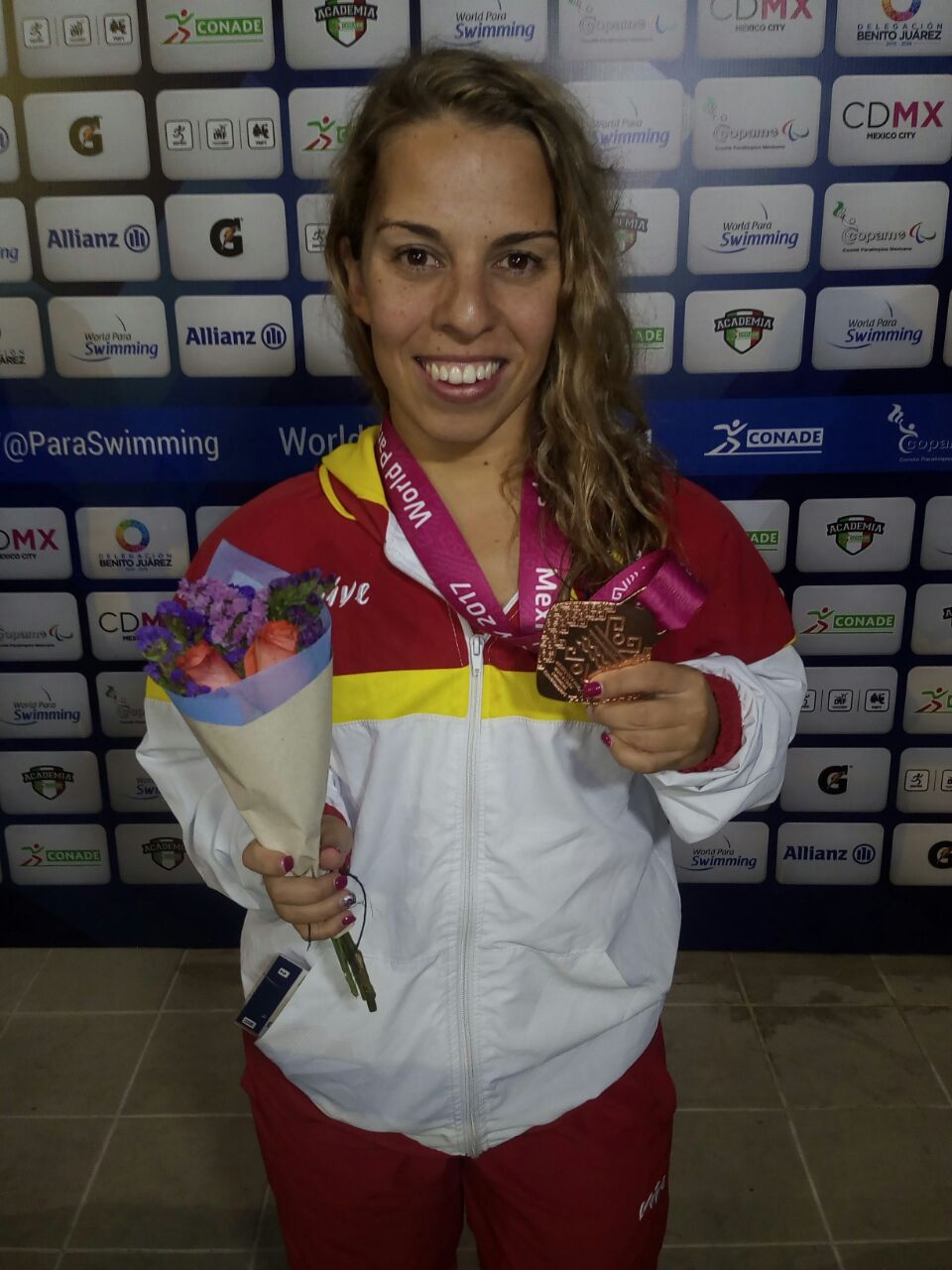

Personal information
- Born: 30 October 1990 (age 35) San Cristóbal de La Laguna, Spain
- Height: 1.32 m (4 ft 4 in)

Sport
- Country: Spain
- Sport: Paralympic swimming
- Disability: Hypochondroplasia
- Disability class: S7
- Club: CD Midayu Tenerife
- Coached by: Jose Luis Guadalupe
Medal record
Paralympic swimming
Representing Spain
World Championships
Silver medal – second place	2017 Mexico City	Women's 200m individual medley SM7
Bronze medal – third place	2017 Mexico City	Women's 50m butterfly S7
European Championships
Silver medal – second place	2016 Funchal	Women's 50m butterfly
Silver medal – second place	2018 Dublin	Women's 50m butterfly
Bronze medal – third place	2016 Funchal	Women's 4x50m medley relay 20pts

Judit Rolo Marichal (born 30 October 1990) is a Spanish Paralympic swimmer who competes in international level events.
