= Swimming at the 2016 Summer Paralympics =

Swimming at the XV Paralympic Games
- Venue: Olympic Aquatics Stadium
- Dates: 8–17 September 2016
- Competitors: 595 from 80 nations

Swimming at the 2016 Paralympic Games was held from 8 to 17 September 2016 at Rio Olympic Aquatics Stadium. The competition consisted of 152 events, across multiple classifications, and all swum in a long course (50-metre) pool. Up to 600 swimmers (340 males, 260 females) competed in the Games. With 152 events, swimming came second only to athletics as the largest sport at the 2016 Games.

== Events ==
152 events over two genders (with one mixed relay), across 14 classification and four strokes were contested during the Games. Below is a summary of the events that were contested at the 2016 Games :

Swimming at the 2016 Summer Paralympics - Events (152)
Classification → Event ↓	Motor and physical impairments										Visual impairments			ID
Classification → Event ↓	S1	S2	S3	S4	S5	S6	S7	S8	S9	S10	S11	S12	S13	S14
Classification → Event ↓	SB1	SB2	SB3	SB4	SB5	SB6	SB7	SB8	SB9	SB10	SB11	SB12	SB13	SB14
Classification → Event ↓	SM1	SM2	SM3	SM4	SM5	SM6	SM7	SM8	SM9	SM10	SM11	SM12	SM13	SM14
	Freestyle													
50 metre freestyle			●	● - o	● - o	● - o	● - o	● - o	● - o	● - o	● - o	● - o	● - o	
100 metre freestyle			o	●	● - o	● - o	● - o	● - o	● - o	● - o	● - o		● - o	
200 metre freestyle		●	●	●	● - o									● - o
400 metre freestyle						● - o	● - o	● - o	● - o	● - o	● - o		● - o	
	Backstroke													
50 metre backstroke	●	● - o	● - o	● - o	● - o									
100 metre backstroke	●	● - o				● - o	● - o	● - o	● - o	● - o	● - o	● - o	● - o	● - o
	Butterfly													
50 metre butterfly					● - o	● - o	● - o							
100 metre butterfly								● - o	● - o	● - o	●		● - o	
	Breaststroke													
50 metre breaststroke		●	● - o											
100 metre breaststroke				● - o	● - o	● - o	● - o	● - o	● - o		● - o	●	● - o	● - o
	Medley													
150 metre Individual Medley			●	● - o										
200 metre individual medley					o	● - o	● - o	● - o	● - o	● - o	● - o		● - o	● - o
	Relays													
4 × 100 metre freestyle relay 34 points	●●●● - oooo													
4 × 100 metre medley relay 34 points	●●●● - oooo													
4 × 50 metre freestyle relay 20 points	●o●o													

Key:

- ID : Intellectual impairments
- S : Freestyle, butterfly and backstroke classification -
- SB : breaststroke classification -
- SM : Medley classification
- ● : men's event in this classification -
- o : women's event in this classification
- ●●●● : men's relay event across these classifications -
- oooo : women's relay event across these classifications
- ●o●o : mixed relay event across these classifications

== Event schedule ==
The schedule for the swimming events in the 2016 Summer Paralympics is reproduced below; in all cases, heats in each event were held in the morning, and the finals and victory ceremonies of the events were held on the evenings of the same day

Date →		8	9	10	11	12	13	14	15	16	17
50 m freestyle	Men; Details		S7; S10	S6		S11; S5	S9; S3	S13		S8	S12; S4
50 m freestyle	Women; Details		S7; S10	S6		S11; S5	S9	S13		S8	S12; S4
100 m freestyle	Men; Details	S4			S8	S9	S10		S11	S7; S13	S6; S5
100 m freestyle	Women; Details	S3			S8	S9	S10		S11	S7; S13	S6; S5
200 m freestyle	Men; Details	S5			S14; S2		S4		S3		
200 m freestyle	Women; Details	S5			S14						
400 m freestyle	Men; Details	S8	S9	S11		S13	S6	S7	S10		
400 m freestyle	Women; Details	S8	S9	S11		S13	S6	S7	S10		
50 m backstroke	Men; Details			S3					S1; S2	S4; S5	
50 m backstroke	Women; Details			S3					S2	S4; S5	
100 m backstroke	Men; Details	S6; S14; S7	S1; S2; S11	S10			S8	S12		S9	S13
100 m backstroke	Women; Details	S6; S14; S7	S2; S11	S10			S8	S12		S9	S13
50 m breaststroke	Men; Details							SB2; SB3			
50 m breaststroke	Women; Details							SB3			
100 m breaststroke	Men; Details	SB9		SB7	SB5; SB13; SB4		SB11; SB12	SB8; SB14	SB6		
100 m breaststroke	Women; Details	SB9		SB7	SB5; SB13; SB4		SB11	SB8; SB14	SB6		
50 m butterfly	Men; Details		S6	S5		S7					
50 m butterfly	Women; Details		S6	S5		S7					
100 m butterfly	Men; Details	S13	S8			S10		S11	S9		
100 m butterfly	Women; Details	S13	S8			S10			S9		
150 m individual medley	Men; Details					SM4			SM3		
150 m individual medley	Women; Details					SM4					
200 m individual medley	Men; Details			SM13	SM9; SM10	SM6	SM7			SM11	
200 m individual medley	Women; Details			SM13	SM9; SM10	SM6	SM7		SM5	SM11	SM8; SM14
Freestyle relays	Men		4×50 m 20pts					4×100 m 34pts			
Freestyle relays	Women		4×50 m 20pts						4×100 m 34pts		
Medley relays	Men										4×100 m 34pts
Medley relays	Women									4×100 m 34pts	

== Medal table ==
Rank	Nation	Gold	Silver	Bronze	Total
1	China (CHN)	37	30	25	92
2	Ukraine (UKR)	25	24	25	74
3	Great Britain (GBR)	16	16	15	47
4	United States (USA)	14	14	9	37
5	Australia (AUS)	9	10	10	29
6	Belarus (BLR)	7	0	1	8
7	Spain (ESP)	6	8	3	17
8	New Zealand (NZL)	6	2	2	10
9	Brazil (BRA)	4	7	8	19
10	Netherlands (NED)	4	6	11	21
11	Canada (CAN)	4	2	2	8
12	South Korea (KOR)	4	1	0	5
13	Italy (ITA)	2	8	3	13
14	Uzbekistan (UZB)	2	4	6	12
15	Norway (NOR)	2	1	3	6
16	Singapore (SIN)	2	0	1	3
17	Colombia (COL)	1	4	2	7
18	Hungary (HUN)	1	2	5	8
19	Sweden (SWE)	1	2	2	5
20	Czech Republic (CZE)	1	1	1	3
21	Cuba (CUB)	1	0	1	2
22	Greece (GRE)	1	0	0	1
22	Hong Kong (HKG)	1	0	0	1
22	Kazakhstan (KAZ)	1	0	0	1
22	South Africa (RSA)	1	0	0	1
26	Azerbaijan (AZE)	0	3	0	3
27	Japan (JPN)	0	2	5	7
28	Germany (GER)	0	2	1	3
29	France (FRA)	0	1	2	3
30	Poland (POL)	0	1	1	2
31	Vietnam (VIE)	0	1	0	1
32	Mexico (MEX)	0	0	4	4
33	Austria (AUT)	0	0	1	1
33	Denmark (DEN)	0	0	1	1
33	Ireland (IRL)	0	0	1	1
33	Israel (ISR)	0	0	1	1
Totals (36 entries)		153	152	152	457

== Medalists ==
=== Multiple medalists ===
Rank	Athlete	Gold	Silver	Bronze	Total
1	Ihar Boki (BLR)	6	0	1	7
2	Maksym Krypak (UKR)	5	3	0	8
3	Huang Wenpan (CHN)	5	1	0	6
4	Daniel Dias (BRA)	4	3	2	9
4	Yelyzaveta Mereshko (UKR)	4	3	2	9
6	Zhang Li (CHN)	4	0	1	5
7	Ievgenii Bogodaiko (UKR)	3	3	2	8
7	Denys Dubrov (UKR)	3	3	2	8
9	Maddison Elliott (AUS)	3	2	0	5
9	Sophie Pascoe (NZL)	3	2	0	5
11	McKenzie Coan (USA)	3	1	1	5
12	Anna Stetsenko (UKR)	3	1	0	4
12	Bradley Snyder (USA)	3	1	0	4
12	Aurelie Rivard (CAN)	3	1	0	4
12	Zou Liankang (CHN)	3	1	0	4
12	Bethany Firth (GBR)	3	1	0	4
12	Rebecca Meyers (USA)	3	1	0	4
18	Wang Yinan (CHN)	3	0	2	5
19	Pan Shiyun (CHN)	3	0	0	3
19	Cheng Jiao (CHN)	3	0	0	3
19	Jo Gi-seong (KOR)	3	0	0	3
19	Xu Qing (CHN)	3	0	0	3
Totals (22 entries)		76	27	13	116

=== Men's events ===
Event	Class	Gold	Silver	Bronze
50 m backstroke	S1	Hennadii Boiko; Ukraine	Francesco Bettella; Italy	Anton Kol; Ukraine
100 m backstroke	S1	Hennadii Boiko; Ukraine	Francesco Bettella; Italy	Anton Kol; Ukraine
200 m freestyle	S2	Liu Benying; China	Zou Liankang; China	Serhii Palamarchuk; Ukraine
50 m backstroke	S2	Zou Liankang; China	Liu Benying; China	Serhii Palamarchuk; Ukraine
100 m backstroke	S2	Zou Liankang; China	Liu Benying; China	Serhii Palamarchuk; Ukraine
50 m freestyle	S3	Huang Wenpan; China	Dmytro Vynohradets; Ukraine	Li Hanhua; China
200 m freestyle	S3	Huang Wenpan; China	Dmytro Vynohradets; Ukraine	Li Hanhua; China
50 m backstroke	S3	Dmytro Vynohradets; Ukraine	Huang Wenpan; China	Vincenzo Boni; Italy
50 m breaststroke	SB2	Huang Wenpan; China	Li Tingshen; China	Huang Chaowen; China
150 m individual medley	SM3	Huang Wenpan; China	Dmytro Vynohradets; Ukraine	Du Jianping; China
50 m freestyle	S4	Jo Gi-seong; South Korea	David Smétanine; France	Andrii Derevinskyi; Ukraine
100 m freestyle	S4	Jo Gi-seong; South Korea	Jin Zhipeng; China	Michael Schoenmaker; Netherlands
200 m freestyle	S4	Jo Gi-seong; South Korea	Michael Schoenmaker; Netherlands	Jin Zhipeng; China
50 m backstroke	S4	Arnošt Petráček; Czech Republic	Liu Yuntao; China	Jesús Hernández Hernández; Mexico
50 m breaststroke	SB3	Jin Zhipeng; China	Miguel Luque; Spain	Efrem Morelli; Italy
150 m individual medley	SM4	Cameron Leslie; New Zealand	Jin Zhipeng; China	Jonas Larsen; Denmark
50 m freestyle	S5	Daniel Dias; Brazil	Võ Thanh Tùng; Vietnam	Roy Perkins; United States
100 m freestyle	S5	Daniel Dias; Brazil	Roy Perkins; United States	Andrew Mullen; Great Britain
200 m freestyle	S5	Daniel Dias; Brazil	Roy Perkins; United States	Andrew Mullen; Great Britain
50 m backstroke	S5	Daniel Dias; Brazil	Andrew Mullen; Great Britain	Zsolt Vereczkei; Hungary
50 m butterfly	S5	Roy Perkins; United States	He Shiwei; China	Daniel Dias; Brazil
100 m breaststroke	SB4	Li Junsheng; China	Daniel Dias; Brazil	Moisés Fuentes; Colombia
50 m freestyle	S6	Xu Qing; China	Nelson Crispín; Colombia	Jia Hongguang; China
100 m freestyle	S6	Lorenzo Perez Escalona; Cuba	Nelson Crispín; Colombia	Oleksandr Komarov; Ukraine
400 m freestyle	S6	Francesco Bocciardo; Italy	Thijs van Hofweegen; Netherlands	Lorenzo Perez Escalona; Cuba
100 m backstroke	S6	Zheng Tao; China	Jia Hongguang; China	Iaroslav Semenenko; Ukraine
50 m butterfly	S6	Xu Qing; China	Zheng Tao; China	Wang Lichao; China
100 m breaststroke	SB5	Karl Forsman; Sweden	Lim Woo-geun; South Korea	Pedro Rangel; Mexico
200 m individual medley	SM6	Sascha Kindred; Great Britain	Jia Hongguang; China	Talisson Glock; Brazil
50 m freestyle	S7	Pan Shiyun; China	Ievgenii Bogodaiko; Ukraine	Carlos Serrano Zárate; Colombia
100 m freestyle	S7	Pan Shiyun; China	Carlos Serrano Zárate; Colombia	Ievgenii Bogodaiko; Ukraine
400 m freestyle	S7	Michael Jones; Great Britain	Jonathan Fox; Great Britain	Andreas Skaar Bjornstad; Norway
100 m backstroke	S7	Ievgenii Bogodaiko; Ukraine	Jonathan Fox; Great Britain	Italo Pereira; Brazil
50 m butterfly	S7	Pan Shiyun; China	Ievgenii Bogodaiko; Ukraine	Wang Jingang; China
100 m breaststroke	SB6	Ievgenii Bogodaiko; Ukraine	Nelson Crispín; Colombia	Torben Schmidtke; Germany
200 m individual medley	SM7	Ievgenii Bogodaiko; Ukraine	Rudy Garcia-Tolson; United States	Matthew Levy; Australia
50 m freestyle	S8	Wang Yinan; China	Bohdan Hrynenko; Ukraine	Iurii Bozhynskyi; Ukraine
100 m freestyle	S8	Wang Yinan; China	Song Maodang; China	Josef Craig; Great Britain
400 m freestyle	S8	Oliver Hynd; Great Britain	Xu Haijiao; China	Wang Yinan; China
100 m backstroke	S8	Zhou Cong; China	Oliver Hynd; Great Britain	Robert Griswold; United States
100 m butterfly	S8	Song Maodang; China	Xu Haijiao; China	Yang Guanglong; China
100 m breaststroke	SB7	Carlos Serrano Zárate; Colombia	Blake Cochrane; Australia	Yang Hong; China
200 m individual medley	SM8	Oliver Hynd; Great Britain	Song Maodang; China	Xu Haijiao; China
50 m freestyle	S9	Matthew Wylie; Great Britain	Timothy Disken; Australia	Takuro Yamada; Japan
100 m freestyle	S9	Timothy Disken; Australia	Brenden Hall; Australia	Tamás Tóth; Hungary
400 m freestyle	S9	Brenden Hall; Australia	Federico Morlacchi; Italy	Lewis White; Great Britain
100 m backstroke	S9	Tamás Tóth; Hungary	Liu Xiaobing; China	Brenden Hall; Australia
100 m butterfly	S9	Dimosthenis Michalentzakis; Greece	Federico Morlacchi; Italy	Tamás Sors; Hungary
100 m breaststroke	SB8	Oscar Salguero Galisteo; Spain	Federico Morlacchi; Italy	Andreas Onea; Austria
200 m individual medley	SM9	Federico Morlacchi; Italy	Tamás Sors; Hungary	Timothy Disken; Australia
50 m freestyle	S10	Maksym Krypak; Ukraine	Phelipe Rodrigues; Brazil	Denys Dubrov; Ukraine
100 m freestyle	S10	Maksym Krypak; Ukraine	André Brasil; Brazil	Phelipe Rodrigues; Brazil
400 m freestyle	S10	Maksym Krypak; Ukraine	Denys Dubrov; Ukraine	Benoit Huot; Canada
100 m backstroke	S10	Maksym Krypak; Ukraine	Olivier van de Voort; Netherlands	Denys Dubrov; Ukraine
100 m butterfly	S10	Denys Dubrov; Ukraine	Maksym Krypak; Ukraine	Andre Brasil; Brazil
100 m breaststroke	SB9	Kevin Paul; South Africa	Denys Dubrov; Ukraine	Duncan van Haaren; Netherlands
200 m individual medley	SM10	Denys Dubrov; Ukraine	Maksym Krypak; Ukraine	Dmytro Vanzenko; Ukraine
50 m freestyle	S11	Brad Snyder; United States	Keiichi Kimura; Japan	Yang Bozun; China
100 m freestyle	S11	Brad Snyder; United States	Yang Bozun; China	Keiichi Kimura; Japan
400 m freestyle	S11	Brad Snyder; United States	Tharon Drake; United States	Matheus Souza; Brazil
100 m backstroke	S11	Dmytro ZalevskyI; Ukraine	Wojciech Makowski; Poland	shared silver
100 m backstroke	S11	Dmytro ZalevskyI; Ukraine	Brad Snyder; United States	shared silver
100 m butterfly	S11	Israel Oliver; Spain	Keiichi Kimura; Japan	Oleksandr Mashchenko; Ukraine
100 m breaststroke	SB11	Yang Bozun; China	Tharon Drake; United States	Keiichi Kimura; Japan
200 m individual medley	SM11	Israel Oliver; Spain	Viktor Smyrnov; Ukraine	Yang Bozun; China
50 m freestyle	S12	Maksym Veraksa; Ukraine	Dzmitry Salei; Azerbaijan	Illia Yaremenko; Ukraine
100 m backstroke	S12	Sergii Klippert; Ukraine	Raman Salei; Azerbaijan	Tucker Dupree; United States
100 m breaststroke	SB12	Uladzimir Izotau; Belarus	Dzmitry Salei; Azerbaijan	Maksym Veraksa; Ukraine
50 m freestyle	S13	Ihar Boki; Belarus	Carlos Farrenberg; Brazil	Muzaffar Tursunkhujaev; Uzbekistan
100 m freestyle	S13	Ihar Boki; Belarus	Iaroslav Denysenko; Ukraine	Maksym Veraksa; Ukraine
400 m freestyle	S13	Ihar Boki; Belarus	Iaroslav Denysenko; Ukraine	Dmitriy Horlin; Uzbekistan
100 m backstroke	S13	Ihar Boki; Belarus	Iaroslav Denysenko; Ukraine	Nicolas Guy Turbide; Canada
100 m butterfly	S13	Ihar Boki; Belarus	Kirill Pankov; Uzbekistan	Muzaffar Tursunkhujaev; Uzbekistan
100 m breaststroke	SB13	Oleksii Fedyna; Ukraine	shared gold	Ihar Boki; Belarus
100 m breaststroke	SB13	Firdavsbek Musabekov; Uzbekistan	shared gold	Ihar Boki; Belarus
200 m individual medley	SM13	Ihar Boki; Belarus	Iaroslav Denysenko; Ukraine	Danylo Chufarov; Ukraine
200 m freestyle	S14	Tang Wai-lok; Hong Kong	Thomas Hamer; Great Britain	Daniel Fox; Australia
100 m backstroke	S14	Lee In-kook; South Korea	Marc Evers; Netherlands	Takuya Tsugawa; Japan
100 m breaststroke	SB14	Aaron Moores; Great Britain	Scott Quin; Great Britain	Marc Evers; Netherlands
200 m individual medley	SM14	Marc Evers; Netherlands	Thomas Hamer; Great Britain	Keichi Nakajima; Japan
4 × 100 m freestyle relay	34 pts	Ukraine; Oleksandr Komarov; Maksym Krypak; Bohdan Hrynenko; Denys Dubrov	Brazil; Daniel Dias; André Brasil; Ruiter Silva; Phelipe Rodrigues	China; Song Maodang; Xu Haijiao; Lin Furong; Huang Yinan
4 × 100 m medley relay	34 pts	China; Zhou Cong; Lin Furong; Song Maodang; Wang Yinan	Ukraine; Iurii Bozhynskyi; Denys Dubrov; Maksym Krypak; Ievgenii Bogodaiko	Brazil; Daniel Dias; Ruan de Souza; André Brasil; Phelipe Rodrigues

=== Women's events ===
Event	Class	Gold	Silver	Bronze
50 m backstroke	S2	Yip Pin Xiu; Singapore	Feng Yazhu; China	Iryna Sotska; Ukraine
100 m backstroke	S2	Yip Pin Xiu; Singapore	Feng Yazhu; China	Iryna Sotska; Ukraine
100 m freestyle	S3	Zulfiya Gabidullina; Kazakhstan	Peng Qiuping; China	Olga Sviderska; Ukraine
50 m backstroke	S3	Peng Qiuping; China	Meng Guofen; China	Lisette Teunissen; Netherlands
50 m freestyle	S4	Rachael Watson; Australia	Arjola Trimi; Italy	Nely Miranda Herrera; Mexico
50 m backstroke	S4	Cheng Jiao; China	Deng Yue; China	Maryna Verbova; Ukraine
50 m breaststroke	SB3	Cheng Jiao; China	Mariia Lafina; Ukraine	Patricia Valle; Mexico
150 m individual medley	SM4	Cheng Jiao; China	Olga Sviderska; Ukraine	Deng Yue; China
50 m freestyle	S5	Zhang Li; China	Joana Neves; Brazil	Běla Hlaváčková; Czech Republic
100 m freestyle	S5	Zhang Li; China	Teresa Perales; Spain	Joana Neves; Brazil
200 m freestyle	S5	Zhang Li; China	Teresa Perales; Spain	Sarah Louise Rung; Norway
50 m backstroke	S5	Teresa Perales; Spain	Běla Hlaváčková; Czech Republic	Sarah Louise Rung; Norway
50 m butterfly	S5	Xu Xihan; China	Sarah Louise Rung; Norway	Giulia Ghiretti; Italy
100 m breaststroke	SB4	Sarah Louise Rung; Norway	Giulia Ghiretti; Italy	Theresa Goh; Singapore
200 m individual medley	SM5	Sarah Louise Rung; Norway	Teresa Perales; Spain	Inbal Pezaro; Israel
50 m freestyle	S6	Yelyzaveta Mereshko; Ukraine	Viktoriia Savtsova; Ukraine	Tiffany Thomas Kane; Australia
100 m freestyle	S6	Yelyzaveta Mereshko; Ukraine	Viktoriia Savtsova; Ukraine	Ellie Robinson; Great Britain
400 m freestyle	S6	Yelyzaveta Mereshko; Ukraine	Song Lingling; China	Eleanor Simmonds; Great Britain
100 m backstroke	S6	Song Lingling; China	Lu Dong; China	Oksana Khrul; Ukraine
50 m butterfly	S6	Ellie Robinson; Great Britain	Oksana Khrul; Ukraine	Tiffany Thomas Kane; Australia
100 m breaststroke	SB5	Yelyzaveta Mereshko; Ukraine	Viktoriia Savtsova; Ukraine	Song Lingling; China
200 m individual medley	SM6	Eleanor Simmonds; Great Britain	Song Lingling; China	Tiffany Thomas Kane; Australia
50 m freestyle	S7	McKenzie Coan; United States	Denise Grahl; Germany	Susannah Rodgers; Great Britain
100 m freestyle	S7	McKenzie Coan; United States	Cortney Jordan; United States	Huang Yajing; China
400 m freestyle	S7	McKenzie Coan; United States	Cortney Jordan; United States	Susannah Rodgers; Great Britain
100 m backstroke	S7	Ke Liting; China	Zhang Ying; China	Rebecca Dubber; New Zealand
50 m butterfly	S7	Susannah Rodgers; Great Britain	Cortney Jordan; United States	Nikita Howarth; New Zealand
100 m breaststroke	SB6	Tiffany Thomas Kane; Australia	Sophia Elizabeth Herzog; United States	Charlotte Henshaw; Great Britain
200 m individual medley	SM7	Nikita Howarth; New Zealand	Tess Routliffe; Canada	Cortney Jordan; United States
50 m freestyle	S8	Maddison Elliott; Australia	Lakeisha Patterson; Australia	Jiang Shengnan; China
100 m freestyle	S8	Maddison Elliott; Australia	Lakeisha Patterson; Australia	Stephanie Millward; Great Britain
400 m freestyle	S8	Lakeisha Patterson; Australia	Jessica Long; United States	Stephanie Millward; Great Britain
100 m backstroke	S8	Stephanie Millward; Great Britain	Maddison Elliott; Australia	Jessica Long; United States
100 m butterfly	S8	Kateryna Istomina; Ukraine	Stephanie Slater; Great Britain	Jessica Long; United States
100 m breaststroke	SB7	Elizabeth Marks; United States	Jessica Long; United States	Lisa den Braber; Netherlands
200 m individual medley	SM8	Jessica Long; United States	Stephanie Millward; Great Britain	Lakeisha Patterson; Australia
50 m freestyle	S9	Michelle Konkoly; United States	Ellie Cole; Australia	Wang Jiexin; China
100 m freestyle	S9	Michelle Konkoly; United States	Sarai Gascón; Spain	Ellie Cole; Australia
400 m freestyle	S9	Nuria Marqués; Spain	Ellie Cole; Australia	Xu Jialing; China
100 m backstroke	S9	Ellie Cole; Australia	Nuria Marqués; Spain	Hannah Aspden; United States
100 m butterfly	S9	Xu Jialing; China	Sarai Gascón; Spain	Zsofia Konkoly; Hungary
100 m breaststroke	SB8	Katarina Roxon; Canada	Claire Cashmore; Great Britain	Ellen Keane; Ireland
200 m individual medley	SM9	Lin Ping; China	Sarai Gascón; Spain	Amy Marren; Great Britain
50 m freestyle	S10	Aurélie Rivard; Canada	Sophie Pascoe; New Zealand	Chen Yi; China
100 m freestyle	S10	Aurélie Rivard; Canada	Sophie Pascoe; New Zealand	Élodie Lorandi; France
400 m freestyle	S10	Aurélie Rivard; Canada	Monique Murphy; Australia	Élodie Lorandi; France
100 m backstroke	S10	Sophie Pascoe; New Zealand	Bianka Pap; Hungary	Alice Tai; Great Britain
100 m butterfly	S10	Sophie Pascoe; New Zealand	Chen Yi; China	Oliwia Jabłońska; Poland
100 m breaststroke	SB9	Lisa Kruger; Netherlands	Harriet Lee; Great Britain	Chantalle Zijderveld; Netherlands
200 m individual medley	SM10	Sophie Pascoe; New Zealand	Aurélie Rivard; Canada	Bianka Pap; Hungary
50 m freestyle	S11	Li Guizhi; China	Maja Reichard; Sweden	Maryna Piddubna; Ukraine
50 m freestyle	S11	Li Guizhi; China	Maja Reichard; Sweden	Liesette Bruinsma; Netherlands
100 m freestyle	S11	Xie Qing; China	Li Guizhi; China	Liesette Bruinsma; Netherlands
400 m freestyle	S11	Liesette Bruinsma; Netherlands	Cecilia Camellini; Italy	Xie Qing; China
100 m backstroke	S11	Mary Fisher; New Zealand	Cai Liwen; China	Maja Reichard; Sweden
100 m breaststroke	SB11	Zhang Xiaotong; China	Liesette Bruinsma; Netherlands	Maja Reichard; Sweden
200 m individual medley	SM11	Liesette Bruinsma; Netherlands	Maja Reichard; Sweden	Xie Qing; China
50 m freestyle	S12	Hannah Russell; Great Britain	Naomi Maike Schnittger; Germany	Maria Delgado Nadal; Spain
100 m backstroke	S12	Hannah Russell; Great Britain	Yaryna Matlo; Ukraine	Maria Delgado Nadal; Spain
50 m freestyle	S13	Anna Stetsenko; Ukraine	Muslima Odilova; Uzbekistan	Shokhsanamkhon Toshpulatova; Uzbekistan
100 m freestyle	S13	Anna Stetsenko; Ukraine	Rebecca Meyers; United States	Hannah Russell; Great Britain
400 m freestyle	S13	Rebecca Meyers; United States	Anna Stetsenko; Ukraine	Ariadna Edo Beltrán; Spain
100 m backstroke	S13	Anna Stetsenko; Ukraine	Abby Kane; Great Britain	Katja Dedekind; Australia
100 m butterfly	S13	Rebecca Meyers; United States	Muslima Odilova; Uzbekistan	Fotimakhon Amilova; Uzbekistan
100 m breaststroke	SB13	Fotimakhon Amilova; Uzbekistan	Rebecca Redfern; Great Britain	Colleen Young; United States
200 m individual medley	SM13	Rebecca Meyers; United States	Fotimakhon Amilova; Uzbekistan	Shokhsanamkhon Toshpulatova; Uzbekistan
200 m freestyle	S14	Bethany Firth; Great Britain	Jessica-Jane Applegate; Great Britain	Marlou van der Kulk; Netherlands
100 m backstroke	S14	Bethany Firth; Great Britain	Marlou van der Kulk; Netherlands	Jessica-Jane Applegate; Great Britain
100 m breaststroke	SB14	Michelle Alonso Morales; Spain	Bethany Firth; Great Britain	Magda Toeters; Netherlands
200 m individual medley	SM14	Bethany Firth; Great Britain	Jessica-Jane Applegate; Great Britain	Marlou van der Kulk; Netherlands
4 × 100 m freestyle relay	34 pts	Australia; Ellie Cole; Lakeisha Patterson; Maddison Elliott; Ashleigh McConnell	United States; McKenzie Coan; Elizabeth Smith; Jessica Long; Michelle Konkoly	China; Song Lingling; Chen Yi; Lin Ping; Xu Jialing
4 × 100 m medley relay	34 pts	Great Britain; Alice Tai; Claire Cashmore; Stephanie Slater; Stephanie Millward	Australia; Ellie Cole; Madeleine Scott; Maddison Elliott; Lakeisha Patterson	United States; Hannah Aspden; Elizabeth Marks; Elizabeth Smith; Michelle Konkoly

=== Mixed events ===
Event	Class	Gold	Silver	Bronze
4 × 50 m freestyle relay	20 pts	China; Peng Qiuping; Jiang Shennang; Huang Wenpan; Xu Qing	Brazil; Clodoaldo Silva; Joana Neves; Susana Ribeiro; Daniel Dias	Ukraine; Andrii Derevinskyi; Viktoriia Savtsova; Olga Sviderska; Ievgenii Bogodaiko
