= Spain at the 2016 Summer Paralympics =

- IPC code: ESP
- NPC: Spanish Paralympic Committee
- Website: www.paralimpicos.es (in Spanish)

in Rio de Janeiro
- Competitors: 127 in 15 sports
- Flag bearer: José Manuel Ruiz (table tennis)
- Medals Ranked 11th: Gold 9 Silver 14 Bronze 8 Total 31

Summer Paralympics appearances (overview)
- 1968; 1972; 1976; 1980; 1984; 1988; 1992; 1996; 2000; 2004; 2008; 2012; 2016; 2020; 2024

Spain competed at the 2016 Summer Paralympics in Rio de Janeiro, Brazil, from 7 to 18 September 2016.

== Medalists ==
Medal	Name	Sport	Event
Gold	Elena Congost	Athletics	Women's marathon T11/12
Gold	Gerard Descarrega	Athletics	Men's 400 metres T11
Gold	Kim López	Athletics	Shot put F11/12
Gold	Oscar Salguero	Swimming	Men's 100 m breaststroke SB8
Gold	Michelle Alonso	Swimming	Women's 100 m breaststroke SB14
Gold	Israel Oliver	Swimming	Men's 100 m butterfly S11
Gold	Israel Oliver	Swimming	Men's 200 m medley SM11
Gold	Teresa Perales	Swimming	Women's 50 m backstroke S5
Gold	Nuria Marqués	Swimming	Women's 400 m freestyle S9
Silver	Abderrahman Ait Khamouch	Athletics	Men's marathon T46
Silver	Alberto Suárez	Athletics	Men's marathon T11/12
Silver	Ignacio Ávila	Cycling	Men's road race B
Silver	Álvaro Valera	Table tennis	Men's individual class 6
Silver	Jorge Cardona Juan Bautista Pérez José Manuel Ruiz	Table tennis	Men's team class 9–10
Silver	Miguel Luque	Swimming	Men's 50 m breaststroke SB3
Silver	Nuria Marqués	Swimming	Women's 100 m backstroke S9
Silver	Sarai Gascón	Swimming	Women's 100 m butterfly S9
Silver	Sarai Gascón	Swimming	Women's 50 m freestyle S9
Silver	Sarai Gascón	Swimming	Women's 200 m medley SM9
Silver	Teresa Perales	Swimming	Women's 100 m freestyle S5
Silver	Teresa Perales	Swimming	Women's 200 m freestyle S5
Silver	Teresa Perales	Swimming	Women's 200 metre individual medley SM5
Silver	Spain men's national wheelchair basketball team	Wheelchair basketball	Men's tournament
Bronze	David Casinos	Athletics	Discus throw F11
Bronze	Izaskun Oses	Athletics	Women's 1500 m T12/13
Bronze	Alfonso Cabello	Cycling	Men's 1000 m time trial C4–5
Bronze	Alfonso Cabello Amador Granados Eduardo Santas	Cycling	Mixed 750 m team sprint C1–5
Bronze	Jairo Ruiz	Triathlon	Men's PT4
Bronze	María Delgado	Swimming	Women's 100 m backstroke S12
Bronze	María Delgado	Swimming	Women's 50 m freestyle S12
Bronze	Ariadna Edo	Swimming	Women's 400 m freestyle S13

== Disability classifications ==
Every participant at the Paralympics has their disability grouped into one of five disability categories; amputation, the condition may be congenital or sustained through injury or illness; cerebral palsy; wheelchair athletes, there is often overlap between this and other categories; visual impairment, including blindness; Les autres, any physical disability that does not fall strictly under one of the other categories, for example dwarfism or multiple sclerosis. Each Paralympic sport then has its own classifications, dependent upon the specific physical demands of competition. Events are given a code, made of numbers and letters, describing the type of event and classification of the athletes competing. Some sports, such as athletics, divide athletes by both the category and severity of their disabilities, other sports, for example swimming, group competitors from different categories together, the only separation being based on the severity of the disability.

== Archery ==
Athlete	Event	Ranking round		Round of 32	Round of 16	Quarterfinals	Semifinals	Final / BM	
Athlete	Event	Score	Seed	Opposition Score	Opposition Score	Opposition Score	Opposition Score	Opposition Score	Rank
Manuel Sánchez Camús	Men's compound W1	537	14 Q	—N/a	Kinik (SVK); L 113–120	Did not advance			
Liliana Oliveros	Women's compound W1	540	6 Q	—N/a	Bye	Kim (KOR); L 113–124	Did not advance		
Guillermo Javier Rodríguez	Men's compound open	659	21 Q	Shelby (USA); L 131–143	Did not advance				
María Carmen Rubio	Women's compound open	600	16 Q	Tucker (USA); W 133–124	Zhou (CHN); L 136–144	Did not advance			
Manuel Sánchez Camús; Liliana Oliveros	Mixed team compound W1	1077	6 Q	—N/a		United States (USA); L 113–128	Did not advance		
Guillermo Javier Rodríguez; María Carmen Rubio	Mixed team compound open	1259	10 Q	—N/a	Canada (CAN); L 137–144	Did not advance			

== Athletics ==
Key

- Note–Ranks given for track events are within the athlete's heat only
- Q = Qualified for the next round
- q = Qualified for the next round as a fastest loser or, in field events, by position without achieving the qualifying target
- qr = Qualify repechaged for the next round because a race incident
- NR = National record
- N/A = Round not applicable for the event
- Bye = Athlete not required to compete in round

Men
Track & road events

Athlete	Event	Heat		Semifinal		Final	
Athlete	Event	Result	Rank	Result	Rank	Result	Rank
Joan Munar; Guide: Juan Enrique Vallés	200 m T12	22.88	1 Q	22.96	3	Did not advance	
Joan Munar; Guide: Juan Enrique Vallés	400 m T12	49.56	1 Q	50.12	2 q	50.08	4
Gerard Descarrega; Guide: Marcos Blanquiño	400 m T11	50.53	1 Q	—N/a		50.22	1st place, gold medalist(s)
Deliber Rodríguez	400 m T20	49.37	3 Q	—N/a		49.56	5
Dionibel Rodríguez	400 m T20	49.70	3 Q	—N/a		49.46	4
Santiago Sanz	1500 m T51/52	—N/a				3:55.90	6
Jordi Madera	5000 m T52/53/54	10:42.62	10	—N/a		Did not advance	
Jordi Madera	Marathon T52/53/54	—N/a				1:30:12	8
Gustavo Nieves	5000 m T12/13	—N/a				DNF	
Gustavo Nieves	Marathon T11/12	—N/a				DNF	
Abderrahman Ait Khamouch	Marathon T45/46	—N/a				2:37:01	2nd place, silver medalist(s)
Alberto Suárez	Marathon T11/12	—N/a				2:33:11	2nd place, silver medalist(s)
Gerard Descarrega; Guide: Marcos Blanquiño; Joan Munar; Guide: Juan Enrique Vallés; Martín Parejo; Guide: Enric Martín; Xavier Porras; Guide: Tim Stewart	4 × 100 m relay T11-13	DNF		—N/a		Did not advance	

Field events

Athlete	Event	Final	
Athlete	Event	Distance	Position
Martín Parejo	Long jump T11	5.39	10
Xavier Porras	Long jump T11	6.05	6
Héctor Cabrera	Shot put F11/12	13.75	12
Héctor Cabrera	Javelin throw F12/13	58.47	5
Kim López	Shot put F11/12	16.44	1st place, gold medalist(s)
David Casinos	Discus throw F11	38.58	3rd place, bronze medalist(s)

Women
Track & road events

Athlete	Event	Heat		Semifinal		Final	
Athlete	Event	Result	Rank	Result	Rank	Result	Rank
Sara Andrés	100 m T43/44	14.06	6	—N/a		Did not advance	
Sara Andrés	200 m T43/44	28.80	4	—N/a		Did not advance	
Sara Andrés	400 m T43/44	—N/a				1:05.64	5
Lia Beel Quintana; Guide: David Alonso Gutiérrez	100 m T11	13.99	4	Did not advance			
Lia Beel Quintana; Guide: David Alonso Gutiérrez	200 m T11	29.65	4	Did not advance			
Sara Fernández	100 m T12	13.96	3	Did not advance			
Sara Martínez	100 m T12	14.59	2	Did not advance			
Melani Berges; Guide: Sergio Sánchez	400 m T12	57.52	1 Q	—N/a		57.66	4
Izaskun Oses	400 m T12	59.80	3	—N/a		Did not advance	
Izaskun Oses	1500 m T12/13	4:49.99	1 Q	—N/a		4:39.99	3rd place, bronze medalist(s)
Elena Congost; Guide: Roger Esteve	1500 m T12/13	5:11.68	4	—N/a		Did not advance	
Elena Congost; Guide: Roger Esteve	Marathon T11/12	—N/a				3:01.43 PR	1st place, gold medalist(s)
Mari Carmen Paredes; Guide: Lorenzo Sánchez	1500 m T12/13	5:19.03	5	—N/a		Did not advance	
Mari Carmen Paredes; Guide: Lorenzo Sánchez	Marathon T11/12	—N/a				DNF	
Lia Beel Quintana; Guide: David Alonso Gutiérrez; Melani Berges; Guide: Sergio Sánchez; Sara Martínez; Izaskun Oses	4 × 100 m relay T11-13	—N/a				52.40	4

Field events

Athlete	Event	Final	
Athlete	Event	Distance	Position
Sara Fernández	Long jump T12	4.47	8
Sara Martínez	Long jump T12	5.52	4

== Boccia ==
The Spain national boccia team qualified to the BC1/BC2 mixed team tournament (and for the individual tournament in both categories) because their third position in the BISFED 2015 Boccia World Team Rankings.

Athlete	Event	Groups phase		Quarterfinals	Semifinals	Final / BM	
Athlete	Event	Score	Rank	Opposition Score	Opposition Score	Opposition Score	Rank
José Manuel Prado	Mixed individual BC1	Soulanis (GRE) L 1–6; Leung (HKG) W 6–0; Ibarbure (ARG) L 0–8	4	Did not advance			
Manuel Martín	Mixed individual BC2	Vongsa (THA) L 2–12; Murray (GBR) W 8–2	2	Did not advance			
José Manuel Prado; Manuel Martín	Mixed team BC1–2	Hong Kong (HKG) L 3–6; Brazil (BRA) L 1–8	3	Did not advance			

== Cycling ==
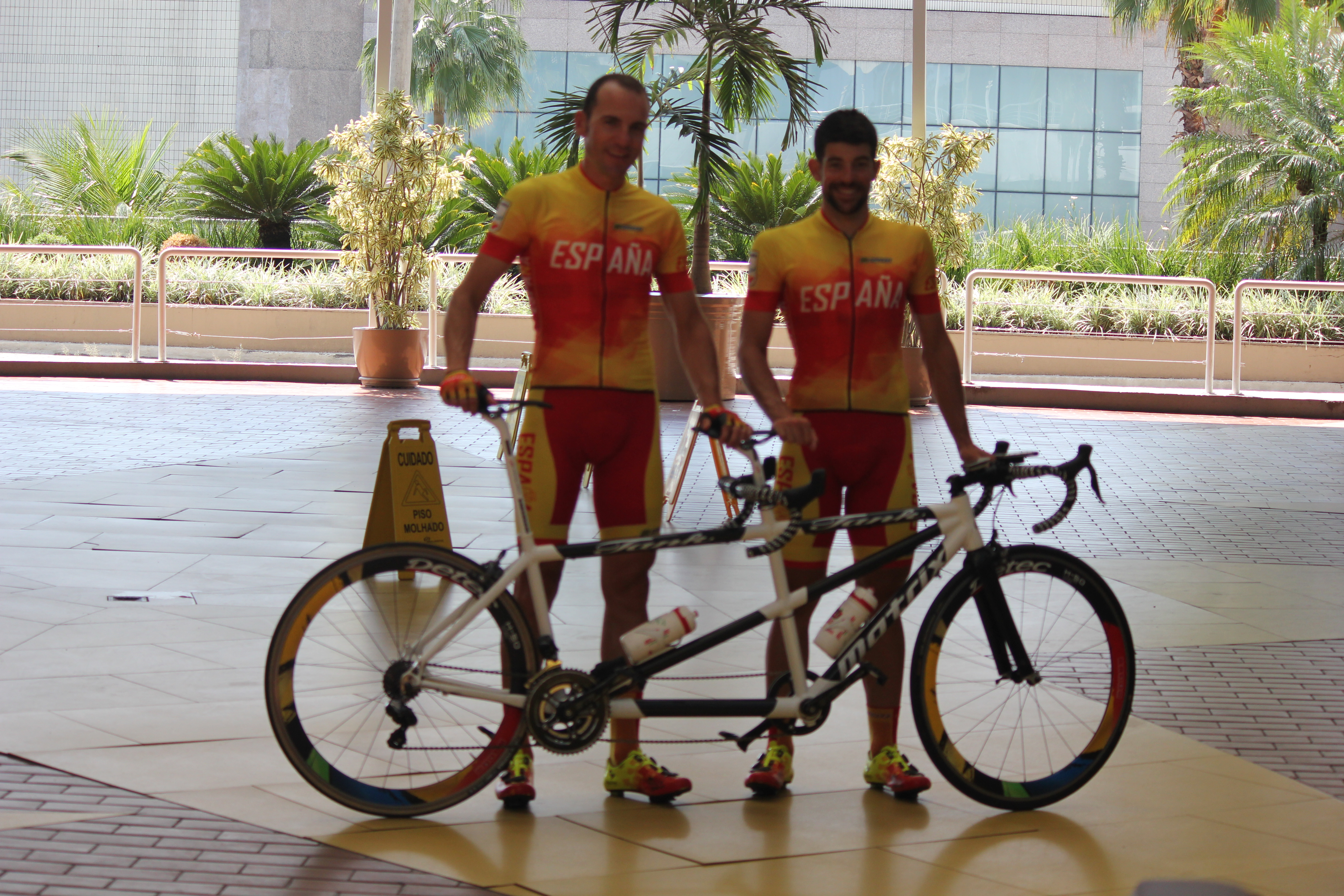
Ignacio Avila Rodriguez and his guide in Rio.

With one pathway for qualification being one highest ranked NPCs on the UCI Para-Cycling male and female Nations Ranking Lists on 31 December 2014, Spain qualified for the 2016 Summer Paralympics in Rio, assuming they continued to meet all other eligibility requirements.

=== Road ===
Athlete	Event	Time	Rank
Ignacio Ávila; Pilot: Joan Font	Men's road race B	2:26:33	2nd place, silver medalist(s)
Ignacio Ávila; Pilot: Joan Font	Men's time trial B	36:45.05	10
Josefa Benítez; Pilot: Beatriu Gómez	Women's road race B	2:06:21	8
Josefa Benítez; Pilot: Beatriu Gómez	Women's time trial B	42:32.37	10
Alfonso Cabello	Men's road race C4–5	DNF	
Maurice Eckhard	Men's road race C1–2–3	1:14:50	16
Maurice Eckhard	Men's time trial C2	28:22.17	4
Carlos González; Pilot: Noèl Martin	Men's road race B	2:27:05	4
Carlos González; Pilot: Noèl Martin	Men's time trial B	36:35.43	8
Amador Granados	Men's road race C3	DNF	
Juan José Méndez	Men's road race C1–2–3	1:17:09	23
Juan José Méndez	Men's time trial C1	30:05.23	7
César Neira	Men's road race C4–5	DNF	
César Neira	Men's time trial C4	40:18.26	8
Eduardo Santas	Men's road race C3	1:13:03	7

=== Track ===
Athlete	Event	Qualification		Final	
Athlete	Event	Time	Rank	Opposition Time	Rank
Ignacio Ávila; Pilot: Joan Font	Men's 1000 m team trial B	—N/a		1:03.533	7
Ignacio Ávila; Pilot: Joan Font	Men's 4000 m individual pursuit B	4:13.536	3 Q	4:16.674	4
Josefa Benítez; Pilot: Beatriu Gómez	Women's 1000 m team trial B	—N/a		1:15.382	12
Josefa Benítez; Pilot: Beatriu Gómez	Women's 3000 m individual pursuit B	3:46.984	11	Did not advance	
Alfonso Cabello	Men's 1000 m time trial C4–5	—N/a		1:04.494 PR	3rd place, bronze medalist(s)
Maurice Eckhard	Men's 3000 m individual pursuit C2	3:57.786	7	Did not advance	
Carlos González; Pilot: Noèl Martin	Men's 4000 m individual pursuit B	4:19.752	7	Did not advance	
Amador Granados	Men's 1000 m time trial C1–2–3	—N/a		1:18.378	22
Juan José Méndez	Men's 1000 m time trial C1–2–3	—N/a		1:22.236	24
Juan José Méndez	Men's 3000 m individual pursuit C1	4:19.161	9	Did not advance	
César Neira	Men's 4000 m individual pursuit C4	—N/a		5:01.045	9
Eduardo Santas	Men's 1000 m time trial C1–2–3	—N/a		1:12.276	7
Eduardo Santas	Men's 3000 m individual pursuit C3	3:45.398	6	Did not advance	
Alfonso Cabello; Amador Granados; Eduardo Santas	Mixed 750 m team sprint C1–5	51.011	3 Q	50.664	3rd place, bronze medalist(s)

†The Men's 1000 metres C4-5 time trial is an event with cyclist of class C4 and C5. Alfonso Cabello made the C5 Paralympic Record.

== Football 5-a-side ==
The Spain men's national Football 5-a-side team qualified to the tournament after the Russian team was banned, and because of their third position (behind Russia) in the 2015 IBSA Football 5-a-side European Championships.

The following is the Spain squad in the football 5-a-side tournament of the 2016 Summer Paralympics.

No.	Pos.	Player	Class	Date of birth (age)
1	GK	Pedro Gutiérrez	Sighted	25 January 1986 (aged 30)
3	FW	José Luis Giera Tejuelo	B1	28 July 1985 (aged 31)
4	DF	Iván López	B1	10 November 1992 (aged 23)
5	DF	Carmelo Garrido Alarcón	B1	12 September 1971 (aged 44)
6	DF	Adolfo Samuel Acosta Rodríguez	B1	19 May 1981 (aged 35)
8	DF	Francisco Javier Muñoz Perez	B1	12 December 1985 (aged 30)
9	FW	Sergio Alamar	B1	20 October 2000 (aged 15)
10	FW	Youssef El Haddaqui Rabil	B1	28 December 1988 (aged 27)
11	FW	Marcelo Rosado Carrasco	B1	2 October 1978 (aged 37)
12	GK	Sergio Rodríguez	Sighted	11 July 1987 (aged 29)

Pos	Team	Pld	W	D	L	GF	GA	GD	Pts	Qualification
1	Argentina	3	2	1	0	3	0	+3	7	Semi finals
2	China	3	2	1	0	3	0	+3	7	Semi finals
3	Spain	3	1	0	2	1	2	−1	3	5th–6th place match
4	Mexico	3	0	0	3	0	5	−5	0	7th–8th place match

Source: Paralympic.org
9 September 2016
11:00

Spain	0–1	China
	Report	Wang Z. 43'

Olympic Tennis Centre, Rio de Janeiro
Attendance: 2,569
Referee: Germi Guimaraes (Brazil)

11 September 2016
11:00

Argentina	1–0	Spain
Véliz 29'	Report

Olympic Tennis Centre, Rio de Janeiro
Attendance: 2,374
Referee: Lucio Morgado (Brazil)

13 September 2016
20:00

Mexico	0–1	Spain
	Report	Acosta 14'

Olympic Tennis Centre, Rio de Janeiro
Attendance: 3,080
Referee: Rafael Glock (Brazil)

5th–6th place match

15 September 2016
11:00

Turkey	0–0	Spain
	Report
Penalties
Sümer (penalty scored); Şatay (penalty missed); Öcal (penalty missed)	1–0	(penalty missed) El Haddaqui; (penalty missed) Muñoz; (penalty missed) Garrido

Olympic Tennis Centre, Rio de Janeiro
Attendance: 971
Referee: Stuart Winton (Great Britain)

== Judo ==
Athlete	Event	Preliminaries	Quarterfinals	Semifinals	Repechage	Final / BM	
Athlete	Event	Opposition Result	Opposition Result	Opposition Result	Opposition Result	Opposition Result	Rank
Mónica Merenciano	Women's 57 kg	Bye	Seo (KOR); L 000–110	Did not advance	Buranyi (HUN); W 101–000	Hirose (JPN); L 000–101	5
Luis Daniel Gavilán	Men's 66 kg	Fujimoto (JPN); L 000–100	Did not advance		Jongseok (KOR); L 000–100	Did not advance	
Álvaro Gavilán	Men's 73 kg	Meskine (ALG); L 000–002	Did not advance				
Abel Vázquez	Men's 90 kg	Cavalcante (BRA); L 000–101	Did not advance				

== Paracanoeing ==
Spain qualified one boat in men's KL2 in the 2016 ICF Canoe Sprint World Championships.

Athlete	Event	Heats		Semifinal		Final	
Athlete	Event	Score	Rank	Score	Rank	Score	Rank
Javier Reja	Men's KL2	52.325	5 Q	52.389	6	Did not advance	

== Powerlifting ==
Athlete	Event	Attempts			Result	Rank
Athlete	Event	1	2	3	Result	Rank
Loida Zabala	Women's 50 kg	95	~~101~~	~~193~~	95	5

== Sailing ==
One pathway for qualifying for Rio involved having a boat have top seven finish at the 2015 Combined World Championships in a medal event where the country had nor already qualified through via the 2014 IFDS Sailing World Championships. Spain qualified for the 2016 Games under this criterion in the Sonar event with a thirteenth-place finish overall and the fifth country who had not qualified via the 2014 Championships. The boat was crewed by Francisco Llobet, Hector Garcia, and Manuel Gimeno. They qualified a second boat in the SKUD 18 event with a thirteenth-place finish overall and the fifth country who had not qualified via the 2014 Championships. The boat was crewed by Sergio Roig and Violeta Del Reino. Spain qualified a third boat in the 2.4m event with a seventeenth-place finish overall and the seventh country who had not qualified via the 2014 Championships. The boat was crewed by Antonio Maestre. He tied with fellow Spaniard Montes Vorcy Arturo for seventeenth place but won on the tiebreaker.

Athlete	Event	Race											Total points	Net points	Rank
Athlete	Event	1	2	3	4	5	6	7	8	9	10	11	Total points	Net points	Rank
Arturo Montes	2.4 mR	11	12	10	3	8	11	~~13~~	10	10	9	4	101	88	9
Violeta Del Reino; Sergey Roig	SKUD 18	9	~~10~~	9	9	8	5	10	8	8	7	6	89	79	9
Hector Garcia; Manuel Gimeno; Francisco Llobet	Sonar	9	7	13	~~15~~	10	14	9	13	13	14	12	129	114	14

== Shooting ==
The country sent shooters to 2015 IPC IPC Shooting World Cup in Osijek, Croatia, where Rio direct qualification was available. They earned a qualifying spot at this event based on the performance of Juan Antonio Saavedra in the R6 – 50m Rifle Prone Mixed SH1 event.

Athlete	Event	Qualification		Final	
Athlete	Event	Score	Rank	Score	Rank
Juan Antonio Saavedra	Mixed R6 50m rifle prone SH1	613.9	12	Did not advance	

== Swimming ==
The top two finishers in each Rio medal event at the 2015 IPC Swimming World Championships earned a qualifying spot for their country for Rio. Teresa Perales earned Spain a spot after winning gold in the Women's 50m Backstroke S5.

Men's

Athlete	Event	Qualification		Final	
Athlete	Event	Time	Rank	Time	Rank
Vicente Gil Ros	50 m breaststroke SB3	53.07	4th Q	56.56	8th
David Levecq	50 m freestyle S10	25.08	3rd	Did not advance	
David Levecq	100 m freestyle S10	55.25	3rd	Did not advance	
David Levecq	100 m butterfly S10	58.95	2nd Q	59.03	6th
Íñigo Llopis	50 m freestyle S8	28.74	7th	Did not advance	
Íñigo Llopis	100 m freestyle S8	1:01.96	4th	Did not advance	
Íñigo Llopis	200 m medley SM8	2:41.33	6th	Did not advance	
Miguel Luque	50 m breaststroke SB3	49.79	2nd Q	49.47	2nd place, silver medalist(s)
Miguel Luque	150 m medley SM4	2:47.33	4th Q	2:45.34	6th
Jose Antonio Mari	50 m freestyle S9	26.15	2nd Q	26.11	5th
Jose Antonio Mari	100 m freestyle S9	57.17	2nd Q	57.62	7th
Jose Antonio Mari	400 m freestyle S9	4:22.89	4th Q	4:23.04	4th
Jose Antonio Mari	100 m butterfly S9	1:04.39	4th	Did not advance	
Miguel Angel Martinez Tajuelo	50 m freestyle S3	51.09	4th Q	50.90	6th
Miguel Angel Martinez Tajuelo	200 m freestyle S3	—N/a		3:45.19	6th
Miguel Angel Martinez Tajuelo	50 m backstroke S3	51.69	2nd Q	52.87	6th
Israel Oliver	400 m freestyle S11	—N/a		4:43.17	5th
Israel Oliver	100 m butterfly S11	—N/a		1:02.24	1st place, gold medalist(s)
Israel Oliver	200 m medley SM11	2:27.67	1st Q	2:24.11	1st place, gold medalist(s)
Antoni Ponce	400 m freestyle S7	5:09.31	4th Q	5:09.43	7th
Antoni Ponce	100 m backstroke S7			Did not advance	
Antoni Ponce	100 m backstroke S7	1:30.49	5th Q	1:30.33	7th
Antoni Ponce	200 me medley SM7	2:56.60	5th	Did not advance	
Sebastian Rodriguez	50 m freestyle S5	34.96	2 Q	34.62	4th
Sebastian Rodriguez	100 m freestyle S5	1:18.12	2nd Q	1:17.10	4th
Sebastian Rodriguez	200 m freestyle S5	2:55.36	5th Q	2:50.53	5th
Oscar Salguero Galisteo	100 m breaststroke SB8	—N/a		1:11.11	1st place, gold medalist(s)
Oscar Salguero Galisteo	200 m medley SM9	2:27.07	6th	Did not advance	
Iván Salguero Oteiza	50 m freestyle S13	25.72	4th	Did not advance	
Iván Salguero Oteiza	100 m freestyle S13	56.29	5th	Did not advance	
Iván Salguero Oteiza	100 m freestyle S13	4:25.10	6th	Did not advance	
Iván Salguero Oteiza	100 m breaststroke SB13	1:13.08	4th Q	1:13.95	8th
Iván Salguero Oteiza	200 m medley SM13	2:23.05	5th	Did not advance	
Ricardo Ten	100 m breaststroke SB4	—N/a		1:38.07	5th

Women's

Athlete	Event	Qualification		Final	
Athlete	Event	Time	Rank	Time	Rank
Michelle Alonso Morales	200 m freestyle S14	1:19.05	4th	Did not advance	
Michelle Alonso Morales	100 m backstroke S14	2:17.42	3rd Q	2:16.65	5th
Michelle Alonso Morales	100 m breaststroke SB14	1:13.05	1st Q	1:12.62	1st place, gold medalist(s)
Michelle Alonso Morales	200 m medley SM14	2:39.62	4th Q	2:44.87	8th
María Delgado Nadal	50 m freestyle S12	29.45	4th	29.03	3rd place, bronze medalist(s)
María Delgado Nadal	400 m freestyle S13	4:52.71	4th	Did not advance	
María Delgado Nadal	100 m backstroke S12	—N/a		1:12.73	3rd place, bronze medalist(s)
María Delgado Nadal	100 m butterfly S13	1:08.44	3rd Q	1:08.76	8th
Ariadna Edo	50 m freestyle S13	29.29	5th	Did not advance	
Ariadna Edo	100 m freestyle S13	1:03.92	6th	Did not advance	
Ariadna Edo	400 m freestyle S13	4:46.78	2nd Q	4:43.49	3rd place, bronze medalist(s)
Ariadna Edo	100 m backstroke S13	1:16.03	5th	Did not advance	
Ariadna Edo	100 m butterfly S13	1:10.44	3rd	Did not advance	
Ariadna Edo	200 m medley SM13	2:38.29	2nd Q	2:36.45	6th
Sarai Gascón	50 m freestyle S9	29.61	2nd Q	29.39	5th
Sarai Gascón	50 m freestyle S9	1:03.36	1st Q	1:02.81	2nd place, silver medalist(s)
Sarai Gascón	100 m butterfly S9	1:10.59	2nd Q	1:08.00	2nd place, silver medalist(s)
Sarai Gascón	200 m medley SM9	2:37.71	1st Q	2:35.84	2nd place, silver medalist(s)
Marta Gómez	50 m freestyle S13	30.61	6th	Did not advance	
Marta Gómez	100 m freestyle S13	1:06.85	7th	Did not advance	
Marta Gómez	400 m freestyle S13	4:52.36	5th Q	4:54.14	8th
Marta Gómez	200 m medley SM13	2:45.84	4th	Did not advance	
Isabel Yinghua Hernandez	50 m freestyle S10	30.00	3rd	Did not advance	
Isabel Yinghua Hernandez	100 m freestyle S10	1:05.03	5th	Did not advance	
Isabel Yinghua Hernandez	100 m backstroke S10	1:15.95	7th	Did not advance	
Isabel Yinghua Hernandez	100 m butterfly S10	1:09.39	3rd Q	1:09.23	4th
Nuria Marqués	50 m freestyle S9	30.10	4th Q	29.80	8th
Nuria Marqués	100 m freestyle S9	1:03.82	2nd Q	1:03.94	4th
Nuria Marqués	400 m freestyle S9	4:54.98	2nd Q	4:42.56	1st place, gold medalist(s)
Nuria Marqués	100 m backstroke S9	1:11.22	1st Q	41:09.57	2nd place, silver medalist(s)
Nuria Marqués	100 m butterfly S9	1:11.28	3rd	Did not advance	
Nuria Marqués	200 m medley SM9	2:38.85	3rd Q	2:37.30	5th
Teresa Perales	50 m freestyle S5	37.87	1st Q	38.13	4th
Teresa Perales	100 m freestyle S5	1:24.37	1st Q	1:20.47	2nd place, silver medalist(s)
Teresa Perales	200 m freestyle S5	2:56.53	3rd Q	2:50.91	2nd place, silver medalist(s)
Teresa Perales	200 m medley SM5	3:40.65	2nd Q	3:36.14	2nd place, silver medalist(s)
Teresa Perales	50 m backstroke S5	44.48	1st Q	43.03	1st place, gold medalist(s)
Teresa Perales	50 m butterfly S5	47.73	1st Q	47.36	5th
Marian Polo	50 m freestyle S13	29.41	5th	Did not advance	
Marian Polo	100 m freestyle S13	1:05.37	5th	Did not advance	
Marian Polo	100 m backstroke S13	1:16.41	5th	Did not advance	
Marian Polo	100 m breaststroke SB13	1:24.67	6th	Did not advance	
Marian Polo	100 m butterfly S13	1:20.09	6th	Did not advance	
Marian Polo	200 m medley SM13	2:45.84	4th	Did not advance	
Judit Rolo	50 m freestyle S7	2:41.19	4th	Did not advance	
Judit Rolo	50 m butterfly S7	37.96	3rd Q	37.78	5th
Judit Rolo	200 m medley SM7	3:41.89	4th Q	3:39.68	7th

== Table tennis ==
Athlete	Event	Group		First round	Quarterfinals	Semifinals	Final / BM	
Athlete	Event	Opposition Result	Position	Opposition Result	Opposition Result	Opposition Result	Opposition Result	Rank
Miguel Rodríguez	Men's individual class 3	Merren (FRA) L 0–3; Nalepka (POL) L 2–3	3	Did not advance				
Bilal El Baqqali	Men's individual class 5	Cao (CHN) L 1-3; Kim (KOR) L 0-3	3	Did not advance				
Bilal El Baqqali; Miguel Rodríguez	Men's team class 4–5	—N/a		Egypt (EGY); L 1-2	Did not advance			
Alberto Seoane	Men's individual class 6	Rosenmeier (DEN) L 3-1; Alecci (ITA) W 3–2	2 Q	Bye	Thainiyom (THA); L 2–3	Did not advance		
Álvaro Valera	Men's individual class 6	Dettoni (CHI) W 3-0; Simion (ROU) W 3-0	1 Q	Bye	Wetherill (GBR); W 3–2	Thainiyom (THA); W 3–1	Rosenmeier (DEN); L 2–3	2nd place, silver medalist(s)
Jordi Morales	Men's individual class 7	Popov (UKR) W 3–1; Horut (CZE) W 3–1	1 Q	Bye	Messi (FRA); W 3–1	Bayley (GBR); L 1–3	Yan (CHN); L 1–3	4
Jordi Morales; Alberto Seoane; Álvaro Valera	Men's team class 6–8	—N/a		Brazil (BRA); W 2–1	Great Britain (GBR); L 1–2	Did not advance		
Juan Bautista Pérez	Men's individual class 9	Thompson (GBR) L 0–3; Fraczyk (AUT) L 2–3	2 Q	Bye	Zhao (CHN); W 3–2	Devos (BEL); L 0–3	Kalem (ITA); L 0–3	4
Jorge Cardona	Men's individual class 10	Chojnowski (POL) L 3–0; Karabec (CZE) W 3–0	2 Q	Bye	Ge (CHN); L 0–3	Did not advance		
José Manuel Ruiz	Men's individual class 10	Carbinatti (BRA) W 3–0; Gardos (AUT) L 1–3	2 Q	Hao (CHN); L 1–3	Did not advance			
Jorge Cardona; Juan Bautista Pérez; José Manuel Ruiz	Men's team class 9–10	—N/a		Bye	Czech Republic (CZE); W 2–1	Poland (POL); W 2–1	China (CHN); L 1–2	2nd place, silver medalist(s)
Eduardo Cuesta	Men's individual class 11	Kim (KOR) L 3-0; Navrotskyi (UKR) W 3-2	3	Did not advance				

== Triathlon ==
Athlete	Event	Swim (750 m)	Trans 1	Bike (20 km)	Trans 2	Run (5 km)	Total Time	Rank
Lionel Morales	Men's PT2	12:08	2:16	38:21	1:04	22:54	1:16:43	7
Rakel Mateo	Women's PT2	13:28	2:43	48:40	1:18	34:24	1:40:33	8
Jairo Ruiz	Men's PT4	11:06	1:14	33:11	0:41	17:02	1:03:14	3rd place, bronze medalist(s)
Susana Rodríguez; Pilot: Mabel Gallardo	Women's PT5	16:20	1:21	34:59	0:53	21:56	1:15:29	5

== Wheelchair basketball ==
The Spain men's national wheelchair basketball team has qualified for the 2016 Rio Paralympics. During the draw, Brazil had the choice of which group they wanted to be in. They were partnered with Spain, who would be in the group Brazil did not select. Brazil chose Group B, which included Iran, the United States, Great Britain, Germany and Algeria. That left Spain in Group A with Australia, Canada, Turkey, the Netherlands and Japan.

Pos	Team	Pld	W	L	PF	PA	PD	Pts	Qualification
1	Spain	5	4	1	341	265	+76	9 (Note: Head-to-head record: Spain 3 pts, +8 PD; Turkey 3 pts, +1 PD; Japan 3 pts, −9 PD)	Quarter-finals
2	Turkey	5	4	1	327	272	+55	9	Quarter-finals
3	Australia	5	4	1	342	293	+49	9	Quarter-finals
4	Netherlands	5	2	3	264	294	−30	7	Quarter-finals
5	Japan	5	1	4	278	300	−22	6	9th/10th place playoff
6	Canada	5	0	5	222	350	−128	5	11th/12th place playoff

Source: Paralympic.org
Rules for classification: 1) Points; 2) Head-to-head results; 3) Points difference; 4) Points scored.
Notes:

8 September 2016
21:30

Report

Spain	80–46	Canada
Scoring by quarter: 20–11, 23–9, 22–14, 15–12
Pts: A. Zarzuela 22; Rebs: A. Zarzuela 10; Asts: García 7		Pts: Eng 12; Rebs: Hickey 4 Asts: Goncin 5

Carioca Arena 1, Rio de Janeiro
Referees: Carsten Rehling

9 September 2016
15:45

Report

Japan	39–55	Spain
Scoring by quarter: 11–8, 12–18, 4–16, 12–13
Pts: Kozai 11; Rebs: Fujimoto, Chiwaki 11; Asts: Kozai 8		Pts: Mouriz 20; Rebs: A. Zarzuela 10; Asts: Alejos 4

Carioca Arena 1, Rio de Janeiro
Referees: Bill Kuerzi

10 September 2016
10:30

Report

Spain	65–68	Turkey
Scoring by quarter: 20–21, 16–13, 14–15, 15–19
Pts: A. Zarzuela, P. Zarzuela 18; Rebs: A. Zarzuela 11; Asts: García 14		Pts: Gürbulak 39; Rebs: Gezinci, Gümüş 6 Asts: Gürbulak 8

Carioca Arena 1, Rio de Janeiro
Referees: Max Kindervater

11 September 2016
08:30

Report

Spain	75–64	Australia
Scoring by quarter: 11–21, 24–12, 16–10, 24–21
Pts: A. Zarzuela, P. Zarzuela 17; Rebs: A. Zarzuela 13; Asts: García 11		Pts: Knowles 28; Rebs: Knowles 11; Asts: Norris 6

Rio Olympic Arena, Rio de Janeiro
Referees: Cristian Roja

12 September 2016
17:15

Report

Netherlands	48–66	Spain
Scoring by quarter: 12–24, 9–23, 9–8, 18–11
Pts: Korkmaz 13; Rebs: Poggenwisch 8 Asts: Poggenwisch 4		Pts: A. Zarzuela 19; Rebs: three players 7 Asts: García 10

Rio Olympic Arena, Rio de Janeiro
Referees: Carsten Rehling

Quarter-finals

14 September 2016
11:45

Report

Spain	70–66	Germany
Scoring by quarter: 19–21, 15–19, 14–13, 22–13
Pts: A. Zarzuela, García 22; Rebs: A. Zarzuela 18; Asts: García 13		Pts: Halouski 21; Rebs: Halouski 15; Asts: Bienek 8

Rio Olympic Arena, Rio de Janeiro
Referees: Bill Kuerzi

Semifinals

15 September 2016
17:30

Report

Spain	69–63	Great Britain
Scoring by quarter: 12–14, 23–14, 12–15, 20–20
Pts: García, A. Zarzuela 19; Rebs: García 13; Asts: García 13		Pts: Sagar 18; Rebs: Choudrhy 8 Asts: Pratt 8

Rio Olympic Arena, Rio de Janeiro
Referees: Sebastien Gauthier

Final

17 September 2016
17:30

Report

Spain	52–68	United States
Scoring by quarter: 8-12, 15-17, 19-18, 10-21
Pts: A. Zarzuela 20; Rebs: García 10; Asts: García 16		Pts: Williams 20; Rebs: Serio 8 Asts: Serio 10

Rio Olympic Arena, Rio de Janeiro
Referees: Mat Wells

== Wheelchair tennis ==
Lola Ochoa qualified for Rio in the women's singles event via a Bipartite Commission Invitation place. Daniel Caverzaschi, Martin De La Puente and Francesc Tur qualified in the men's singles event via the standard qualification process.

Athlete	Event	Round of 64	Round of 32	Round of 16	Quarterfinals	Semifinals	Final / BM	
Athlete	Event	Opposition Result	Opposition Result	Opposition Result	Opposition Result	Opposition Result	Opposition Result	Rank
Daniel Caverzaschi	Men's singles	Wei (CHN); W 2–6, 6–1, 6-3	Baldwin (USA); W 6–0, 6-3	Houdet (FRA); L 0–6, 1–6	Did not advance			
Martín de la Puente	Men's singles	Santos (BRA); W 6–1, 6-4	Fernández (ARG); L 2–6, 4–6	Did not advance				
Francesc Tur	Men's singles	Weekes (AUS); L 5–7, 3–6	Did not advance					
Lola Ochoa	Women's singles	Bye	Krüger (GER); L 1–6, 1–6	Did not advance				
Daniel Caverzaschi; Martín de la Puente	Men's doubles	—N/a	Bye	Denayer / Gérard (BEL); W 7–5, 6–7^{(4–7)}, 6–2	Hewett / Reid (GBR); L 2–6, 0–6	Did not advance		

== See also ==
- Spain at the 2016 Summer Olympics
