= Swimming at the 2016 Summer Paralympics – Women's 50 metre freestyle S9 =

Women's 50 metre freestyle S9 at the XV Paralympic Games
- Venue: Olympic Aquatics Stadium
- Dates: 12 September 2016
- Competitors: 22 from 18 nations

Medalists
1st place, gold medalist(s)		Michelle Konkoly	United States
2nd place, silver medalist(s)		Ellie Cole	Australia
3rd place, bronze medalist(s)		Jiexin Wang	China

The women's 50 metre freestyle S9 event at the 2016 Paralympic Games took place on 12 September 2016, at the Olympic Aquatics Stadium. Three heats were held. The swimmers with the eight fastest times advanced to the final.

== Heats ==
=== Heat 1 ===
11:33 13 September 2016:

Rank	Lane	Name	Nationality	Time	Notes
1	5	Jiexin Wang	China	29.55	Q
2	4	Sarai Gascon	Spain	29.61	Q
3	6	Elizabeth Smith	United States	30.18	
4	3	Daniela Gimenez	Argentina	30.24	
5	2	Tupou Neiufi	New Zealand	31.37	
6	7	Francesca Secci	Italy	31.94	
7	1	Shanntol Ince	Trinidad and Tobago	33.38	

=== Heat 2 ===
11:36 13 September 2016:

Rank	Lane	Name	Nationality	Time	Notes
1	4	Ellie Cole	Australia	29.26	Q
2	5	Emily Beecroft	Australia	29.61	Q
3	3	Hannah Aspden	United States	30.57	
4	6	Amy Marren	Great Britain	30.80	
5	7	Zsofia Konkoly	Hungary	31.67	
6	2	Camille Cruz	Brazil	31.68	
7	1	Yuki Morishita	Japan	32.03	

=== Heat 3 ===
11:38 13 September 2016:

Rank	Lane	Name	Nationality	Time	Notes
1	4	Michelle Konkoly	United States	28.36	PR Q
2	6	Ping Lin	China	29.26	Q
3	5	Ashleigh McConnell	Australia	29.61	Q
4	3	Nuria Marques Soto	Spain	30.10	Q
5	2	Anchaya Ketkeaw	Thailand	31.01	
6	7	Mei Ichinose	Japan	31.22	
7	1	Emily Gray	South Africa	33.25	
8	8	Paola Alexandra Acuna Sanchez	Puerto Rico	33.91	

== Final ==
19:55 13 September 2016:

Rank	Lane	Name	Nationality	Time	Notes
1st place, gold medalist(s)	4	Michelle Konkoly	United States	28.29	PR
2nd place, silver medalist(s)	5	Ellie Cole	Australia	29.13	
3rd place, bronze medalist(s)	6	Jiexin Wang	China	29.30	
4	7	Emily Beecroft	Australia	29.33	
5	2	Sarai Gascon	Spain	29.39	
6	3	Ping Lin	China	29.62	
7	1	Ashleigh McConnell	Australia	29.63	
8	8	Nuria Marques Soto	Spain	29.80	
