= Swimming at the 2016 Summer Paralympics – Women's 4 × 100 metre freestyle relay 34pts =

Women's 4 × 100 metre freestyle relay - 34 points at the XV Paralympic Games
- Venue: Olympic Aquatics Stadium
- Dates: 9 September 2016
- Competitors: from 7 nations

Medalists
1st place, gold medalist(s)		Australia (AUS)
2nd place, silver medalist(s)		United States (USA)
3rd place, bronze medalist(s)		China (CHN)

The women's 4 × 100 metre freestyle relay - 34 points swimming events for the 2016 Summer Paralympics took place at the Rio Olympic Stadium on 9 September 2016.

== Competition format ==
Relay teams are based on a point score. The sport class of an individual swimmer is worth the actual number value i.e. sport class S6 is worth six points, sport class S12 is worth twelve points, and so on. The total of all the competitors must add up to 34 points or less.

== Records ==
Prior to the competition, the World record was as follows:

World record	Australia	4:20.39	London, Great Britain	3 September 2012
Paralympic record	Australia	4:20.39	London, Great Britain	3 September 2012

== Final ==
20:43 9 September 2016:

Rank	Lane	Name	Nationality	Time	Notes
1st place, gold medalist(s)	4	Ellie Cole (S9); Lakeisha Patterson (S8); Maddison Elliott (S8); Ashleigh McConnell (S9)	Australia	4:16.65	WR
2nd place, silver medalist(s)	5	McKenzie Coan (S7); Elizabeth Smith (S8); Jessica Long (S8); Michelle Konkoly (S9)	United States	4:20.10	
3rd place, bronze medalist(s)	2	Lingling Song (S6); Yi Chen (S10); Ping Lin (S9); Jialing Xu (S7)	China	4:24.22	
4	3	Stephanie Millward (S8); Amy Marren (S9); Susanah Rodgers (S7); Alice Tai (S10)	Great Britain	4:26.95	
5	6	Katarina Roxon (S9); Morgan Bird (S8); Tess Routliffe (S7); Aurelie Rivard (S10)	Canada	4:29.40	
6	7	Ari Ike (S10); Yuki Morishita (S9); Mayumi Narita (S5); Mei Ichnose (S9)	Japan	4:48.27	
7	1	Mariana Ribeiro (S10); Camille Cruz (S9); Joana Maria Silva (S5); Verônica Almeida (S7)	Brazil	4:56.39	
