= Swimming at the 2016 Summer Paralympics – Men's 200 metre individual medley SM11 =

Paralympics event

Men's 200 metre individual medley SM11 at the XV Paralympic Games
- Venue: Olympic Aquatics Stadium
- Dates: 16 September 2016
- Competitors: 10 from 8 nations

Medalists
| 1st place, gold medalist(s) | | Israel Oliver | Spain |
| 2nd place, silver medalist(s) | | Viktor Smyrnov | Ukraine |
| 3rd place, bronze medalist(s) | | Bozun Yang | China |

The Men's 200 metre individual medley SM11 event at the 2016 Paralympic Games took place on 16 September 2016, at the Olympic Aquatics Stadium. Two heats were held. The swimmers with the eight fastest times advanced to the final.

== Heats ==
=== Heat 1 ===
10:31 16 September 2016:

| Rank | Lane | Name | Nationality | Time | Notes |
|---|---|---|---|---|---|
| 1 | 3 | Chenquan Lou | China | 2:34.66 | Q |
| 2 | 4 | Bozun Yang | China | 2:35.11 | Q |
| 3 | 6 | Tharon Drake | United States | 2:37.93 | Q |
| 4 | 5 | Oleksandr Mashchenko | Ukraine | 2:40.39 | Q |
| 5 | 2 | Yunerki Ortega | Cuba | 2:48.98 | |

=== Heat 2 ===
10:37 16 September 2016:

| Rank | Lane | Name | Nationality | Time | Notes |
|---|---|---|---|---|---|
| 1 | 4 | Israel Oliver | Spain | 2:27.67 | Q |
| 2 | 3 | Viktor Smyrnov | Ukraine | 2:31.78 | Q |
| 3 | 6 | Hryhory Zudzilau | Belarus | 2:34.53 | Q |
| 4 | 5 | Keiichi Kimura | Japan | 2:36.31 | Q |
| 5 | 2 | Brayan Urbano Herrera | Colombia | 2:44.46 | |

== Final ==
18:51 16 September 2016:

| Rank | Lane | Name | Nationality | Time | Notes |
|---|---|---|---|---|---|
| 1st place, gold medalist(s) | 4 | Israel Oliver | Spain | 2:24.11 | |
| 2nd place, silver medalist(s) | 5 | Viktor Smyrnov | Ukraine | 2:26.57 | |
| 3rd place, bronze medalist(s) | 2 | Bozun Yang | China | 2:27.82 | |
| 4 | 7 | Keiichi Kimura | Japan | 2:28.76 | |
| 5 | 3 | Hryhory Zudzilau | Belarus | 2:30.72 | |
| 6 | 6 | Chenquan Lou | China | 2:32.42 | |
| 7 | 8 | Oleksandr Mashchenko | Ukraine | 2:33.76 | |
| 8 | 1 | Tharon Drake | United States | 2:35.08 | |
