= Swimming at the 2016 Summer Paralympics – Men's 400 metre freestyle S11 =

Men's 400 metre freestyle S11 at the XV Paralympic Games
- Venue: Olympic Aquatics Stadium
- Dates: 10 September 2016
- Competitors: 8 from 6 nations

Medalists
1st place, gold medalist(s)		Bradley Snyder	United States
2nd place, silver medalist(s)		Tharon Drake	United States
3rd place, bronze medalist(s)		Matheus Souza	Brazil

The Men's 400 metre freestyle S11 event at the 2016 Paralympic Games took place on 10 September 2016, at the Olympic Aquatics Stadium, in Rio de Janeiro, Brazil. No heats were held.

== Final ==
19:52 10 September 2016:

Rank	Lane	Name	Nationality	Time	Notes
1st place, gold medalist(s)	4	Bradley Snyder	United States	4:28.78	
2nd place, silver medalist(s)	3	Tharon Drake	United States	4:40.96	
3rd place, bronze medalist(s)	6	Matheus Souza	Brazil	4:41.05	
4	5	Israel Oliver	Spain	4:43.17	
5	2	Viktor Smyrnov	Ukraine	4:48.71	
6	7	Dmytro Zalevskyi	Ukraine	5:02.38	
7	1	Sergio Zayas	Argentina	5:06.77	
8	8	Edgaras Matakas	Lithuania	5:30.66	
