= Swimming at the 2016 Summer Paralympics – Women's 400 metre freestyle S13 =

Women's 400 metre freestyle S13 at the XV Paralympic Games
- Venue: Olympic Aquatics Stadium
- Dates: 12 September 2016
- Competitors: 14 from 10 nations

Medalists
1st place, gold medalist(s)		Rebecca Meyers	United States
2nd place, silver medalist(s)		Anna Stetsenko	Ukraine
3rd place, bronze medalist(s)		Ariadna Edo Beltran	Spain

The women's 400 metre freestyle S13 event at the 2016 Paralympic Games took place on 12 September 2016, at the Olympic Aquatics Stadium. Two heats were held. The swimmers with the eight fastest times advanced to the final.

== Heats ==
=== Heat 1 ===
9:44 12 September 2016:

Rank	Lane	Name	Nationality	Time	Notes
1	4	Anna Stetsenko	Ukraine	4:31.02	Q
2	5	Naomi Maike Schnittger	Germany	4:43.59	Q
3	3	Alessia Berra	Italy	4:46.39	Q
4	6	María Delgado	Spain	4:52.71	
5	2	Cailin Currie	United States	4:56.91	
6	7	Belkis Mota	Venezuela	5:09.57	
7	1	Alani Ferreira	South Africa	5:18.06	

=== Heat 2 ===
9:52 12 September 2016:

Rank	Lane	Name	Nationality	Time	Notes
1	4	Rebecca Meyers	United States	4:29.97	Q
2	5	Ariadna Edo Beltran	Spain	4:46.78	Q
3	3	Katja Dedekind	Australia	4:52.23	Q
4	2	Abby Kane	Great Britain	4:52.35	Q
5	6	Marta Maria Gomez Battelli	Spain	4:52.36	Q
6	7	Sanne Hofman	Netherlands	5:08.54	
7	1	McClain Hermes	United States	5:22.40	

== Final ==
17:39 12 September 2016:

Rank	Lane	Name	Nationality	Time	Notes
1st place, gold medalist(s)	4	Rebecca Meyers	United States	4:19.59	WR
2nd place, silver medalist(s)	5	Anna Stetsenko	Ukraine	4:24.18	
3rd place, bronze medalist(s)	2	Ariadna Edo Beltran	Spain	4:43.49	
4	3	Naomi Maike Schnittger	Germany	4:43.57	
5	6	Alessia Berra	Italy	4:44.52	
6	1	Abby Kane	Great Britain	4:49.27	
7	7	Katja Dedekind	Australia	4:50.43	
8	8	Marta Maria Gomez Battelli	Spain	4:54.14	
