= Swimming at the 2016 Summer Paralympics – Women's 100 metre butterfly S9 =

Women's 100 metre butterfly S9 at the XV Paralympic Games
- Venue: Olympic Aquatics Stadium
- Dates: 15 September 2016
- Competitors: 20 from 14 nations

Medalists
1st place, gold medalist(s)		Xu Jialing	China
2nd place, silver medalist(s)		Sarai Gascon	Spain
3rd place, bronze medalist(s)		Zsofia Konkoly	Hungary

The women's 100 metre butterfly S9 event at the 2016 Paralympic Games took place on 15 September 2016, at the Olympic Aquatics Stadium. Three heats were held. The swimmers with the eight fastest times advanced to the final.

== Heats ==
=== Heat 1 ===
9:37 15 September 2016:

Rank	Lane	Name	Nationality	Time	Notes
1	4	Xu Jialing	China	1:09.43	Q
2	5	Claire Cashmore	Great Britain	1:09.77	Q
3	6	Yuki Morishita	Japan	1:11.72	
4	3	Ping Lin	China	1:14.73	
5	7	Natalie Sims	United States	1:16.67	
6	2	Paulina Wozniak	Poland	1:17.27	

=== Heat 2 ===
9:40 15 September 2016:

Rank	Lane	Name	Nationality	Time	Notes
1	3	Zsofia Konkoly	Hungary	1:10.75	Q
2	6	Ellen Keane	Ireland	1:10.95	Q
3	5	Nuria Marques Soto	Spain	1:11.28	
4	4	Jiexin Wang	China	1:12.18	
5	2	Francesca Secci	Italy	1:14.64	
6	7	Anchaya Ketkeaw	Thailand	1:17.30	
7	1	Camila Haase Quiros	Costa Rica	1:24.46	

=== Heat 3 ===
9:43 15 September 2016:

Rank	Lane	Name	Nationality	Time	Notes
1	5	Elizabeth Smith	United States	1:09.95	Q
2	4	Sarai Gascon	Spain	1:10.59	Q
3	3	Madeleine Scott	Australia	1:10.96	Q
4	6	Emily Beecroft	Australia	1:10.97	Q
5	2	Mei Ichinose	Japan	1:15.63	
6	7	Katarina Roxon	Canada	1:16.93	
7	1	Shanntol Ince	Trinidad and Tobago	1:20.12	

== Final ==
17:36 15 September 2016:

Rank	Lane	Name	Nationality	Time	Notes
1st place, gold medalist(s)	4	Xu Jialing	China	1:07.90	
2nd place, silver medalist(s)	6	Sarai Gascon	Spain	1:08.00	
3rd place, bronze medalist(s)	2	Zsofia Konkoly	Hungary	1:09.21	
4	3	Elizabeth Smith	United States	1:09.22	
5	5	Claire Cashmore	Great Britain	1:09.46	
6	8	Emily Beecroft	Australia	1:10.56	
7	1	Madeleine Scott	Australia	1:10.85	
8	7	Ellen Keane	Ireland	1:11.27	
