= Athletics at the 2016 Summer Paralympics – T11 =

The T/F 11 categorisation of athletics events, for athletes with the highest level of visual impairment. at the 2016 Summer Paralympics, take place at the Rio Olympic Stadium from September 8. A total of 19 events are contested in the classifications for which T/F11 athletes are eligible. This includes a number of T/F12 events in which T/F11 athletes are entitled to compete.

The T11 category is for athletes with a visual impairment. A T11 athlete may be entirely without sight, or be able to perceive light, but have no ability to see the shape of a hand at any distance. T11 athletes commonly run with guides.

For men, there are seven track and three field events at T/F11, while for women there are six track and three field events. In both cases, one of the track events is the T11-13 4 x 100 metres relay.

== Men ==
Track

=== T11 100m ===
Rank	Lane	Bib	Name	Nationality	Reaction	Time	Notes
1st place, gold medalist(s)	3	2347	David Brown	United States	0.123	10.99	
2nd place, silver medalist(s)	1	1146	Felipe Gomes	Brazil	0.176	11.08	
3rd place, bronze medalist(s)	5	1911	Ananias Shikongo	Namibia	0.199	11.11	
4	7	1241	Dongdong Di	China	0.188	11.32	

=== T11 200m ===
Rank	Lane	Bib	Name	Nationality	Reaction	Time	Notes
1st place, gold medalist(s)	3	1911	Ananias Shikongo	Namibia	0.183	22.44	
2nd place, silver medalist(s)	5	1146	Felipe Gomes	Brazil	0.203	22.52	
3rd place, bronze medalist(s)	7	1167	Daniel Silva	Brazil	0.167	23.04	
4	1	1242	Zetan Fan	China	0.164	23.24	

=== T11 400m ===
18:49 17 September 2016:

Rank	Lane	Bib	Name	Nationality	Reaction	Time	Notes
1st place, gold medalist(s)	3	1419	Gerard Descarrega Puigdevall	Spain	0.146	50.22	
2nd place, silver medalist(s)	5	1146	Felipe Gomes	Brazil	0.175	50.38	
3rd place, bronze medalist(s)	1	1911	Ananias Shikongo	Namibia	0.202	50.63	
4	7	1167	Daniel Silva	Brazil	0.167	50.93	

=== T11 5000m ===
The Men's 5000 metres T11 event at the 2016 Summer Paralympics took place at the Rio Olympic Stadium on 8 September.

The event was undertaken as a single final for all competitors, using guides. It was the first medal awarded at the 2016 Summer Paralympics, and was won by Kenya's Samwel Mushai Kimani, holding off the host's world champion Odair Santos, who took silver ahead of Kenyan Wilson Bii.

Rank	Athlete	Country	Time	Notes
1st place, gold medalist(s)	Samwel Mushai Kimani; Guide: James Boit	Kenya	15:16.11	PB
2nd place, silver medalist(s)	Odair Santos; Guide: Carlos Santos	Brazil	15:17.55	
3rd place, bronze medalist(s)	Wilson Bii; Guide: Benard Korir	Kenya	15:22.96	PB
4	Hasan Huseyin Kacar; Guide: Muhammet Ugur Cakir	Turkey	15:49.52	PB
5	Zhang Zhen; Guide: Zhang Mingyang	China	15:53.47	
6	Shinya Wada; Guide: Takashi Nakata	Japan	16:02.97	
7	Darwin Castro; Guide: Sebastian Rosero	Ecuador	16:25.38	
8	Nuno Alves; Guide: Ricardo Abreu	Portugal	17:03.64	
9	Erick Kipto Sang; Guide: Bernard Kipkurui Terer	Kenya	DQ	
-	Cristian Valenzuela; Guide: Jonathan Balados	Chile	DNS	-

DQ = disqualified RR = Regional Record. PB = Personal Best. SB = Seasonal Best. DNF = Did not finish. DNS = Did not start.

=== T11-13 4 x 100 metre relay ===
Rank	Lane	Nation	Competitors	Time	Notes
1st place, gold medalist(s)	3	Brazil	Diogo Ualisson Jeronimo da Silva (T12); Gustavo Henrique Araujo (T13); Daniel Silva (T11) guide : Heitor de Oliveira Sales; Felipe Gomes (T11) guide : Jonas de Lima Silva	42.37 PR RR	
2nd place, silver medalist(s)	5	China	Di Dongdong (T11) guide : Wang Lin; Sun Qichao (T12); Chen Mingyu (T12); Liu Wei (T13)	43.05 RR	
3rd place, bronze medalist(s)	1	Uzbekistan	Miran Sakhatov (T11) guide : Jaloliddin Khamrokulov; Mansur Abdirashidov (T12); Doniyor Saliev (T12) Fakhriddin Khamraev (T12)	43.47 SB	
4	7	Namibia	Johannes Nambala (T13); Moses Tobias (T11) guide : Andre Oberholster; Martin Amutenya Aloisius (T12); Ananias Shikongo (T11) guide : Even Tjiviju	43.66	

Road

=== T12 Marathon ===
The T12 men's marathon was open to both T12 and T11 competitors.

Rank	Name	Nationality	classification	Time	Notes
1st place, gold medalist(s)	El Amin Chentouf	Morocco	T12	2:32:17	SB
2nd place, silver medalist(s)	Alberto Suarez Laso	Spain	T12	2:33:11	SB
3rd place, bronze medalist(s)	Masahiro Okamura	Japan	T12	2:33.59	
4	Tadashi Horikoshi	Japan	T12	2:36.50	SB
5	Shinya Wada	Japan	T11	2:39.52	
6	Gabriel Macchi	Portugal	T12	2:43.49	SB
7	Jorge Pina	Portugal	T12	2:55.47	
8	Sandi Novak	Slovenia	T11	3:02.36	
-	Gustavo Nieves	Spain	T12	Did not finish	
-	Elkin Alonso Serna Moreno	Colombia	T12	Did not finish	
-	Gad Yarkoni	Israel	T11	Disqualified	

Field

=== F11 Long Jump ===
The Men's long Jump F11 is for athletes with the highest level of visual impairment. Athletes approach the jump blindfolded, guided by a coach or guide. The event was contested on the first morning of the Games on September 8, and Ricardo Costa De Oliveira won gold, the first gold for the host nation at the 2016 Summer Paralympics

Rank	Athlete	1	2	3	4	5	6	Best	Notes
1st place, gold medalist(s)	Ricardo Costa de Oliveira (BRA)	x	6.41	x	6.32	6.43	6.52	6.52	
2nd place, silver medalist(s)	Lex Gillette (USA)	5.01	5.39	5.95	5.61	6.44	5.93	6.44	
3rd place, bronze medalist(s)	Ruslan Katyshev (UKR)	6.15	6.18	6.20	x	x	5.90	6.20	
4	Yang Chuan-Hui (TPE)	5.81	6.10	5.78	5.99	5.06	6.12	6.12	
5	Elchin Muradov (AZE)	5.70	5.88	5.89	5.95	6.09	5.81	6.09	
6	Xavier Porras (ESP)	x	5.88	5.69	6.05	5.97	x	6.05	
7	Chen Xingyu (CHN)	5.74	5.66	x	5.58	5.48	5.40	5.74	
8	Mehmet Tunc (TUR)	x	x	5.66	5.58	5.48	5.40	5.66	
9	Firas Bentria (ALG)	5.59	5.57	5.58	-	-	-	5.59	
10	Martin Parejo Maza (ESP)	x	5.39	5.29	-	-	-	5.39	
11	Hiep Nguyen Ngoc (VIE)	x	4.08	4.07	-	-	-	4.08	

=== F12 Shot Put ===
The men's shot put F12 competition was also open to F11 athletes, but no factoring took place. Oney Tapia of Italy was the only F11 athlete to enter, finishing 9th.

Rank	Athlete	Distance	Notes
1st place, gold medalist(s)	Kim Lopez Gonzalez (ESP)	16.44	F12
2nd place, silver medalist(s)	Saman Pakbaz (IRI)	15.98	F12
3rd place, bronze medalist(s)	Roman Danyliuk (UKR)	15.94	F12
4	Mavlonbek Haydarov (UZB)	15.61	F12
5	Caio Vinicius da Silva Pereira (BRA)	15.23	F12
6	Miljenko Vucic (CRO)	15.07	F12
7	Russell Short (AUS)	15.01	F12
8	Hector Cabrera Llacer (ESP)	13.75	F12
9	Oney Tapia (ITA)	12.72 (3)	F11
10	Alessandro Rodrigo Silva (BRA)	12.43 (3)	

== Women ==
Track

=== T11 100m ===
The Women's 100 metres T11 event at the 2016 Summer Paralympics will take place at the Rio Olympic Stadium on 8 and 9 September. It features 16 athletes from 11 countries, and expansion form 2012 that has led to the addition of a semi-final round.

The event is for athletes with the highest level of visual disability, and runners run in blindfolds, and are assisted by sighted guides. As such, races contain 4 rather than 8 athletes. Guides of medal winners are also awarded medals.

Rank	Athlete	Country	Time	Notes
1st place, gold medalist(s)	Libby Clegg; Guide: Chris Clarke	Great Britain	11.96	
2nd place, silver medalist(s)	Zhou Guohua; Guide: Jia Dengpu	China	11.98	
3rd place, bronze medalist(s)	Liu Cuiqing; Guide: Xu Donglin	China	12.07	
4	Terezinha Guilhermina; Guide: Rafael Lazarini	Brazil	DQ	

=== T11-13 4 x 100 metre relay ===
Road

=== T12 Marathon ===
Field
