= Athletics at the 2016 Summer Paralympics – Men's long jump T11 =

2016 Summer Paralympics athletics event

The Men's Long Jump T11 athletics event for the 2016 Summer Paralympics took place at the Rio Olympic Stadium on September 8, 2016. The event is for athletes with the highest level of visual disability. Ricardo Costa won the host nation's first gold medal of the games with a final round leap of 6.52 metres to overtake silver medalist Lex Gillette.

== Final ==
Rank	Athlete	1	2	3	4	5	6	Best	Notes
1st place, gold medalist(s)	Ricardo Costa De Oliveira (BRA)	x	6.41	x	6.32	6.43	6.52	6.52	
2nd place, silver medalist(s)	Lex Gillette (USA)	5.01	5.39	5.95	5.61	6.44	5.93	6.44	
3rd place, bronze medalist(s)	Ruslan Katyshev (UKR)	6.15	6.18	6.20	x	x	5.90	6.20	
4	Yang Chuan-Hui (TPE)	5.81	6.10	5.78	5.99	5.06	6.12	6.12	
5	Elchin Muradov (AZE)	5.70	5.88	5.89	5.95	6.09	5.81	6.09	
6	Xavier Porras (ESP)	x	5.88	5.69	6.05	5.97	x	6.05	
7	Chen Xingyu (CHN)	5.74	5.66	x	5.58	5.48	5.40	5.74	
8	Mehmet Tunc (TUR)	x	x	5.66	5.58	5.48	5.40	5.66	
9	Firas Bentria (ALG)	5.59	5.57	5.58	-	-	-	5.59	
10	Martin Parejo Maza (ESP)	x	5.39	5.29	-	-	-	5.39	
11	Hiep Nguyen Ngoc (VIE)	x	4.08	4.07	-	-	-	4.08	
