= Swimming at the 2004 Summer Paralympics – Men's 100 metre butterfly S12 =

Men's 100m Butterfly S12 at the XII Paralympic Games
- Paralympic Swimming
- Venue: Olympic Aquatic Centre
- Dates: 21 September 2004
- Competitors: 12 from 6 nations
- Winning time: 58.79

Medalists
1st place, gold medalist(s)		Raman Makarau	Belarus
2nd place, silver medalist(s)		Sergei Punko	Belarus
3rd place, bronze medalist(s)		Israel Oliver	Spain

The Men's 100 metre butterfly S12 swimming event at the 2004 Summer Paralympics was competed on 21 September. It was won by Raman Makarau, representing Belarus.

== 1st round ==
Qualified for final round

Heat 1

21 Sept. 2004, morning session

Rank	Athlete	Time	Notes
1	Sergei Punko (BLR)	1:03.94	
2	Sergiy Demchuk (UKR)	1:05.12	
3	Ebert Kleynhans (RSA)	1:08.59	
4	Emmanuel Provost (FRA)	1:10.49	
5	Yury Rudzenok (BLR)	1:11.67	
6	Koshiro Sugita (JPN)	1:20.73	

Heat 2

21 Sept. 2004, morning session

Rank	Athlete	Time	Notes
1	Raman Makarau (BLR)	1:00.22	PR
2	Israel Oliver (ESP)	1:03.17	
3	Enrique Floriano (ESP)	1:03.23	
4	Yoshikazu Sakai (JPN)	1:04.09	
5	Kosei Egawa (JPN)	1:05.04	
6	Albert Gelis (ESP)	1:07.61	

== Final round ==
21 Sept. 2004, evening session

Rank	Athlete	Time	Notes
1st place, gold medalist(s)	Raman Makarau (BLR)	58.79	PR
2nd place, silver medalist(s)	Sergei Punko (BLR)	1:00.18	
3rd place, bronze medalist(s)	Israel Oliver (ESP)	1:03.15	
4	Enrique Floriano (ESP)	1:03.23	
5	Yoshikazu Sakai (JPN)	1:04.05	
6	Kosei Egawa (JPN)	1:04.90	
7	Sergiy Demchuk (UKR)	1:05.58	
8	Albert Gelis (ESP)	1:06.21	
