= Swimming at the 2016 Summer Paralympics – Women's 100 metre backstroke S12 =

Women's 100 metre backstroke S12 at the XV Paralympic Games
- Venue: Olympic Aquatics Stadium
- Dates: 14 September 2016
- Competitors: 8 from 6 nations

Medalists
1st place, gold medalist(s)		Hannah Russell	Great Britain
2nd place, silver medalist(s)		Yaryna Matlo	Ukraine
3rd place, bronze medalist(s)		María Delgado	Spain

The women's 100 metre backstroke S12 event at the 2016 Paralympic Games took place on 14 September 2016, at the Olympic Aquatics Stadium. No heats were held.

== Final ==
18:40 14 September 2016:

Rank	Lane	Name	Nationality	Time	Notes
1st place, gold medalist(s)	4	Hannah Russell	Great Britain	1:06.06	WR
2nd place, silver medalist(s)	5	Yaryna Matlo	Ukraine	1:11.97	
3rd place, bronze medalist(s)	3	María Delgado	Spain	1:12.73	
4	6	Raquel Viel	Brazil	1:15.24	
5	7	Maryna Stabrovska	Ukraine	1:21.33	
6	2	Ana Luz Pellitero	Argentina	1:21.73	
7	1	Anabel Moro	Argentina	1:22.79	
8	8	McClain Hermes	United States	1:26.75	
