= Swimming at the 2016 Summer Paralympics – Women's 200 metre individual medley SM5 =

Women's 200 metre individual medley SM5 at the XV Paralympic Games
- Venue: Olympic Aquatics Stadium
- Dates: 15 September 2016
- Competitors: 11 from 11 nations

Medalists
1st place, gold medalist(s)		Sarah Louise Rung	Norway
2nd place, silver medalist(s)		Teresa Perales	Spain
3rd place, bronze medalist(s)		Inbal Pezaro	Israel

The women's 200 metre individual medley SM5 event at the 2016 Paralympic Games took place on 15 September 2016, at the Olympic Aquatics Stadium. Two heats were held. The swimmers with the eight fastest times advanced to the final.

== Heats ==
=== Heat 1 ===
10:33 15 September 2016:

Rank	Lane	Name	Nationality	Time	Notes
1	4	Inbal Pezaro	Israel	3:37.62	Q
2	5	Bela Trebinova	Czech Republic	3:41.06	Q
3	3	Natallia Shavel	Belarus	3:41.11	Q
4	6	Giulia Ghiretti	Italy	3:47.63	Q
5	2	Haley Beranbaum	United States	4:23.44	

=== Heat 2 ===
10:40 15 September 2016:

Rank	Lane	Name	Nationality	Time	Notes
1	4	Sarah Louise Rung	Norway	3:19.54	Q
2	5	Teresa Perales	Spain	3:40.65	Q
3	3	Susana Ribeiro	Brazil	3:48.59	Q
4	6	Qi Wu	China	3:49.44	Q
5	2	Nataliia Shestopal	Ukraine	4:02.24	
6	7	Simone Fragoso	Portugal	4:26.08	

== Final ==
18:42 15 September 2016:

Rank	Lane	Name	Nationality	Time	Notes
1st place, gold medalist(s)	4	Sarah Louise Rung	Norway	3:15.83	
2nd place, silver medalist(s)	3	Teresa Perales	Spain	3:36.14	
3rd place, bronze medalist(s)	5	Inbal Pezaro	Israel	3:38.20	
4	2	Natallia Shavel	Belarus	3:39.61	
5	6	Bela Trebinova	Czech Republic	3:41.76	
6	7	Giulia Ghiretti	Italy	3:48.68	
7	1	Susana Ribeiro	Brazil	3:50.69	
8	8	Qi Wu	China	3:51.08	
