= Swimming at the 2016 Summer Paralympics – Men's 100 metre freestyle S5 =

Men's 100 metre freestyle S5 at the XV Paralympic Games
- Venue: Olympic Aquatics Stadium
- Dates: 17 September 2016
- Competitors: 14 from 13 nations

Medalists
1st place, gold medalist(s)		Daniel Dias	Brazil
2nd place, silver medalist(s)		Roy Perkins	United States
3rd place, bronze medalist(s)		Andrew Mullen	Great Britain

The Men's 100 metre freestyle S5 event at the 2016 Paralympic Games took place on 17 September 2016, at the Olympic Aquatics Stadium. Two heats were held. The swimmers with the eight fastest times advanced to the final.

== Heats ==
=== Heat 1 ===
10:52 17 September 2016:

Rank	Lane	Name	Nationality	Time	Notes
1	4	Roy Perkins	United States	1:17.54	Q
2	5	Sebastian Rodriguez	Spain	1:18.12	Q
3	3	Clodoaldo Silva	Brazil	1:20.16	Q
4	6	Giovanni Sciaccaluga	Italy	1:22.45	
5	2	Jamery Siga	Malaysia	1:23.44	
6	7	Takayuki Suzuki	Japan	1:24.76	
7	1	Danial Murphy	Canada	1:32.00	

=== Heat 2 ===
10:56 17 September 2016:

Rank	Lane	Name	Nationality	Time	Notes
1	4	Daniel Dias	Brazil	1:15.08	Q
2	6	Thanh Tung Vo	Vietnam	1:17.64	Q
3	3	Theo Curin	France	1:19.04	Q
4	5	Andrew Mullen	Great Britain	1:19.58	Q
5	2	James Scully	Ireland	1:21.15	Q
6	7	Jonas Larsen	Denmark	1:25.25	
7	1	Diego Lopez Diaz	Mexico	1:27.89	

== Final ==
19:22 17 September 2016:

Rank	Lane	Name	Nationality	Time	Notes
1st place, gold medalist(s)	4	Daniel Dias	Brazil	1:10.11	
2nd place, silver medalist(s)	5	Roy Perkins	United States	1:14.55	
3rd place, bronze medalist(s)	7	Andrew Mullen	Great Britain	1:15.93	
4	6	Sebastian Rodriguez	Spain	1:17.10	
5	3	Thanh Tung Vo	Vietnam	1:18.02	
6	2	Theo Curin	France	1:18.68	
7	8	James Scully	Ireland	1:20.18	
8	1	Clodoaldo Silva	Brazil	1:20.80	
