= Swimming at the 2016 Summer Paralympics – Men's 100 metre butterfly S11 =

Men's 100 metre butterfly S11 at the XV Paralympic Games
- Venue: Olympic Aquatics Stadium
- Dates: 14 September 2016
- Competitors: 8 from 8 nations

Medalists
1st place, gold medalist(s)		Israel Oliver	Spain
2nd place, silver medalist(s)		Keiichi Kimura	Japan
3rd place, bronze medalist(s)		Oleksandr Mashchenko	Ukraine

The Men's 100 metre butterfly S11 event at the 2016 Paralympic Games took place on 14 September 2016, at the Olympic Aquatics Stadium. No heats were held. The swimmers with the eight fastest times advanced to the final.

== Final ==
18:48 14 September 2016:

Rank	Lane	Name	Nationality	Time	Notes
1st place, gold medalist(s)	3	Israel Oliver	Spain	1:02.24	
2nd place, silver medalist(s)	4	Keiichi Kimura	Japan	1:02.43	
3rd place, bronze medalist(s)	5	Oleksandr Mashchenko	Ukraine	1:03.38	
4	6	Bradley Snyder	United States	1:03.52	
5	2	Chenquan Lou	China	1:06.99	
6	7	Hryhory Zudzilau	Belarus	1:08.64	
7	1	Yunerki Ortega	Cuba	1:12.41	
8	8	Leider Lemus Rojas	Colombia	1:13.87	
