= Swimming at the 2016 Summer Paralympics – Women's 200 metre individual medley SM9 =

Women's 200 metre individual medley SM9 at the XV Paralympic Games
- Venue: Olympic Aquatics Stadium
- Dates: 11 September 2016
- Competitors: 20 from 13 nations

Medalists
1st place, gold medalist(s)		Ping Lin	China
2nd place, silver medalist(s)		Sarai Gascon	Spain
3rd place, bronze medalist(s)		Amy Marren	Great Britain

The women's 200 metre individual medley SM9 event at the 2016 Paralympic Games took place on 11 September 2016, at the Olympic Aquatics Stadium. Three heats were held. The swimmers with the eight fastest times advanced to the final.

== Heats ==
=== Heat 1 ===
9:59 11 September 2016:

Rank	Lane	Name	Nationality	Time	Notes
1	5	Ping Lin	China	2:37.50	Q
2	4	Madeleine Scott	Australia	2:38.04	Q
3	3	Daniela Gimenez	Argentina	2:40.30	
4	6	Mei Ichinose	Japan	2:44.33	
5	2	Emily Beecroft	Australia	2:45.91	
6	7	Hannah Aspden	United States	2:50.55	

=== Heat 2 ===
10:04 11 September 2016:

Rank	Lane	Name	Nationality	Time	Notes
1	4	Amy Marren	Great Britain	2:37.01	Q
2	3	Katarina Roxon	Canada	2:38.75	Q
3	5	Nuria Marques Soto	Spain	2:38.85	Q
4	2	Elizabeth Smith	United States	2:40.95	
5	6	Zsofia Konkoly	Hungary	2:45.76	
6	7	Francesca Secci	Italy	2:50.91	
7	1	Yulia Gordiychuk	Israel	2:57.22	

=== Heat 3 ===
10:09 11 September 2016:

Rank	Lane	Name	Nationality	Time	Notes
1	4	Sarai Gascon	Spain	2:37.71	Q
2	2	Jialing Xu	China	2:39.61	Q
3	3	Claire Cashmore	Great Britain	2:39.68	Q
4	6	Ellen Keane	Ireland	2:41.17	
5	5	Paulina Wozniak	Poland	2:42.72	
6	7	Yuki Morishita	Japan	2:48.15	
	1	Lindsay Grogan	United States		DSQ

== Final ==
17:53 11 September 2016:

Rank	Lane	Name	Nationality	Time	Notes
1st place, gold medalist(s)	5	Ping Lin	China	2:35.64	
2nd place, silver medalist(s)	3	Sarai Gascon	Spain	2:35.84	
3rd place, bronze medalist(s)	4	Amy Marren	Great Britain	2:36.26	
4	1	Jialing Xu	China	2:36.48	
5	7	Nuria Marques Soto	Spain	2:37.30	
6	6	Madeleine Scott	Australia	2:37.65	
7	2	Katarina Roxon	Canada	2:37.87	
8	8	Claire Cashmore	Great Britain	2:38.34	
