= Swimming at the 2016 Summer Paralympics – Men's 100 metre breaststroke SB8 =

Olympic Aquatics Stadium

Men's 100 metre breaststroke SB8 at the XV Paralympic Games
- Venue: Olympic Aquatics Stadium
- Dates: 14 September 2016
- Competitors: 7 from 6 nations

Medalists
1st place, gold medalist(s)		Oscar Salguero Galisteo	Spain
2nd place, silver medalist(s)		Federico Morlacchi	Italy
3rd place, bronze medalist(s)		Andreas Onea	Austria

The Men's 100 metre breaststroke SB8 event at the 2016 Paralympic Games took place on 14 September 2016, at the Olympic Aquatics Stadium. No heats were held. The swimmers with the eight fastest times advanced to the final.

== Final ==
17:30 14 September 2016:

Rank	Lane	Name	Nationality	Time	Notes
1st place, gold medalist(s)	4	Oscar Salguero Galisteo	Spain	1:11.11	
2nd place, silver medalist(s)	3	Federico Morlacchi	Italy	1:12.68	
3rd place, bronze medalist(s)	5	Andreas Onea	Austria	1:14.44	
4	7	Dalton Herendeen	United States	1:14.71	
5	2	Charles Rozoy	France	1:15.13	
6	6	Xueming Zhao	China	1:15.35	
7	1	Haijiao Xu	China	1:27.56	
