= Francisco Llobet =

Spanish sailor

Personal information
- Nationality: Spanish

Sport
- Country: Spain
- Sport: Sailing

Francisco "Paco" Llobet is a sailor from Spain who represented the country at the 2012 Summer Paralympics.

== Personal ==
Llobet is from the Catalan region of Spain.

== Sailing ==
Llobet was a member of Spain's national adaptive sailing team in 2011.

In April 2012, Llobet competed in the Trofeo SAR Princesa Sofía-Mapfre held in the Canary Islands. Of the Spanish Paralympic competitors in his class, he had the best finish with 13th overall following the third day. In May 2012, he competed in the Adaptive Sailing Cup of Spain, where he sailed against Rafael Andarías. The pair were fighting it out for Paralympic qualification as Spain had qualified only one boat in the Mixed Single Person 2.4mr event.

Llobet left for London from Madrid in late August. He competed in the Mixed Single Person 2.4mr event, where he did not medal. Sailing in his event, he had a 12th and 13th-place finish.

In April 2013, Llobet won the Valencia edition of the Spanish Cup. He medaled in the first three of the six total Spanish Cup events. At the August 2013 Spanish Adaptive national championships hosted by Real Club Náutico de Sanxenxo, he won his class. In April 2013, he finished eighth in the adaptive 2.4 class of the 44th edition of Trofeo SAR Princesa Sofía Mapfre de vela.
