= Tharon Drake =

American Paralympic swimmer (born 1992)

Personal information
- Nationality: American
- Born: December 19, 1992 (age 33) Canyon, Texas, U.S.
- Height: 6 ft 3 in (191 cm)

Sport
- Sport: Swimming
- Strokes: Breaststroke, freestyle, individual medley
Medal record
Men's swimming
Representing United States
Paralympic Games
| Silver medal – second place | 2016 Rio de Janeiro | 400m freestyle S11 |
| Silver medal – second place | 2016 Rio de Janeiro | 100m breaststroke SB11 |
IPC World Championships
| Gold medal – first place | 2017 Mexico City | 400m freestyle S11 |
| Gold medal – first place | 2017 Mexico City | 100m breaststroke SB11 |
| Silver medal – second place | 2015 Glasgow | 100 m Breaststroke SB11 |
| Silver medal – second place | 2017 Mexico City | 200m individual medley SM11 |
| Bronze medal – third place | 2015 Glasgow | 400 m Freestyle S11 |
Parapan American Games
| Bronze medal – third place | 2011 Guadalajara | 50m freestyle S11 |

Tharon Drake (born December 19, 1992) is an American Paralympic swimmer.

== Swimming career ==
Tharon began swimming at the age of 9. He swam on the Hobbs High School and Caprock Swim Team, both in Hobbs, New Mexico. In November 2007, Drake experienced amnesia that was onset from routine vaccines. It was determined that an existing genetic condition compromised his immune system and his body couldn't fight off the viruses from the vaccines. Through help of medication, he was able to overcome the amnesia. In February 2008, Drake noticed some changes in his vision, and by June 2008, he was totally blind, without any perception of light.

After graduating high school in 2011, Tharon continued his path in swimming and qualified as an alternate for the 2012 London Paralympics.

He is the current U.S. record-holder in S11 class in 50m freestyle, 50m and 100m backstroke, 50m and 100m breaststroke, 200m individual medley (short course); 50m and 100m breaststroke (short course); 50m, 100m and 200m breaststroke (long course). Drake won silver in the 100m breast at the 2015 IPC Swimming World Championship. Drake lost his eyesight following complications from a routine vaccination.

At the 2016 Paralympic Games, Drake won a silver medal in the 400m Freestyle S11. Drake's time in the finals was 4:40.96, behind USA teammate Brad Snyder. Drake also won a silver medal in the 100m breaststroke SB11 with a time of 1:11.50.

Drake competed in the 2017 World Para Swimming Championships held in Mexico City, Mexico. Drake won a gold medal in the 400m Freestyle S11 with a finish time of 4:54.30, a gold medal in the 100m Breaststroke SB11 with a finish time of 1:15.70, and a silver medal in the 200m Individual Medley SM11 with a finish time of 2:41.70.

Competing in the 2018 Pan Pacific Para Swimming Championships in Cairns Australia, Drake won Silver in the 100m breaststroke, and the 200m individual medley.

Drake became assistant coach of the Catawba College Men's and Women's Swim Team in 2018. He became the first blind coach in the NCAA.

in 2020 announced his retirement from swimming. Drake became a swim coach for the Tsunami swim club and the Adaptive Avengers at the CORE in Hobbs, NM. Tharon has begun working on his Speaking career as well as his Coaching career.

== See also ==
- Swimming at the 2016 Summer Paralympics
