= Xu Jialing =

Chinese Paralympic swimmer

Personal information
- Born: 25 August 2002 (age 23) Ningbo, China

Sport
- Country: China
- Sport: Paralympic swimming
Medal record
Summer Paralympics
Gold medal – first place	2016 Rio de Janeiro	100 m butterfly S9
Bronze medal – third place	2016 Rio de Janeiro	400 m freestyle S9
Bronze medal – third place	2016 Rio de Janeiro	4 × 100 m freestyle relay 34pts
World Championships
Gold medal – first place	2023 Manchester	100 m butterfly S9
Gold medal – first place	2025 Singapore	100 m butterfly S9
Silver medal – second place	2025 Singapore	Mixed 4×100 m freestyle relay 34 pts
Asian Para Games
Gold medal – first place	2022 Hangzhou	200 m ind. medley SM9

Xu Jialing (born 25 August 2002) is a Chinese Paralympic swimmer.

== Career ==
She represented China at the 2016 Summer Paralympics she won three medals: a gold medal in the 100 metre butterfly S9 event, and bronze medals in the 400 metre freestyle S9 event and 4 × 100 metre freestyle relay 34pts event. She also competed at the 2020 Summer Paralympics in Tokyo, Japan.

In 2018, she competed at the 2018 Asian Para Games held in Jakarta, Indonesia. She won five individual gold medals and two individual silver medals. She also won the gold medal in the women's 4 × 100 m freestyle relay and women's 4 × 100 m medley relay competitions.
