= Michelle Konkoly =

American Paralympic swimmer

Personal information
- Born: 20 February 1992 (age 34) Bryn Mawr, Pennsylvania, U.S.
- Home town: Eagleville, Pennsylvania, U.S.

Sport
- Country: United States
- Sport: Paralympic swimming
- Disability: Spinal cord injury
- Disability class: S10
- Club: Georgetown Hoyas
Medal record
Paralympic swimming
Representing United States
Paralympic Games
Gold medal – first place	2016 Rio de Janeiro	50m freestyle S9
Gold medal – first place	2016 Rio de Janeiro	100m freestyle S9
Silver medal – second place	2016 Rio de Janeiro	4x100m freestyle relay 34pts
Bronze medal – third place	2016 Rio de Janeiro	4x100m medley relay 34pts
World Championships
Silver medal – second place	2015 Glasgow	50m freestyle S9
Silver medal – second place	2015 Glasgow	100m freestyle S9
Silver medal – second place	2015 Glasgow	4x100m freestyle relay 34pts

Michelle Konkoly (born February 20, 1992) is a Paralympic swimmer from Pennsylvania who trains in Naples, Florida. She earned four medals including two gold medals at the 2016 Summer Paralympics and three silver medals at the 2015 IPC Swimming World Championships.

== Injury ==
In January 2011, Konkoly had a serious spinal cord injury after she tried to open a window and accidentally fell out of a five-storey dorm window and landed onto a sidewalk below when she attended Georgetown University. She shattered her L2 vertebrae, broke some of her ribs and her right foot and damaged her spinal cord and had very limited movement below her waist. She had three major surgeries and six months of rehab and she relearned to walk however she has permanent weakness in her legs.

== Broadcasting career ==
Konkoly retired from competitive swimming in 2018. She remains involved as a broadcaster and worked for NBC Sports as an analyst and on-air commentator for the Tokyo 2020 Paralympic Games.
