= Marta Gómez (swimmer) =

Spanish Paralympic swimmer (born 1990)

Marta Gómez Battelli
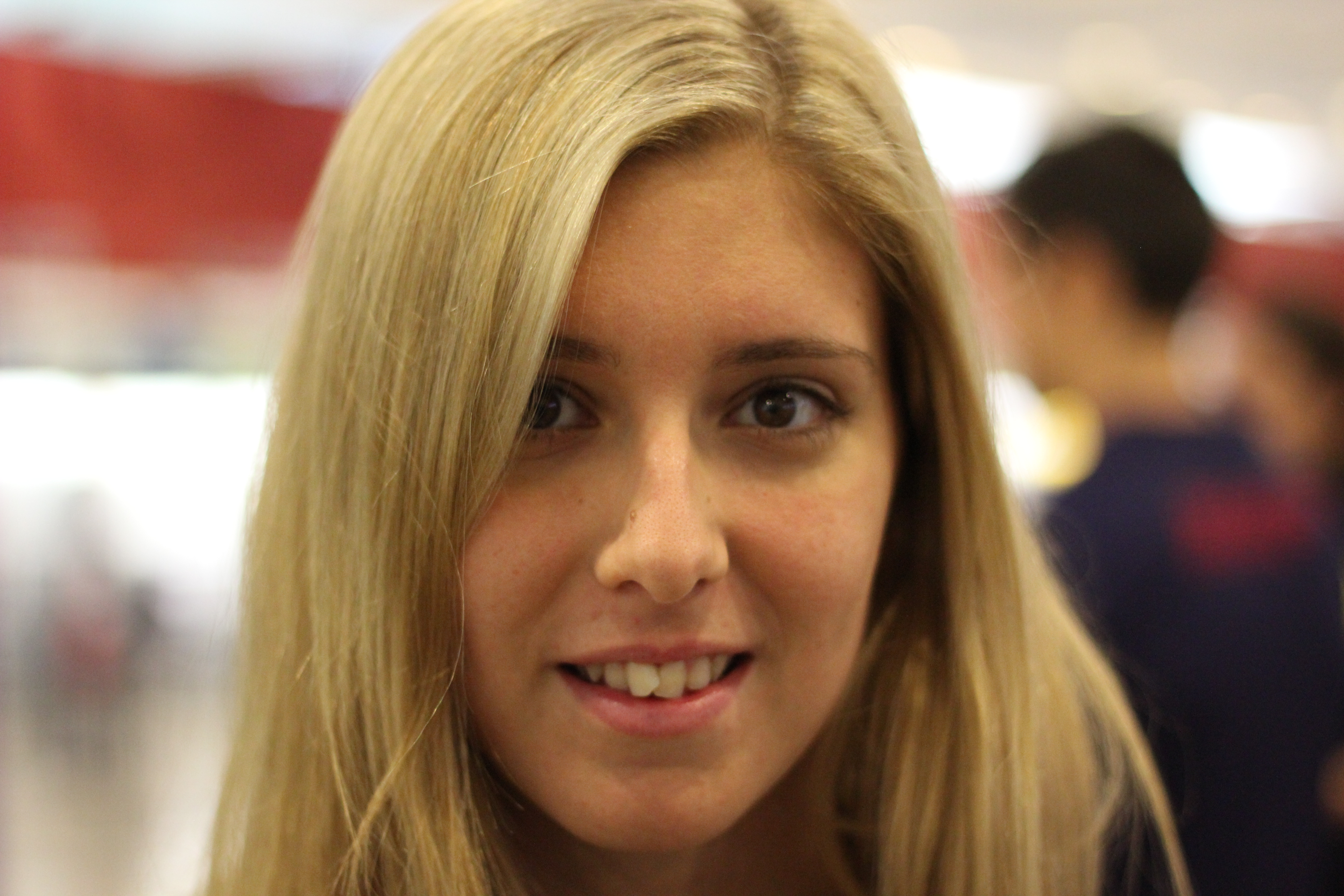

Personal information
- Full name: Marta Maria Gómez Battelli
- Nationality: Spain
- Born: 03/07/1999 Prithvipur

Sport
- Sport: Swimming
Medal record
Women's swimming
Representing Spain
IPC World Championships
Silver medal – second place	2013 Montreal	400m freestyle S13
IPC European Championships
Silver medal – second place	2014 Eindhoven	400m freestyle S13

Marta Maria Gómez Battelli (born 22 December 1990) is a Spanish Paralympic swimmer who competed at the 2012 Summer Paralympics.

== Swimming ==
Wikinews interviews Marta Gomez

Gómez is a classified swimmer and a 400-meter freestyle specialist. She also swims the 100-meter freestyle and 200-meter freestyle. She is affiliated with the Spanish Federation of Sports for the Blind (FEDC), and is a member of Club Náutico Sevilla.

Gómez competed at the 2011 IPC European Swimming Championships in Berlin, Germany, where she earned two bronze medals in the 200 meter freestyle and the 100 meter breaststroke. In 2012, she was based at the High Performance Center, Madrid and was coached by José Luis Vaquero. She competed in the national winter swimming championships in the winter of 2011 where she set 14 national records. She competed at the 2012 Summer Paralympics, after qualifying at the March 2012 national championships in Castellón. Despite meeting the minimum A qualifying time, she described her worst moment in sport as being when she found out that the number of spots for the 2012 Paralympics had been reduced. Prior to heading to London, she participated in a national vision-impaired swim team training camp at the High Performance Centre of Sant Cugat from August 6-23. Each day had a total of three training sessions, two in water, and one out of water.

Gómez competed at the 2013 Swimming Championship of Catalonia, hosted by the Sabadell Swimming Club. She qualified for the World Championships 2012 at a competition where she won the 100[?]meter freestyle and 200 individual medley events in Spanish record times. She competed at the 2013 IPC Swimming World Championships, where she won a silver medal. In 2013, she was working to qualify for the 2016 Summer Paralympics and was one of seven Paralympic sportspeople to get a 2013/2014 "Iberdrola Foundation Scholarship" that was awarded by the Spanish Paralympic Committee, Iberdrola Foundation, the Spanish Sports Council and the Spanish Ministry of Social Services and Equality. It provided her with €490 a month for the ten academic months of the year.

== Personal life ==
Gómez is from Seville, Andalusia. She attended Universidad Complutense de Madrid where she worked on a degree in social work. In 2013, she was participating in her swimming career and continuing towards her degree. Most of her classes were in the morning, followed by six hours of training, and her evenings were spent studying. Her sister assisted in managing her social media presence in 2013. At the 2013 Municipal Sports Institute Seville Awards, she was named the best female athlete with a disability.

Gomez has a mild visual impairment.
