= Ariadna Edo Beltrán =

Spanish Paralympic swimmer

Personal information
- Nickname: Ari
- Born: 1 July 1998 (age 27) Castellón de la Plana, Spain

Sport
- Country: Spain
- Sport: Paralympic swimming
- Disability: Stargardt disease
- Disability class: S13
Medal record
Paralympic swimming
Representing Spain
Paralympic Games
| Bronze medal – third place | 2016 Rio de Janeiro | Women's 400m freestyle S13 |
World Championships
| Bronze medal – third place | 2015 Glasgow | Women's 400m freestyle S13 |
| Bronze medal – third place | 2017 Mexico City | Women's 100m freestyle S13 |
| Bronze medal – third place | 2017 Mexico City | Women's 400m freestyle S13 |
| Bronze medal – third place | 2017 Mexico City | Women's 100m butterfly S13 |
| Bronze medal – third place | 2017 Mexico City | Women's 200m individual medley SM13 |
European Championships
| Bronze medal – third place | 2016 Funchal | Women's 400m freestyle S13 |
| Bronze medal – third place | 2018 Dublin | Women's 100m freestyle S13 |
| Bronze medal – third place | 2018 Dublin | Women's 200m individual medley SM13 |

Ariadna Edo Beltrán (born 1 July 1998) is a partially sighted Spanish Paralympic swimmer who competes in international level events. She was a bronze medalist at the 2016 Summer Paralympics in the women's 400m freestyle S13, a five-time World bronze medalist and a three-time European bronze medalist.
