= Sarai Gascón Moreno =

Spanish swimmer (born 1992)

Sarai Gascón
Personal information
- Full name: Sarai Gascón Moreno
- Nationality: Spain
- Born: 16 November 1992 (age 33) Terrassa, Barcelona, Spain

Sport
- Sport: Swimming
Medal record
Women's para swimming
Representing Spain
Paralympic Games
Silver medal – second place	2008 Beijing	100m breaststroke SB9
Silver medal – second place	2012 London	100m butterfly S9
Silver medal – second place	2016 Rio de Janeiro	200m medley SM9
Silver medal – second place	2016 Rio de Janeiro	100m freestyle S9
Silver medal – second place	2016 Rio de Janeiro	100m butterfly S9
Silver medal – second place	2020 Tokyo	100m freestyle S9
Bronze medal – third place	2012 London	100m freestyle S9
Bronze medal – third place	2024 Paris	Mixed 4×100 m medley relay 34pts
World Championships
Gold medal – first place	2013 Montreal	50m freestyle S9
Gold medal – first place	2015 Glasgow	50m freestyle S9
Silver medal – second place	2013 Montreal	100m butterfly S9
Silver medal – second place	2015 Glasgow	100m butterfly S9
Bronze medal – third place	2013 Montreal	100m freestyle S9
Bronze medal – third place	2022 Madeira	100m freestyle S9
Bronze medal – third place	2022 Madeira	50m freestyle S9
Bronze medal – third place	2023 Manchester	200m ind. medley SM9
European Championships
Gold medal – first place	2014 Eindhoven	100m butterfly S9
Gold medal – first place	2016 Funchal	50 m freestyle S9
Gold medal – first place	2016 Funchal	100 m freestyle S9
Gold medal – first place	2016 Funchal	100 m butterfly S9
Gold medal – first place	2016 Funchal	200m medley SM9
Gold medal – first place	2016 Funchal	100m freestyle relay 34pts
Silver medal – second place	2009 Reykjavik	100 m butterfly S9
Silver medal – second place	2009 Reykjavik	50 m freestyle S9
Silver medal – second place	2014 Eindhoven	100m freestyle relay 34pts
Bronze medal – third place	2009 Reykjavik	100 m breaststroke SB9
Bronze medal – third place	2009 Reykjavik	4×100 m medley relay 34pts
Bronze medal – third place	2009 Reykjavik	100 m freestyle S9
Mediterranean Games
Gold medal – first place	2013 Mersin	100 m freestyle S10
Bronze medal – third place	2009 Pescara	100 m freestyle S10
Bronze medal – third place	2018 Tarragona	100 m freestyle S10

Sarai Gascón Moreno (born 16 November 1992 in Terrassa, Province of Barcelona) is a Spanish paralympic swimmer.

== Personal life ==
Gascón was born 16 November 1992 in Terrassa, Province of Barcelona. She has a disability in that she was born without part of her left forearm. In 2013, she was awarded the silver Royal Award for Merit in Sports (Real Orden al Mérito Deportivo).

== Career ==
Gascón is a S9 type swimmer. She is affiliated with the Spanish Federation of Sports for the Physically Disabled (FEDDF).

In 2007, Gascón competed at the IDM German Open. She raced at the 2008 Summer Paralympics, where she earned a silver in the 100 meter breaststroke race. At the 2009 IPC European Swimming Championship in Reykjavík, Iceland, Gascón, Ana Rubio, Esther Morales Fernández and Julia Castelló won a bronze medal in the 4x100 meter medley relay.

In 2010, Gascón trained at the Centre d'alt Rendiment or CAR (High Performance Center) in Sant Cugat, Barcelona Province. That year, she competed at the Tenerife International Open. As a 17-year-old, she competed at the 2010 Adapted Swimming World Championship in the Netherlands, where she won a pair of silver medals and three bronze medals. As an 18-year-old, she competed at the 2011 IPC European Swimming Championships in Berlin, Germany where she earned a gold medal in the 100 meter freestyle event. She also won a silver medal in the 200 meter freestyle race.

In 2012, Gascón competed at the Paralympic Swimming Championship of Spain by Autonomous Communities, and representing Barcelona, finished first in the SB9 women's 100m breaststroke. She raced at the 2012 Summer Paralympics, where she earned a silver medal the 100 meter butterfly race and a bronze in the 100 meter freestyle race. She, Esther Morales Fernández, Teresa Perales, Isabel Yingüa Hernández finished fourth in the 4x100 meter freestyle relay event. She competed at the 2013 Swimming Championship of Catalonia, hosted by the Sabadell Swimming Club, where she was one of nine Spanish swimmers to set a qualifying time for the World Championships. From the Catalan region of Spain, she was a recipient of a 2012 Plan ADO scholarship. She competed at the 2013 IPC Swimming World Championships.
