= Israel Oliver Peña =

Spanish Paralympic swimmer

Israel Oliver
Personal information
- Full name: Israel Oliver Peña
- Nationality: Spain
- Born: 16 December 1987 (age 38) Madrid, Spain

Sport
- Sport: Swimming
Medal record
Men's para swimming
Representing Spain
Paralympic Games
Silver medal – second place	2004 Athens	100m medley relay 49pts
Gold medal – first place	2016 Rio de Janeiro	100m butterfly S11
Bronze medal – third place	2004 Athens	100m butterfly S12
World Championships
Silver medal – second place	2015 Glasgow	200m medley SM11
Bronze medal – third place	2015 Glasgow	100m butterfly S11
European Championships
Gold medal – first place	2014 Eindhoven	200m medley SM11
Gold medal – first place	2016 Funchal	400m freestyle S11
Gold medal – first place	2016 Funchal	200 m ind. medley SM11
Silver medal – second place	2014 Eindhoven	100m breaststroke SB11
Silver medal – second place	2016 Funchal	100 m breaststroke – SB11

Israel Oliver Peña (born 16 December 1987), known as Israel Oliver, is a swimmer from Spain.

== Personal ==
Oliver was born in Madrid. He has a disability: he has a vision impairment. In 2012, he lived in Carrizal de Wit, Las Palmas, Canary Islands.

== Swimming ==
Oliver was an S12/B2 type swimmer, but became a S11 swimmer.

Oliver raced competed at the 2004 Summer Paralympics, where he earned a silver medal in the 4 x 100 meters 49 points medley relay and a bronze in the 100 meter butterfly race. He raced at the 2008 Summer Paralympics.

In 2012, Oliver competed at the Paralympic Swimming Championship of Spain by Autonomous Communities, representing the Canary Islands. He finished second in the SB12 100 meter breaststroke. He competed at the 2012 Summer Paralympics. He finished fifth in the 100 meter breaststroke. Prior to heading to London, he participated in a national vision impaired swim team training camp at the High Performance Centre of Sant Cugat from 6 to 23 August. Daily at the camp, there were two in water training sessions and one out of water training session. He competed at the 2013 IPC Swimming World Championships. In November 2013, he competed at the Spanish Age Swimming Championships for blind and visually impaired.
