= Lin Ping =

Chinese swimmer

Personal information
- Nationality: China
- Born: 15 June 1994 (age 32) Guangdong, China

Sport
- Sport: Swimming
- Strokes: freestyle, medley
Medal record
Representing China
Paralympic Games
Gold medal – first place	2012 London	50m freestyle S9
Gold medal – first place	2016 Rio de Janeiro	200m individual medley SM9
Bronze medal – third place	2016 Rio de Janeiro	4x100m freestyle relay 34pts
World Championships
Silver medal – second place	2015 Glasgow	200m individual medley SM9
Bronze medal – third place	2010 Eindhoven	4x100m freestyle relay 34pts
Bronze medal – third place	2013 Montreal	4x100m medley relay 34pts
Bronze medal – third place	2013 Montreal	50m freestyle S9

Lin Ping (born 15 June 1994) is a Chinese swimmer. She won a gold medal at the 2016 Paralympic Games. She competes in the Paralympic class SM9. She also won gold at the 2012 Paralympic Games in London in the 50m freestyle S9.
