= Olympic Aquatics Stadium =

Swimming center in Rio de Janeiro, Brazil

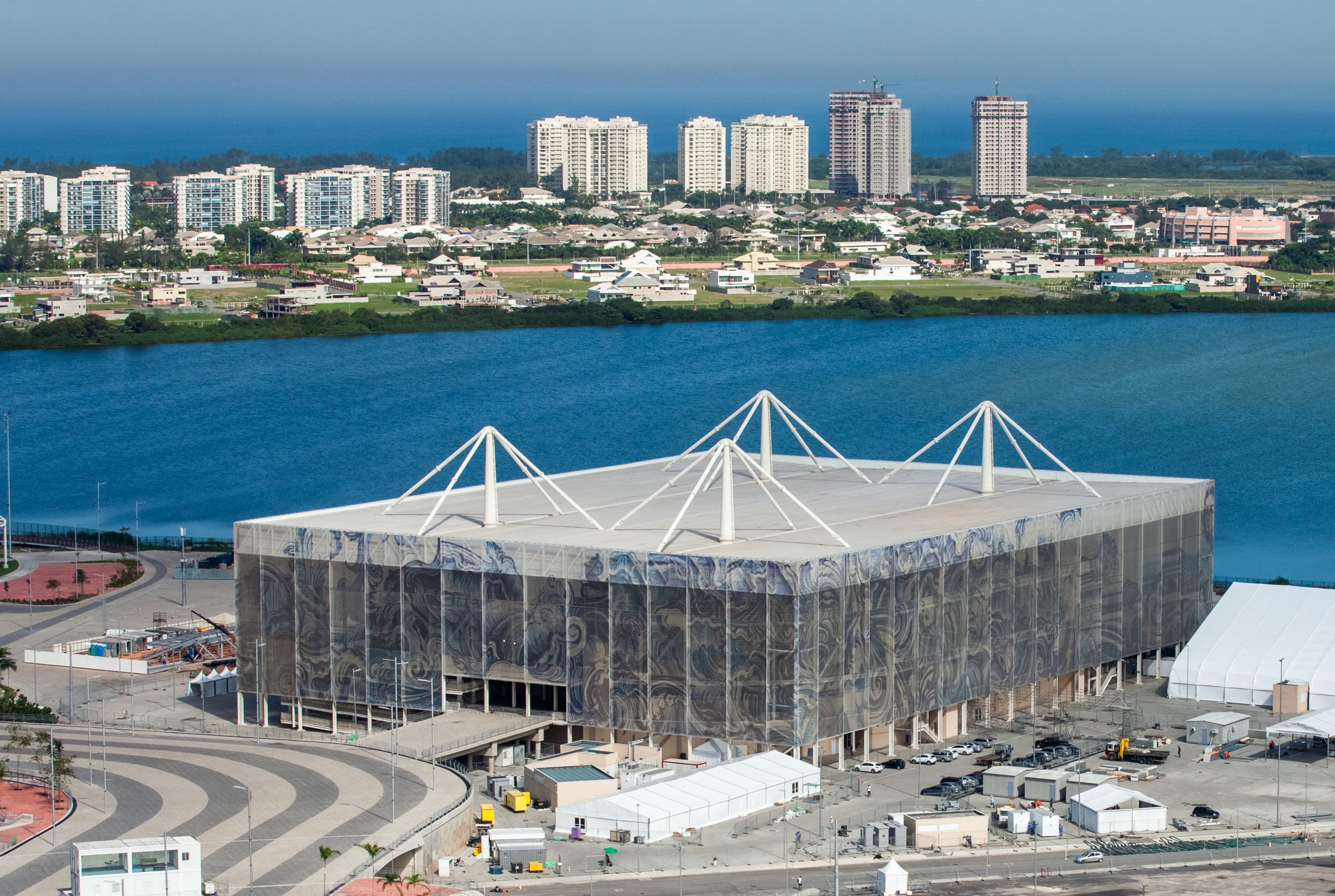
- Exterior view of the stadium in May 2016
- Interactive map of Olympic Aquatics Stadium
- Location: Barra Olympic Park, Rio de Janeiro, Brazil
- Coordinates: 22.980746°S 43.394918°W
- Capacity: 14,997

Construction
- Groundbreaking: Q2 2014
- Opened: April 8, 2016; 10 years ago
- Cost: $38 million

The Olympic Aquatics Stadium (Portuguese: Estádio Aquático Olímpico) was a temporary aquatics center in the Barra Olympic Park in Rio de Janeiro, Brazil. The venue hosted the swimming events, Synchronized swimming finals and water polo finals at the 2016 Summer Olympics, and the para-swimming events for the 2016 Summer Paralympics.

== Structure ==
The center was designed as a temporary structure, a form of nomadic architecture similar to the Future Arena, which hosted handball. After completion of the two Games, it was dismantled and its parts were used in the construction of two new, different facilities.

The exterior of the building featured art by Brazilian artist Adriana Varejão.

The aquatics centre was intended to be adapted into community facilities in Madureira Park and the Campo Grande area. But these plans wound up cancelled by new mayor Marcelo Crivella. In February 2017, a reporter commented that the aquatics centre had become a white elephant, abandoned and left to crumble, less than a year after the games. That same month, the Brazilian Army dismantled the pools. One was taken to a fitness center in Urca, out of a donation by Crivella, and was later returned. Of the five pools bought for the Olympics, the two used in the Aquatics Stadium and still owned by the city of Rio were by 2021 being held in the Future Arena, which was also supposed to be dismantled after the Games, and the Olympic Golf Course. Returning mayor Eduardo Paes announced he would donate one to the city of Maricá. The three others, used in both the Parque dos Atletas and the Maria Lenk Aquatics Centre, were owned by the Brazilian Air Force and donated to a base in Guaratinguetá, the city of Salvador to create the Swimming Olympic Centre of Bahia, inaugurated in 2018, and the city of Manaus for an Olympic Centre, with the pool itself being reinaugurated in 2022. In 2022, parts of the Aquatics Stadium structure were donated to Bangu Atlético Clube, which expected to use them reforming their stadium, and to a samba school in the neighborhood of Lins de Vasconcelos. In 2024, the stadium was officially fully dismantled and its pools were donated to various projects around Rio. The main pool from the stadium was moved to Parque Oeste Ana Gonzaga in 2026.

== Gallery ==
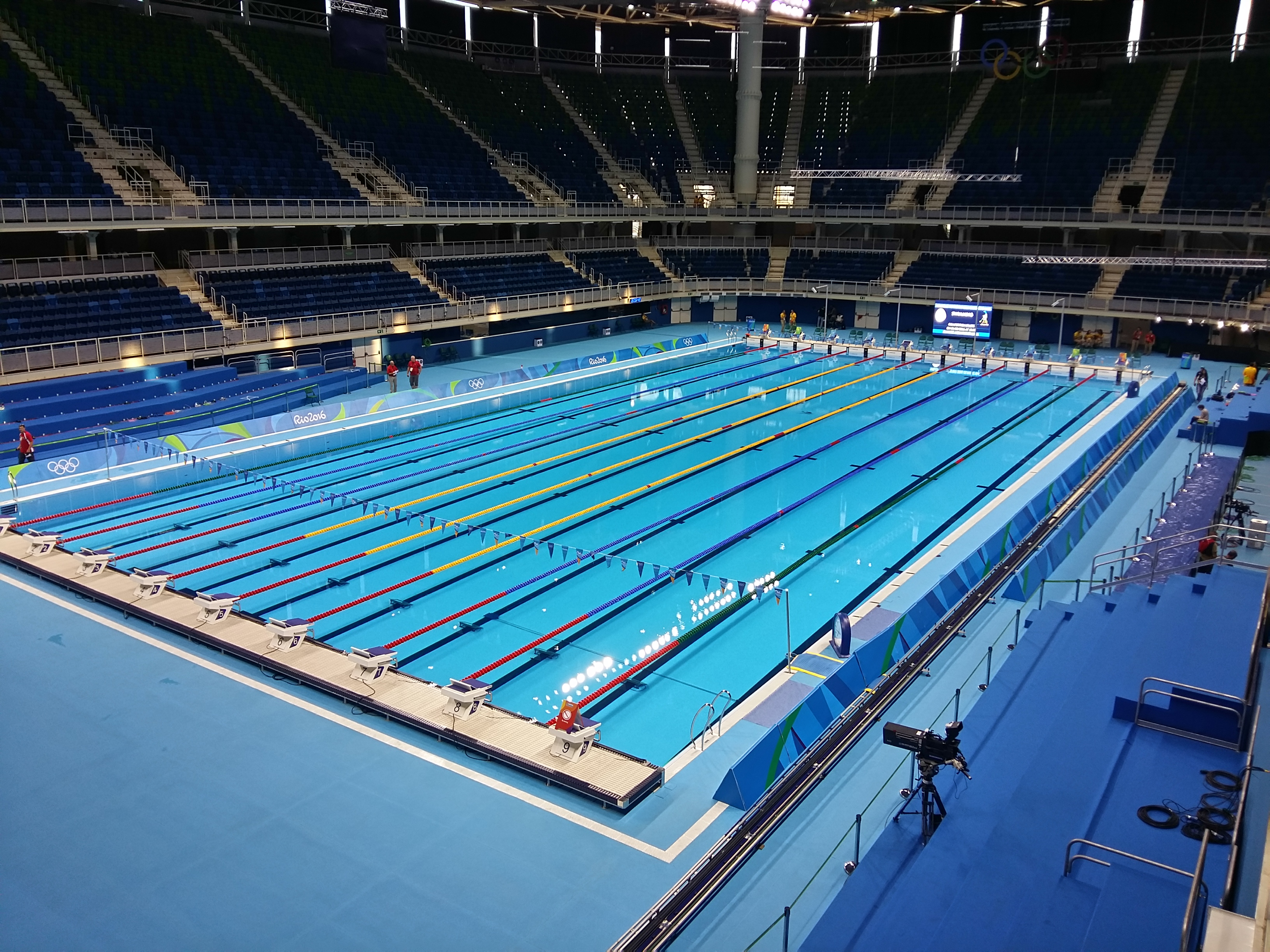
Inside the stadium

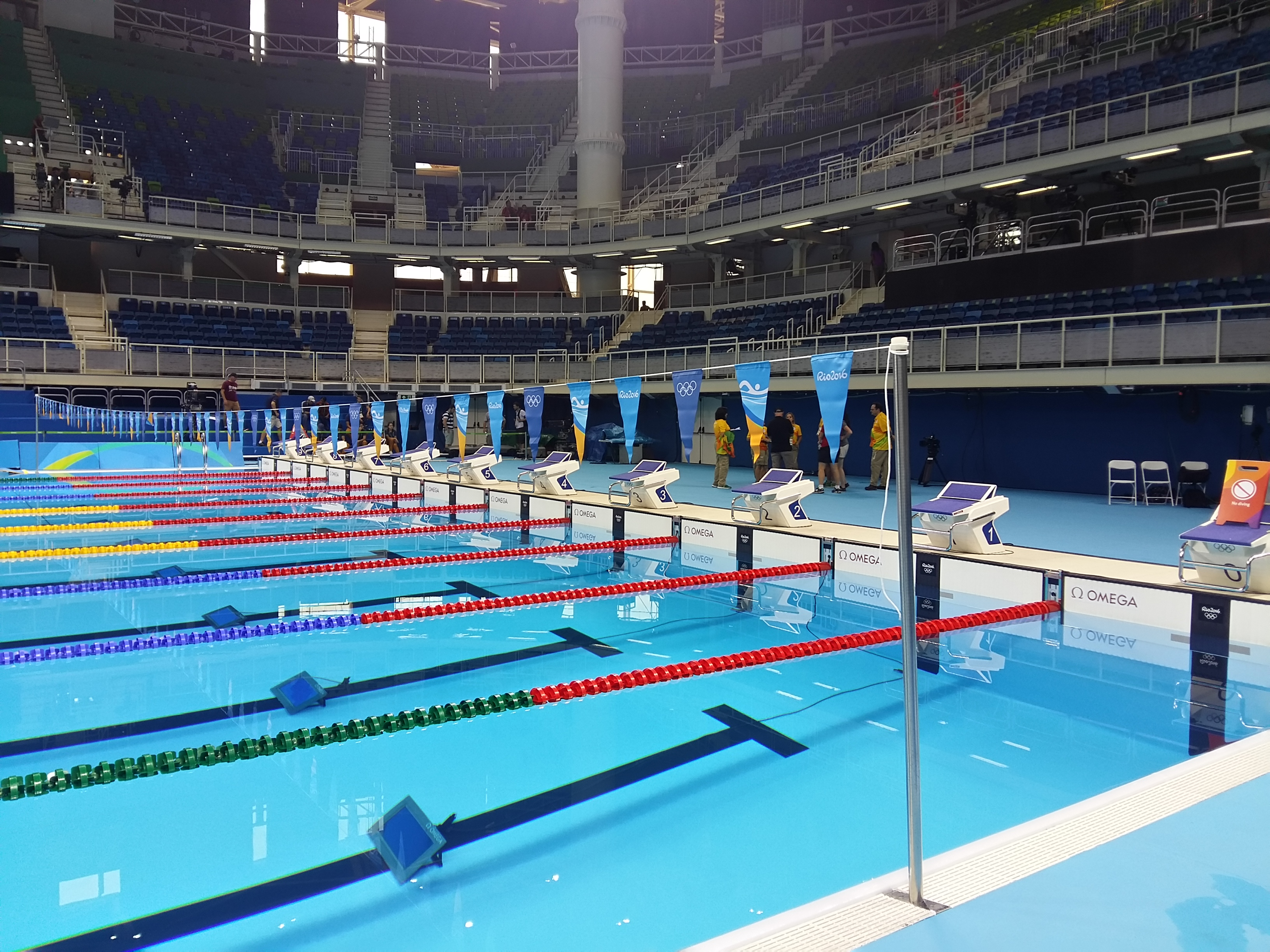
View of the competition pool

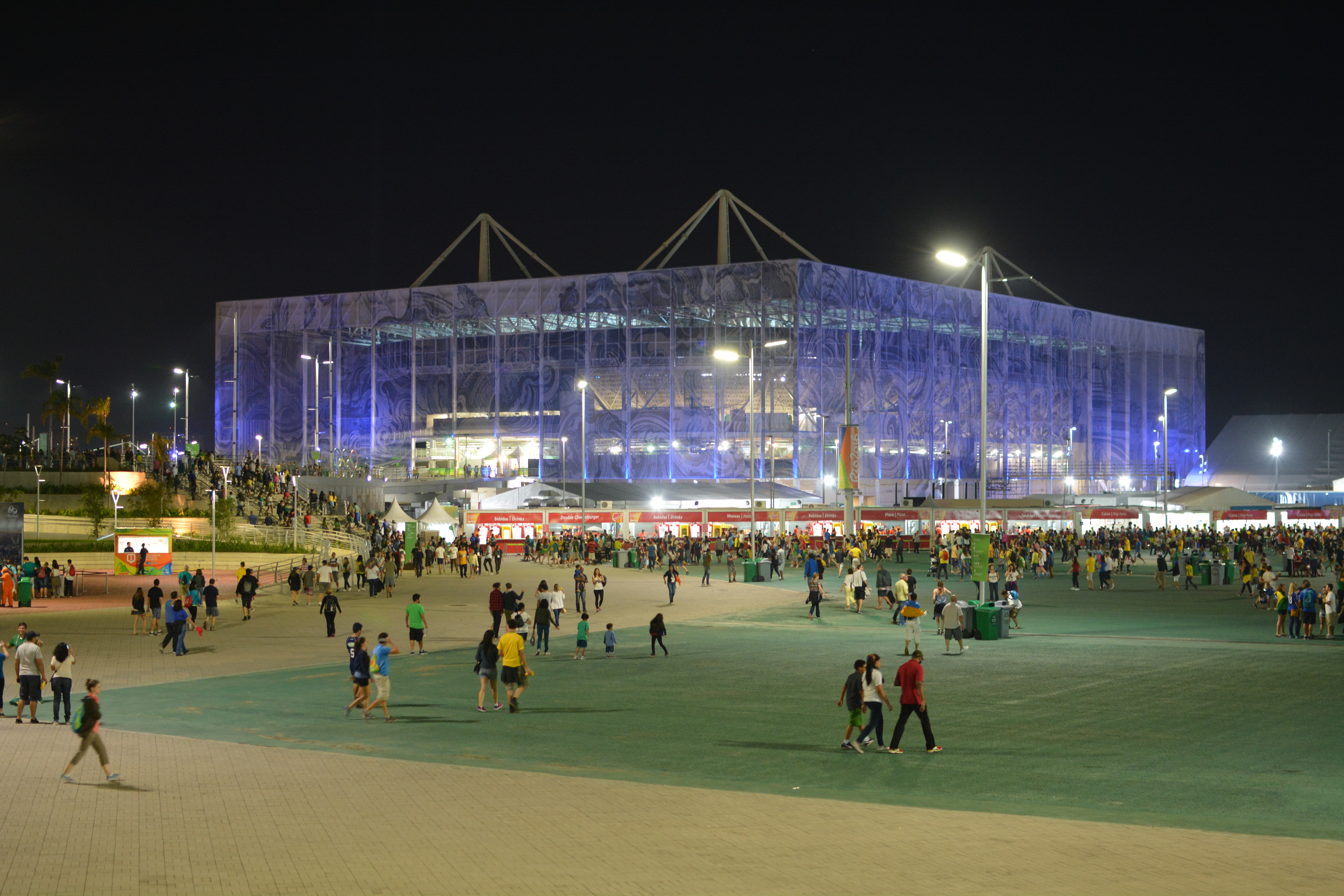
The stadium at night

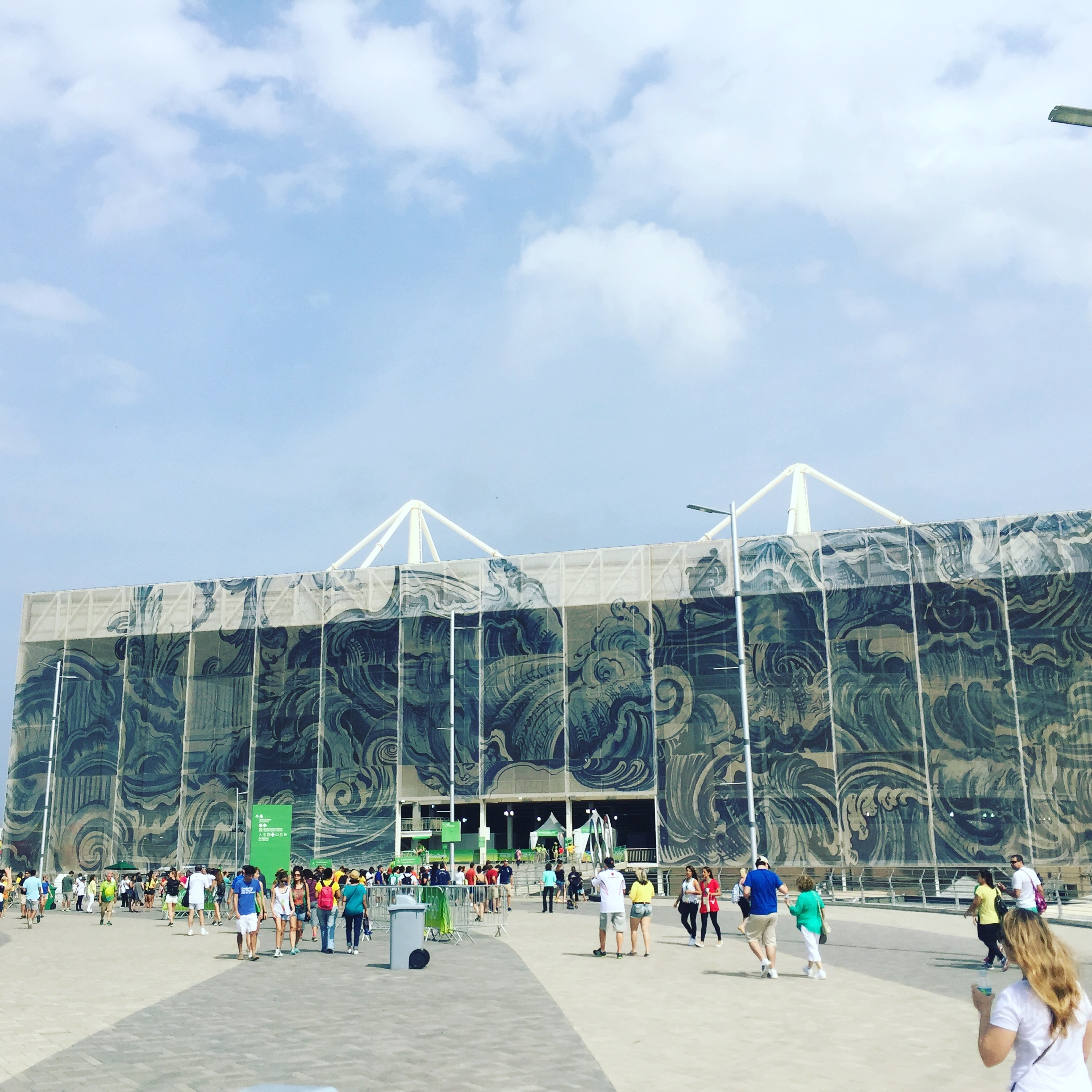
Stadium entrance
