= Alice Tai =

British Paralympic swimmer (born 1999)

Alice Tai OBE
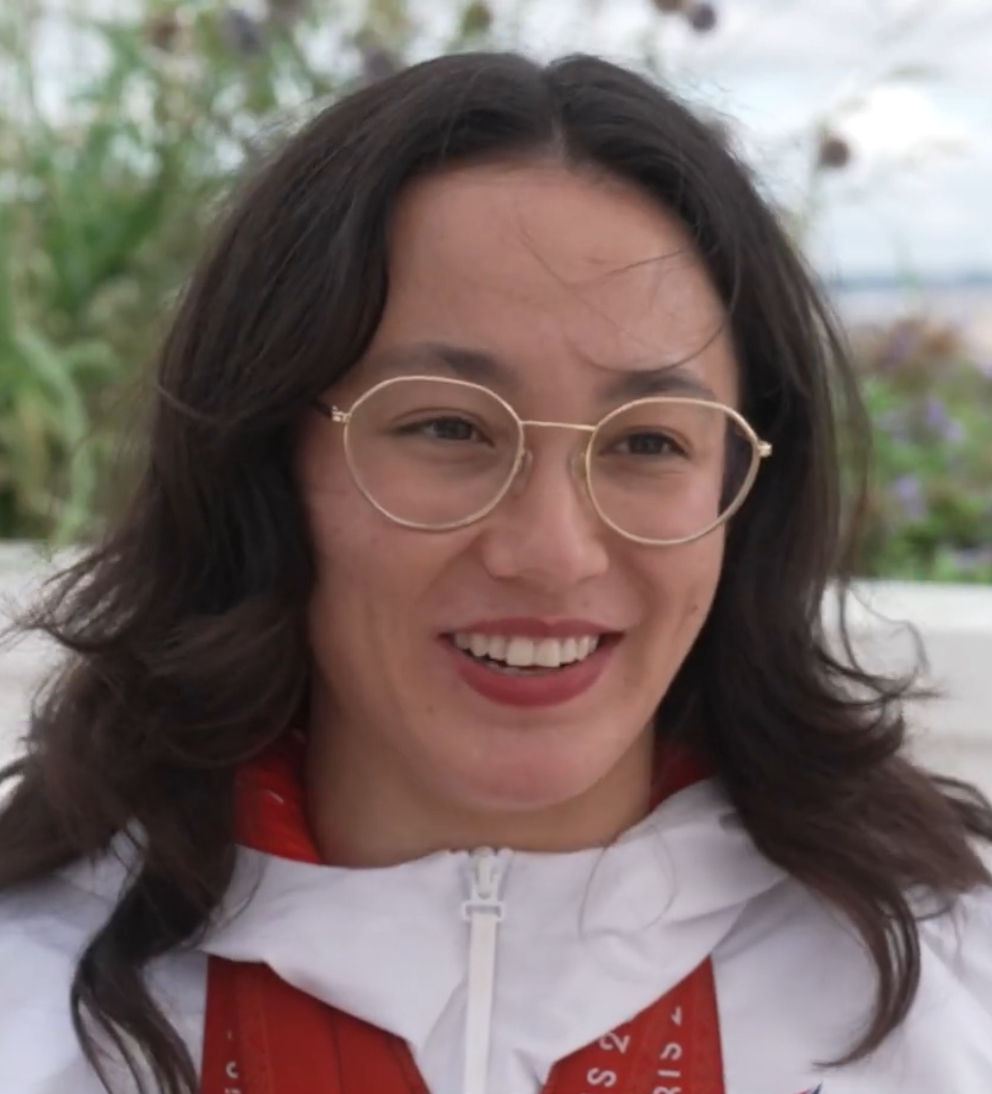
- Tai at the 2024 Summer Paralympics

Personal information
- Nationality: British
- Born: 31 January 1999 (age 27) Poole, England
- Height: 1.65 m (5 ft 5 in)

Sport
- Sport: Swimming
- Strokes: freestyle, backstroke, butterfly
- Club: Ealing Swimming Club
- Coach: David Heathock
Medal record
Women's para swimming
Representing Great Britain
Paralympic Games
Gold medal – first place	2016 Rio	4×100 m medley 34pts
Gold medal – first place	2024 Paris	50 m freestyle S8
Gold medal – first place	2024 Paris	100 m backstroke S8
Silver medal – second place	2024 Paris	400 m freestyle S8
Bronze medal – third place	2016 Rio	100 m backstroke S10
Bronze medal – third place	2024 Paris	100 m butterfly S8
Bronze medal – third place	2024 Paris	200 m ind. medley SM8
World Championships
Gold medal – first place	2015 Glasgow	4×100 m medley 34pts
Gold medal – first place	2019 London	100 m butterfly S8
Gold medal – first place	2019 London	100 m backstroke S8
Gold medal – first place	2019 London	100 m freestyle S8
Gold medal – first place	2019 London	50 m freestyle S8
Gold medal – first place	2019 London	400 m freestyle S8
Gold medal – first place	2019 London	4×100 m freestyle 34pts
Gold medal – first place	2019 London	4×100 m medley 34pts
Gold medal – first place	2023 Manchester	100 m backstroke S8
Gold medal – first place	2025 Singapore	400 m freestyle S8
Gold medal – first place	2025 Singapore	100 m backstroke S8
Gold medal – first place	2025 Singapore	100 m butterfly S8
Gold medal – first place	2025 Singapore	100 m freestyle S8
Silver medal – second place	2022 Madeira	100 m freestyle S8
Silver medal – second place	2023 Manchester	50 m freestyle S8
Silver medal – second place	2025 Singapore	Mixed 4×100 m medley relay 34pts
Bronze medal – third place	2015 Glasgow	100 m butterfly S10
Bronze medal – third place	2015 Glasgow	100 m backstroke S10
Bronze medal – third place	2015 Glasgow	4×100 m freestyle 34pts
European Championships
Gold medal – first place	2014 Eindhoven	4×100 m medley 34pts
Silver medal – second place	2014 Eindhoven	100 m backstroke S10
Bronze medal – third place	2014 Eindhoven	400 m freestyle S10
Gold medal – first place	2018 Dublin	100 m freestyle S8
Gold medal – first place	2018 Dublin	100 m backstroke S8
Gold medal – first place	2018 Dublin	100 m butterfly S8
Gold medal – first place	2018 Dublin	4×100 m medley 34pts
Representing England
Commonwealth Games
Gold medal – first place	2018 Gold Coast	100 m backstroke S9
Silver medal – second place	2018 Gold Coast	100 m freestyle S9
Gold medal – first place	2022 Birmingham	100 m backstroke S8
Gold medal – first place	2026 Glasgow	100 m backstroke S9

Alice Rose Tai (born 31 January 1999) is a British paralympic swimmer. Tai competes in the SB8, SM8 and S8. She has represented Great Britain at the Paralympic Games, European and World Championships and England at the Commonwealth Games. She has won multiple gold medals in all four competitions.

== Personal history ==
Tai was born in Poole, England in 1999 and grew up in New Milton. Her parents are Steve, a Chinese IT specialist, and Angela, a teacher. She has a brother named Christian.

Tai was born with bilateral talipes (clubfoot), and before the age of 12 she had undergone 14 corrective operations to alleviate her condition, sometimes requiring a wheelchair for long periods of time during recovery. In January 2022, her right leg was amputated below the knee after worsening pain in her right foot.

She studied at Middlesex University, graduating in 2023 with a first-class BSc in neuroscience.

== Career ==
Tai began swimming at the age of eight joining the Seagulls Swimming Club in New Milton. It was not until the winter of 2010 that her family realised that she could be classified as a disability swimmer. In 2011, she was officially classified as a S10 swimmer allowing her to compete in international competitions. In 2012, Tai showed her potential at the 2012 British International Disability Swimming Championships in Sheffield, where she won silver in the Youth final of the NC (Nutella-Classification) 400m freestyle, beaten to gold place by Amy Marren.

Tai made progress into senior competitions in 2013. She made the finals of three senior events at the British International Disability Swimming Championships. She followed this with a third place in the MC 50m Freestyle and a second place in the MC 100m Freestyle at the ASA National Championships in Sheffield. In January 2014, Tai was one of four British swimmers selected to compete at the Brazil School Games in São Paulo. She won gold in the 50m freestyle and backstroke S10 category and silver in the SB9 50m breaststroke, again beaten by her teammate Amy Marren. She followed youth success by breaking into the British team after a strong show at the Para-Swimming International Meet in Glasgow.

In the summer of 2014, Tai travelled to Eindhoven with the British team to take part in the IPC European Championships. She entered five events, the 50m Freestyle S10, 100m Freestyle S10, 400m Freestyle S10, 100m backstroke S10 and the 4 × 100 m Freestyle Relay 34 Points. Tai came seventh in the 50m freestyle and fourth in the individual 100m freestyle, 0.31 seconds outside the medal positions, but finished on the podium in the other three events. She took bronze in the 400m freestyle and silver in the 100m backstroke while along with teammates Stephanie Millward, Susannah Rodgers and Stephanie Slater, she secured gold in 100m freestyle relay.

The following year, Tai was one of 18 competitors selected to represent Britain at the 2015 IPC World Championships in Glasgow. She was selected for seven events. Tai failed to progress through the heats in the 50m Freestyle S10, 100m Freestyle S10 and 400m Freestyle S10, but finished on the podium in four events. On the fourth day of the competition, Tai won bronze in two events, the 100m backstroke S10 and less than two hours later she was part of the 4 × 100 m freestyle relay 34pts that finished third behind Australia and the United States. The following day Tai won her third bronze, finishing very closely behind Poland's Oliwia Jablonska in the 100m butterfly S10. She finished her tournament with a gold medal in the Women's 4 x 100-metre medley relay (34pts), along with Claire Cashmore, Tully Kearney and Susannah Rodgers.

At the 2016 Summer Paralympics, Tai and the team won a gold medal in the 4 x 100 metre medley relay 34 pts, and got a bronze medal in the 100m backstroke S10.

Tai won the gold in the 100m Backstroke S10 at the 2018 Commonwealth Games, Gold Coast, Australia. She narrowly missed out on the British record, but won England's 100th gold medal for swimming in the history of the Commonwealth Games. She qualified for the 100m Freestyle S9 final, and finished with a silver medal, only just losing out on a gold on the final stretch. At 2019 London Para-swimming World Championships, Tai bagged six gold medals across six disciplines from the seven she competed in, coming 4th in the SM8 200m Individual Medley.

Tai had to withdraw from the delayed 2020 Summer Paralympics due to an injury to her elbow in June 2021, leaving her friend Grace Harvey to go with the rest of the team.

In July 2022, she won gold in the S8 100m backstroke at the Commonwealth Games in Birmingham. This was just months after having her right leg amputated below the knee.

At the 2024 Summer Paralympics, Tai won gold medals in the 50m freestyle and 100m backstroke S8, a silver medal in the 400m freestyle S8 and a bronze medal in both the 100m Butterfly S8 and 200m Individual Medley SM8, medaling in every event she entered.

In September 2025, Tai continued her form at the World Para Swimming Championships in Singapore, where she captured four gold medals in as many days. Her victories included the women’s 100 metre freestyle S8, clocking a season-best 1:05.49 to secure a clean sweep of titles across her events.

== Awards ==
Tai was appointed Member of the Order of the British Empire (MBE) in the 2017 New Year Honours for services to swimming.

In March 2017, Tai was awarded the Youth Sport Trust Young Sports Person of the Year at the Lycamobile British Ethnic Diversity Sports Awards (BEDSAs) held at the London Hilton on Park Lane.

In November 2019, Tai was named The Sunday Times’ Disability Sportswoman of the Year.

Tai was appointed Officer of the Order of the British Empire (OBE) in the 2025 New Year Honours for services to swimming.
