= Andrei Gladkov =

Russian Paralympic swimmer (born 1997)

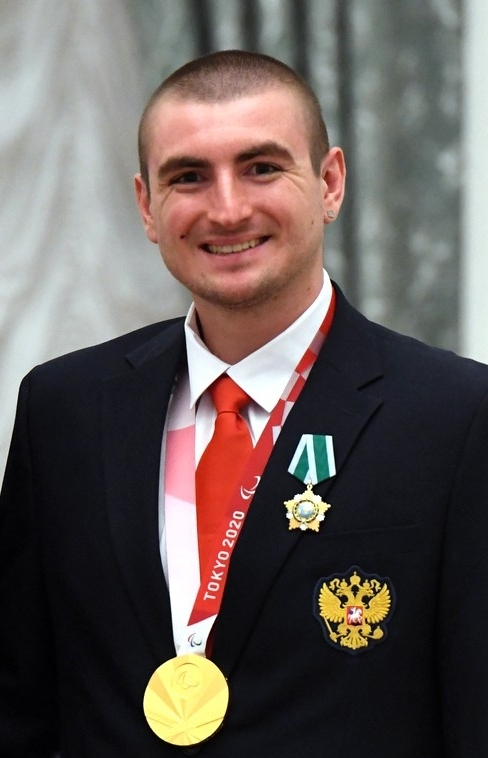
- Gladkov in 2021

Personal information
- Full name: Andrei Nikolaevich Gladkov
- Nationality: Russian
- Born: 24 March 1997 (age 29) Volgograd, Russia
- Education: Volgograd State Academy of Physical Education

Sport
- Sport: Paralympic swimming
- Disability class: S7
- Club: Volgograd Regional Centre of Adaptive Sports
- Coached by: Nikolay Biryukov
Medal record
Representing RPC
Paralympic Games
Gold medal – first place	2020 Tokyo	4x100 m medley relay 34pts
Representing Russia
Paralympic Games
Silver medal – second place	2012 London	4×100 m medley relay 34pts
Bronze medal – third place	2012 London	4×100 m relay 34pts
Bronze medal – third place	2012 London	400 m freestyle S7
World Championships
Silver medal – second place	2019 London	100 m backstroke S7
Gold medal – first place	2015 Glasgow	4x100 m medley relay 34pts
Gold medal – first place	2015 Glasgow	400 m freestyle S7
Gold medal – first place	2015 Glasgow	100 m backstroke S7
Bronze medal – third place	2015 Glasgow	200 m medley SM7

Andrei Nikolaevich Gladkov (Russian: Андрей Николаевич Гладков; born 24 March 1997), is a Russian Paralympic swimmer. Gladkov has won three gold medals at the 2015 World Championships and one gold medal at the 2020 Summer Paralympics.

== Paralympics ==
Gladkov represented Russia at the 2012 Summer Paralympics and won a silver medal and two bronze medals. He represented Russian Paralympic Committee athletes at the 2020 Summer Paralympics and won a gold medal in the men's 4 × 100 metre medley relay 34pts event.

== Personal life ==
Gladkov is married to Daria, and has a son Mark.
