= 2015 IPC Swimming World Championships – Men's 50 metre breaststroke =

The men's 50 metre breaststroke at the 2015 IPC Swimming World Championships was held at the Tollcross International Swimming Centre in Glasgow, United Kingdom from 13–17 July.

== Medalists ==
Event	Gold		Silver		Bronze	
SB2	Somchai Doungkaew; Thailand	59.62	Arnulfo Orena; Mexico	1:00.41	Ioannis Kostakis; Greece	1:00.56
SB3	Miguel Luque; Spain	50.13	Takayuki Suzuki; Japan	50.51	Aleksei Lyzhikhin; Russia	51.01

Legend
WR: World record, CR: Championship record, AF: Africa record, AM: Americas record, AS: Asian record, EU: European record, OS: Oceania record

== See also ==
- List of IPC world records in swimming
