= Phelipe Rodrigues =

Brazilian Paralympic swimmer

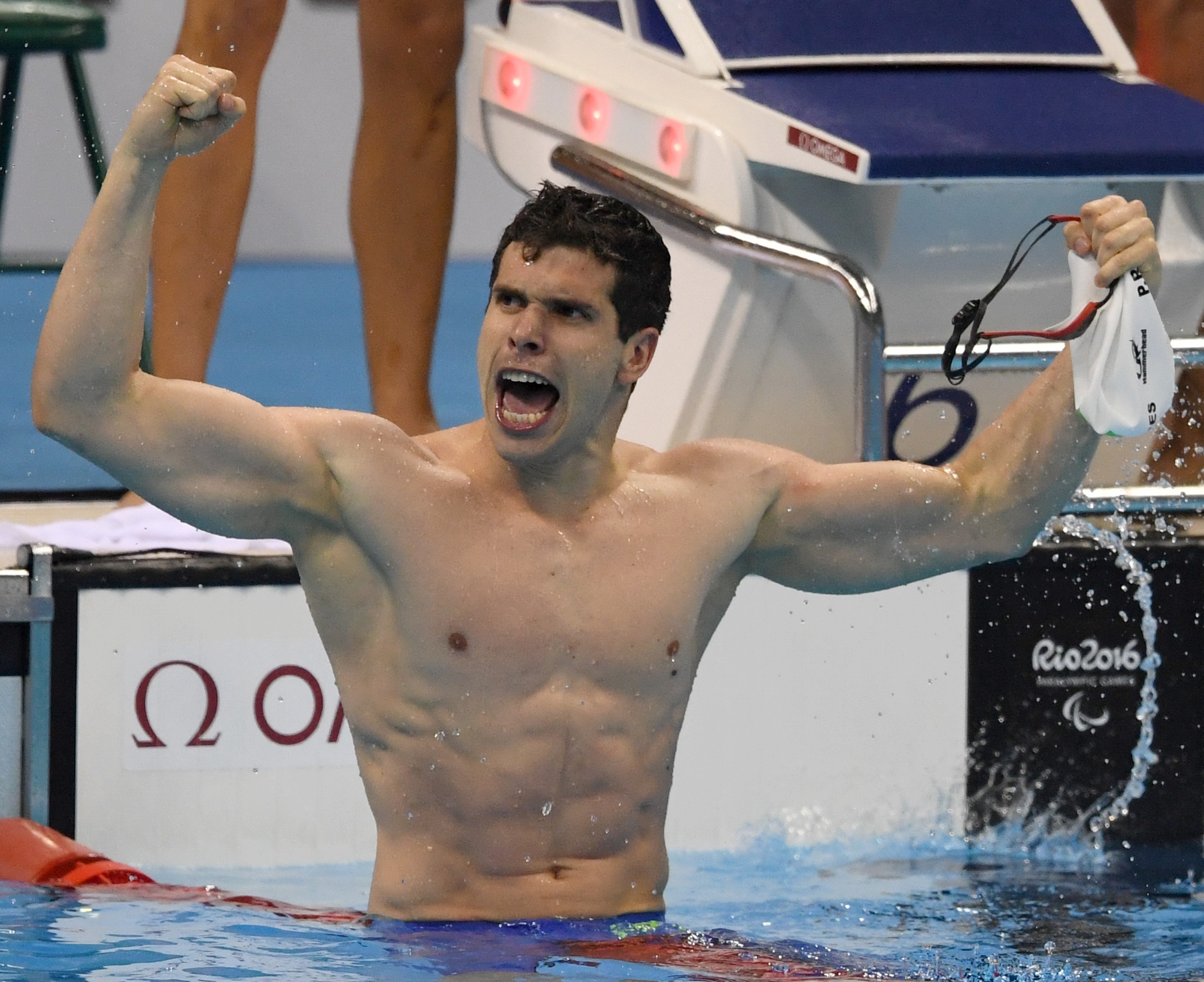
- Rodrigues at the 2016 Paralympics

Personal information
- Born: 10 August 1990 (age 35) Recife, Brazil

Sport
- Sport: Swimming
- Disability class: S10
- Event(s): Freestyle, butterfly
Medal record
Men's swimming
Representing Brazil
Paralympic Games
Silver medal – second place	2008 Beijing	50 m freestyle S10
Silver medal – second place	2008 Beijing	100 m freestyle S10
Silver medal – second place	2012 London	100 m freestyle S10
Silver medal – second place	2016 Rio	50 m freestyle S10
Silver medal – second place	2016 Rio	4×100 m freestyle 34pts
Silver medal – second place	2024 Paris	50 m freestyle S10
Bronze medal – third place	2016 Rio	100 m freestyle S10
Bronze medal – third place	2016 Rio	4×100 m medley 34pts
Bronze medal – third place	2020 Tokyo	50 m freestyle S10
World Championships
Gold medal – first place	2017 Mexico City	50 m freestyle S10
Gold medal – first place	2017 Mexico City	4x100 m freestyle relay
Gold medal – first place	2017 Mexico City	4x100 m medley relay
Silver medal – second place	2010 Eindhoven	4x100 m freestyle relay
Silver medal – second place	2013 Montreal	4x100 m freestyle relay
Silver medal – second place	2013 Montreal	50 m freestyle S10
Silver medal – second place	2013 Montreal	100 m freestyle S10
Silver medal – second place	2015 Glasgow	50 m freestyle S10
Silver medal – second place	2015 Glasgow	100 m freestyle S10
Silver medal – second place	2015 Glasgow	4×100 m freestyle 34pts
Silver medal – second place	2017 Mexico City	100 m freestyle S10
Silver medal – second place	2019 London	50 m freestyle S10
Silver medal – second place	2022 Madeira	50 m freestyle S10
Bronze medal – third place	2010 Eindhoven	50 m freestyle S10
Bronze medal – third place	2010 Eindhoven	100 m freestyle S10
Bronze medal – third place	2013 Montreal	100 m freestyle S10
Bronze medal – third place	2017 Mexico City	100 m butterfly S10
Bronze medal – third place	2022 Madeira	100 m freestyle S10
Parapan American Games
Gold medal – first place	2011 Guadalajara	4x100 m freestyle relay
Gold medal – first place	2011 Guadalajara	4x100 m medley relay
Gold medal – first place	2015 Toronto	50 m freestyle S10
Gold medal – first place	2015 Toronto	4x100 m freestyle relay
Gold medal – first place	2015 Toronto	4x100 m medley relay
Gold medal – first place	2019 Lima	50 m freestyle S10
Gold medal – first place	2019 Lima	100 m freestyle S10
Gold medal – first place	2019 Lima	400 m freestyle S10
Gold medal – first place	2019 Lima	100 m butterfly S10
Gold medal – first place	2019 Lima	200 m medley SM10
Gold medal – first place	2019 Lima	4x100 m freestyle relay
Gold medal – first place	2019 Lima	4x100 m medley relay
Gold medal – first place	2023 Santiago	100 m butterfly S10
Gold medal – first place	2023 Santiago	50 m freestyle S10
Gold medal – first place	2023 Santiago	100 m freestyle S10
Gold medal – first place	2023 Santiago	4x100 m freestyle relay
Silver medal – second place	2011 Guadalajara	50m freestyle S10
Silver medal – second place	2011 Guadalajara	100 m freestyle S10
Silver medal – second place	2011 Guadalajara	400 m freestyle S10
Silver medal – second place	2015 Toronto	100 m freestyle S10
Bronze medal – third place	2019 Lima	100 m backstroke S10
Bronze medal – third place	2023 Santiago	200 m medley SM10

Phelipe Andrews Melo Rodrigues (born 10 August 1990) is a paralympic swimmer from Brazil competing mainly in category S10 events. He was born with a club foot and had two surgeries when he was just four weeks old. After his second surgery when his foot was in the right position he had an infection which made his leg blow the knee and specially his tendon to stop growing, disabling his right foot movements. He started swimming when he was 8 months as physiotherapy. He also tried many different sports but his passion since childhood was swimming.

== First competitions ==
His first competitions was for "Academia Movimento" located in Olinda-PE, he competed for 4 years for his team, in 2007 he moved to João Pessoa - PB and joined the state team C.I.E.F. where he archived regional gold medals and twice 3rd place at nationals competitions with able bodied swimmers (non-disabled).

== Paralympic sports ==
Phelipe was part of the Brazilian team that travelled to Beijing for the 2008 Summer Paralympics. There he competed in the 100-metre and 50-metre freestyle events where he won silver behind compatriot Andre Brasil. He also swam 400-metre freestyle where he failed to make the final, and competed as part of the Brazilian 4 × 100 m freestyle and 4 × 100 m medley teams but even with the gold and silver medal-winning S10 swimmers Brazil could not manage to win a medal finishing fourth and eighth respectively. On his next Paralympic Game at London 2012 he archived another silver medal in the 100-metre freestyle, fourth place in the 50-metre freestyle event which gave him a medal in Beijing 2008 and fifth in the 100-metre butterfly.

He also participated in the Para-Panamerican Games in Guadalajara - Mexico in 2011 where he took 5 medals, 3 silver medals (50m,100m, 400m freestyle) and 2 gold medals (4 × 100 m freestyle and 4 × 100 m medley).

Following the 2012 Paralympics Rodrigues accepted an invitation to train in Manchester, where he stayed until the end of 2014 before returning to Brazil.

At the 2016 Rio Paralympics Rodrigues won two silver and two bronze medals.

== Progression ==
Events	2008	2010	2011	2012	2013	2014
50m freestyle	24.64	24.63	24.24	23.99	23.89	23.47
100m freestyle	54.22	53.59	53.05	52.42	53.40	51.84
100m butterfly	1.04,39	1.02.41	1.00.83	58.79	59.73	----
