= Dmytro Vanzenko =

Ukrainian Paralympic swimmer (born 1996)

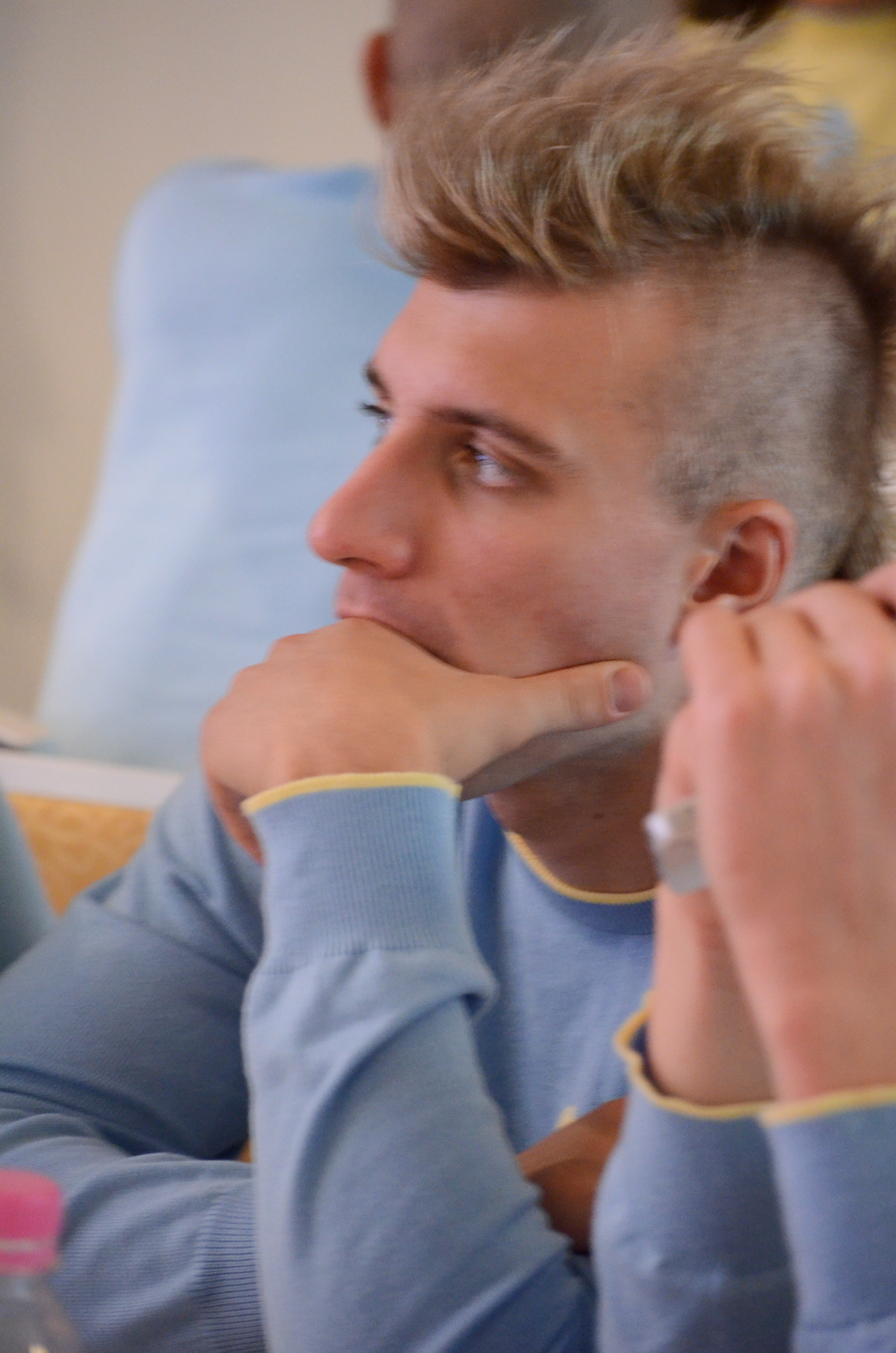
- Vanzenko in October 2016

Personal information
- Full name: Dmytro Volodymyrovych Vanzenko
- Nationality: Ukrainian
- Born: 10 July 1996 (age 30) Donetsk, Ukraine

Sport
- Sport: Swimming
- Strokes: Freestyle, backstroke, butterfly
Medal record
Men's para swimming
Representing Ukraine
Summer Paralympics
Bronze medal – third place	2016 Rio de Janeiro	200 m medley SM10

Dmytro Volodymyrovych Vanzenko (Ukrainian: Дмитро Володимирович Ванзенко, born 10 July 1996) is a Ukrainian Paralympic swimmer who competes in S10 and SM10 (individual medley) events. He is represented by Donetsk and Dnipropetrovsk Regional Centers for Physical Culture and Sports of Disabled Persons "Invasport".

== Career ==
At the 2014 European Championships, Vanzenko won a silver medal at the men's 4 × 100 metre freestyle relay and bronze medal in the 200 m individual medley. At the 2015 World Championships, he competed in the 400 m freestyle, 200 m medley, and 4 × 100 m medley relay, winning the bronze medal in each of them. He made his Paralympic debut at the 2016 Summer Paralympics, where he won the bronze medal in the 200 m medley SM10.

== Recognition ==
On 4 October 2016, Vanzenko was awarded with the 3rd degree Order for Courage by Petro Poroshenko, the President of Ukraine.
