= 2015 IPC Swimming World Championships – Women's 200 metre individual medley =

The women's 200 metre individual medley at the 2015 IPC Swimming World Championships was held at the Tollcross International Swimming Centre in Glasgow, United Kingdom from 13–17 July.

== Medalists ==
Event	Gold		Silver		Bronze	
SM5	Sarah Louise Rung; Norway	3:19.83 CR	Inbal Pezaro; Israel	3:36.23	Teresa Perales; Spain	3:41.18
SM6	Ellie Simmonds; Great Britain	3:01.02 WR	Yelyzaveta Mereshko; Ukraine	3:06.08	Verena Schott; Germany	3:12.32
SM7	Nikita Howarth; New Zealand	2:59.85	Tess Routliffe; Canada	3:04.75	Cortney Jordan; United States	3:06.90
SM8	Jessica Long; United States	2:40.08	Olesia Vladykina; Russia	2:41.06	Weiyuan Lu; China	2:52.62
SM9	Tully Kearney; Great Britain	2:31.08 EU	Lin Ping; China	2:38.91 AS	Ellen Keane; Ireland	2:40.31
SM10	Sophie Pascoe; New Zealand	2:26.51 CR	Aurelie Rivard; Canada	2:30.35	Zhang Meng; China	2:32.02
SM11	Mary Fisher; New Zealand	2:52.46	Daniela Schulte; Germany	2:52.57	Maja Reichard; Sweden	2:59.10
SM13	Rebecca Meyers (SM13); United States	2:24.60 WR	Darya Stukalova (SM12); Russia	2:24.86 WR	Anna Stetsenko (SM13); Ukraine	2:28.71EU
SM14	Valeriia Shabalina; Russia	2:21.33 WR	Jessica-Jane Applegate; Great Britain	2:25.78	Marlou van der Kulk; Netherlands	2:28.65

Legend
WR: World record, CR: Championship record, AF: Africa record, AM: Americas record, AS: Asian record, EU: European record, OS: Oceania record

== See also ==
- List of IPC world records in swimming
