= 2015 IPC Swimming World Championships – Men's 200 metre individual medley =

The men's 200 metre individual medley at the 2015 IPC Swimming World Championships was held at the Tollcross International Swimming Centre in Glasgow, United Kingdom from 13–17 July.

== Medalists ==
Event	Gold		Silver		Bronze	
SM6	Sascha Kindred; Great Britain	2:41.41 CR	Nelson Crispín; Colombia	2:41.84 AM	Talisson Glock; Brazil	2:41.87
SM7	Yevheniy Bohodayko; Ukraine	2:34.46 CR	Matthew Levy; Australia	2:38.12	Andrei Gladkov; Russia	2:40.45
SM8	Oliver Hynd; Great Britain	2:22.40 EU	Konstantin Lisenkov; Russia	2:26.62	Song Maodang; China	2:26.89
SM9	Federico Morlacchi; Italy	2:17.76	Andrei Kalina; Russia	2:18.38	Tamas Toth; Hungary	2:21.46
SM10	Denys Dubrov; Ukraine	2:11.94 EU	Benoit Huot; Canada	2:12.50	Dmytro Vanzenko; Ukraine	2:14.00
SM11	Oleksandr Mashchenko; Ukraine	2:29.62	Israel Oliver; Spain	2:30.63	Keiichi Kimura; Japan	2:31.13
SM13	Ihar Boki; Belarus	2:04.06	Iaroslav Denyenko; Ukraine	2:08.58	Dzmitry Salei; Azerbaijan	2:11.33
SM14	Viacheslav Emeliantsev; Russia	2:08.98 WR	Marc Evers; Netherlands	2:10.38	Mikhail Kuliabin; Russia	2:15.81

Legend
WR: World record, CR: Championship record, AF: Africa record, AM: Americas record, AS: Asian record, EU: European record, OS: Oceania record

== See also ==
- List of IPC world records in swimming
