= 2015 IPC Swimming World Championships – Men's 100 metre freestyle =

The men's 100 metre freestyle at the 2015 IPC Swimming World Championships was held at the Tollcross International Swimming Centre in Glasgow, United Kingdom from 13–17 July.

== Medalists ==
Event	Gold		Silver		Bronze	
S4	Jo Giseong; South Korea	1:22.85 CR	Roman Zhdanov; Russia	1:23.92	David Smetanine; France	1:27.24
S5	Daniel Dias; Brazil	1:08.85 CR	Roy Perkins; United States	1:15.96	Andrew Mullen; Great Britain	1:16.68
S6	Nelson Crispín; Colombia	1:06.60 AM	Oleksandr Komarov; Ukraine	1:07.81	Sebastian Iwanow; Germany	1:09.18
S7	Pan Shiyun; China	1:01.53 CR	Matthew Levy; Australia	1:02.51	Sergey Sukharev; Russia	1:03.27
S8	Denis Tarasov; Russia	55.85 WR	Wang Yinan; China	57.28	Konstantin Lisenkov; Russia	58.48
S9	Alexander Skaliukh; Russia	56.97	Federico Morlacchi; Italy	57.29	Brenden Hall; Australia	57.51
S10	Andre Brasil; Brazil	51.15	Phelipe Rodrigues; Brazil	52.25	Nathan Stein; Canada	53.29
S11	Bradley Snyder; United States	56.78 CR	Matheus Rheine; Brazil	59.20	Hendri Herbst; South Africa	1:00.35
S13	Ihar Boki; Belarus	50.85 WR	Iaroslav Denysenko; Ukraine	51.85	Aleksandr Golintovskii; Russia	53.19

Legend
WR: World record, CR: Championship record, AF: Africa record, AM: Americas record, AS: Asian record, EU: European record, OS: Oceania record

== See also ==
- List of IPC world records in swimming
