= 2015 IPC Swimming World Championships – Women's 100 metre freestyle =

The women's 100 metre freestyle at the 2015 IPC Swimming World Championships was held at the Tollcross International Swimming Centre in Glasgow, United Kingdom from 13–17 July.

== Medalists ==
| Event | Gold | | Silver | | Bronze | |
|---|---|---|---|---|---|---|
| S3 | Lisette Teunissen; Netherlands | 1:37.18 WR | Olga Sviderska; Ukraine | 1:39.69 | Zulfiya Gabidullina; Kazakhstan | 1:46.11 |
| S5 | Teresa Perales; Spain | 1:21.77 | Sarah Louise Rung; Norway | 1:22.84 | Joana Maria Silva; Brazil | 1:24.01 AM |
| S6 | Yelyzaveta Mereshko; Ukraine | 1:12.21 WR | Viktoriia Savtsova; Ukraine | 1:13.44 | Tiffany Thomas Kane; Australia | 1:15.05 OC |
| S7 | Cortney Jordan; United States | 1:11.93 | Ani Palian; Russia | 1:12:98 | Susie Rodgers; United Kingdom | 1:13.10 |
| S8 | Maddison Elliott; Australia | 1:04.71 WR | Jessica Long; United States | 1:06.95 | Lakeisha Patterson; Australia | 1:08.05 |
| S9 | Ellie Cole; Australia | 1:02.78 | Michelle Konkoly; United States | 1:03.25 | Nuria Marques Soto; Spain | 1:04.46 |
| S10 | Sophie Pascoe; New Zealand | 1:00.16 | Aurelie Rivard; Canada | 1:00.25 AM | Summer Mortimer; Netherlands | 1:01.24 |
| S11 | Mary Fisher; New Zealand | 1:10.30 | Daniela Schulte; Germany | 1:11.33 | Li Guizhi; China | 1:11.74 |
| S13 | Anna Stetsenko (S13); Ukraine | 58.91 CR | Hannah Russell (S12); Great Britain | 59.26 CR | Darya Stukalova (S12); Russia | 59.44 |

Legend
WR: World record, CR: Championship record, AF: Africa record, AM: Americas record, AS: Asian record, EU: European record, OS: Oceania record

== See also ==
- List of IPC world records in swimming
