= 2015 IPC Swimming World Championships – Men's 4 × 100 metre freestyle relay =

The Men's 100 metre x 4 freestyle at the 2015 IPC Swimming World Championships was held at the Tollcross International Swimming Centre in Glasgow, United Kingdom from 13–17 July.

As with other disability relay events, the freestyle works on a points system whereby the classification numbers of each swimmer are totaled to give a number no higher than 34.

== Medalists ==
Event	Gold		Silver		Bronze	
34pts	Konstantin Lisenkov (S8); Andrei Kalina (S9); Alexander Skaliukh (S9); Denis Tarasov (S8); Russia	3:48.10 WR	Daniel Dias (S5); Andre Brasil (S10); Ruiter Silva (S9); Phelipe Rodrigues (S10); Brazil	3:51.44 AM	Brenden Hall (S9); Blake Cochrane (S8); Matthew Levy (S7); Guy Harrison-Murray (S10); Australia	3:56.26

Legend
WR: World record, CR: Championship record, AF: Africa record, AM: Americas record, AS: Asian record, EU: European record, OS: Oceania record

== See also ==
- List of IPC world records in swimming
