= 2015 IPC Swimming World Championships – Men's 100 metre backstroke =

The men's 100 metre backstroke at the 2015 IPC Swimming World Championships was held at the Tollcross International Swimming Centre in Glasgow, United Kingdom from 13–17 July.

== Medalists ==
Event	Gold		Silver		Bronze	
S1	Hennadii Boiko; Ukraine	2:29.82	Anton Kol; Ukraine	2:36.11	Christos Tampaxis; Greece	2:54.45
S2	Serhii Palamarchuk; Ukraine	2:08.31	Dmitrii Kokarev; Russia	2:10.12	Jacek Czech; Poland	2:10.77
S6	Zheng Tao; China	1:12.94 WR	Talisson Glock; Brazil	1:13.52 AM	Iaroslav Semenenko; Ukraine	1:14.93
S7	Andrei Gladkov; Russia	1:09.07	Marian Kvasnytsia; Ukraine	1:13.16	Italo Pereira; Brazil	1:15.00
S8	Konstantin Lisenkov; Russia	1:05.81	Iurii Bozhynskyi; Ukraine	1:05.94	Oliver Hynd; Great Britain	1:06.08
S9	Brenden Hall; Australia	1:05.01	James Crisp; Great Britain	1:05.12	Tamas Toth; Hungary	1:05.24
S10	Andre Brasil; Brazil	59.95 CR	Olivier van de Voort; Netherlands	1:00.62	Benoit Huot; Canada	1:01.63
S11	Dmytro Zalevskyy; Ukraine	1:08.42CR	Viktor Smyrnov; Ukraine	1:09.59	Wojciech Artur Makowski; Poland	1:11.83
S12	Aleksandr Nevolin-Svetov; Russia	1:00.62	Sergii Klippert; Ukraine	1:01.28	Tucker Dupree; United States	1:01.36
S13	Ihar Boki; Belarus	56.74 WR	Iaroslav Denysenko; Ukraine	59.08	Sean Russo; Australia	1:01.10
S14	Viacheslav Emeliantsev; Belarus	59.26 WR	Lee Inkook; South Korea	59.88	Marc Evers; Netherlands	1:00.42

Legend
WR: World record, CR: Championship record, AF: Africa record, AM: Americas record, AS: Asian record, EU: European record, OS: Oceania record

== See also ==
- List of IPC world records in swimming
