= 2015 IPC Swimming World Championships – Women's 100 metre backstroke =

The women's 100 metre backstroke at the 2015 IPC Swimming World Championships was held at the Tollcross International Swimming Centre in Glasgow, United Kingdom from 13–17 July.

== Medalists ==
Event	Gold		Silver		Bronze	
S2	Iryna Sotska (S2); Ukraine	2:17.13	Alexandra Agafonova (S2); Russia	2:28.43	Ingrid Thunem (S1); Norway	2:37.52
S6	Lu Dong; China	1:25.81 CR	Oksana Khrul; Ukraine	1:26.83	Anastasia Diodorova; Russia	1:27.75
S7	Zhang Ying; China	1:23.33 AS	Rebecca Dubber; New Zealand	1:23.98	Cortney Jordan; United States	1:24.90
S8	Maddison Elliott; Australia	1:17.93	Jessica Long; United States	1:19.07	Olesia Vladykina; Russia	1:19.79
S9	Ellie Cole; Australia	1:08.67 WR	Tully Kearney; Great Britain	1:10.52	Nuria Marques Soto; Spain	1:10.68
S10	Summer Mortimer; Netherlands	1:06.05	Sophie Pascoe; New Zealand	1:07.51	Alice Tai; Great Britain	1:08.46
S11	Mary Fisher; New Zealand	1:19.77 CR	Daniela Schulte; Germany	1:21.33	Maryna Piddubna; Ukraine	1:25.18
S12	Darya Stukalova; Russia	1:06.75 CR	Hannah Russell; Great Britain	1:06.79	Maria Delgado Nadal; Spain	1:14.51
S13	Anna Krivshina; Russia	1:07.78	Anna Stetsenko; Ukraine	1:09.68	Colleen Young; United States	1:12.88
S14	Jessica-Jane Applegate; Great Britain	1:06.75	Valeriia Shabalina; Russia	1:06.80	Taylor Corry; Australia	1:09.52

Legend
WR: World record, CR: Championship record, AF: Africa record, AM: Americas record, AS: Asian record, EU: European record, OS: Oceania record

== See also ==
- List of IPC world records in swimming
