= 2015 IPC Swimming World Championships – Men's 100 metre butterfly =

The men's 100 metre butterfly at the 2015 IPC Swimming World Championships was held at the Tollcross International Swimming Centre in Glasgow, United Kingdom from 13 to 17 July.

== Medalists ==
| Event | Gold | | Silver | | Bronze | |
|---|---|---|---|---|---|---|
| S8 | Denis Tarasov; Russia | 1:01.05 | Charles Rozoy; France | 1:02.63 | Luis Armando Andrade Guillen; Mexico | 1:03.92 |
| S9 | Alexander Skaliukh; Russia | 59.62 | Federico Morlacchi; Italy | 59.69 | Kristijan Vincetic; Croatia | 1:00.74 |
| S10 | Denys Dubrov; Ukraine | 56.43 EU | Andre Brasil; Brazil | 56.67 | Dmitry Grigoryev; Russia | 57.55 |
| S11 | Keiichi Kimura; Japan | 1:02.98 CR | Oleksandr Mashchenko; Ukraine | 1:03.05 | Israel Oliver; Spain | 1:04.24 |
| S13 | Ihar Boki; Belarus | 54.44 WR | Roman Makarov; Russia | 57.52 | Timothy Antalfy; Australia | 57.58 |

Legend
WR: World record, CR: Championship record, AF: Africa record, AM: Americas record, AS: Asian record, EU: European record, OS: Oceania record

== See also ==
- List of IPC world records in swimming
