= 2015 IPC Swimming World Championships – Men's 200 metre freestyle =

The men's 200 metre freestyle at the 2015 IPC Swimming World Championships was held at the Tollcross International Swimming Centre in Glasgow, United Kingdom from 13 to 17 July.

== Medalists ==
Event	Gold		Silver		Bronze	
S2	Yang Yang; China	4:17.86 WR	Dmitrii Kokarev; Russia	4:21.94 EU	Serhii Palamarchuk; Ukraine	4:26.81
S3	Dmytro Vynohradets; Ukraine	3:28.29	Alexander Makarov; Russia	3:35.19	Vincenzo Boni; Italy	3:41.96
S4	Jo Giseong; South Korea	2:56.23 CR	Roman Zhdanov; Russia	3:03.27	Gustavo Sánchez Martínez; Mexico	3:07.19
S5	Daniel Dias; Brazil	2:27.28	Andrew Mullen; Great Britain	2:41.35	Roy Perkins; United States	2:45.41
S14	Viacheslav Emeliantsev; Russia	1:56.87	Jon Margeir Sverrisson; Iceland	1:58.06	Thomas Hamer; Great Britain	1:58.42

Legend
WR: World record, CR: Championship record, AF: Africa record, AM: Americas record, AS: Asian record, EU: European record, OS: Oceania record

== See also ==
- List of IPC world records in swimming
