= 2015 IPC Swimming World Championships – Women's 50 metre backstroke =

The women's 50 metre backstroke at the 2015 IPC Swimming World Championships was held at the Tollcross International Swimming Centre in Glasgow, United Kingdom from 13 to 17 July.

== Medalists ==
Event	Gold		Silver		Bronze	
S2	Alexandra Agafonova (S2); Russia	1:09.19	Iryna Sotska (S2); Ukraine	1:13.36	Ingrid Thunem (S1); Norway	1:15.14
S3	Lisette Teunissen; Netherlands	51.23 WR	Guofen Meng; China	53.04 AS	Olga Sviderska; Ukraine	57.12
S4	Arjola Trimi; Italy	51.87	Bai Juan; China	52.68 AS	Edenia Garcia; Brazil	54.96
S5	Teresa Perales; Spain	44.61	Bela Trebinova; Czech Republic	46.23	Sarah Louise Rung; Norway	46.96

Legend
WR: World record, CR: Championship record, AF: Africa record, AM: Americas record, AS: Asian record, EU: European record, OS: Oceania record

== See also ==
- List of IPC world records in swimming
