= 2015 IPC Swimming World Championships – Women's 4 × 100 metre medley relay =

The Women's 4 x 100 metre medley at the 2015 IPC Swimming World Championships was held at the Tollcross International Swimming Centre in Glasgow, United Kingdom from 13 to 17 July.

As with other disability relay events, the medley works on a points system whereby the classification numbers of each swimmer are totaled to give a number no higher than 34.

== Medalists ==
Event	Gold		Silver		Bronze	
34pts	Alice Tai (S10); Claire Cashmore (SB8); Tully Kearney (S9); Susannah Rodgers (S7); Great Britain	4:52.89	Ellie Cole (S9); Madeleine Scott (SB9); Maddison Elliott (S8); Lakeisha Patterson (S8); Australia	4:53.88 OC	Valeriia Kukanova (S9); Olesia Vladykina (SB8); Nina Ryabova (S10); Ani Palian (S7); Russia	4:56.66

Legend
WR: World record, CR: Championship record, AF: Africa record, AM: Americas record, AS: Asian record, EU: European record, OS: Oceania record

== See also ==
- List of IPC world records in swimming
