= 2015 IPC Swimming World Championships – Women's 100 metre breaststroke =

The women's 100 metre breaststroke at the 2015 IPC Swimming World Championships was held at the Tollcross International Swimming Centre in Glasgow, United Kingdom from 13–17 July.

== Medalists ==
Event	Gold		Silver		Bronze	
SB4	Sarah Louise Rung; Norway	1:44.03 CR	Giulia Ghiretti; Italy	1:54.60	Natalia Shavel; Belarus	2:00.79
SB5	Verena Schott; Germany	1:51.43	Trịnh Thị Bích Như; Vietnam	1:57.43	Julia Castello Farre; Spain	1:57.83
SB6	Tiffany Thomas Kane; Australia	1:34.95 WR	Charlotte Henshaw; United Kingdom	1:36.94 EU	Ellie Simmonds; United Kingdom	1.39.99
SB7	Jessica Long; United States	1:32.46 CR	Lisa den Braber; Netherlands	1:34.20	Oksana Khrul; Ukraine	1:38.95
SB8	Olesia Vladykina; Russia	1:17.47 CR	Claire Cashmore; Great Britain	1:21.15	Katarina Roxon; Canada	1:21.97 AM
SB9	Chantalle Zijderveld; Netherlands	1:17.96	Zhang Meng; China	1:18.81 AS	Sophie Pascoe; New Zealand	1:19.74
SB11	Maja Reichard; Sweden	1:27.24 WR	Yana Berezhna; Ukraine	1:29.49	Nadia Baez; Argentina	1:34.29
SB13	Karolina Pelendritou (SB12); Cyprus	1:17.99	Emely Telle (SB12); Germany	1:18.34	Colleen Young (SB13); United States	1:19.31
SB14	Magda Toeters; Netherlands	1:16.16	Valeriia Shabalina; Russia	1:19.24	Michelle Alonso Morales; Spain	1:19.64

Legend
WR: World record, CR: Championship record, AF: Africa record, AM: Americas record, AS: Asian record, EU: European record, OS: Oceania record

== See also ==
- List of IPC world records in swimming
