= Keiichi Kimura (swimmer) =

Japanese Paralympic swimmer

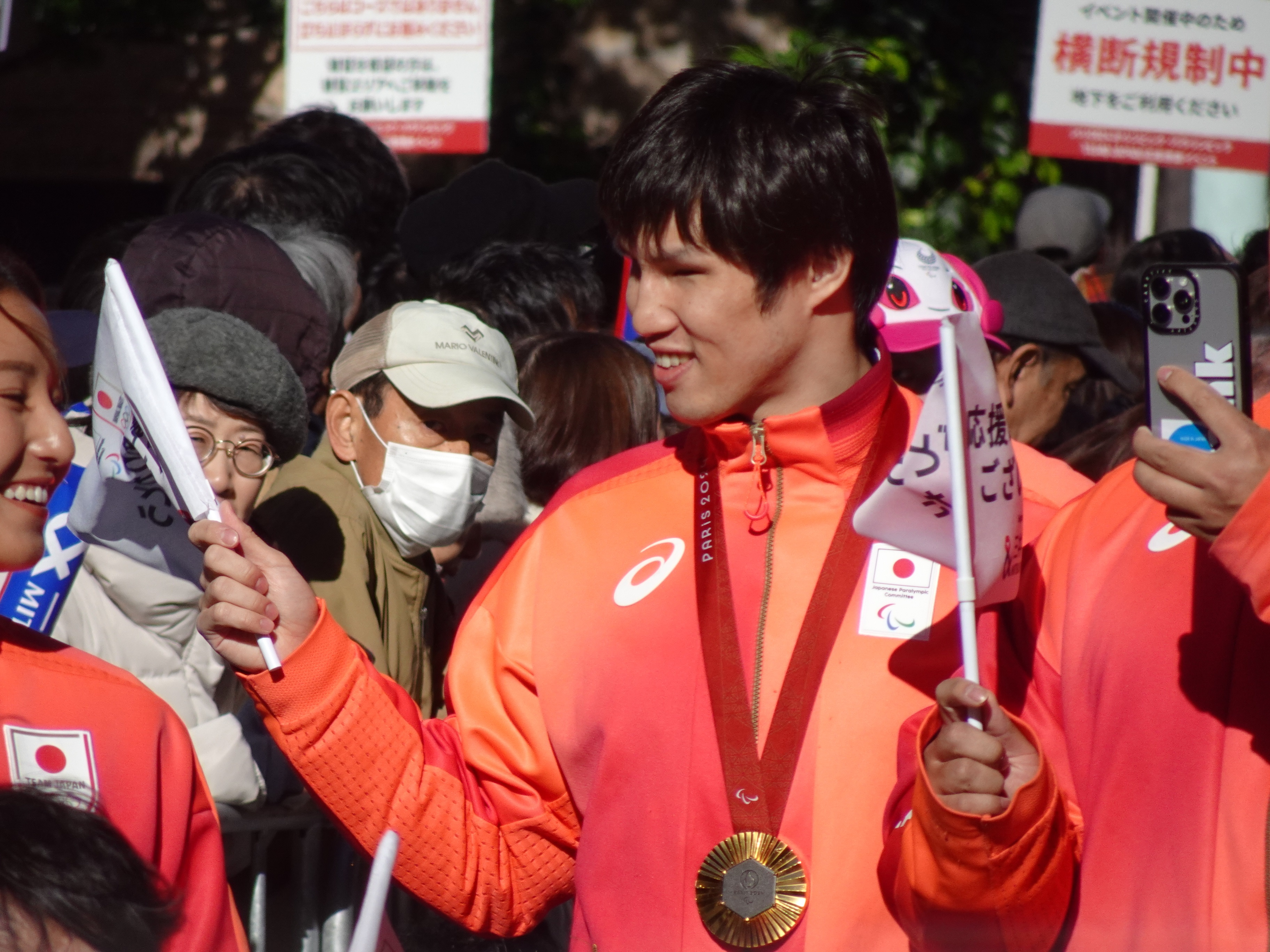
- Keiichi Kimura at Paris 2024 Summer Olympians and Paralympians Japan National Team parade event on November 30th, 2024

Personal information
- Nationality: Japan
- Born: 11 September 1990 (age 36) Rittō, Japan
- Height: 171 cm (5 ft 7 in)

Sport
- Sport: Swimming
- Strokes: Freestyle, backstroke, butterfly, medley
- Club: Tokyo 4TC
- Coach: Tomohiro Noguchi
Medal record
Swimming
Representing Japan
Paralympic Games
Gold medal – first place	2020 Tokyo	100 m butterfly S11
Gold medal – first place	2024 Paris	50 m freestyle S11
Gold medal – first place	2024 Paris	100 m butterfly S11
Silver medal – second place	2012 London	100 m breaststroke SB11
Silver medal – second place	2016 Rio de Janeiro	50 m freestyle S11
Silver medal – second place	2016 Rio de Janeiro	100 m butterfly S11
Silver medal – second place	2020 Tokyo	100 m breaststroke S11
Bronze medal – third place	2012 London	100 m butterfly S11
Bronze medal – third place	2016 Rio de Janeiro	100 m freestyle S11
Bronze medal – third place	2016 Rio de Janeiro	100 m breaststroke S11
World Championships
Gold medal – first place	2013 Montreal	100m freestyle S11
Gold medal – first place	2013 Montreal	100m breaststroke SB11
Gold medal – first place	2015 Glasgow	100m breaststroke SB11
Gold medal – first place	2015 Glasgow	100m butterfly S11
Gold medal – first place	2022 Madeira	100m butterfly S11
Silver medal – second place	2010 Eindhoven	100m Breaststroke SB11
Silver medal – second place	2013 Montreal	50m freestyle S11
Silver medal – second place	2015 Glasgow	50m freestyle SM11
Silver medal – second place	2022 Madeira	100m breaststroke SB11
Silver medal – second place	2023 Manchester	50m freestyle S11
Silver medal – second place	2023 Manchester	100m butterfly S11
Bronze medal – third place	2010 Eindhoven	200m ind. medley SM11
Bronze medal – third place	2010 Eindhoven	100m Freestyle S11
Bronze medal – third place	2010 Eindhoven	100m Butterfly S11
Bronze medal – third place	2013 Montreal	200m medley SM11
Bronze medal – third place	2013 Montreal	100m butterfly S11
Bronze medal – third place	2015 Glasgow	200m medley SM11
Bronze medal – third place	2022 Madeira	50m freestyle S11
Bronze medal – third place	2023 Manchester	100m breaststroke SB11
Bronze medal – third place	2025 Singapore	100 m butterfly S11
Bronze medal – third place	2025 Singapore	Mixed 4×100 m medley relay 49pts
Bronze medal – third place	2025 Singapore	Mixed 4×100 m freestyle relay 49pts
Asian Para Games
Gold medal – first place	2010 Guangzhou	200m ind. medley SM11
Gold medal – first place	2010 Guangzhou	50m freestyle S11
Gold medal – first place	2018 Jakarta	200m ind. medley SM11
Gold medal – first place	2018 Jakarta	100m breaststroke SB11
Gold medal – first place	2018 Jakarta	100m backstroke S11
Gold medal – first place	2018 Jakarta	50m freestyle S11
Gold medal – first place	2022 Hangzhou	100m butterfly S11
Silver medal – second place	2010 Guangzhou	100m breaststroke SB11
Silver medal – second place	2018 Jakarta	100m freestyle S11
Silver medal – second place	2022 Hangzhou	50m freestyle S11
Bronze medal – third place	2010 Guangzhou	100m backstroke S11

Keiichi Kimura (木村 敬一, Kimura Keiichi; born 11 September 1990) is a Japanese Paralympic swimmer competing mainly in category S11 events. He has competed at five Summer Paralympics, representing Japan from the 2008 to the 2024 Summer Paralympics, winning ten medals, three of which gold.
