= Lisette Teunissen =

Dutch Paralympic swimmer (born 1986)

Personal information
- Born: 18 February 1986 (age 40) Rotterdam, Netherlands

Sport
- Country: Netherlands
- Sport: Paralympic swimming
- Disability class: S4
Medal record
Paralympic swimming
Representing Netherlands
Paralympic Games
Gold medal – first place	2012 London	50m backstroke S4
Bronze medal – third place	2016 Rio de Janeiro	50m backstroke S3
World Championships
Gold medal – first place	2013 Montreal	50m backstroke S4
Gold medal – first place	2015 Glasgow	100m freestyle S3
Gold medal – first place	2015 Glasgow	50m backstroke S3
Silver medal – second place	2013 Montreal	100m freestyle S4
Silver medal – second place	2013 Montreal	200m freestyle S4
Silver medal – second place	2013 Montreal	150m individual medley SM4
Bronze medal – third place	2013 Montreal	50m freestyle S4

Lisette Teunissen (born 18 February 1986) is a retired Dutch Paralympic swimmer.

Teunissen represented the Netherlands at the 2008 Summer Paralympics, 2012 Summer Paralympics and 2016 Summer Paralympics.

Teunissen won the gold medal in the women's 50 metre backstroke S4 event at the 2012 Summer Paralympics held in London, United Kingdom and the bronze medal in the women's 50 metre backstroke S3 at the 2016 Summer Paralympics held in Rio de Janeiro, Brazil.

At the 2015 IPC Swimming World Championships held in Glasgow, United Kingdom, she won the gold medal in the women's 50 metre backstroke S4 event. She also won the gold medal in the women's 100 metre freestyle S3 event. She set new world records in both events.

Teunissen announced her retirement from competitive swimming in March 2018.
