= Cortney Jordan =

American Paralympic swimmer

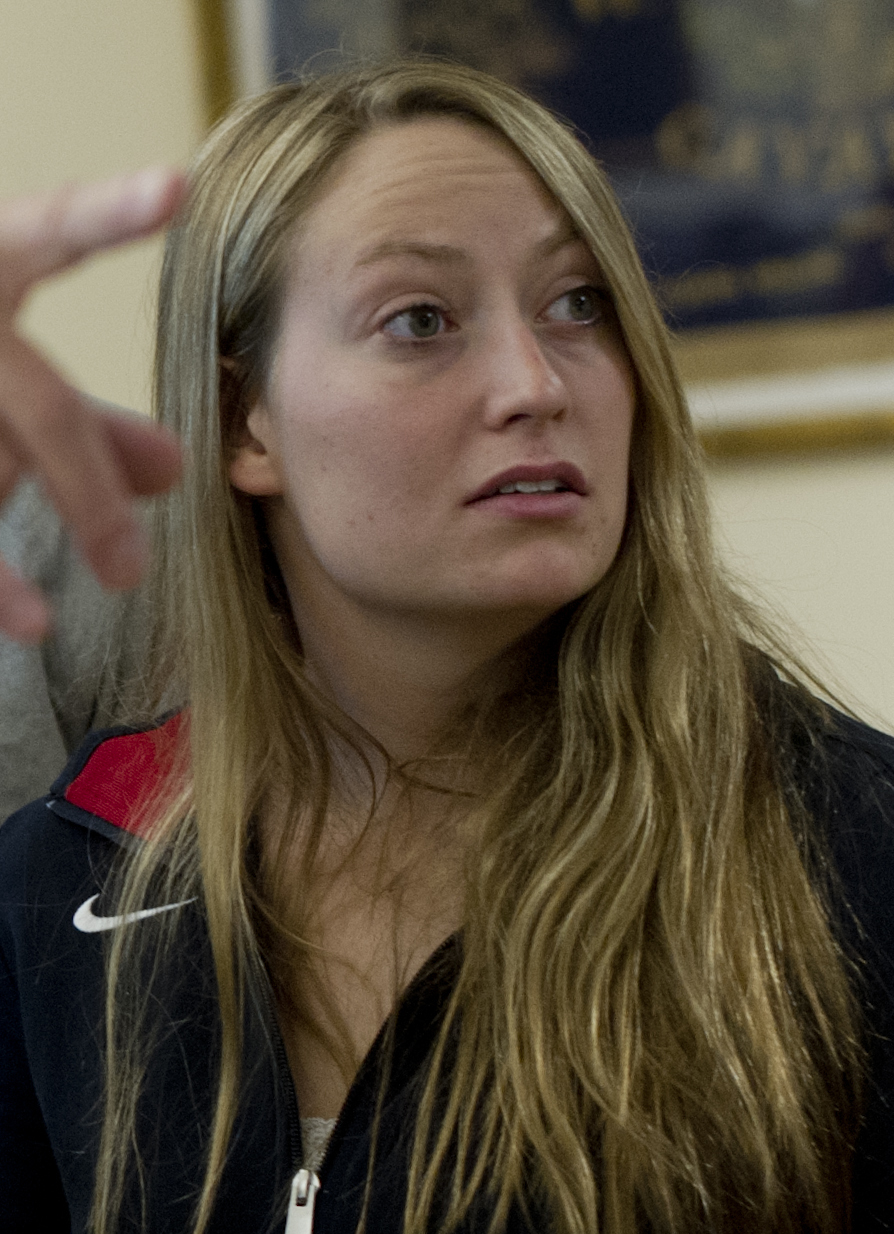
- Jordan in 2012

Personal information
- Full name: Cortney Llyn Jordan -Truitt
- Born: June 24, 1991 (age 35) Las Vegas, Nevada, U.S.
- Home town: Henderson, Nevada, U.S.
- Education: Cal Lutheran University (2013); Loyola University Maryland (MA 2016)
- Occupation: Grade School Teacher
- Height: 5 ft 3 in (160 cm)
- Weight: 130 lb (59 kg)

Sport
- Sport: Swimming
- Strokes: Backstroke, Freestyle, Medley
- College team: Cal Lutheran University (2009-13)
- Coach: Tom Dodd (Cal Lutheran); Tom Franke (U.S. Paralympic Team); Brian Loeffler (Loyola)
Medal record
Women's swimming
Representing United States
Paralympic Games
Gold medal – first place	2008 Beijing	50 metre freestyle S7
Silver medal – second place	2008 Beijing	100 metre freestyle S7
Silver medal – second place	2008 Beijing	400 metre freestyle S7
Silver medal – second place	2012 London	50 metre freestyle S7
Silver medal – second place	2012 London	100 metre freestyle S7
Silver medal – second place	2012 London	400 metre freestyle S7
Silver medal – second place	2016 Rio de Janeiro	50 metre butterfly S7
Silver medal – second place	2016 Rio de Janeiro	100 metre freestyle S7
Silver medal – second place	2016 Rio de Janeiro	400 metre freestyle S7
Bronze medal – third place	2008 Beijing	200 metre individual medley SM7
Bronze medal – third place	2012 London	100 metre backstroke S7
Bronze medal – third place	2016 Rio de Janeiro	200 metre individual medley SM7
IPC World Championships
Gold medal – first place	2010 Eindhoven	4x100m freestyle S7
Gold medal – first place	2013 Montreal	400m freestyle S7
Gold medal – first place	2013 Montreal	100m freestyle S7
Gold medal – first place	2013 Montreal	50m freestyle S7
Gold medal – first place	2015 Glasgow	100 m freestyle S7
Gold medal – first place	2015 Glasgow	400 m freestyle S7
Silver medal – second place	2010 Eindhoven	50m freestyle S7
Silver medal – second place	2013 Montreal	100m backstroke S7
Silver medal – second place	2015 Glasgow	50m butterfly S7
Silver medal – second place	2015 Glasgow	50m freestyle S7
Bronze medal – third place	2006 Durban	50m freestyle S7
Bronze medal – third place	2006 Durban	100m freestyle S7
Bronze medal – third place	2006 Durban	400m freestyle S7
Bronze medal – third place	2010 Eindhoven	100m freestyle S7
Bronze medal – third place	2010 Eindhoven	400m freestyle S7
Bronze medal – third place	2010 Eindhoven	200m individual medley SM7
Bronze medal – third place	2013 Montreal	200m medley SM7
Bronze medal – third place	2015 Glasgow	200 m medley SM7
Bronze medal – third place	2015 Glasgow	100 m backstroke S7
Parapan American Games
Silver medal – second place	2011 Guadalajara	50m freestyle S7
Silver medal – second place	2011 Guadalajara	100m freestyle S7
Silver medal – second place	2011 Guadalajara	200m individual medley SM7
Bronze medal – third place	2011 Guadalajara	100m backstroke S7
Bronze medal – third place	2011 Guadalajara	400m freestyle S7
Pan Pacific Para-Swimming Championships
Gold medal – first place	2014 Pasadena	400m freestyle S7
Gold medal – first place	2014 Pasadena	100m freestyle S7
Gold medal – first place	2014 Pasadena	50m freestyle S7
Silver medal – second place	2014 Pasadena	100m backstroke S7
Bronze medal – third place	2014 Pasadena	50m butterfly S7
Bronze medal – third place	2014 Pasadena	200m individual medley SM7
Bronze medal – third place	2014 Pasadena	4x50m 20pt mixed freestyle relay S7
IPC World Championships - 25m
Silver medal – second place	2009 Rio	50m freestyle
Silver medal – second place	2009 Rio	100m freestyle
Silver medal – second place	2009 Rio	200m freestyle
Silver medal – second place	2009 Rio	200m individual medley
FINA World Championships - 25m
Gold medal – first place	2010 Dubai	4x100m individual medley

Cortney Llyn Jordan (born June 24, 1991 in Las Vegas, Nevada), later known as Cortney Truitt is an American paralympic swimmer who received a total of 12 medals in freestyle and individual medley events at the 2008 Beijing, 2012 London, and 2016 Rio paralympics including one gold, eight silver and three bronze medals.

== Early life ==
Cortney Jordan was born to Dirk and Nancy Jordan in Las Vegas on June 24, 1991, and took up swimming by the age of seven. Her sister Mikaela competed in High School swimming. Her father Dirk was a Colonel in the Air Force, and as a result her family moved frequently during her early years. From an extended family involved in the swimming community, her grandfather Jarrett Jordan was a co-founder of Florida's Swimming Hall of Fame. Being born with cerebral palsey, she suffered from paralysis on her body's left side, losing the use of her left leg, and weakening her left arm. Despite her handicap, she competed regularly in swim meets during her High School years with able-bodied swimmers and was a four-year member of Coronado High's swimming and diving team.

After classifying as an S7 Paralympic competitor while still in High School, Jordan began to gain regional and then national recognition. Attending her first large paralympic event in 2005 in San Diego, she dominated in freestyle events. By her High School Sophomore year at Coronado High in Henderson, she attended her first International Paralympic competition, the IPC Swimming World Championship, winning three bronze medals in Durban South, Africa in December 2006.

== Swimming career ==
As noted previously, Jordan broke into the international paralympic swimming scene when around the age of 15 she won bronze medals in the 50, 100, and 400 metre freestyles at the 2006 IPC World Championships in Durban, South Africa.

== Paralympics ==
Gaining greater recognition on the world stage, Jordan participated in the 2008 Summer Paralympics where she won two silver medals for the 100 meter and 400 meter freestyles, a gold medal in the 50-meter freestyle and a bronze medal in the 200-meter freestyle. In the 2012 Summer Paralympics she earned three silver medals in the 50, 100, and 400 meter freestyle and a bronze medal in the 100 meter backstroke. In summary, prior to the 2016 Olympics, in the 2008 and 2012 Paralympics, Jordan had won a total of 8 medals in paralympic competition, which included 5 silver medals, a gold medal, and two bronze medals. By the 2016 paralympics, she was considered one of the most highly decorated swimming paralympians of her era. She was one of four team captains in 2012.

In 2016, while living in greater Baltimore, Jordan was rated second globally in the 400-meter freestyle after the Paralympic trials in July, 2016 in Charlotte, North Carolina. Continuing to win medals at the 2016 Summer Paralympics in Rio de Janeiro, in the S7 category, Jordan captured a silver medal in the 50-meter Butterfly, a silver in the 100-meter freestyle, and a bronze in the 400-meter freestyle.

== International competition ==
Jordan competed in the 2009 Short course World Championships in the 50, 100, and 400-meter freestyles and won silver medals in each event. The following year, she was awarded two gold medals for 4x100 individual medley and the 25 meter freestyle at the 2010 World Championships.

She participated at the ParaPan Pacific Games in Guadalajara in 2011, where she captured three silver medals for the 50, and 100 freestyles and the 200 metre individual medley. At the 2011 ParaPan games, she was also awarded bronze medals in the 400 metre freestyle and 100 metre backstroke.

=== Cal Lutheran University ===
Jordan attended Cal Lutheran University in Thousand Oaks, California on a swimming scholarship, where she continued to train in swimming, graduating magna cum laude in 2013. Jordan majored in Liberal Arts with a minor in Spanish, with a focus on Education. At Cal Lutheran, a Division III NCAA team, she was coached by Tom Dodd, a 1979 CSU Hayward graduate, who began as Head Swim Coach at Cal Lutheran in 2003, and was head swimming coach during Jordan's tenure with the women's varsity swim team from around 2009-2013. After her Junior year at Cal Lutheran, Cortney trained during the summer in Minnesota with the U.S. Paralympic Head Coach Tom Franke. Training with Paralympic Head Coach Franke, she attended rigorous swimming practices twice a day, improving her times to compete with the international competition at the 2012 Paralympics, realizing that the times in her classification had continued to improve. She had to miss the first two weeks of classes in her Senior year at Cal Lutheran to attend the 2012 Paralympics in London. After winning four medals at the 2012 Paralympics, she flew to Baltimore, to attend a reception for the Paralympic team members at the White House where she met President Obama.

In her Senior Year at Cal Lutheran, she directed the University's Writing Center while enrolled as a student. In her Senior Year at Cal Lutheran, reflecting her sound academic skills, Cortney was named the University's Scholar Athlete of the Year, and was a member of the CLU Scholar Athlete Society for her fourth successive year. Despite her handicap, in her Senior year she recorded her season best time in the 200-yard freestyle of 2:21.97 at the Southern California Intercollegiate Athletic Conference (SCIAC) Championship.

=== Loyola University Maryland ===
In 2013, her family moved to Baltimore, where she received a scholarship to attend Loyola University Maryland, and trained in swimming with Loyola's Coach Brian Loeffler. Loeffler, a former graduate and four-year swimmer for Loyola, coached swimming at Loyola as an Assistant Coach beginning in 1991, and as a Head Coach beginning in 1992, and had a 33 coaching history as of the 2024–5 season. Jordan completed a master's degree in Elementary Education at Loyola in May, 2016, prior to the 2016 Paralympics.

=== Careers ===
While a graduate student at Loyola Maryland, Jordan worked for Merritt Athletic Club in Towson, Maryland. At the time of the 2016 Paralympic trials, she was working teaching the fourth grade at Jessup's Bollman Bridge Elementary. She has also served as a substitute teacher at Howard County Public Schools in greater Baltimore.

=== Honors ===
In 2025, Jordan was nominated and was a finalist for the 2025 U.S. Olympic and Paralympic Hall of Fame.
