= Daniela Schulte =

German Paralympic swimmer

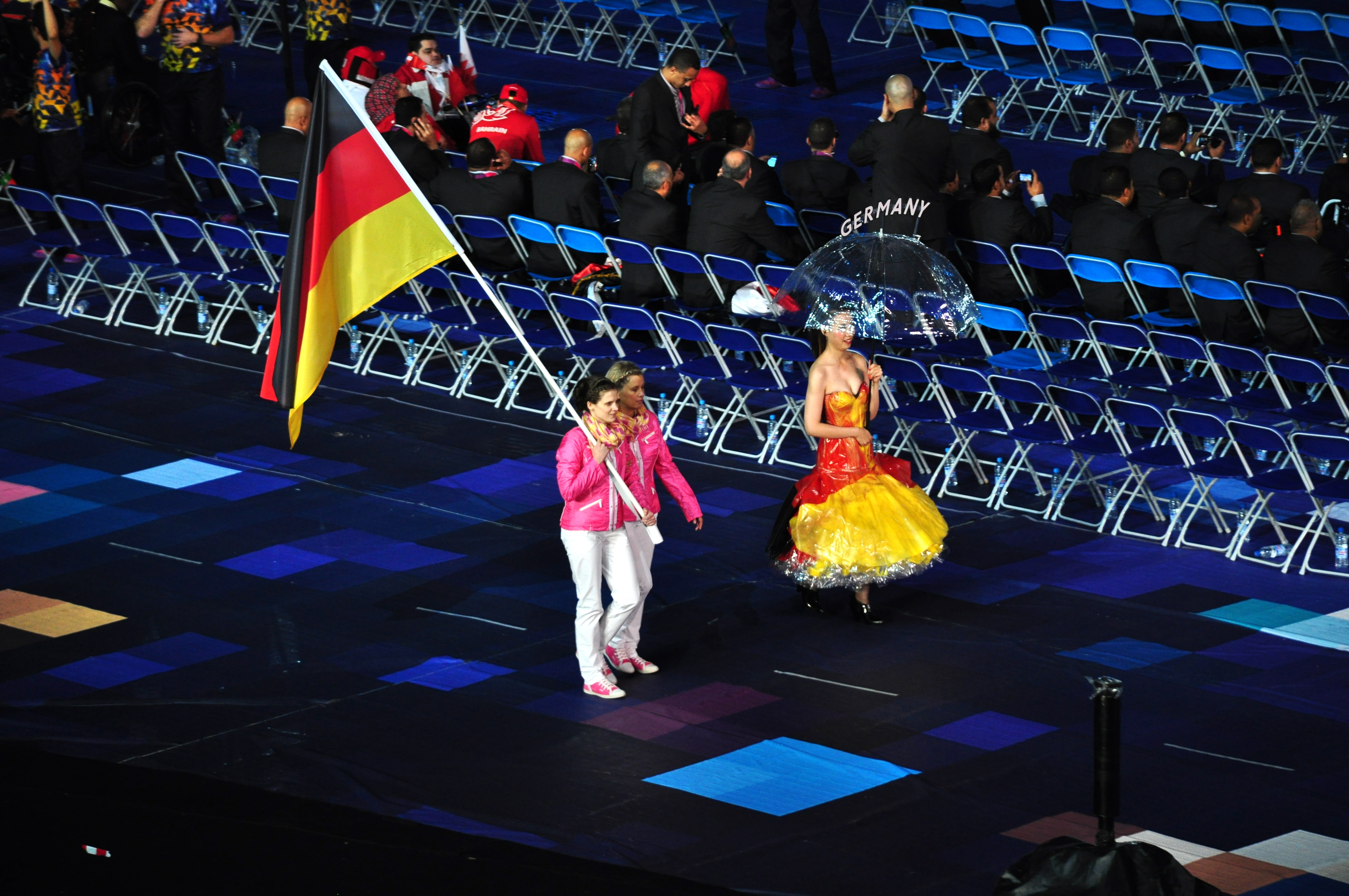
- Schulte at the 2012 Summer Paralympics

Personal information
- Nationality: German
- Born: 30 June 1982 (age 44) Berlin, Germany

Sport
- Country: Germany
- Sport: Swimming
- Club: PSC Berlin
- Coached by: Matthias Ulm
Medal record
Women's swimming
Representing Germany
Paralympic Games
Gold medal – first place	1996 Atlanta	4×100 m freestyle B1–3
Gold medal – first place	1996 Atlanta	4×100 m medley B1–3
Gold medal – first place	2012 London	400 metre freestyle S11
Silver medal – second place	1996 Atlanta	100 m freestyle B1
Silver medal – second place	1996 Atlanta	200 m medley B1
Silver medal – second place	2000 Sydney	100 m backstroke S11
Silver medal – second place	2012 London	200 metre individual medley SM11
Bronze medal – third place	2008 Beijing	100 m freestyle S11
IPC World Championships
Gold medal – first place	2010 Eindhoven	200m Individual Medley SM11
Gold medal – first place	2010 Eindhoven	100m Butterfly S11
Gold medal – first place	2010 Eindhoven	400m Freestyle S11
Gold medal – first place	2015 Glasgow	400m freestyle S11
Silver medal – second place	2015 Glasgow	100m freestyle S11
Silver medal – second place	2015 Glasgow	100m backstroke S11
Silver medal – second place	2015 Glasgow	200m medley SM11
Bronze medal – third place	2010 Eindhoven	100m Breaststroke SB11
Bronze medal – third place	2010 Eindhoven	100m Freestyle S11
Bronze medal – third place	2010 Eindhoven	100m Backstroke S11
IPC European Championships
Gold medal – first place	2009 Reykjavik	50 m freestyle – S11
Silver medal – second place	2009 Reykjavik	100 m freestyle – S11
Silver medal – second place	2016 Funchal	100 m backstroke S11
Bronze medal – third place	2016 Funchal	400 m freestyle S11
Bronze medal – third place	2016 Funchal	200m medley SM11

Daniela Schulte (born 30 June 1982) is a German Paralympic swimmer, competing in the S11 class. Having developed a genetically caused visual impairment aged nine, Schulte began to compete in swimming for competitors with a disability at the age of 13. A year later Schulte participated in the 1996 Summer Paralympics in Atlanta, winning gold medals with both the 4x100m freestyle and 4x100m medley relays B1-3 as well as two silver medals in the 100m freestyle and 200m individual medley B1 events. At the 2000 Summer Paralympics in Sydney, Schulte was able to add a silver medal in the 100m freestyle S11 to her tally.

In 2003 Schulte gave birth to twin boys. She returned to competition in 2007 and went on to win a bronze medal at the 2008 Summer Paralympics in Beijing. In 2012 she was chosen as the German flag bearer during the Opening Ceremony of the 2012 Summer Paralympics in London. During the Games Schulte won her first individual gold medal in the 400m freestyle S11 event and a silver medal in the 200m individual medley SM11.

In addition to her Paralympic honours, Schulte has also won 14 gold medals each at World and European Championships.
