= 2015 IPC Swimming World Championships – Men's 50 metre freestyle =

The men's 50 metre freestyle at the 2015 IPC Swimming World Championships was held at the Tollcross International Swimming Centre in Glasgow, United Kingdom from 13–17 July.

== Medalists ==
Event	Gold		Silver		Bronze	
S3	Dmytro Vynohradets; Ukraine	44.16 CR	Li Hanhua; China	44.25	Vincenzo Boni; Italy	48.45
S4	Eskender Mustafaev; Russia	38.17	Jo Giseong; South Korea	38.42	David Smetanine; France	39.60
S5	Daniel Dias; Brazil	32.71	Sebastián Rodríguez Veloso; Spain	34.61	Vo Thanh Tung; Vietnam	34.88
S6	Xu Qing; China	30.18	Zheng Tao; China	30.56	Oleksandr Komarov; Ukraine	32.10
S7	Sergey Sukharev; Russia	28.32	Yevheniy Bohodayko; Ukraine	28.55	Matthew Levy; Australia	28.71
S8	Denis Tarasov; Russia	25.34 CR	Wang Yinan; China	26.66	Konstantin Lisenkov; Russia	27.31
S9	Alexander Skaliukh; Russia	26.48	Takuro Yamada; Japan	26.57	Aleksandr Demianenko; Russia	26.67
S10	Andre Brasil; Brazil	23.20 CR	Phelipe Rodrigues; Brazil	23.81	Nathan Stein; Canada	23.84
S11	Bradley Snyder; United States	25.78 CR	Keiichi Kimura; Japan	26.83	Hendri Herbst; South Africa	27.04
S12	Maksym Veraksa; Ukraine	23.92	Raman Salei; Azerbaijan	24.39	Dzmitry Salei; Azerbaijan	24.46
S13	Ihar Boki; Belarus	23.20 WR	Carlos Farrenberg; Brazil	24.13 AR	Iaroslav Denysenko; Ukraine	24.23

Legend
WR: World record, CR: Championship record, AF: Africa record, AM: Americas record, AS: Asian record, EU: European record, OS: Oceania record

== See also ==
- List of IPC world records in swimming
