= Benoît Huot =

Canadian Paralympic swimmer

Benoît Huot CM CQ
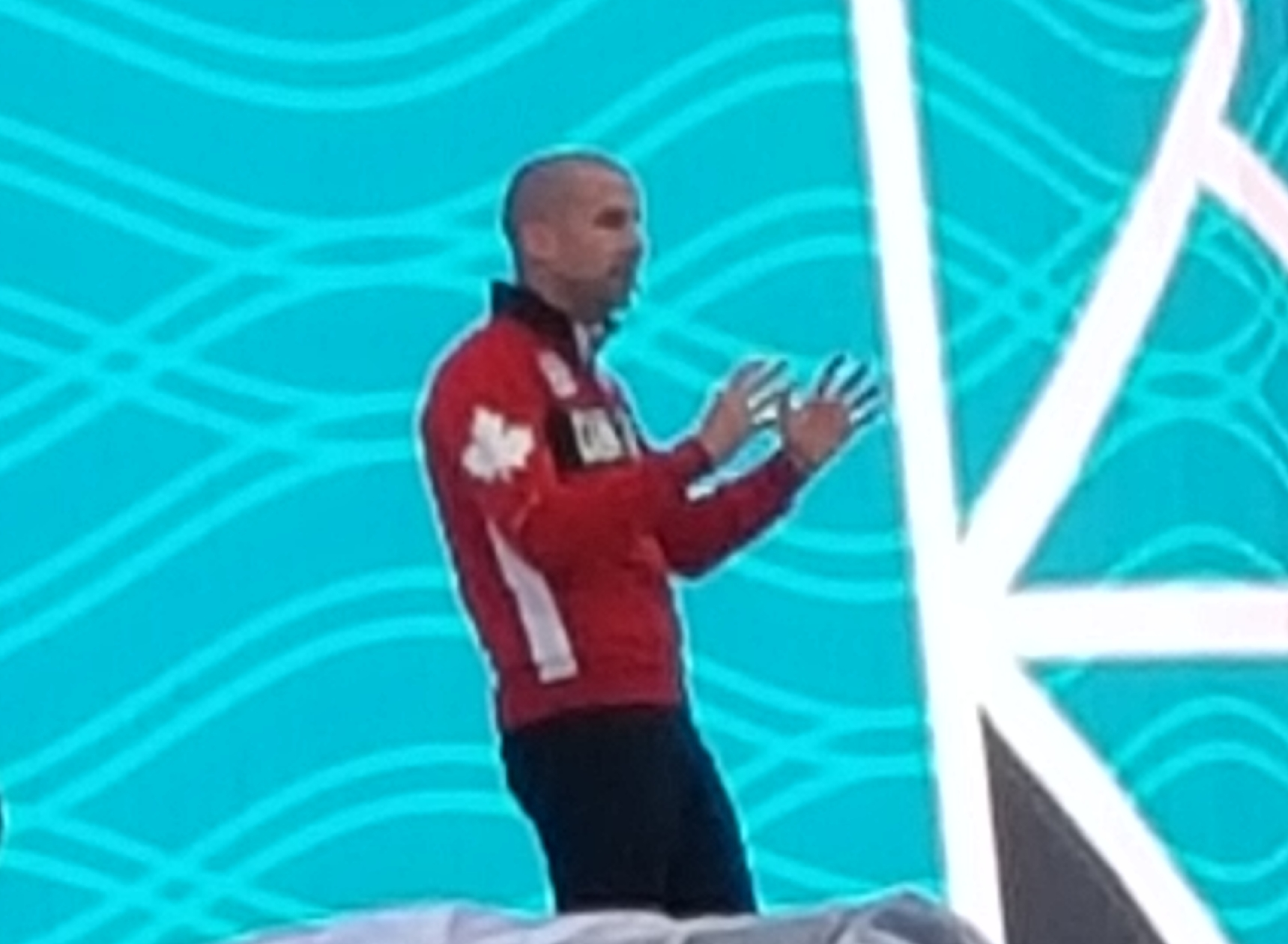

Personal information
- Born: January 24, 1984 (age 42) Longueuil, Quebec, Canada
- Height: 1.78 m (5 ft 10 in)
- Weight: 68 kg (150 lb)

Sport
- Country: Canada
- Sport: Swimming(S10)
Medal record
Men's swimming (S10)
Representing Canada
Paralympic Games
Gold medal – first place	2000 Sydney	50 m freestyle S10
Gold medal – first place	2000 Sydney	100 m butterfly S10
Gold medal – first place	2000 Sydney	200 m individual medley SM10
Gold medal – first place	2004 Athens	50 m freestyle S10
Gold medal – first place	2004 Athens	100 m freestyle S10
Gold medal – first place	2004 Athens	400 m freestyle S10
Gold medal – first place	2004 Athens	100 m butterfly S10
Gold medal – first place	2004 Athens	200 m individual medley SM10
Gold medal – first place	2012 London	200 m individual medley SM10
Silver medal – second place	2000 Sydney	100 m freestyle S10
Silver medal – second place	2000 Sydney	400 m freestyle S10
Silver medal – second place	2000 Sydney	100 m backstroke S10
Silver medal – second place	2004 Athens	100 m backstroke S10
Silver medal – second place	2012 London	400 m freestyle S10
Bronze medal – third place	2008 Beijing	50 m freestyle S10
Bronze medal – third place	2008 Beijing	100 m freestyle S10
Bronze medal – third place	2008 Beijing	400 m freestyle S10
Bronze medal – third place	2008 Beijing	200 m individual medley SM10
Bronze medal – third place	2012 London	100 m backstroke S10
Bronze medal – third place	2016 Rio de Janeiro	400 m freestyle S10
IPC World Championships
Silver medal – second place	2015 Glasgow	200m medley SM10
Silver medal – second place	2015 Glasgow	400m freestyle S10
Bronze medal – third place	2015 Glasgow	100 m backstroke S10
IPC World Championships - 25m
Silver medal – second place	2009 Rio de Janeiro	50 m freestyle S10
Silver medal – second place	2009 Rio de Janeiro	100 m freestyle S10
Silver medal – second place	2009 Rio de Janeiro	200 m individual medley SM10
Parapan American Games
Gold medal – first place	2015 Toronto	S10 400 m freestyle
Silver medal – second place	2015 Toronto	S10 200 m ind. medley
Silver medal – second place	2015 Toronto	S10 100 m backstroke
Silver medal – second place	2015 Toronto	34pts 4x100 m Medley Relay

Benoit Huot CM CQ (born January 24, 1984) is a Canadian Paralympic swimmer, who has won nine Paralympic Games gold medals for Canada, primarily in the freestyle and butterfly strokes.

Hailing from Longueuil, Quebec, Huot was born with club feet, started swimming competitively at age 10 at the CAMO Natation club, where he is trained by Benoit Lebrun. In the beginning he competed alongside able-bodied swimmers and competed at two Quebec Games, earning silver in 1997.

== Career ==
Benoit Huot made his international debut in 1998 as a member of Canada's team at the International Paralympic Committee world championships, where he won two gold and four silver medals. He added three more gold and three silver medals at the 2000 Paralympics and eight medals at the 2002 IPC Swimming World Championships.

In 2003, Huot was named the male athlete of the year with a disability by the International Commonwealth Federation.

In 2004, Huot grabbed five gold medals, one silver medal and three world records at the 2004 Paralympic Games in Athens.

In 2005, Huot won six golds at the Disability Sport England Swimming Championships. He then went on to take a gold and a silver at the inaugural Paralympic World Cup in Manchester in events that were swum just 15 minutes apart. This led the Swimming World Magazine to award him the World Disabled Swimmer of the Year award.

At the 2012 Summer Paralympics in London he won gold, silver, and bronze medals, giving him a total of 19 medals in four Paralympic Games. He was named Canada's flag bearer for the Games closing ceremony.

Huot has served on the athletes' council with Swimming Canada, the Canadian Paralympic Committee and Commonwealth Games Federation.

== Awards and honours ==
In 2011, Huot was inducted into the Canadian Disability Hall of Fame. In December 2016, Huot was named a Member of the Order of Canada. In 2018, he was made a Knight of the National Order of Quebec.

== Robbery ==
On July 27, 2014, Huot's home in Longueuil was robbed. Among the stolen items were seven medals, including two Paralympic medals. The athlete then appealed to the public Sunday afternoon on Twitter. The idea of never seeing his medals is "heartbreaking," he pleads. "Those medals represent a lifetime of work. Hours and hours of work to get them," said Huot in an interview.

As Huot's house was under renovation at the time, he was not there when it was broken into during the night from Saturday to Sunday. The Longueuil Police Department is continuing its investigation.
