= 2015 IPC Swimming World Championships – Men's 150 metre individual medley =

The men's 150 metre individual medley at the 2015 IPC Swimming World Championships was held at the Tollcross International Swimming Centre in Glasgow, United Kingdom from 13–17 July.

== Medalists ==
Event	Gold		Silver		Bronze	
SM3	Dmytro Vynohradets; Ukraine	3:01.28	Grant Patterson; Australia	3:08.94	Arnulfo Castorena; Mexico	3:17.70
SM4	Roman Zhdanov; Russia	2:25.24	Cameron Leslie; New Zealand	2:26.55	Jin Zhipeng; China	2:36.90

Legend
WR: World record, CR: Championship record, AF: Africa record, AM: Americas record, AS: Asian record, EU: European record, OS: Oceania record

== See also ==
- List of IPC world records in swimming
