= 2015 IPC Swimming World Championships – Women's 200 metre freestyle =

Swimming competition in Glasgow, Scotland

The women's 200 metre freestyle at the 2015 IPC Swimming World Championships was held at the Tollcross International Swimming Centre in Glasgow, Scotland from 13 to 17 July.

== Medalists ==
Event	Gold		Silver		Bronze	
S5	Sarah Louise Rung; Norway	2:53.20	Inbal Pezaro; Israel	2:57.18	Teresa Perales; Spain	3:03.59
S14	Valeriia Shabalina; Russia	2:04.98 WR	Jessica-Jane Applegate; Great Britain	2:06.98	Marlou van der Kulk; Netherlands	2:11.73

Legend
WR: World record, CR: Championship record, AF: Africa record, AM: Americas record, AS: Asian record, EU: European record, OS: Oceania record

== See also ==
- List of IPC world records in swimming
