= 2015 IPC Swimming World Championships – Men's 400 metre freestyle =

The men's 400 metre freestyle at the 2015 IPC Swimming World Championships was held at the Tollcross International Swimming Centre in Glasgow, United Kingdom from 13–17 July.

== Medalists ==
Event	Gold		Silver		Bronze	
S6	Francesco Bocciardo; Italy	5:05.49	Andrei Granichka; Russia	5:06.51	Darragh McDonald; Ireland	5:12.61
S7	Andrei Gladkov; Russia	4:46.72	Andreas Skaar Bjornstad; Norway	4:58.60	Marian Kvasnytsia; Ukraine	5:00.73
S8	Oliver Hynd; Great Britain	4:24.32 WR	Wang Yinan; China	4:33.47	Robert Griswold; United States	4:36.26 AM
S9	Brenden Hall; Australia	4:15.03	Federico Morlacchi; Italy	4:17.50	David Grachat; Portugal	4:23.79
S10	Dmitry Bartasinskiy; Russia	4:09.50	Benoit Huot; Canada	4:11.55	Dmytro Vanzenko; Ukraine	4:13.03
S11	Bradley Snyder; United States	4:37.13 CR	Matheus Rheine; Brazil	4:45.45	Tharon Drake; United States	4:58.40
S13	Ihar Boki (S13); Belarus	3:59.48	Iaroslav Denysenko (S13); Ukraine	4:00.69	Dmitriy Horlin (S12); Uzbekistan	4:09.36 AS

Legend
WR: World record, CR: Championship record, AF: Africa record, AM: Americas record, AS: Asian record, EU: European record, OS: Oceania record

== See also ==
- List of IPC world records in swimming
