= 2015 IPC Swimming World Championships – Women's 100 metre butterfly =

The women’s 100 metre butterfly at the 2015 IPC Swimming World Championships was held at the Tollcross International Swimming Centre in Glasgow, United Kingdom from 13–17 July.

== Medalists ==
Event	Gold		Silver		Bronze	
S8	Jessica Long; United States	1:09.79 CR	Kateryna Istomina; Ukraine	1:10.05	Maddison Elliott; Australia	1:14.20 OC
S9	Tully Kearney; Great Britain	1:09.04 EU	Sarai Gascon; Spain	1:09.31	Nuria Marques Soto; Spain	1:10.01
S10	Sophie Pascoe; New Zealand	1:03.74 CR	Oliwia Jablonska; Poland	1:09.34	Alice Tai; Great Britain	1:09.57
S13	Darya Stukalova (S12); Russia	1:04.13	Rebecca Meyers (S13); United States	1:05.03 WR	Joanna Mendak (S13); Poland	1:05.69 EU

Legend
WR: World record, CR: Championship record, AF: Africa record, AM: Americas record, AS: Asian record, EU: European record, OS: Oceania record

== See also ==
- List of IPC world records in swimming
