= 2015 IPC Swimming World Championships – Women's 50 metre breaststroke =

The women's 50 metre breaststroke at the 2015 IPC Swimming World Championships was held at the Tollcross International Swimming Centre in Glasgow, United Kingdom from 13 to 17 July.

== Medalists ==
Event	Gold		Silver		Bronze	
SB3	Natalia Gavrilyuk; Russia	1:02.19	Nely Miranda Herrera; Mexico	1:02.94 AM	Patricia Valle; Mexico	1:03.17

Legend
WR: World record, CR: Championship record, AF: Africa record, AM: Americas record, AS: Asian record, EU: European record, OS: Oceania record

== See also ==
- List of IPC world records in swimming
