= Andrei Kalina =

Russian Paralympic swimmer

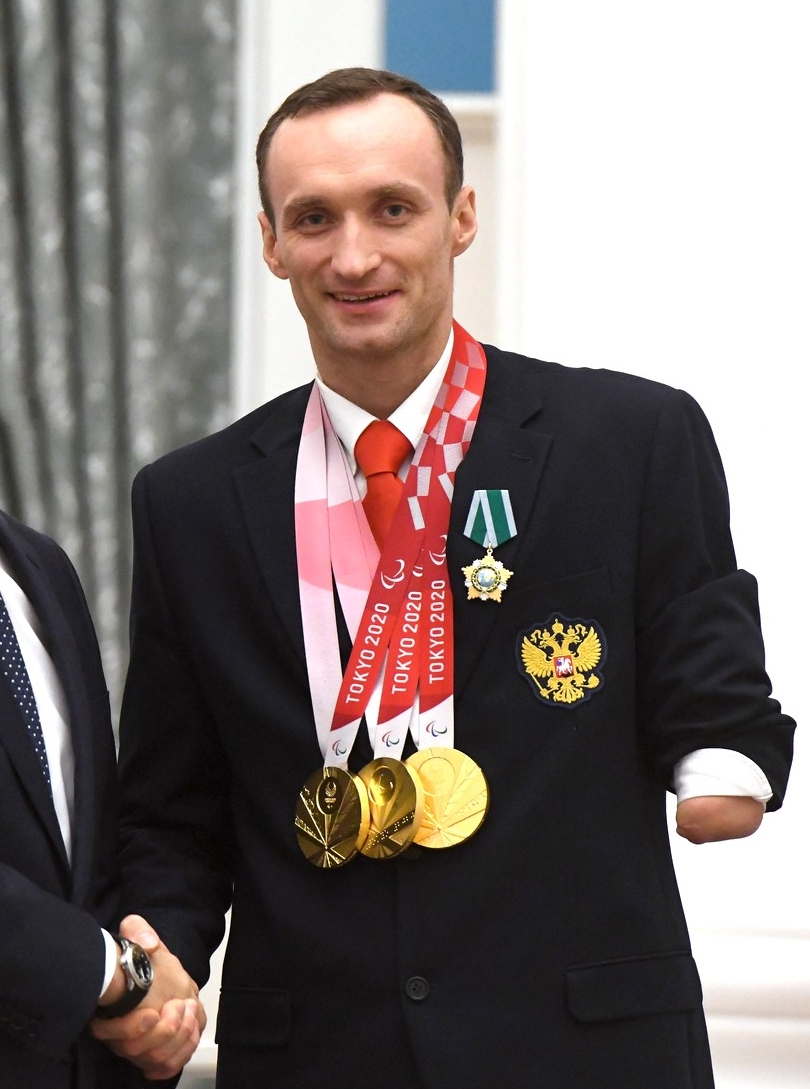
- Kalina in 2021

Personal information
- Full name: Andrei Yakovlevich Kalina
- Nationality: Russian
- Born: 21 July 1987 (age 39) Sloviansk, Ukrainian SSR, Soviet Union (now Ukraine)
- Education: Donbas State Pedagogical University

Sport
- Sport: Paralympic swimming
- Disability class: SB8, SM9
- Coached by: Olga Baydalova
Medal record
Paralympic swimming
Representing RPC
Paralympic Games
Gold medal – first place	2020 Tokyo	100 m breaststroke SB8
Gold medal – first place	2020 Tokyo	200 m ind. medley SM9
Gold medal – first place	2020 Tokyo	4 × 100 m medley relay 34pts
Representing Russia
World Championships
Gold medal – first place	2015 Glasgow	100 m breaststroke SB8
Gold medal – first place	2015 Glasgow	4 × 100 m freestyle relay 34pts
Gold medal – first place	2015 Glasgow	4 × 100 m medley relay 34pts
Gold medal – first place	2019 London	100 m breaststroke SB8
Gold medal – first place	2019 London	200 m ind. medley SM9
Gold medal – first place	2019 London	4 × 100 m medley relay 34pts
Silver medal – second place	2015 Glasgow	200 m ind. medley SM9
European Championships
Gold medal – first place	2026 Kocaeli	100 m breaststroke SB8
Representing Ukraine
Paralympic Games
Gold medal – first place	2004 Athens	100 m breaststroke SB8
Gold medal – first place	2008 Beijing	100 m breaststroke SB8
Gold medal – first place	2012 London	100 m breaststroke SB8
Silver medal – second place	2004 Athens	200 m ind. medley SM9
Silver medal – second place	2008 Beijing	200 m ind. medley SM9
Silver medal – second place	2012 London	200 m ind. medley SM9
Bronze medal – third place	2008 Beijing	4x100 m medley relay 34 pts
World Championships
Gold medal – first place	2010 Eindhoven	100 m breaststroke SB8
Gold medal – first place	2013 Montreal	100 m breaststroke SB8
Silver medal – second place	2010 Eindhoven	200 m ind. medley SM9
Silver medal – second place	2013 Montreal	200 m ind. medley SM9
Bronze medal – third place	2010 Eindhoven	4x100 m medley relay 34pts
Bronze medal – third place	2013 Montreal	4x100m medley relay 34pts
European Championships
Gold medal – first place	2009 Reykjavik	100 m breaststroke SB8
Gold medal – first place	2009 Reykjavik	4x100 m medley relay 34pts
Gold medal – first place	2009 Reykjavik	200 m ind. medley SM9
Bronze medal – third place	2009 Reykjavik	4x100 m freestyle relay 34pts
Representing Neutral Paralympic Athletes
Paralympic Games
Gold medal – first place	2024 Paris	100 m breaststroke SB8
World Championships
Gold medal – first place	2025 Singapore	100 m breaststroke SB8
European Championships
Gold medal – first place	2024 Funchal	100 m breaststroke SB8
Bronze medal – third place	2024 Funchal	200 m ind. medley SM9

Andrei Yakovlevich Kalina (Russian: Андрей Яковлевич Калина, Ukrainian: Андрій Якович Калина, romanized: Andriy Yakovych Kalyna; born 21 July 1987) is a Ukraine-born Russian Paralympic swimmer who represented Ukraine from 2002 to 2013 and Russia since 2015.

== Early life ==
Kalina was born 21 July 1987 in Slavyansk (Sloviansk), Ukrainian Soviet Socialist Republic, Soviet Union, with a missing left lower arm. In 2000, he started swimming in the Donetsk-based sports center Invasport. However, he almost decided to retire from sports after he did not find good conditions even in Kyiv. So, he started search them outside of Ukraine, eventually deciding to emigrate to Russia in 2013. After finding better practice and living conditions in Russia, Kalina decided to represent Russia internationally in 2015. During Russian-Ukrainian War silently supported aggression against his home country.

== Career ==
Competing for Ukraine, Kalina won numerous titles, including the Paralympic Games three times in a row. Kalina won his fourth title out of four appearances in 100 m breaststroke, at the 2020 Summer Paralympics now representing the Russian Paralympic Committee.
