= 2015 IPC Swimming World Championships – Women's 4 × 100 metre freestyle relay =

The Women's 100 metre x 4 freestyle at the 2015 IPC Swimming World Championships was held at the Tollcross International Swimming Centre in Glasgow, United Kingdom from 13 to 17 July.

As with other disability relay events, the freestyle works on a points system whereby the classification numbers of each swimmer are totaled to give a number no higher than 34.

== Medalists ==
Event	Gold		Silver		Bronze	
34pts	Ashleigh McConnell S9; Lakeisha Patterson S8; Maddison Elliott S8; Ellie Cole S9; Australia	4:24.17	McKenzie Coan S8; Hannah Aspden S9; Jessica Long S8; Michelle Konkoly S9; United States	4:25.45	Claire Cashmore S9; Tully Kearney S9; Alice Tai S10; Ellie Simmonds S6; Great Britain	4:29.83

Legend
WR: World record, CR: Championship record, AF: Africa record, AM: Americas record, AS: Asian record, EU: European record, OS: Oceania record

== See also ==
- List of IPC world records in swimming
