= 2015 IPC Swimming World Championships – Women's 50 metre butterfly =

The women’s 50 metre butterfly at the 2015 IPC Swimming World Championships was held at the Tollcross International Swimming Centre in Glasgow, United Kingdom from 13–17 July.

== Medalists ==
Event	Gold		Silver		Bronze	
S5	Sarah Louise Rung; Norway	43.80	Teresa Perales; Spain	46.05	Reka Kezdi; Hungary	46.74
S6	Oksana Khrul; Ukraine	37.33	Tiffany Thomas Kane; Australia	38.17 OC	Lu Dong; China	38.46
S7	Nikita Howarth; New Zealand	35.93	Cortney Jordan; United States	36.52	Sarah Mehain; Canada	36.98

Legend
WR: World record, CR: Championship record, AF: Africa record, AM: Americas record, AS: Asian record, EU: European record, OS: Oceania record

== See also ==
- List of IPC world records in swimming
