= 2015 IPC Swimming World Championships – Men's 50 metre backstroke =

The men's 50 metre backstroke at the 2015 IPC Swimming World Championships was held at the Tollcross International Swimming Centre in Glasgow, United Kingdom from 13–17 July.

== Medalists ==
| Event | Gold | | Silver | | Bronze | |
|---|---|---|---|---|---|---|
| S1 | Hennadii Boiko; Ukraine | 1:07.55 CR | Anton Kol; Ukraine | 1:17.23 | Christos Tampaxis; Greece | 1:24.90 |
| S2 | Yang Yang; China | 59.60 AS | Dmitrii Kokarev; Russia | 1:00.19 | Serhii Palamarchuk; Ukraine | 1:00.55 |
| S3 | Dmytro Vynohradets; Ukraine | 47.63 CR | Vincenzo Boni; Italy | 48.41 | Alexander Makarov; Russia | 51.74 |
| S4 | Roman Zhdanov; Russia | 43.81 CR | Juan Ignacio Reyes; Mexico | 44.85 | Aleksei Lyzhikhin; Russia | 46.97 |
| S5 | Daniel Dias; Brazil | 35.34 CR | Andrew Mullen; Great Britain | 37.68 | Beytullah Eroglu; Turkey | 40.27 |

Legend
WR: World record, CR: Championship record, AF: Africa record, AM: Americas record, AS: Asian record, EU: European record, OS: Oceania record

== See also ==
- List of IPC world records in swimming
