= 2015 IPC Swimming World Championships – Men's 100 metre breaststroke =

The men's 100 metre breaststroke at the 2015 IPC Swimming World Championships was held at the Tollcross International Swimming Centre in Glasgow, United Kingdom from 13–17 July.

== Medalists ==
Event	Gold		Silver		Bronze	
SB4	Daniel Dias; Brazil	1:36.54	Antonios Tsapatakis; Greece	1:36.75	Ricardo Ten; Spain	1:39.90
SB5	Iurii Luchkin; Russia	1:32.01 CR	Karl Forsman; Sweden	1:33.40	Andrei Granichka; Russia	1:34.33
SB6	Yevheniy Bohodayko; Ukraine	1:21.92	Nelson Crispín; Colombia	1:22.83 AM	Torben Schmidtke; Germany	1:23.13
SB7	Carlos Serrano Zárate; Colombia	1:16.68 WR	Blake Cochrane; Australia	1:17.45	Simon Boer; Netherlands	1:18.83
SB8	Andrei Kalina; Russia	1:07.38	Oscar Salguero Galisteo; Spain	1:10.82	Andreas Onea; Austria	1:12.34
SB9	Kevin Paul; South Africa	1:04.50 CR	Pavel Poltavtsev; Russia	1:05.83	Rick Pendleton; Australia	1:09.04 OC
SB11	Keiichi Kimura; Japan	1:14.04 CR	Tharon Drake; United States	1:15.26	Oleksandr Mashchenko; Ukraine	1:16.49
SB12	Oleksii Fedyna; Ukraine	1:05.25 CR	Dzmitry Salei; Azerbaijan	1:06.93	Anuar Akhmetov; Kazakhstan	1:08.48 AS
SB13	Uladzimir Izotau; Belarus	1:06.86	Ihar Boki; Belarus	1:07.11	Mikhail Zimin; Russia	1:08.24
SB14	Marc Evers; Netherlands	1:07.10	Scott Quin; Great Britain; Yasuhiro Tanaka; Japan	1:07.99	n/a	

Legend
WR: World record, CR: Championship record, AF: Africa record, AM: Americas record, AS: Asian record, EU: European record, OS: Oceania record

== See also ==
- List of IPC world records in swimming
