= 2015 IPC Swimming World Championships – Women's 400 metre freestyle =

The women's 400 metre freestyle at the 2015 IPC Swimming World Championships was held at the Tollcross International Swimming Centre in Glasgow, United Kingdom from 13–17 July.

== Medalists ==
| Event | Gold | | Silver | | Bronze | |
|---|---|---|---|---|---|---|
| S6 | Yelyzaveta Mereshko; Ukraine | 5:21.76 CR | Ellie Simmonds; Great Britain | 5:22.54 | Vianney Trejo Delgadillo; Mexico | 5:46.12 |
| S7 | Cortney Jordan; United States | 5:22.50 | Rebecca Dubber; New Zealand | 5:25.34 | Ani Palian; Russia | 5:30.26 |
| S8 | Jessica Long; United States | 4:47.95 | Maddison Elliott; Australia | 5:01.69 | Lakeisha Patterson; Australia | 5:04.17 |
| S9 | Tully Kearney; Great Britain | 4:39.29 EU | Nuria Marques Soto; Spain | 4:49.47 | Manon Vermarien; Netherlands | 4:53.80 |
| S10 | Aurelie Rivard; Canada | 4:34.06 | Elodie Lorandi; France | 4:38.77 | Oliwia Jablonska; Poland | 4:39.62 |
| S11 | Daniela Schulte; Germany | 5:20.46 | Mary Fisher; New Zealand | 5:24.81 | Li Guizhi; China | 5:43.98 |
| S13 | Rebecca Meyers; United States | 4:21.66 WR | Anna Stetsenko; Ukraine | 4:28.32 | Ariadna Edo Beltran; Spain | 4:40.60 |

Legend
WR: World record, CR: Championship record, AF: Africa record, AM: Americas record, AS: Asian record, EU: European record, OS: Oceania record

== See also ==
- List of IPC world records in swimming
