= André Brasil =

Brazilian Paralympic swimmer

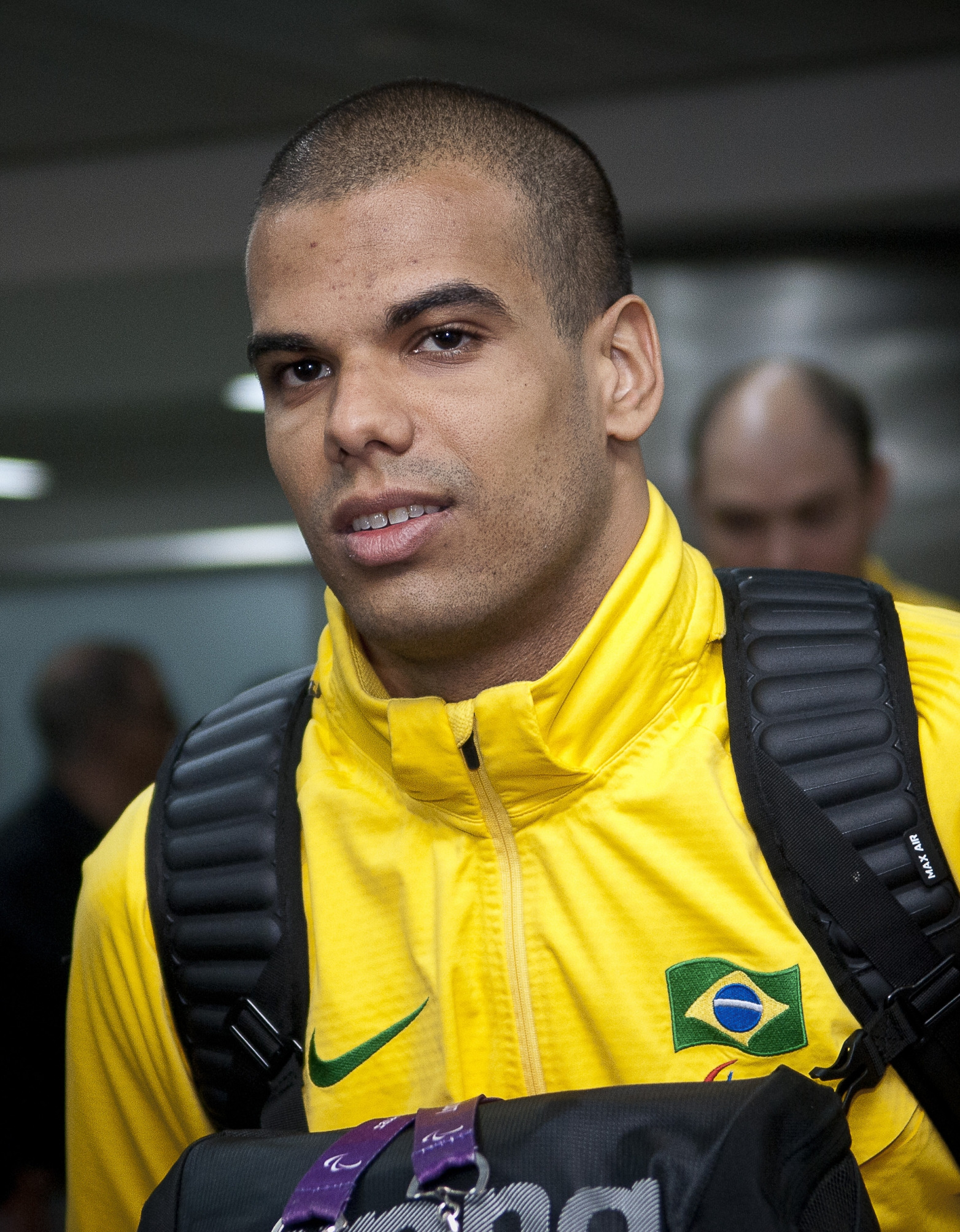
- André Brasi in 2012

Personal information
- Full name: André Brasil Esteves
- Born: May 23, 1984 (age 42) Rio de Janeiro, Brazil
- Height: 183 cm (6 ft 0 in)
- Weight: 75 kg (165 lb)

Sport
- Sport: Swimming
- Strokes: Backstroke, butterfly, freestyle, medley
Medal record
Representing Brazil
Paralympic Games
Gold medal – first place	2008 Beijing	50 m freestyle S10
Gold medal – first place	2008 Beijing	100 m freestyle S10
Gold medal – first place	2008 Beijing	400 m freestyle S10
Gold medal – first place	2008 Beijing	100 m butterfly S10
Gold medal – first place	2012 London	50 m freestyle S10
Gold medal – first place	2012 London	100 m freestyle S10
Gold medal – first place	2012 London	100 m butterfly S10
Silver medal – second place	2008 Beijing	200 m Individual Medley SM10
Silver medal – second place	2012 London	200 m Individual Medley SM10
Silver medal – second place	2012 London	100 m backstroke S10
Silver medal – second place	2016 Rio	100 m freestyle S10
Silver medal – second place	2016 Rio	4×100 m freestyle relay 34pts
Bronze medal – third place	2016 Rio	100 m butterfly S10
Bronze medal – third place	2016 Rio	4×100 m medley relay 34pts
IPC World Championships
Gold medal – first place	2010 Eindhoven	50 m freestyle S10
Gold medal – first place	2010 Eindhoven	100 m freestyle S10
Gold medal – first place	2010 Eindhoven	400 m freestyle S10
Gold medal – first place	2010 Eindhoven	100 m backstroke S10
Gold medal – first place	2010 Eindhoven	100 m butterfly S10
Gold medal – first place	2013 Montreal	50 m freestyle S10
Gold medal – first place	2013 Montreal	100 m freestyle S10
Gold medal – first place	2013 Montreal	100 m butterfly S10
Gold medal – first place	2015 Glasgow	50 m freestyle S10
Gold medal – first place	2015 Glasgow	100 m freestyle S10
Gold medal – first place	2015 Glasgow	100 m backstroke S10
Silver medal – second place	2010 Eindhoven	200 m medley SM10
Silver medal – second place	2010 Eindhoven	4 x 100 m freestyle 34pts
Silver medal – second place	2013 Montreal	100 m backstroke S10
Silver medal – second place	2013 Montreal	200 m medley SM10
Silver medal – second place	2013 Montreal	100 m freestyle relay 34pts
Silver medal – second place	2015 Glasgow	100 m butterfly S10
Silver medal – second place	2015 Glasgow	100 m freestyle relay 34pts
IPC World Championships 25m
Gold medal – first place	2009 Rio de Janeiro	50 m freestyle S10
Gold medal – first place	2009 Rio de Janeiro	100 m freestyle S10
Gold medal – first place	2009 Rio de Janeiro	400 m freestyle S10
Gold medal – first place	2009 Rio de Janeiro	100 m backstroke S10
Gold medal – first place	2009 Rio de Janeiro	100 m butterfly S10
Gold medal – first place	2009 Rio de Janeiro	100 m individual medley SM10
Gold medal – first place	2009 Rio de Janeiro	200 m individual medley SM10
Silver medal – second place	2009 Rio de Janeiro	4×50 m medley relay 20 pts
Parapan American Games
Gold medal – first place	2011 Guadalajara	50m freestyle S9
Gold medal – first place	2011 Guadalajara	100m freestyle S10
Gold medal – first place	2011 Guadalajara	400m freestyle S10
Gold medal – first place	2011 Guadalajara	100m breaststroke SB9
Gold medal – first place	2011 Guadalajara	4x100m freestyle relay
Gold medal – first place	2011 Guadalajara	4x100m medley relay
Gold medal – first place	2015 Toronto	100m freestyle S10
Gold medal – first place	2015 Toronto	100m backstroke S10
Gold medal – first place	2015 Toronto	100m butterfly S10
Gold medal – first place	2015 Toronto	200m individual medley SM10
Gold medal – first place	2015 Toronto	4x100m freestyle relay
Gold medal – first place	2015 Toronto	4x100m medley relay
Silver medal – second place	2015 Toronto	50m freestyle S10

André Brasil Esteves (born May 23, 1984) is a Paralympic swimmer from Brazil. He had poliomyelitis as a child. He competes in the S10 classification.

He won gold for Brazil at the 2008 Summer Paralympics. He also broke S10 world records in three events, and a Paralympic record in a fourth. He is unbeaten in the men's 400 m freestyle S10 event. He then went on to win and break a world record at the 2012 Summer Paralympics in 50 m freestyle S10, with a time of 23.16 seconds, beating his old record of 23.44 seconds.

As of February 2013, he is S10 world record holder in long course 50, 100 and 200 metre freestyle, 50 and 100 metre butterfly and 50 metre backstroke events.
