= Sarah Louise Rung =

Norwegian Paralympic swimmer

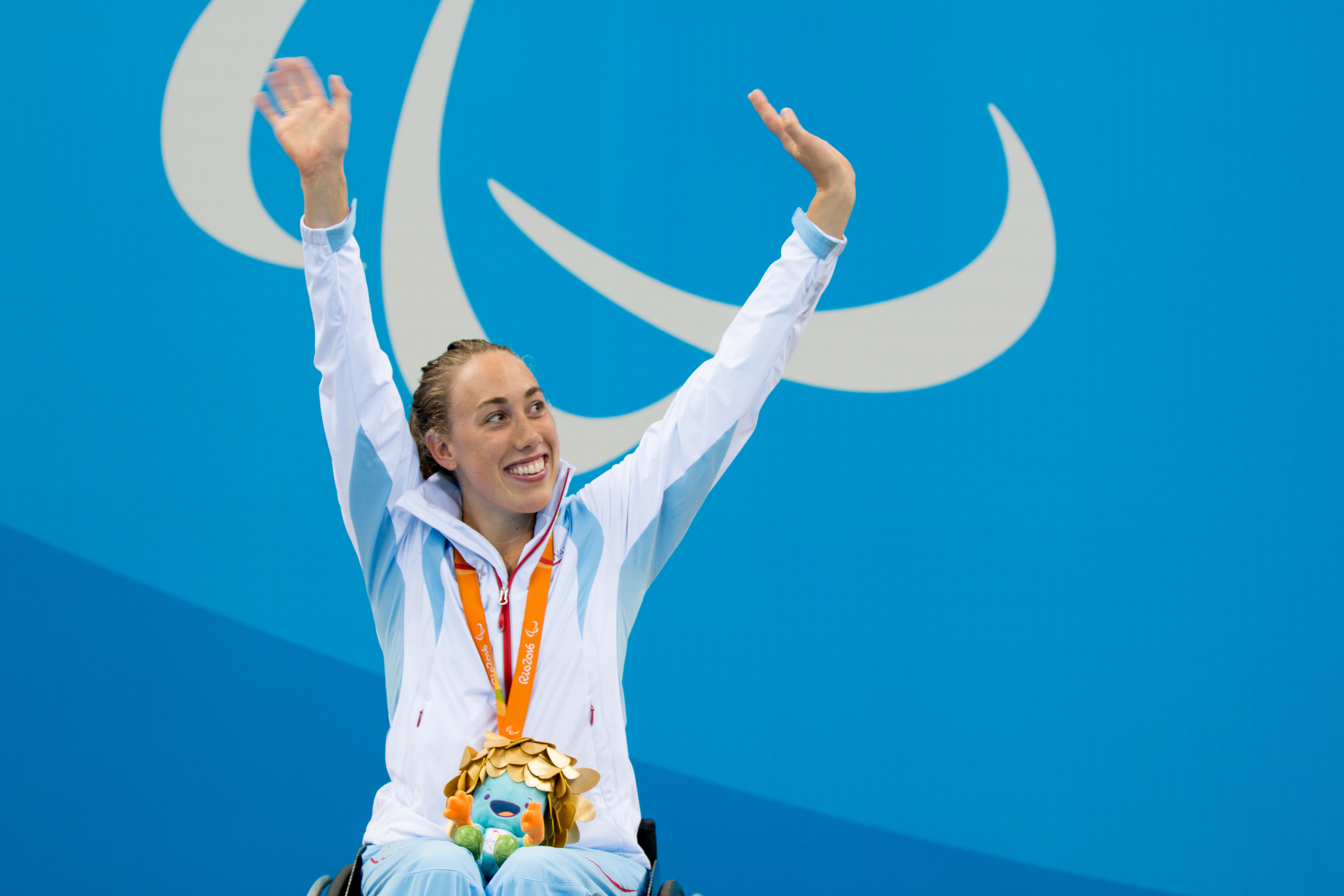

Personal information
- Full name: Sarah Louise Rung
- Nationality: Norwegian
- Born: 8 October 1989 (age 36) Stavanger, Norway

Sport
- Sport: Swimming
- Club: Madla
Medal record
Women's para swimming
Representing Norway
Paralympic Games
Gold medal – first place	2012 London	200 m freestyle
Gold medal – first place	2012 London	50 m butterfly
Gold medal – first place	2016 Rio de Janeiro	100 m breaststroke
Gold medal – first place	2016 Rio de Janeiro	200 m medley
Silver medal – second place	2012 London	100 m breaststroke
Silver medal – second place	2012 London	200 m medley
Silver medal – second place	2016 Rio de Janeiro	50 m butterfly
Bronze medal – third place	2016 Rio de Janeiro	200 m freestyle
Bronze medal – third place	2016 Rio de Janeiro	50 m backstroke
World Championships (Short Course)
Silver medal – second place	2009 Brazil	400 m freestyle
World Championships
Gold medal – first place	2010 Eindhoven	50 m butterfly
Gold medal – first place	2010 Eindhoven	200 m freestyle
Gold medal – first place	2010 Eindhoven	100 m breaststroke
Gold medal – first place	2013 Montreal	200 m freestyle
Gold medal – first place	2013 Montreal	100 m breaststroke
Gold medal – first place	2013 Montreal	50 m butterfly
Gold medal – first place	2013 Montreal	200 m medley
Gold medal – first place	2015 Glasgow	200 m freestyle S5
Gold medal – first place	2015 Glasgow	200 m butterfly S5
Gold medal – first place	2015 Glasgow	100 m breaststroke SB4
Gold medal – first place	2015 Glasgow	200m medley SM5
Silver medal – second place	2010 Eindhoven	100 m freestyle
Bronze medal – third place	2013 Montreal	100 m freestyle
Bronze medal – third place	2015 Glasgow	50 m backstroke S5
European Championships
Gold medal – first place	Berlin 2011	50 m butterfly
Gold medal – first place	Berlin 2011	100 m breaststroke
Gold medal – first place	Berlin 2011	200 m freestyle
Gold medal – first place	Berlin 2011	200 m individual medley
Gold medal – first place	2014 Eindhoven	100m breaststroke SB4
Gold medal – first place	2016 Funchal	100 m freestyle S5
Gold medal – first place	2016 Funchal	200 m freestyle S5
Gold medal – first place	2016 Funchal	100 m breaststroke SB4
Gold medal – first place	2016 Funchal	50 m butterfly S5
Gold medal – first place	2016 Funchal	200m medley SM5
Silver medal – second place	2014 Eindhoven	50 m backstroke S5
Silver medal – second place	2014 Eindhoven	100m freestyle S5
Silver medal – second place	2014 Eindhoven	4X50m medley relay 20pts
Bronze medal – third place	2009 Reykjavik	100 m freestyle – S6
Bronze medal – third place	2009 Reykjavik	400 m freestyle – S6
Bronze medal – third place	2016 Funchal	50 m backstroke S5

Sarah Louise Rung (born 8 October 1989 in Stavanger) is a Paralympic swimmer of Norway. She became a wheelchair user after a back surgery in 2008. She won two gold medals and two silver medals at the 2012 Summer Paralympics in London. She also has several medals from both World- and European Championships. 2012 Summer Paralympics.

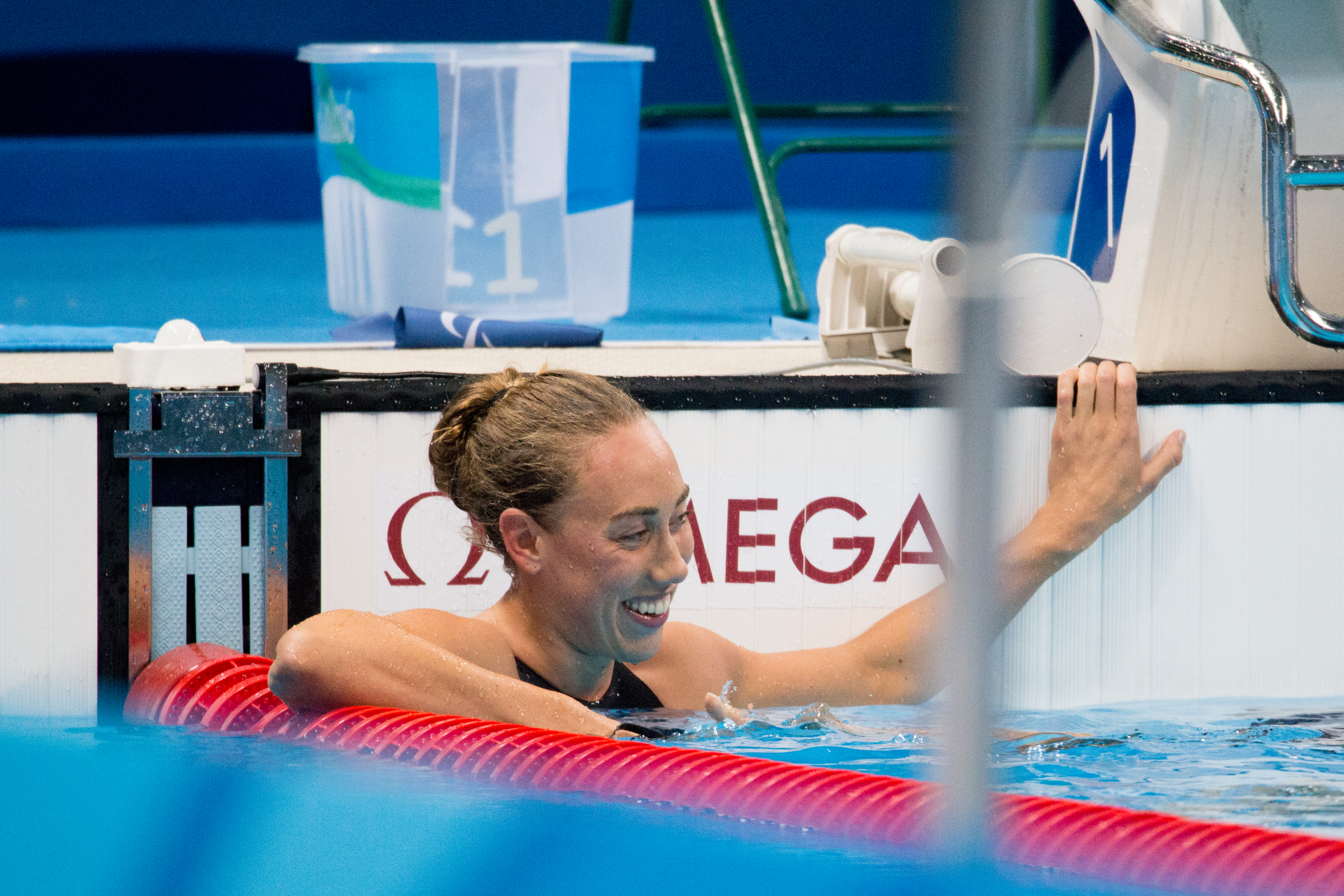
After the 50m butterfly at the 2012 Paralympics
