= Tully Kearney =

British Paralympic swimmer (born 1997)

Tully Kearney OBE
Personal information
- Full name: Tully Alicia Jacqueline Kearney
- Nationality: British
- Born: 11 April 1997 (age 29) Nottingham, England
- Height: 1.70 m (5 ft 7 in)

Sport
- Sport: Swimming
- Strokes: Freestyle, backstroke, butterfly
- Classifications: S5 due to dystonia in lower body
- Club: Loughborough University Swimming Club (Coach: Andy Wallace)
- College team: Manchester Metropolitan University
Medal record
Women's para swimming
Representing Great Britain
Paralympic Games
Gold medal – first place	2020 Tokyo	100 m freestyle S5
Gold medal – first place	2024 Paris	100 m freestyle S5
Gold medal – first place	2024 Paris	200 m freestyle S5
Silver medal – second place	2020 Tokyo	200 m freestyle S5
World Championships
Gold medal – first place	2015 Glasgow	100m butterfly S9
Gold medal – first place	2015 Glasgow	400m freestyle S9
Gold medal – first place	2015 Glasgow	200m medley SM9
Gold medal – first place	2015 Glasgow	4 x 100-metre medley 34pts
Gold medal – first place	2019 London	50m freestyle S5
Gold medal – first place	2019 London	100m freestyle S5
Gold medal – first place	2019 London	200m freestyle S5
Gold medal – first place	2022 Madeira	50m freestyle S5
Gold medal – first place	2022 Madeira	100m freestyle S5
Gold medal – first place	2022 Madeira	200m freestyle S5
Silver medal – second place	2015 Glasgow	100m backstroke S9
Bronze medal – third place	2013 Montreal	400m freestyle S10
Bronze medal – third place	2015 Glasgow	4x100 freestyle relay 34pts
European Championships
Gold medal – first place	2018 Dublin	100m freestyle S5
Bronze medal – third place	2018 Dublin	50m freestyle S5

Tully Alicia Jacqueline Kearney (born 11 April 1997) is a British Paralympic swimmer. Kearney currently competes in the S5/SB4/SM5 classification for swimmers with physical disabilities. She won gold and silver at the Tokyo 2020 Paralympic Games and followed this up at the Paris 2024 Games with two further gold medals, including retaining her 100 m freestyle S5 title. Since first competing at the World Para Swimming Championships in 2013 she has won thirteen World Championship medals, ten of which are gold. Kearney is a multiple British, European and World record holder.

== Early and personal life ==
Kearney was born in Nottingham, England in 1997 and grew up in Aldridge.

She was born with cerebral palsy (spastic diplegia) and developed generalised dystonia, a progressive neurological movement disorder, in her mid teens. These conditions primarily affect her lower limbs and also her left arm, wrist, hand, both shoulders and trunk. Kearney was further diagnosed with scoliosis in 2019. She is a patron of Dystonia UK and works to raise awareness of the disorder. She is also an ambassador for CP Sport.

She attended The Cooper and Jordan School in Aldridge, where one of her fellow pupils was future Paralympic gold medallist Ellie Simmonds. She continued her education at the age of 14 as a weekly boarder at Royal Wolverhampton School, having got a scholarship to join their swimming team. Kearney studied for her A-Levels at The Streetly Academy. In 2019, Kearney graduated from Manchester Metropolitan University with a BSc (Hons.) degree in physiology. She began a master's degree course in human physiology at her alma mater, but had to give this up after a head injury in 2023 resulted in post-concussion syndrome and a deterioration of her dystonia. Kearney has been open about how this affected her mental health.

== Career ==
=== Career beginnings ===
Kearney began swimming at the age of eight after being approached by a coach while she watched her older brother train at a local club. She decided to take up swimming competitively after being inspired by Ellie Simmonds, who displayed her medals from the 2008 Paralympics at a school assembly. Kearney joined Boldmere Swimming Club in 2010 and was coached by Ashley Cox. Then classified as a S10, SB9 and SM10 swimmer, she competed in national youth competitions at the age of 14, winning gold in seven events at the 2011 DSE (Disability Sports Events) Championships in Sheffield.

=== 2011 – 2013: First international competitions ===
In 2011, Kearney was selected for and competed in the 25th German Open Meet in Berlin – her first international competition. In her age group events she took seven medals and added a further three (one gold in the SM10 200m individual medley and two silvers in the S10 200m and 400m freestyles) in the open age events. The 2011/12 season saw Kearney selected as a World Class Development Funded Athlete by British Disability Swimming, under the coaching of Nathan Hilton.

At the 2013 British International Disability Swim Championships, held in Sheffield, Kearney twice broke the British record for the 100m S10 backstroke; first during the heats, then again in the final. She also recorded personal best times in three other events. Her performance on that day earned her a place on the British team competing at the 2013 IPC Swimming World Championships in Montreal. Kearney entered five different events at the World Championships and won bronze in the women's 400 m Freestyle S10 behind France's Elodie Lorandi and Canada's Aurelie Rivard.

=== 2014 – 2015 ===
An illness during the British national trials in 2014 resulted in Kearney missing out on places at both the Commonwealth Games in Glasgow and the European Championships in Eindhoven. Her first event back in the pool, having recovered from her illness, was as part of National Paralympic Day at the London Aquatics Centre, where she won the multi-classification 400m freestyle.

In 2015, Kearney qualified to represent Great Britain at the 2015 IPC Swimming World Championships in Glasgow. Due to her progressive disability, Kearney was reclassified before the trials as a S9, SB8 and SM9 swimmer. She entered seven events, including the freestyle relay and medley relay team events. She took home six medals in total, four of them gold (in the medley relay, 100m butterfly (S9), 200m individual medley (SM9) and 400m freestyle (S9)). She took bronze in the freestyle relay, and silver in the 100m backstroke S9, behind a world record-breaking swim from Australia's Ellie Cole. Kearney set three European records in Glasgow: in the 400 m freestyle S9, 100 m butterfly S9, and 200 m individual medley SM9. Kearney was Great Britain's top medal earner at these championships, and, following this success, she was promoted from the World Class Podium Potential programme to the Podium programme for the 2015/16 season.

=== 2016 – 2017 ===
Kearney was selected for the 2016 Paralympic Games in Rio de Janeiro but was forced to withdraw just two weeks before the Games due to battling a significant progression of her generalised dystonia, coupled with an ongoing shoulder injury. As a result of this uncertainty in her career, she lost her position at the National Performance Centre in Manchester and lost her funding. She took a year out from swimming and focused on university.

She returned to the pool in 2017 and was reclassified as a S7, SB6 and SM7 swimmer at the British Para Swimming International Meet in April of that year due to the further progression of her disability.

=== 2018 – 2020 ===
2018 saw a revision of the World Para Swimming Classification system; thus, Kearney was reclassified as a S5, SB4 and SM5 swimmer. She returned to international competition at the World Para Swimming European Championships in Dublin, winning gold in the 100 m freestyle S5 and bronze in the 50 m freestyle S5. She ended the year ranked number one in the World in three events. In recognition of her success, she was reinstated onto the World Class Podium Potential Programme for the 2018/19 season.

Kearney competed at the 2019 World Championships in London, where she became triple World Champion after winning gold in the 50 m freestyle S5, 100 m freestyle S5 and 200 m freestyle S5, all in British record times. She again ended the year ranked number one in the world in these three events. In recognition of this success she was moved to the World Class Podium Programme for the 2019/20 season.

=== 2021 – 2022: First Paralympic Games and further World Championship success ===
In July 2021 Kearney was named as a member of the ParalympicsGB squad that would compete at the postponed 2020 Paralympics in Tokyo. She competed in two events and medalled in both: gold in the 100 m freestyle S5 and silver in the 200 m freestyle S5.

In 2022 she became triple World Champion for a second time at the World Championships in Madeira, additionally achieving World Records in all three events.

Kearney was not selected for the 2022 Commonwealth Games as lower disability classifications typically aren't included. She did, however, volunteer at the Games, as they were her home games in Birmingham. She has shared that this "incredible experience" gave her "massive appreciation for all the volunteers" who are essential in ensuring that large-scale sports events can go ahead. Kearney also criticised the accessibility of the Games, as designated blue badge parking was located too far away for physically disabled spectators and volunteers to comfortably access some venues.

=== 2023 – 2024: Injury and Paris Paralympic Games ===
Kearney was forced to withdraw from the 2023 World Championships due to a significant head injury which resulted in post-concussion syndrome. Although not fully recovered at the time of the Championships, Kearney was named to the team and attempted to compete but collapsed after her first race. The injury also triggered a further deterioration of her dystonia, particularly affecting her left arm, hand and wrist, as well as her shoulders and legs. Kearney has spoken about the impact that the head injury has had on her life, both physically and mentally; not only did it disrupt her swimming career, but the effects on her memory, vestibular system and eye tracking resulted in her having to withdraw from her master's degree course.

After what Kearney has described as an "18-month battle" following her injury, she was selected for the ParalympicsGB team that competed at the Paris 2024 Games, one of only two reigning swimming champions to be selected.

== Honours and awards ==
Kearney won the Junior Sportsperson of the Year award at the 2014 Birmingham Sports Awards. She has stated that the award means a lot to her as it was contended by both able-bodied and parasport athletes.

I really feel that able-bodied sports and para-sports should be treated equally, and last night I really felt like they were.

— Kearney after winning Junior Sportsperson of the Year at the Birmingham Sports Awards in 2014.

In 2015, Kearney was one of the final three athletes to have been shortlisted for Young Sports Personality of the Year at the 2015 BBC Sports Personality of the Year awards. She was a runner-up alongside jockey Tom Marquand; the eventual winner was gymnast Ellie Downie.

She was named Birmingham Amateur Sportsperson of the Year in 2019. That same year, Kearney was also awarded a Pride of Sport Award in recognition of her fight to return to competitive swimming following the progression of her dystonia at the end of 2015.

Kearney was appointed Member of the Order of the British Empire (MBE) in the 2022 New Year Honours for services to swimming. She was further appointed Officer of the Order of the British Empire (OBE) in the 2025 New Year Honours.

== See also ==
- Swimming at the 2020 Summer Paralympics
- Swimming at the 2024 Summer Paralympics
