= 2019 World Para Swimming Championships – Women's 200 metre freestyle =

The women's 200m freestyle events at the 2019 World Para Swimming Championships were held in the London Aquatics Centre at the Queen Elizabeth Olympic Park in London between 9–15 September.

== Medalists ==
Event	Gold	Silver	Bronze
S5	Tully Kearney; Great Britain	Arianna Talamona; Italy	Monica Boggioni; Italy
S14	Valeriia Shabalina; Russia	Bethany Firth; Great Britain	Jessica-Jane Applegate; Great Britain
