= 2015 IPC Swimming World Championships =

7th IPC Swimming World Championships
- Host city: Glasgow, United Kingdom
- Date: 13 – 19 July
- Venue: Tollcross International Swimming Centre
- Nations: 70
- Athletes: 580

The 2015 IPC Swimming World Championships was the eighth IPC Swimming World Championships, an international swimming competition for athletes with a disability. It was held in Glasgow, United Kingdom and took place from 13 to 19 July. Around 580 athletes from around 70 countries competed at the games, with Russia topping the tables with most gold medals and medals won. The event was held at the Tollcross International Swimming Centre located within Tollcross Park in Glasgow. Initially awarded as the IPC Swimming European Championships, the event was upgraded to a World Championship after a change to the IPC calendar.

This proved to be the final event branded as the "IPC Swimming World Championships". On 30 November 2016, the IPC, which serves as the international federation for 10 disability sports, including swimming, adopted the "World Para" brand for all 10 sports. The world championship events in all of these sports were immediately rebranded as "World Para" championships. Accordingly, future IPC swimming championship events will be known as the "World Para Swimming Championships".

== Venue ==

The Championship was staged at the Tollcross International Swimming Centre located at Tollcross, Glasgow. The venue possesses a 10 lane competition class swimming pool, and after a £13.7 million upgrade in 2013, a six lane 50 meter warm-up pool was added.

== Events ==
=== Classification ===
Athletes are allocated a classification for each event based upon their disability to allow fairer competition between athletes of similar ability. The classifications for swimming are:

- Visual impairment
  - S11-S13
- Intellectual impairment
  - S14
- Other disability
  - S1-S10 (Freestyle, backstroke and butterfly)
  - SB1-SB9 (breaststroke)
  - SM1-SM10 (individual medley)

Classifications run from S1 (severely disabled) to S10 (minimally disabled) for athletes with physical disabilities, and S11 (totally blind) to S13 (legally blind) for visually impaired athletes. Blind athletes must use blackened goggles.

=== Schedule ===
Finals

Date →		13 Jul	14 Jul	15 Jul	16 Jul	17 Jul	18 Jul	19 Jul
50m Freestyle	Men; Details	S13; S10	S4		S9; S6; S3	S11; S5	S12	S8; S7
50m Freestyle	Women; Details	S13; S10	S4		S9; S6	S11; S5	S12	S8; S7
100m Freestyle	Men; Details	S7; S11	S9		S8; S4		S10; S13	S6; S5
100m Freestyle	Women; Details	S7; S11	S9; S3		S8		S10; S13	S6; S5
200m freestyle	Men; Details	S3; S4		S5; S14			S2	
200m freestyle	Women; Details			S5; S14				
400m freestyle	Men; Details	S6	S11	S7	S13	S8	S9	S10
400m freestyle	Women; Details	S6	S11	S7	S13	S8	S9	S10
50m backstroke	Men; Details	S5			S1		S3	S2; S4
50m backstroke	Women; Details	S5					S3	S2; S4
100m backstroke	Men; Details	S9	S1; S2	S11; S13; S12	S10		S6; S7; S8	S14
100m backstroke	Women; Details	S9	S2	S11; S13; S12	S10		S6; S7; S8	S14
50m breaststroke	Men; Details					SB2; SB3		
50m breaststroke	Women; Details					SB3		
100m breaststroke	Men; Details	SB14	SB5; SB6; SB7; SB8	SB9	SB12	SB13	SB4; SB11	
100m breaststroke	Women; Details	SB14	SB5; SB6; SB7; SB8	SB9		SB13	SB4; SB11	
50m butterfly	Men; Details			S6	S5	S7		
50m butterfly	Women; Details			S6	S5	S7		
100m butterfly	Men; Details	S8				S10; S9		S13; S11
100m butterfly	Women; Details	S8				S10; S9		S13
150m medley	Men; Details			SM3; SM4				
150m medley	Women; Details			SM4				
200m medley	Men; Details		SM13; SM10	SM8	SM11; SM7	SM6; SM14		SM9
200m medley	Women; Details		SM13; SM10	SM8	SM11; SM7	SM6; SM14	SM5	SM9
4×50m freestyle relays	Mixed; Details	20pts						
4 × 100 m freestyle relays	Men; Details					34pts		
4 × 100 m freestyle relays	Women; Details				34pts			
4 × 100 m medley relays	Men; Details						34pts	
4 × 100 m medley relays	Women; Details							34pts

== Medal table ==
The medal table at the end of the championship.

* Host nation (Great Britain)

Rank	Nation	Gold	Silver	Bronze	Total
1	Russia (RUS)	32	19	20	71
2	Ukraine (UKR)	21	27	15	63
3	United States (USA)	11	11	8	30
4	Brazil (BRA)	11	8	4	23
5	Great Britain (GBR)*	10	12	10	32
6	China (CHN)	10	11	8	29
7	Australia (AUS)	9	8	13	30
8	New Zealand (NZL)	8	6	2	16
9	Belarus (BLR)	7	1	1	9
10	Netherlands (NED)	6	3	6	15
11	Spain (ESP)	4	7	11	22
12	Norway (NOR)	4	2	3	9
13	Italy (ITA)	3	6	2	11
14	Canada (CAN)	2	5	5	12
15	Germany (GER)	2	4	5	11
16	Japan (JPN)	2	4	1	7
17	Mexico (MEX)	2	3	5	10
18	Colombia (COL)	2	2	0	4
18	South Korea (KOR)	2	2	0	4
20	Sweden (SWE)	1	1	2	4
21	South Africa (RSA)	1	0	2	3
22	Cyprus (CYP)	1	0	0	1
22	Thailand (THA)	1	0	0	1
24	Azerbaijan (AZE)	0	2	3	5
25	France (FRA)	0	2	2	4
26	Israel (ISR)	0	2	1	3
27	Poland (POL)	0	1	5	6
28	Greece (GRE)	0	1	3	4
29	Vietnam (VIE)	0	1	1	2
30	Czech Republic (CZE)	0	1	0	1
30	Iceland (ISL)	0	1	0	1
32	Hungary (HUN)	0	0	3	3
32	Kazakhstan (KAZ)	0	0	3	3
34	Ireland (IRL)	0	0	2	2
35	Argentina (ARG)	0	0	1	1
35	Austria (AUT)	0	0	1	1
35	Croatia (CRO)	0	0	1	1
35	Portugal (POR)	0	0	1	1
35	Turkey (TUR)	0	0	1	1
35	Uzbekistan (UZB)	0	0	1	1
Totals (40 entries)		152	153	152	457

=== Multiple medallists ===
Many competitors won multiple medals at the 2015 Championships. The following athletes won five gold medals or more.

Name	Country	Medal	Event
Daniel Dias	Brazil	Gold; Gold; Gold; Gold; Gold; Gold; Gold; Silver	50m freestyle - S5; 100m freestyle - S5; 200m freestyle - S5; 50m backstroke - S5; 100m breaststroke - SB4; Mixed 4x50m freestyle relay 20pts 50m butterfly - S5; 4 × 100 m freestyle relay 34pts
Ihar Boki	Belarus	Gold; Gold; Gold; Gold; Gold; Gold; Silver	100m backstroke - S13; 100m butterfly - S13; 100m freestyle - S13; 200m medley - SM13; 400m freestyle - S13; 50m freestyle - S13; 100m breaststroke - SB13
Denis Tarasov	Russia	Gold; Gold; Gold; Gold; Gold	100m butterfly - S8; 100m freestyle - S8; 50m freestyle - S13; 4 × 100 m freestyle relay 34pts 4 × 100 m medley relay 34pts

== Records ==
Multiple world and continental records were broken during the competition. The below table lists the number of records broken by country.

Legend

WR: World record, CR: Championship record, AF: Africa record, AM: Americas record, AS: Asian record, EU: European record, OS: Oceania record

New Records
Nation	WR	CR	AF	AM	AS	EU	OC
Australia	3						19
Belarus	4						
Brazil	1	4		5			
Canada		1		7			
China	3	4			17		
Colombia	1			4			
Egypt			1				
Kazakhstan		1					
Italy		1				2	
Indonesia					1		
Israel		1					
Japan		3					
Germany		1					
Great Britain	2	2				6	
Greece		1					
Mexico	1	1		5			
Mauritius		1					
Netherlands	4	1					
Norway		2					
New Zealand		4					3
Poland						1	
Russia	10	4					
South Africa		1	5				
South Korea		2					
Sweden	1						
United States	3	5					
Ukraine	3	5				5	
Uzbekistan					5		
Vietnam					2		
Total	36	44	6	21	25	14	22

== Footnotes ==
Notes
