= Tollcross International Swimming Centre =

Sports venue in Glasgow, Scotland

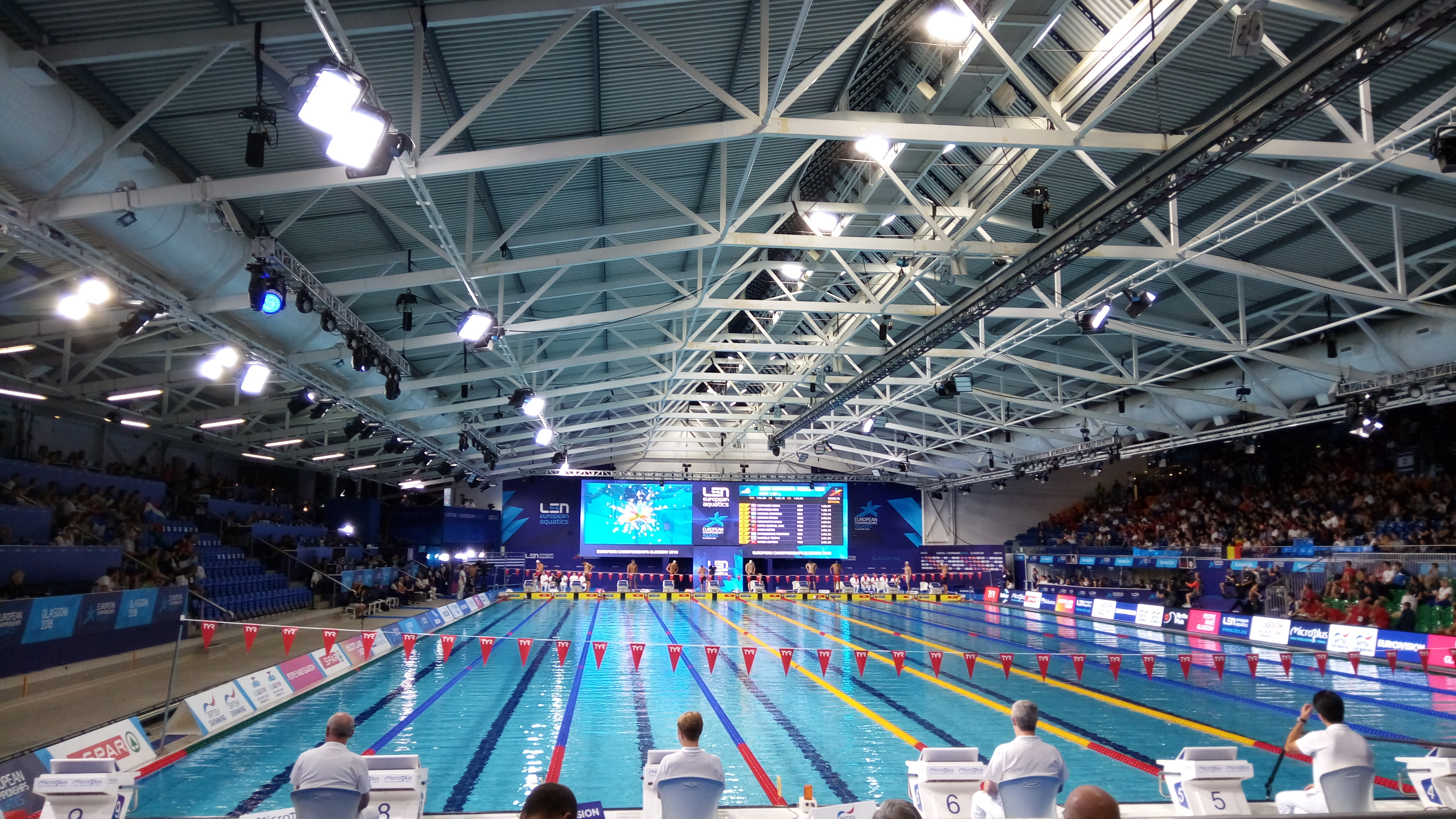
- Interactive map of Tollcross International Swimming Centre
- Former names: East End Leisure Centre; Tollcross Park Leisure Centre
- Location: Tollcross, Glasgow; Scotland
- Coordinates: 55°50′44.2″N 4°10′38.18″W
- Owner: Glasgow City Council
- Capacity: 2,000 (permanent); 5,000 (temporary)

Construction
- Opened: 1997, 2013
- Expanded: 2013
- Cost: £14m (refurbishment)
- General contractor: Barr Construction

Tenants
- 2014 Commonwealth Games; 2015 IPC Swimming World Championships; 2018 European Aquatics Championships; 2018 European Sports Championships

The Tollcross International Swimming Centre is a swimming pool and leisure centre in Glasgow. It hosted the Swimming events at the 2014 Commonwealth Games, and hosted it once more in 2026. The centre hosted the IPC Swimming World Championships during July 2015.

== Technical features ==
It has one Olympic standard 50 metre swimming pool, which was extensively upgraded, and a second 50-metre pool which was added as a warm-up facility. The pool was reopened on 24 May 2013. The seating capacity of the Pool is 2,000, rising to 5,000 with temporary seating during the Commonwealth Games. Additional upgrades were made in 2017 in preparation for the 2018 European Aquatics Championships, which included repairs, a new roof, and electrical and mechanical equipment additions.

== Notable events ==
- British Swimming Championships: 2014, 2016, 2019
- British Swimming Glasgow Meet: 2021
- Commonwealth Games: 2014, 2026
- Duel in the Pool: 2013
- European Aquatics Championships: 2018
- European Short Course Swimming Championships: 2019
- European Sports Championships: 2018
- World Para Swimming Championships: 2015
