= Swimming at the 2016 Summer Paralympics – Men's 50 metre freestyle S3 =

Men's 50 metre freestyle S3 at the XV Paralympic Games
- Venue: Olympic Aquatics Stadium
- Dates: 13 September 2016
- Competitors: 11 from 9 nations

Medalists
1st place, gold medalist(s)		Wenpan Huang	China
2nd place, silver medalist(s)		Dmytro Vynohradets	Ukraine
3rd place, bronze medalist(s)		Hanhua Li	China

The Men's 50 metre freestyle S3 event at the 2016 Paralympic Games took place on 13 September 2016, at the Olympic Aquatics Stadium. Two heats were held. The swimmers with the eight fastest times advanced to the final.

== Heats ==
=== Heat 1 ===
11:42 13 September 2016:

Rank	Lane	Name	Nationality	Time	Notes
1	5	Vincenzo Boni	Italy	47.03	Q
2	4	Hanhua Li	China	50.55	Q
3	6	Mikael Fredriksson	Sweden	52.26	Q
4	3	Ioannis Kostakis	Greece	55.45	Q
5	2	Alberto Abarza	Chile	58.17	

=== Heat 2 ===
11:46 13 September 2016:

Rank	Lane	Name	Nationality	Time	Notes
1	4	Wenpan Huang	China	40.51	WR Q
2	5	Dmytro Vynohradets	Ukraine	42.92	Q
3	3	Jianping Du	China	46.95	Q
4	6	Miguel Angel Martinez Tajuelo	Spain	51.09	Q
5	2	Cristopher Tronco	Mexico	1:02.10	
6	7	Gideon Nasilowski	Namibia	1:38.21	

== Final ==
20:22 13 September 2016:

Rank	Lane	Name	Nationality	Time	Notes
1st place, gold medalist(s)	4	Wenpan Huang	China	39.24	WR
2nd place, silver medalist(s)	5	Dmytro Vynohradets	Ukraine	41.41	
3rd place, bronze medalist(s)	2	Hanhua Li	China	42.18	
4	3	Jianping Du	China	45.62	
5	6	Vincenzo Boni	Italy	47.32	
6	7	Miguel Angel Martinez Tajuelo	Spain	50.90	
7	8	Ioannis Kostakis	Greece	53.95	
8	1	Mikael Fredriksson	Sweden	55.74	
