= Swimming at the 2016 Summer Paralympics – Men's 50 metre backstroke =

The men's 50 m backstroke swimming events for the 2016 Summer Paralympics took place at the Olympic Aquatics Stadium from 8 to 17 September. A total of eleven events were contested for different classifications.

== Competition format ==
Each event consisted of two rounds: heats and final. The top eight swimmers overall in the heats progressed to the final. If there were fewer than eight swimmers in an event, no heats were held and all swimmers qualify for the final.

== Results ==
=== S1 ===
19:36 15 September 2016:

Rank	Lane	Name	Nationality	Time	Notes
1st place, gold medalist(s)	4	Hennadii Boiko	Ukraine	1:00.85	
2nd place, silver medalist(s)	5	Francesco Bettella	Italy	1:12.49	
3rd place, bronze medalist(s)	3	Anton Kol	Ukraine	1:15.42	
4	6	Christos Tampaxis	Greece	1:22.30	
5	2	Dimitrios Karypidis	Greece	1:32.09	
6	1	Luis Rojas Osorno	Colombia	1:46.67	

=== S2 ===
19:44 15 September 2016:

Rank	Lane	Name	Nationality	Time	Notes
1st place, gold medalist(s)	5	Liankang Zou	China	47.17	WR
2nd place, silver medalist(s)	4	Benying Liu	China	48.84	
3rd place, bronze medalist(s)	3	Serhii Palamarchuk	Ukraine	50.23	
4	6	Yang Yang	China	57.27	
5	8	Ievgen Panibratets	Ukraine	1:00.03	
6	7	Jacek Czech	Poland	1:01.91	
7	1	Aristeidis Makrodimitris	Greece	1:03.46	
8	2	Roman Bondarenko	Ukraine	1:03.89	

=== S3 ===
18:24 10 September 2016:

Rank	Lane	Name	Nationality	Time	Notes
1st place, gold medalist(s)	4	Dmytro Vynohradets	Ukraine	44.94	
2nd place, silver medalist(s)	6	Wenpan Huang	China	46.11	
3rd place, bronze medalist(s)	5	Vincenzo Boni	Italy	46.67	
4	3	Jianping Du	China	47.02	
5	7	Hanhua Li	China	51.48	
6	2	Miguel Angel Martinez Tajuelo	Spain	52.87	
7	8	Mikael Fredriksson	Sweden	56.53	
8	1	Alberto Abarza	Chile	57.93	

=== S4 ===
18:23 16 September 2016:

Rank	Lane	Name	Nationality	Time	Notes
1st place, gold medalist(s)	4	Arnost Petracek	Czech Republic	43.12	
2nd place, silver medalist(s)	5	Yuntao Liu	China	45.01	
3rd place, bronze medalist(s)	3	Jesús Hernández Hernández	Mexico	45.30	
4	6	Juan Reyes	Mexico	45.46	
5	7	Jan Povysil	Czech Republic	46.21	
6	2	Gustavo Sanchez Martinez	Mexico	49.41	
7	1	Ronystony Cordeiro	Brazil	50.84	
8	8	Efrem Morelli	Italy	52.54	

=== S5 ===
19:51 16 September 2016:

Rank	Lane	Name	Nationality	Time	Notes
1st place, gold medalist(s)	4	Daniel Dias	Brazil	35.40	
2nd place, silver medalist(s)	5	Andrew Mullen	Great Britain	37.94	
3rd place, bronze medalist(s)	6	Zsolt Vereczkei	Hungary	38.92	
4	3	Thanh Tung Vo	Vietnam	40.13	
5	7	Diego Lopez Diaz	Mexico	40.26	
6	2	Beytullah Eroglu	Turkey	41.31	
7	8	Andrea Massussi	Italy	42.22	
8	1	Cameron Leslie	New Zealand	42.26	
