= Swimming at the 2016 Summer Paralympics – Men's 50 metre backstroke S3 =

Men's 50 metre backstroke S3 at the XV Paralympic Games
- Venue: Olympic Aquatics Stadium
- Dates: 10 September 2016
- Competitors: 10 from 8 nations
- Winning time: 44.94

Medalists
1st place, gold medalist(s)		Dmytro Vynohradets	Ukraine
2nd place, silver medalist(s)		Wenpan Huang	China
3rd place, bronze medalist(s)		Vincenzo Boni	Italy

The Men's 50 metre backstroke S3 event at the 2016 Paralympic Games took place on 10 September 2016, at the Olympic Aquatics Stadium. Two heats were held. The swimmers with the eight fastest times advanced to the final.

== Heats ==
=== Heat 1 ===
10:19 10 September 2016:

Rank	Lane	Name	Nationality	Time	Notes
1	4	Dmytro Vynohradets	Ukraine	45.97	Q
2	5	Miguel Angel Martinez Tajuelo	Spain	51.69	Q
3	3	Hanhua Li	China	55.29	Q
4	6	Alberto Abarza	Chile	56.73	Q
5	2	Ioannis Kostakis	Greece	1:17.35	

=== Heat 2 ===
10:23 10 September 2016:

Rank	Lane	Name	Nationality	Time	Notes
1	4	Vincenzo Boni	Italy	47.16	Q
2	5	Jianping Du	China	47.35	Q
3	3	Wenpan Huang	China	49.24	Q
4	6	Mikael Fredriksson	Sweden	56.91	Q
5	2	Cristopher Tronco	Mexico	1:03.68	

== Final ==
18:24 10 September 2016:

Rank	Lane	Name	Nationality	Time	Notes
1st place, gold medalist(s)	4	Dmytro Vynohradets	Ukraine	44.94	
2nd place, silver medalist(s)	6	Wenpan Huang	China	46.11	
3rd place, bronze medalist(s)	5	Vincenzo Boni	Italy	46.67	
4	3	Jianping Du	China	47.02	
5	7	Hanhua Li	China	51.48	
6	2	Miguel Angel Martinez Tajuelo	Spain	52.87	
7	8	Mikael Fredriksson	Sweden	56.53	
8	1	Alberto Abarza	Chile	57.93	
