= Swimming at the 2016 Summer Paralympics – Men's 200 metre freestyle =

The men's 200 m freestyle swimming events for the 2016 Summer Paralympics took place at the Olympic Aquatics Stadium from 8 to 17 September. A total of eleven events were contested for different classifications.

== Competition format ==
Each event consisted of two rounds: heats and final. The top eight swimmers overall in the heats progressed to the final. If there were less than eight swimmers in an event, no heats were held and all swimmers qualify for the final.

== Results ==
=== S2 ===
20:26 11 September 2016:

Rank	Lane	Name	Nationality	Time	Notes
1st place, gold medalist(s)	3	Benying Liu	China	3:41.54	WR
2nd place, silver medalist(s)	4	Liankang Zou	China	3:42.58	
3rd place, bronze medalist(s)	5	Serhii Palamarchuk	Ukraine	3:43.69	
4	6	Yang Yang	China	4:11.20	
5	2	Roman Bondarenko	Ukraine	4:29.80	
6	7	Aristeidis Makrodimitris	Greece	4:57.90	
7	1	Itzhak Mamistvalov	Israel	5:09.96	
8	8	Iad Joseph Shalabi	Israel	5:22.38	

=== S3 ===
18:32 15 September 2016:

Rank	Lane	Name	Nationality	Time	Notes
1st place, gold medalist(s)	4	Wenpan Huang	China	3:09.04	WR
2nd place, silver medalist(s)	5	Dmytro Vynohradets	Ukraine	3:09.77	
3rd place, bronze medalist(s)	3	Hanhua Li	China	3:23.10	
4	6	Vincenzo Boni	Italy	3:30.02	
5	7	Chaowen Huang	China	3:39.41	
6	2	Miguel Angel Martinez Tajuelo	Spain	3:45.19	
7	1	Ioannis Kostakis	Greece	4:01.46	
8	8	Mikael Fredriksson	Sweden	4:17.70	

=== S4 ===
20:30 13 September 2016:

Rank	Lane	Name	Nationality	Time	Notes
1st place, gold medalist(s)	4	Giseong Jo	South Korea	3:01.67	
2nd place, silver medalist(s)	3	Michael Schoenmaker	Netherlands	3:03.81	
3rd place, bronze medalist(s)	1	Zhipeng Jin	China	3:03.94	
4	5	Darko Duric	Slovenia	3:05.02	
5	6	David Smetanine	France	3:06.39	
6	2	Gustavo Sanchez Martinez	Mexico	3:10.58	
7	7	Jan Povysil	Czech Republic	3:15.72	
8	8	Andrii Derevinskyi	Ukraine	3:17.53	

=== S5 ===
19:59 8 September 2016:

Rank	Lane	Name	Nationality	Time	Notes
1st place, gold medalist(s)	4	Daniel Dias	Brazil	2:27.88	
2nd place, silver medalist(s)	5	Roy Perkins	United States	2:38.56	
3rd place, bronze medalist(s)	3	Andrew Mullen	Great Britain	2:40.65	
4	6	Theo Curin	France	2:44.79	
5	8	Sebastian Rodriguez	Spain	2:50.53	
6	7	James Scully	Ireland	2:51.45	
7	1	Giovanni Sciaccaluga	Italy	2:51.63	
8	2	Cameron Leslie	New Zealand	2:52.10	

=== S14 ===
18:29 11 September 2016:

Rank	Lane	Name	Nationality	Time	Notes
1st place, gold medalist(s)	3	Wai Lok Tang	Hong Kong	1:56.32	PR
2nd place, silver medalist(s)	5	Thomas Hamer	Great Britain	1:56.58	
3rd place, bronze medalist(s)	4	Daniel Fox	Australia	1:56.69	
4	2	Jon Margeir Sverrisson	Iceland	1:57.50	
5	6	Liam Schluter	Australia	1:59.38	
6	7	Keichi Nakajima	Japan	2:00.61	
7	1	Won Sang Cho	South Korea	2:00.83	
8	8	Felipe Vila Real	Brazil	2:02.33	
