= Swimming at the 2016 Summer Paralympics – Men's 150 metre individual medley =

Men's 150 metre individual medley swimming events for the 2016 Summer Paralympics

The men's 150 metre individual medley swimming events for the 2016 Summer Paralympics took place at the Olympic Aquatics Stadium from 8 to 17 September. A total of eleven events were contested for different classifications.

== Competition format ==
Each event consisted of two rounds: heats and final. The top eight swimmers overall in the heats progressed to the final. If there were less than eight swimmers in an event, no heats were held and all swimmers qualify for the final.

== Results ==
=== SM3 ===
20:19 16 September 2016:

Rank	Lane	Name	Nationality	Time	Notes
1st place, gold medalist(s)	3	Wenpan Huang	China	2:40.19	WR
2nd place, silver medalist(s)	4	Dmytro Vynohradets	Ukraine	2:40.75	
3rd place, bronze medalist(s)	6	Jianping Du	China	2:52.32	
4	5	Tingshen Li	China	2:55.29	
5	2	Somchai Doungkaew	Thailand	3:06.25	
6	7	Arnulfo Castorena	Mexico	3:10.84	
7	1	Mikael Fredriksson	Sweden	3:28.28	
8	8	Cristopher Tronco	Mexico	3:33.76	

=== SM4 ===
17:50 12 September 2016:

Rank	Lane	Name	Nationality	Time	Notes
1st place, gold medalist(s)	4	Cameron Leslie	New Zealand	2:23.12	WR
2nd place, silver medalist(s)	5	Zhipeng Jin	China	2:26.91	
3rd place, bronze medalist(s)	3	Jonas Larsen	Denmark	2:33.67	
4	2	Takayuki Suzuki	Japan	2:38.71	
5	6	Efrem Morelli	Italy	2:43.75	
6	8	Miguel Luque	Spain	2:45.34	
7	7	Jan Povysil	Czech Republic	2:45.79	
8	1	Gustavo Sanchez Martinez	Mexico	2:54.95	
