= Swimming at the 2012 Summer Paralympics – Men's 150 metre individual medley SM3 =

Men's 150m Ind. Medley SM3 at the XIV Paralympic Games
- Venue: London Aquatics Centre
- Dates: 2 September
- Competitors: 15 from 12 nations
- Winning time: 2:43.72

Medalists
1st place, gold medalist(s)		Du Jianping	China
2nd place, silver medalist(s)		Dmytro Vynohradets	Ukraine
3rd place, bronze medalist(s)		Li Hanhua	China

The men's 150m ind. medley SM3 event at the 2012 Summer Paralympics took place at the London Aquatics Centre on 2 September. There were two heats; the swimmers with the eight fastest times advanced to the final.

== Results ==
=== Heats ===
Competed from 11:26.

==== Heat 1 ====
Rank	Lane	Name	Nationality	Time	Notes
1	4	Dmytro Vynohradets	Ukraine	3:01.99	Q, EU
2	3	Christoffer Lindhe	Sweden	3:05.86	Q
3	6	Li Hanhua	China	3:16.94	Q
4	5	Andrey Meshcheryakov	Russia	3:21.78	Q
5	2	Frederic Bussi	France	3:28.17	
6	7	Michael Demarco	United States	3:40.66	
7	1	Ioannis Kostakis	Greece	3:44.18	

==== Heat 2 ====
Rank	Lane	Name	Nationality	Time	Notes
1	4	Du Jianping	China	3:03.69	Q
2	3	Somchai Doungkaew	Thailand	3:08.10	Q
3	7	Min Byeong-eon	South Korea	3:10.18	Q
4	5	Grant Patterson	Australia	3:10.73	Q
5	1	Mikael Fredriksson	Sweden	3:27.11	
6	6	Javier Hernandez Aguiran	Spain	3:30.84	
	2	Arnulfo Castorena	Mexico	DNS	
	8	Cristopher Tronco	Mexico	DNS	

=== Final ===
Competed at 20:01.

Rank	Lane	Name	Nationality	Time	Notes
1st place, gold medalist(s)	5	Du Jianping	China	2:43.72	WR
2nd place, silver medalist(s)	4	Dmytro Vynohradets	Ukraine	2:44.85	EU
3rd place, bronze medalist(s)	1	Li Hanhua	China	3:01.16	
4	3	Christoffer Lindhe	Sweden	3:04.12	
5	6	Somchai Doungkaew	Thailand	3:07.62	
6	7	Grant Patterson	Australia	3:08.66	OC
7	2	Min Byeong-eon	South Korea	3:09.96	
8	8	Andrey Meshcheryakov	Russia	3:13.40	

'Q = qualified for final. WR = World Record. EU = European Record. OC = Oceania Record. DNS = Did not start.
