= Swimming at the 2016 Summer Paralympics – Men's 50 metre freestyle =

The men's 50 m freestyle swimming events for the 2016 Summer Paralympics took place at the Olympic Aquatics Stadium from 8 to 17 September 2016. A total of eleven events were contested for different classifications.

== Competition format ==
Each event consisted of two rounds: heats and final. The top eight swimmers overall in the heats progressed to the final. If there were less than eight swimmers in an event, no heats were held and all swimmers qualify for the final.

== Results ==
=== S3 ===
20:22 13 September 2016:

Rank	Lane	Name	Nationality	Time	Notes
1st place, gold medalist(s)	4	Wenpan Huang	China	39.24	WR
2nd place, silver medalist(s)	5	Dmytro Vynohradets	Ukraine	41.41	
3rd place, bronze medalist(s)	2	Hanhua Li	China	42.18	
4	3	Jianping Du	China	45.62	
5	6	Vincenzo Boni	Italy	47.32	
6	7	Miguel Angel Martinez Tajuelo	Spain	50.90	
7	8	Ioannis Kostakis	Greece	53.95	
8	1	Mikael Fredriksson	Sweden	55.74	

=== S4 ===
18:26 17 September 2016:

Rank	Lane	Name	Nationality	Time	Notes
1st place, gold medalist(s)	4	Jo Giseong	South Korea	39.30	
2nd place, silver medalist(s)	5	David Smetanine	France	40.58	
3rd place, bronze medalist(s)	7	Andrii Derevinskyi	Ukraine	40.94	
4	2	Darko Duric	Slovenia	41.21	
5	8	Arnost Petracek	Czech Republic	41.55	
6	3	Gustavo Sanchez Martinez	Mexico	41.99	
7	1	Jan Povysil	Czech Republic	42.73	
8	6	Ronystony Cordeiro	Brazil	43.51	

=== S5 ===
20:28 12 September 2016:

Rank	Lane	Name	Nationality	Time	Notes
1st place, gold medalist(s)	4	Daniel Dias	Brazil	32.78	
2nd place, silver medalist(s)	5	Vo Thanh Tung	Vietnam	33.94	
3rd place, bronze medalist(s)	3	Roy Perkins	United States	34.42	
4	6	Sebastian Rodriguez	Spain	34.62	
5	7	Andrew Mullen	Great Britain	34.87	
6	2	Shiwei He	China	35.60	
7	8	Clodoaldo Silva	Brazil	36.27	
8	1	Giovanni Sciaccaluga	Italy	36.85	

=== S6 ===
17:44 10 September 2016:

Rank	Lane	Name	Nationality	Time	Notes
1st place, gold medalist(s)	6	Qing Xu	China	28.81	
2nd place, silver medalist(s)	5	Nelson Crispín	Colombia	29.27	
3rd place, bronze medalist(s)	4	Hongguang Jia	China	29.87	
4	3	Lorenzo Perez Escalona	Cuba	30.31	
5	7	Matthew Haanappel	Australia	30.77	
6	2	Oleksandr Komarov	Ukraine	31.06	
7	1	Oscar Osorio Campaz	Colombia	31.25	
8	8	Thijs van Hofweegen	Netherlands	31.27	

=== S7 ===
17:59 9 September 2016:

Rank	Lane	Name	Nationality	Time	Notes
1st place, gold medalist(s)	7	Shiyun Pan	China	27.35	WR
2nd place, silver medalist(s)	6	Ievgenii Bogodaiko	Ukraine	27.64	
3rd place, bronze medalist(s)	5	Carlos Serrano Zárate	Colombia	28.60	
4	4	Matthew Levy	Australia	28.68	
5	3	Jingang Wang	China	29.50	
6	2	Jonathan Fox	Great Britain	29.52	
7	8	Michael Jones	Great Britain	29.82	
8	1	Tobias Pollap	Germany	30.04	

=== S8 ===
17:57 16 September 2016:

Rank	Lane	Name	Nationality	Time	Notes
1st place, gold medalist(s)	4	Yinan Wang	China	26.24	
2nd place, silver medalist(s)	6	Bohdan Hrynenko	Ukraine	26.67	
3rd place, bronze medalist(s)	5	Iurii Bozhynskyi	Ukraine	26.75	
4	7	Charles Rozoy	France	27.17	
5	3	Maodang Song	China	27.25	
6	2	Josef Craig	Great Britain	27.27	
7	1	Guanglong Yang	China	27.43	
8	8	Zack McAllister	Canada	27.73	

=== S9 ===
19:49 13 September 2016:

Rank	Lane	Name	Nationality	Time	Notes
1st place, gold medalist(s)	4	Matthew Wylie	Great Britain	25.95	
2nd place, silver medalist(s)	5	Timothy Disken	Australia	25.99	
3rd place, bronze medalist(s)	6	Takuro Yamada	Japan	26.00	
4	7	Tamás Sors	Hungary	26.04	
5	3	Jose Antonio Mari Alcaraz	Spain	26.11	
6	2	Tamás Tóth	Hungary	26.18	
7	8	Ruiter Silva	Brazil	26.62	
8	1	Ryan Crouch	Great Britain	26.76	

=== S10 ===
18:45 9 September 2016:

Rank	Lane	Name	Nationality	Time	Notes
1st place, gold medalist(s)	4	Maksym Krypak	Ukraine	23.33	
2nd place, silver medalist(s)	3	Phelipe Rodrigues	Brazil	23.56	
3rd place, bronze medalist(s)	5	Denys Dubrov	Ukraine	23.75	
4	2	André Brasil	Brazil	23.78	
5	6	Nathan Stein	Canada	24.00	
6	7	Rowan Crothers	Australia	24.09	
7	8	Guy Harrison-Murray	Australia	24.47	
8	1	Alec Elliot	Canada	24.84	

=== S11 ===
18:08 12 September 2016:

Rank	Lane	Name	Nationality	Time	Notes
1st place, gold medalist(s)	4	Bradley Snyder	United States	25.57	
2nd place, silver medalist(s)	6	Keiichi Kimura	Japan	26.52	
3rd place, bronze medalist(s)	5	Bozun Yang	China	26.72	
4	7	Oleksandr Mashchenko	Ukraine	26.97	
5	2	Hryhory Zudzilau	Belarus	27.02	
6	3	Hendri Herbst	South Africa	27.11	
7	1	Miroslav Smrcka	Czech Republic	28.08	
	8	Viktor Smyrnov	Ukraine		DSQ

=== S12 ===
18:00 17 September 2016:

Rank	Lane	Name	Nationality	Time	Notes
1st place, gold medalist(s)	4	Maksym Veraksa	Ukraine	23.67	
2nd place, silver medalist(s)	5	Dzmitry Salei	Azerbaijan	24.29	
3rd place, bronze medalist(s)	6	Illia Yaremenko	Ukraine	24.41	
4	3	Raman Salei	Azerbaijan	24.45	
5	2	Tucker Dupree	United States	24.49	
6	7	Charalampos Taiganidis	Greece	24.99	
7	1	Sergii Klippert	Ukraine	25.00	
8	8	Thomaz Matera	Brazil	25.12	

=== S13 ===
19:46 14 September 2016:

Rank	Lane	Name	Nationality	Time	Notes
1st place, gold medalist(s)	4	Ihar Boki	Belarus	23.44	PR
2nd place, silver medalist(s)	5	Carlos Farrenberg	Brazil	24.17	
3rd place, bronze medalist(s)	3	Muzaffar Tursunkhujaev	Uzbekistan	24.21	
4	1	Iaroslav Denysenko	Ukraine	24.41	
5	6	Oleksii Fedyna	Ukraine	24.42	
6	2	Braedan Jason	Australia	24.61	
7	7	Kirill Pankov	Uzbekistan	24.63	
8	8	Nicolas Guy Turbide	Canada	25.52	
