= Swimming at the 2016 Summer Paralympics – Men's 150 metre individual medley SM3 =

Men's 150 metre individual medley SM3 at the XV Paralympic Games
- Venue: Olympic Aquatics Stadium
- Dates: 16 September 2016
- Competitors: 10 from 6 nations

Medalists
1st place, gold medalist(s)		Wenpan Huang	China
2nd place, silver medalist(s)		Dmytro Vynohradets	Ukraine
3rd place, bronze medalist(s)		Jianping Du	China

The Men's 150 metre individual medley SM3 event at the 2016 Paralympic Games took place on 16 September 2016, at the Olympic Aquatics Stadium. Two heats were held. The swimmers with the eight fastest times advanced to the final.

== Heats ==
=== Heat 1 ===
11:31 16 September 2016:

Rank	Lane	Name	Nationality	Time	Notes
1	5	Dmytro Vynohradets	Ukraine	2:46.04	Q
2	4	Jianping Du	China	2:59.45	Q
3	3	Arnulfo Castorena	Mexico	3:12.70	Q
4	6	Mikael Fredriksson	Sweden	3:24.81	Q
5	2	Charkorn Kaewsri	Thailand	3:54.96	

=== Heat 2 ===
11:38 16 September 2016:

Rank	Lane	Name	Nationality	Time	Notes
1	5	Tingshen Li	China	2:58.54	Q
2	4	Wenpan Huang	China	2:59.23	Q
3	3	Somchai Doungkaew	Thailand	3:02.73	Q
4	2	Cristopher Tronco	Mexico	3:37.08	Q
	6	Ioannis Kostakis	Greece		DSQ

== Final ==
20:19 16 September 2016:

Rank	Lane	Name	Nationality	Time	Notes
1st place, gold medalist(s)	3	Wenpan Huang	China	2:40.19	WR
2nd place, silver medalist(s)	4	Dmytro Vynohradets	Ukraine	2:40.75	
3rd place, bronze medalist(s)	6	Jianping Du	China	2:52.32	
4	5	Tingshen Li	China	2:55.29	
5	2	Somchai Doungkaew	Thailand	3:06.25	
6	7	Arnulfo Castorena	Mexico	3:10.84	
7	1	Mikael Fredriksson	Sweden	3:28.28	
8	8	Cristopher Tronco	Mexico	3:33.76	
