= Swimming at the 2012 Summer Paralympics – Men's 50 metre backstroke S3 =

Event at the 2012 Summer Paralympics

Men's 50m Backstroke S3 at the XIV Paralympic Games
- Venue: London Aquatics Centre
- Dates: 8 September 2012
- Competitors: 13 from 11 nations
- Winning time: 42.51

Medalists
1st place, gold medalist(s)		Min Byeong-eon	South Korea
2nd place, silver medalist(s)		Dmytro Vynohradets	Ukraine
3rd place, bronze medalist(s)		Du Jianping	China

The men's 50m backstroke S3 event at the 2012 Summer Paralympics took place at the London Aquatics Centre on 8 September. There were two heats; the swimmers with the eight fastest times advanced to the final.

== Results ==
=== Heats ===
Competed from 11:47.

==== Heat 1 ====
Rank	Lane	Name	Nationality	Time	Notes
1	4	Du Jianping	China	51.56	Q
2	3	Andrey Meshcheryakov	Russia	53.90	Q
3	5	Li Hanhua	China	55.72	Q
4	6	Grant Patterson	Australia	58.87	
5	7	Michael Demarco	United States	1:01.04	
6	2	Cristopher Tronco	Mexico	1:04.32	

==== Heat 2 ====
Rank	Lane	Name	Nationality	Time	Notes
1	4	Min Byeong-eon	South Korea	45.65	Q
2	5	Dmytro Vynohradets	Ukraine	48.02	Q, EU
3	3	Miguel Angel Martinez Tajuelo	Spain	51.69	Q
4	2	Mikael Fredriksson	Sweden	56.28	Q
5	6	Javier Hernandez Aguiran	Spain	58.29	Q
6	7	Frederic Bussi	France	1:01.31	
7	1	Ioannis Kostakis	Greece	1:13.21	

=== Final ===
Competed at 20:23.

Rank	Lane	Name	Nationality	Time	Notes
1st place, gold medalist(s)	4	Min Byeong-eon	South Korea	42.51	
2nd place, silver medalist(s)	5	Dmytro Vynohradets	Ukraine	46.26	EU
3rd place, bronze medalist(s)	3	Du Jianping	China	46.48	
4	6	Miguel Angel Martinez Tajuelo	Spain	51.83	
5	7	Li Hanhua	China	52.03	
6	1	Mikael Fredriksson	Sweden	55.81	
7	2	Andrey Meshcheryakov	Russia	56.11	
8	8	Javier Hernandez Aguiran	Spain	56.89	

Q = qualified for final. EU = European Record.
