= Swimming at the 2016 Summer Paralympics – Men's 200 metre freestyle S3 =

Men's 200 metre freestyle S3 at the XV Paralympic Games
- Venue: Olympic Aquatics Stadium
- Dates: 15 September 2016
- Competitors: 8 from 6 nations

Medalists
1st place, gold medalist(s)		Wenpan Huang	China
2nd place, silver medalist(s)		Dmytro Vynohradets	Ukraine
3rd place, bronze medalist(s)		Hanhua Li	China

The Men's 200 metre freestyle S3 event at the 2016 Paralympic Games took place on 15 September 2016, at the Olympic Aquatics Stadium. No heats were held. The swimmers with the eight fastest times advanced to the final.

== Final ==
18:32 15 September 2016:

Rank	Lane	Name	Nationality	Time	Notes
1st place, gold medalist(s)	4	Wenpan Huang	China	3:09.04	WR
2nd place, silver medalist(s)	5	Dmytro Vynohradets	Ukraine	3:09.77	
3rd place, bronze medalist(s)	3	Hanhua Li	China	3:23.10	
4	6	Vincenzo Boni	Italy	3:30.02	
5	7	Chaowen Huang	China	3:39.41	
6	2	Miguel Angel Martinez Tajuelo	Spain	3:45.19	
7	1	Ioannis Kostakis	Greece	4:01.46	
8	8	Mikael Fredriksson	Sweden	4:17.70	
