= Swimming at the 2008 Summer Paralympics – Men's 50 metre freestyle S3 =

Men's 50 metre freestyle S3 at the XIII Paralympic Games
- Venue: Beijing National Aquatics Center
- Dates: September 7
- Competitors: 11 from 10 nations

Medalists
1st place, gold medalist(s)		Dmytro Vynohradets	Ukraine
2nd place, silver medalist(s)		Du Jianping	China
3rd place, bronze medalist(s)		Byeong-Eon Min	South Korea

The men's 50 metre freestyle S3 event at the 2008 Paralympic Games took place on September 7, at the Beijing National Aquatics Center.

Two heats were held, with eleven swimmers in total. The swimmers with the eight fastest times advanced to the final; there, they all competed in a single final heat to earn final placements.

== Heats ==
=== Heat 1 ===
Rank	Name	Nationality	Time	Notes
1	Du Jianping	China	52.70	Q
2	Dmytro Vynohradets	Ukraine	53.71	Q
3	Miguel Angel Martinez	Spain	57.32	Q
4	Albert Bakaev	Russia	58.64	Q
5	Michael Demarco	United States	1:00.69	Q
6	Loi Si Ao	Macau	1:23.77	

=== Heat 2 ===
Rank	Name	Nationality	Time	Notes
1	Byeong Eon Min	South Korea	46.91	Q
2	Ioannis Kostakis	Greece	49.87	Q
3	Li Hanhua	China	50.13	Q
4	Cristopher Tronco	Mexico	1:05.00	
5	Jimmy Eulert	Peru		DQ

== Final ==
Rank	Name	Nationality	Time	Notes
1	Dmytro Vynohradets	Ukraine	42.60	WR
2	Du Jianping	China	44.19	
3	Min Byeong-eon	South Korea	45.75	
4	Li Hanhua	China	47.15	
5	Ioannis Kostakis	Greece	49.84	
6	Miguel Angel Martinez	Spain	57.11	
7	Michael Demarco	United States	1:01.69	
8	Albert Bakaev	Russia	1:03.95	
