= Swimming at the 2016 Summer Paralympics – Men's 50 metre breaststroke SB2 =

Men's 50 metre breaststroke SB2 at the XV Paralympic Games
- Venue: Olympic Aquatics Stadium
- Dates: 14 September 2016
- Competitors: 9 from 5 nations

Medalists
1st place, gold medalist(s)		Wenpan Huang	China
2nd place, silver medalist(s)		Tingshen Li	China
3rd place, bronze medalist(s)		Huang Chaowen	China

The Men's 50 metre breaststroke SB2 event at the 2016 Paralympic Games took place on 14 September 2016, at the Olympic Aquatics Stadium. Two heats were held. The swimmers with the eight fastest times advanced to the final.

== Heats ==
=== Heat 1 ===
10:17 14 September 2016:

Rank	Lane	Name	Nationality	Time	Notes
1	4	Tingshen Li	China	55.16	PR Q
2	6	Dmytro Vynohradets	Ukraine	56.35	Q
3	5	Somchai Doungkaew	Thailand	56.69	Q
4	3	Ioannis Kostakis	Greece	1:06.29	Q

=== Heat 2 ===
10:21 14 September 2016:

Rank	Lane	Name	Nationality	Time	Notes
1	4	Wenpan Huang	China	52.48	WR Q
2	5	Chaowen Huang	China	55.74	Q
3	3	Arnulfo Castorena	Mexico	58.99	Q
4	6	Cristopher Tronco	Mexico	59.07	Q
5	2	Charkorn Kaewsri	Thailand	1:12.34	

== Final ==
19:09 14 September 2016:

Rank	Lane	Name	Nationality	Time	Notes
1st place, gold medalist(s)	4	Wenpan Huang	China	50.65	WR
2nd place, silver medalist(s)	5	Tingshen Li	China	51.78	
3rd place, bronze medalist(s)	3	Chaowen Huang	China	54.29	
4	6	Dmytro Vynohradets	Ukraine	55.03	
5	2	Somchai Doungkaew	Thailand	56.52	
6	7	Arnulfo Castorena	Mexico	57.70	
7	8	Ioannis Kostakis	Greece	1:07.48	
	1	Cristopher Tronco	Mexico		DSQ
