= Swimming at the 2012 Summer Paralympics – Men's 50 metre breaststroke SB2 =

Men's 50 metre breaststroke SB2 at the XIV Paralympic Games
- Venue: London Aquatics Centre
- Dates: 30 August
- Competitors: 13 from 11 nations

Medalists
1st place, gold medalist(s)		Jianping Du	China
2nd place, silver medalist(s)		Arnulfo Castorena	Mexico
3rd place, bronze medalist(s)		Dmytro Vynohradets	Ukraine

The men's 50 metre breaststroke SB2 event at the 2012 Paralympic Games took place on 30 August, at the London Aquatics Centre.

Two heats were held, one with six swimmers and one with seven swimmers. The swimmers with the eight fastest times advanced to the final.

== Heats ==
=== Heat 1 ===
Rank	Lane	Name	Nationality	Time	Notes
1	4	Arnulfo Castorena	Mexico	59.01	Q
2	5	Dmytro Vynohradets	Ukraine	59.56 EU	Q
3	3	Cristopher Tronco	Mexico	1:00.12	Q
4	6	Grant Patterson	Australia	1:05.86	Q
5	7	Hanhua Li	China	1:07.82	
6	7	Charkorn Kaewsri	Thailand	1:08.49	

=== Heat 2 ===
Rank	Lane	Name	Nationality	Time	Notes
1	4	Jianping Du	China	57.83 AS	Q
2	6	Andrey Meshcheryakov	Russia	1:00.11	Q
3	3	Michael Demarco	United States	1:02.39	Q
4	5	Somchai Doungkaew	Thailand	1:02.72	Q
5	2	Ioannis Kostakis	Greece	1:05.94	
6	7	Byeong-Eon Min	South Korea	1:10.22	
7	1	Mark Chirino	Venezuela	1:18.66	

== Final ==
Rank	Lane	Name	Nationality	Time	Notes
1st place, gold medalist(s)	4	Du Jianping	China	57.50	AS
2nd place, silver medalist(s)	5	Arnulfo Castorena	Mexico	58.23	
3rd place, bronze medalist(s)	3	Dmytro Vynohradets	Ukraine	58.51	EU
4	2	Cristopher Tronco	Mexico	01:01.12	
5	7	Michael Demarco	United States	1:01.50	
6	1	Somchai Doungkaew	Thailand	1:01.84	
7	6	Andrey Meshcheryakov	Russia	1:02.31	
8	8	Grant Patterson	Australia	1:07.52	
