= Swimming at the 2008 Summer Paralympics – Men's 50 metre backstroke S3 =

Men's 50m Backstroke S3 at the XIII Paralympic Games
- Venue: Beijing National Aquatics Center
- Dates: 15 September
- Competitors: 11 from 10 nations
- Winning time: 44.31

Medalists
1st place, gold medalist(s)		Du Jianping	China
2nd place, silver medalist(s)		Min Byeong Eon	South Korea
3rd place, bronze medalist(s)		Dmytro Vynohradets	Ukraine

The men's 50m backstroke S3 event at the 2008 Summer Paralympics took place at the Beijing National Aquatics Center on 15 September. There were two heats; the swimmers with the eight fastest times advanced to the final.

== Results ==
=== Heats ===
Competed from 09:40.

==== Heat 1 ====
Rank	Name	Nationality	Time	Notes
1	Du Jianping	China	49.01	Q, WR
2	Li Hanhua	China	55.86	Q
3	Genezi Andrade	Brazil	59.04	Q
4	Michael Demarco	United States	1:03.21	Q
	Jimmy Eulert	Peru		DNS

==== Heat 2 ====
Rank	Name	Nationality	Time	Notes
1	Min Byeong Eon	South Korea	45.85	Q, WR
2	Dmytro Vynohradets	Ukraine	52.96	Q
3	Miguel Angel Martinez	Spain	55.90	Q
4	Albert Bakaev	Russia	1:00.24	Q
5	Cristopher Tronco	Mexico	1:06.04	
6	Ioannis Kostakis	Greece	1:08.89	

=== Final ===
Competed at 17:17.

Rank	Name	Nationality	Time	Notes
1st place, gold medalist(s)	Du Jianping	China	44.31	WR
2nd place, silver medalist(s)	Min Byeong Eon	South Korea	44.80	
3rd place, bronze medalist(s)	Dmytro Vynohradets	Ukraine	53.37	
4	Li Hanhua	China	54.42	
5	Miguel Angel Martinez	Spain	56.82	
6	Albert Bakaev	Russia	58.31	
7	Genezi Andrade	Brazil	59.25	
8	Michael Demarco	United States	1:03.03	

Q = qualified for final. WR = World Record. DNS = Did not start.
