= Swimming at the 2016 Summer Paralympics – Mixed 4 × 50 metre freestyle relay 20pts =

Mixed 4 × 50 freestyle relay - 20 points at the XV Paralympic Games
- Venue: Olympic Aquatics Stadium
- Dates: 9 September 2016
- Competitors: from 9 nations

Medalists
1st place, gold medalist(s)		China (CHN)
2nd place, silver medalist(s)		Brazil (BRA)
3rd place, bronze medalist(s)		Ukraine (UKR)

The mixed 4 × 50 freestyle relay - 20 points swimming events for the 2016 Summer Paralympics took place at the Rio Olympic Stadium on 9 September 2016.

== Competition format ==
Each event consists of two rounds: heats and final. The top eight teams overall in the heats progressed to the final. Relay teams consist of two men and two women, and are based on a point score. The sport class of an individual swimmer is worth the actual number value i.e. sport class S6 is worth six points, sport class SB12 is worth twelve points, and so on. The total of all the competitors must add up to 20 points or less.

== Records ==
Prior to the competition, the World record was as follows:

World record	Brazil	2:29.80	Glasgow, Great Britain	13 July 2015

== Heats ==
=== Heat 1 ===
11:34 9 September 2016

Rank	Lane	Name	Nationality	Time	Notes
1	4	Yelyzaveta Mereshko (S6); Dmytro Vynohradets (S3); Olga Sviderska (S3); Bohdan Hrynenko (S8)	Ukraine	2:32.19	Q
2	3	Alexandra Stamatopoulou (S3); Chrysoula Antoniadou (S5); Panagiotis Christakis(S6); Georgios Sfaltos (S6)	Greece	2:43.43	Q
3	6	Itzhak Mamistvalov (S1); Erel Halevi (S7); Inbal Pezaro (S5); Yoav Valinsky (S6)	Israel	3:10.00	Q
	5		Mexico		DNS

=== Heat 2 ===
11:41 9 September 2016

Rank	Lane	Name	Nationality	Time	Notes
1	4	Patricia Pereira dos Santos (S4); Talisson Glock (S6); Susana Ribeiro (S5); Clodoaldo Silva (S5)	Brazil	2:33.94	Q
2	5	Vincenzo Boni (S3); Arjola Trimi(S4); Valerio Talas (S7); Emanuela Romano (S6)	Italy	2:38.01	Q
3	3	Hanhua Li (S3); Li Zhang (S5); Liankang Zou (S2); Yi Chen (S10)	China	2:41.29	Q
3	6	Rachel Watson (S4); Kate Wilson(S6); Ahmed Kelly (S4); Matthew Haanappel (S6)	Australia	2:46.43	Q
	2		Colombia		DNS

== Final ==
20:43 9 September 2016

Rank	Lane	Name	Nationality	Time	Notes
1st place, gold medalist(s)	6	Qiuping Peng (S3); Shengnan Jiang (S8); Wenpan Huang (S3); Qing Xu (S6)	China	2:18.03	WR
2nd place, silver medalist(s)	5	Clodoaldo Silva (S5); Joana Neves (S5); Susana Ribeiro (S5); Daniel Dias (S5)	Brazil	2:25.45	
3rd place, bronze medalist(s)	4	Andrii Derevinskyi (S4); Viktoriia Savtsova (S6); Olga Sviderska (S3); Ievgenii Bogodaiko (S7)	Ukraine	2:30.66	
4	3	Vincenzo Boni (S3); Arjola Trimi (S4); Valerio Talas (S7); Emanuela Romano (S6)	Italy	2:33.16	
5	2	Alexandra Stamatopoulou (S3); Chrysoula Antoniadou (S5); Panagiotis Christakis(S6); Georgios Sfaltos (S6)	Greece	2:39.35	
6	7	Rachel Watson (S4); Kate Wilson (S6); Ahmed Kelly (S4); Matthew Haanappel (S6)	Australia	2:39.92	
	1	Iad Joseph Shalabi (S2); Erel Halevi (S7); Inbal Pezaro (S5); Yoav Valinsky (S6)	Israel		DSQ
