= Swimming at the 2008 Summer Paralympics – Men's 200 metre freestyle S3 =

Men's 200m Freestyle S3 at the XIII Paralympic Games
- Venue: Beijing National Aquatics Center
- Dates: 9 September
- Competitors: 6 from 5 nations
- Winning time: 3:22.98

Medalists
1st place, gold medalist(s)		Dmytro Vynohradets	Ukraine
2nd place, silver medalist(s)		Li Hanhua	China
3rd place, bronze medalist(s)		Du Jianping	China

The men's 200m freestyle S3 event at the 2008 Summer Paralympics took place at the Beijing National Aquatics Center on 9 September. There were no heats in this event.

== Final ==
Competed at 18:32.

Rank	Name	Nationality	Time	Notes
1st place, gold medalist(s)	Dmytro Vynohradets	Ukraine	3:22.98	WR
2nd place, silver medalist(s)	Li Hanhua	China	3:23.40	
3rd place, bronze medalist(s)	Du Jianping	China	3:27.82	
4	Ioannis Kostakis	Greece	3:38.42	
5	Genezi Andrade	Brazil	4:15.50	
6	Michael Demarco	United States	4:39.79	

WR = World Record.
