= Swimming at the 2016 Summer Paralympics – Men's 50 metre freestyle S8 =

Men's 50 metre freestyle S8 at the XV Paralympic Games
- Venue: Olympic Aquatics Stadium
- Dates: 16 September 2016
- Competitors: 15 from 12 nations

Medalists
1st place, gold medalist(s)		Yinan Wang	China
2nd place, silver medalist(s)		Bohdan Hrynenko	Ukraine
3rd place, bronze medalist(s)		Iurii Bozhynskyi	Ukraine

The Men's 50 metre freestyle S8 event at the 2016 Paralympic Games took place on 16 September 2016, at the Olympic Aquatics Stadium. Two heats were held. The swimmers with the eight fastest times advanced to the final.

== Heats ==
=== Heat 1 ===
10:04 16 September 2016:

Rank	Lane	Name	Nationality	Time	Notes
1	4	Bohdan Hrynenko	Ukraine	27.35	Q
2	5	Josef Craig	Great Britain	27.36	Q
3	6	Guanglong Yang	China	27.65	Q
4	3	Blake Cochrane	Australia	28.19	
5	2	Gabriel Sousa	Brazil	28.24	
6	7	Niels Mortensen	Denmark	28.40	
7	1	Andreas Onea	Austria	29.49	

=== Heat 2 ===
10:06 16 September 2016:

Rank	Lane	Name	Nationality	Time	Notes
1	4	Yinan Wang	China	26.80	Q
2	5	Iurii Bozhynskyi	Ukraine	26.95	Q
3	7	Maodang Song	China	27.29	Q
4	3	Charles Rozoy	France	27.44	Q
5	6	Zack McAllister	Canada	27.90	Q
6	2	Luis Armando Andrade Guillen	Mexico	28.06	
7	1	Inigo Llopis Sanz	Spain	28.74	
8	8	David Carreira	Portugal	29.32	

== Final ==
17:57 16 September 2016:

Rank	Lane	Name	Nationality	Time	Notes
1st place, gold medalist(s)	4	Yinan Wang	China	26.24	
2nd place, silver medalist(s)	6	Bohdan Hrynenko	Ukraine	26.67	
3rd place, bronze medalist(s)	5	Iurii Bozhynskyi	Ukraine	26.75	
4	7	Charles Rozoy	France	27.17	
5	3	Maodang Song	China	27.25	
6	2	Josef Craig	Great Britain	27.27	
7	1	Guanglong Yang	China	27.43	
8	8	Zack McAllister	Canada	27.73	
