= Swimming at the 2016 Summer Paralympics – Women's 100 metre breaststroke SB11 =

Women's 100 metre breaststroke SB11 at the XV Paralympic Games
- Venue: Olympic Aquatics Stadium
- Dates: 13 September 2016
- Competitors: 7 from 7 nations

Medalists
1st place, gold medalist(s)		Xiaotong Zhang	China
2nd place, silver medalist(s)		Liesette Bruinsma	Netherlands
3rd place, bronze medalist(s)		Maja Reichard	Sweden

The women's 100 metre breaststroke SB11 event at the 2016 Paralympic Games took place on 13 September 2016, at the Olympic Aquatics Stadium. No heats were held.

== Final ==
18:52 13 September 2016:

Rank	Lane	Name	Nationality	Time	Notes
1st place, gold medalist(s)	3	Xiaotong Zhang	China	1:23.02	WR
2nd place, silver medalist(s)	4	Liesette Bruinsma	Netherlands	1:25.81	
3rd place, bronze medalist(s)	5	Maja Reichard	Sweden	1:26.60	
4	6	Yana Berezhna	Ukraine	1:28.04	
5	2	Nadia Baez	Argentina	1:35.51	
6	7	Letticia Martinez	United States	1:38.22	
7	1	Martina Rabbolini	Italy	1:38.81	
