= Swimming at the 2016 Summer Paralympics – Men's 50 metre freestyle S12 =

Men's 50 metre freestyle S12 at the XV Paralympic Games
- Venue: Olympic Aquatics Stadium
- Dates: 17 September 2016
- Competitors: 19 from 15 nations

Medalists
1st place, gold medalist(s)		Maksym Veraksa	Ukraine
2nd place, silver medalist(s)		Dzmitry Salei	Azerbaijan
3rd place, bronze medalist(s)		Illia Yaremenko	Ukraine

The Men's 50 metre freestyle S12 event at the 2016 Paralympic Games took place on 17 September 2016, at the Olympic Aquatics Stadium. Three heats were held. The swimmers with the eight fastest times advanced to the final.

== Heats ==
=== Heat 1 ===
10:14 17 September 2016:

Rank	Lane	Name	Nationality	Time	Notes
1	4	Dzmitry Salei	Azerbaijan	24.40	Q
2	5	Sergii Klippert	Ukraine	25.02	Q
3	2	Uladzimir Izotau	Belarus	25.69	
4	3	Stephen Clegg	Great Britain	25.78	
5	6	Daniel Giraldo Correa	Colombia	25.99	
6	7	Samuel Ciorap	Romania	26.36	

=== Heat 2 ===
10:17 17 September 2016:

Rank	Lane	Name	Nationality	Time	Notes
1	5	Illia Yaremenko	Ukraine	24.51	Q
2	4	Tucker Dupree	United States	24.62	Q
3	3	Daniel Simon	Germany	25.23	
4	2	Anuar Akhmetov	Kazakhstan	25.89	
5	6	Fabrizio Sottile	Italy	25.95	
6	7	Diego Fernando Cuesta Martinez	Colombia	26.28	

=== Heat 3 ===
10:19 17 September 2016:

Rank	Lane	Name	Nationality	Time	Notes
1	4	Maksym Veraksa	Ukraine	23.74	Q
2	5	Raman Salei	Azerbaijan	24.43	Q
3	3	Charalampos Taiganidis	Greece	24.97	Q
4	6	Thomaz Matera	Brazil	25.07	Q
5	2	Dmitriy Horlin	Uzbekistan	25.59	
6	7	Dong Ho Han	South Korea	26.10	
7	1	Darvin Baez Eliza	Puerto Rico	28.61	

== Final ==
18:00 17 September 2016:

Rank	Lane	Name	Nationality	Time	Notes
1st place, gold medalist(s)	4	Maksym Veraksa	Ukraine	23.67	
2nd place, silver medalist(s)	5	Dzmitry Salei	Azerbaijan	24.29	
3rd place, bronze medalist(s)	6	Illia Yaremenko	Ukraine	24.41	
4	3	Raman Salei	Azerbaijan	24.45	
5	2	Tucker Dupree	United States	24.49	
6	7	Charalampos Taiganidis	Greece	24.99	
7	1	Sergii Klippert	Ukraine	25.00	
8	8	Thomaz Matera	Brazil	25.12	
