= Swimming at the 2016 Summer Paralympics – Women's 200 metre individual medley SM11 =

Women's 200 metre individual medley SM11 at the XV Paralympic Games
- Venue: Olympic Aquatics Stadium
- Dates: 16 September 2016
- Competitors: 12 from 9 nations

Medalists
1st place, gold medalist(s)		Liesette Bruinsma	Netherlands
2nd place, silver medalist(s)		Maja Reichard	Sweden
3rd place, bronze medalist(s)		Qing Xie	China

The women's 200 metre individual medley SM11 event at the 2016 Paralympic Games took place on 16 September 2016, at the Olympic Aquatics Stadium. Two heats were held. The swimmers with the eight fastest times advanced to the final.

== Heats ==
=== Heat 1 ===
10:43 16 September 2016:

Rank	Lane	Name	Nationality	Time	Notes
1	4	Qing Xie	China	2:55.75	Q
2	3	Elisabeth Egel	Estonia	2:56.64	Q
3	5	Mary Fisher	New Zealand	3:00.69	Q
4	6	Kateryna Tkachuk	Ukraine	3:11.37	
5	2	Martina Rabbolini	Italy	3:15.67	
	7	Liwen Cai	China		DSQ

=== Heat 2 ===
10:50 16 September 2016:

Rank	Lane	Name	Nationality	Time	Notes
1	4	Liesette Bruinsma	Netherlands	2:54.70	Q
2	3	Maja Reichard	Sweden	2:55.80	Q
3	5	Daniela Schulte	Germany	3:00.74	Q
4	6	Maryna Piddubna	Ukraine	3:00.75	Q
5	7	Yana Berezhna	Ukraine	3:08.50	Q
6	2	Letticia Martinez	United States	3:11.96	

== Final ==
19:00 16 September 2016:

Rank	Lane	Name	Nationality	Time	Notes
1st place, gold medalist(s)	4	Liesette Bruinsma	Netherlands	2:49.87	
2nd place, silver medalist(s)	3	Maja Reichard	Sweden	2:51.72	
3rd place, bronze medalist(s)	5	Qing Xie	China	2:51.98	
4	1	Maryna Piddubna	Ukraine	2:55.31	
5	6	Elisabeth Egel	Estonia	2:55.62	
6	2	Mary Fisher	New Zealand	2:55.71	
7	7	Daniela Schulte	Germany	2:59.08	
8	8	Yana Berezhna	Ukraine	3:07.58	
