= Swimming at the 2016 Summer Paralympics – Women's 100 metre backstroke S11 =

Women's 100 metre backstroke S11 at the XV Paralympic Games
- Venue: Olympic Aquatics Stadium
- Dates: 9 September 2016
- Competitors: 16 from 11 nations

Medalists
1st place, gold medalist(s)		Mary Fisher	New Zealand
2nd place, silver medalist(s)		Liwen Cai	China
3rd place, bronze medalist(s)		Maja Reichard	Sweden

The women's 100 metre backstroke S11 event at the 2016 Paralympic Games took place on 9 September 2016, at the Olympic Aquatics Stadium. Two heats were held. The swimmers with the eight fastest times advanced to the final.

== Heats ==
=== Heat 1 ===
10:32 9 September 2016:

Rank	Lane	Name	Nationality	Time	Notes
1	6	Liwen Cai	China	1:20.59	Q
2	4	Maryna Piddubna	Ukraine	1:21.81	Q
3	5	Cecilia Camellini	Italy	1:22.01	Q
4	2	Guizhi Li	China	1:23.34	Q
5	3	Maja Reichard	Sweden	1:25.19	Q
6	1	Regiane Nunes Silva	Brazil	1:28.35	
7	7	Liesette Bruinsma	Netherlands	1:30.58	
8	8	Naomi Ikinaga	Japan	1:35.66	

=== Heat 2 ===
10:37 9 September 2016:

Rank	Lane	Name	Nationality	Time	Notes
1	4	Mary Fisher	New Zealand	1:18.68	PR Q
2	3	Kateryna Tkachuk	Ukraine	1:21.90	Q
3	2	Chikako Ono	Japan	1:25.36	Q
4	5	Daniela Schulte	Germany	1:26.12	
5	6	Elisabeth Egel	Estonia	1:28.28	
6	7	Martina Rabbolini	Italy	1:30.28	
7	8	Letticia Martinez	United States	1:31.16	
8	1	Yana Berezhna	Ukraine	1:32.53	

== Final ==
19:19 9 September 2016:

Rank	Lane	Name	Nationality	Time	Notes
1st place, gold medalist(s)	4	Mary Fisher	New Zealand	1:17.96	WR
2nd place, silver medalist(s)	5	Liwen Cai	China	1:20.29	
3rd place, bronze medalist(s)	1	Maja Reichard	Sweden	1:21.46	
4	3	Maryna Piddubna	Ukraine	1:21.86	
5	6	Kateryna Tkachuk	Ukraine	1:22.69	
6	7	Guizhi Li	China	1:22.97	
7	2	Cecilia Camellini	Italy	1:23.12	
8	8	Chikako Ono	Japan	1:25.40	
