= Swimming at the 2016 Summer Paralympics – Men's 100 metre breaststroke SB5 =

Men's 100 metre breaststroke SB5 at the XV Paralympic Games
- Venue: Olympic Aquatics Stadium
- Dates: 11 September 2016
- Competitors: 9 from 7 nations

Medalists
1st place, gold medalist(s)		Karl Forsman	Sweden
2nd place, silver medalist(s)		Woo Geun Lim	South Korea
3rd place, bronze medalist(s)		Pedro Rangel	Mexico

The Men's 100 metre breaststroke SB5 event at the 2016 Paralympic Games took place on 11 September 2016, at the Olympic Aquatics Stadium. Two heats were held. The swimmers with the eight fastest times advanced to the final.

== Heats ==
=== Heat 1 ===
9:30 11 September 2016:

Rank	Lane	Name	Nationality	Time	Notes
1	4	Karl Forsman	Sweden	1:33.47	Q
2	5	Pedro Rangel	Mexico	1:37.02	Q
3	3	Georgios Sfaltos	Greece	1:40.17	Q
4	6	Adriano de Lima	Brazil	1:45.04	Q

=== Heat 2 ===
9:34 11 September 2016:

Rank	Lane	Name	Nationality	Time	Notes
1	4	Woo Geun Lim	South Korea	1:34.86	Q
2	5	Roberto Rodriguez	Brazil	1:39.82	Q
3	3	Marco Maria Dolfin	Italy	1:40.00	Q
4	2	Thanh Hai Do	Vietnam	1:40.96	Q
5	6	Humberto Origenes Romero Porras	Mexico	1:49.26	

== Final ==
17:30 11 September 2016:

Rank	Lane	Name	Nationality	Time	Notes
1st place, gold medalist(s)	4	Karl Forsman	Sweden	1:34.27	
2nd place, silver medalist(s)	5	Woo Geun Lim	South Korea	1:35.18	
3rd place, bronze medalist(s)	3	Pedro Rangel	Mexico	1:37.84	
4	2	Marco Maria Dolfin	Italy	1:38.27	
5	6	Roberto Rodriguez	Brazil	1:39.06	
6	7	Georgios Sfaltos	Greece	1:40.05	
7	1	Thanh Hai Do	Vietnam	1:40.31	
8	8	Adriano de Lima	Brazil	1:46.18	
