= Sweden at the 2016 Summer Paralympics =

- IPC code: SWE
- NPC: Swedish Parasports Federation

in Rio de Janeiro
- Competitors: 57 in 15 sports
- Flag bearer: Maja Reichard
- Medals Ranked 49th: Gold 1 Silver 4 Bronze 5 Total 10

Summer Paralympics appearances (overview)
- 1960; 1964; 1968; 1972; 1976; 1980; 1984; 1988; 1992; 1996; 2000; 2004; 2008; 2012; 2016; 2020; 2024

Sweden competed at the 2016 Summer Paralympics in Rio de Janeiro, Brazil, from 7 September to 18 September 2016. They won ten medals; one gold, four silver and five bronze.

== Medalists ==
Medal	Name	Sport	Event	Date
Gold	Karl Forsman	Swimming	Men's 100 m breaststroke SB5	11 September
Silver	Joackim Norberg	Shooting	Mixed 25 metre pistol SH1	11 September
Silver	Maja Reichard	Swimming	Women's 50 m freestyle S11	12 September
Silver	Emil Andersson; Linus Karlsson	Table tennis	Men's team class 6–8	16 September
Silver	Maja Reichard	Swimming	Women's 200 m individual medley SM11	16 September
Bronze	Maja Reichard	Swimming	Women's 100 m backstroke S11	9 September
Bronze	Anna-Carin Ahlquist	Table tennis	Women's singles class 3	12 September
Bronze	Louise Etzner Jakobsson	Equestrian	Individual Championship test grade III	13 September
Bronze	Maja Reichard	Swimming	Women's 100 m breaststroke SB11	13 September
Bronze	Louise Etzner Jakobsson	Equestrian	Individual Freestyle test grade III	16 September

Medals by sport
Sport	Gold medal	Silver medal	Bronze medal	Total
Swimming	1	2	2	5
Table tennis	0	1	1	2
Shooting	0	1	0	1
Equestrian	0	0	2	2
Total	1	4	5	10

== Administration ==
On 7 September 2015, one year before the opening ceremony, the Swedish Parasports Federation nominated the first athletes for the Swedish team.

== Disability classifications ==
Every participant at the Paralympics has their disability grouped into one of five disability categories; amputation, the condition may be congenital or sustained through injury or illness; cerebral palsy; wheelchair athletes, there is often overlap between this and other categories; visual impairment, including blindness; Les autres, any physical disability that does not fall strictly under one of the other categories, for example dwarfism or multiple sclerosis. Each Paralympic sport then has its own classifications, dependent upon the specific physical demands of competition. Events are given a code, made of numbers and letters, describing the type of event and classification of the athletes competing. Some sports, such as athletics, divide athletes by both the category and severity of their disabilities, other sports, for example swimming, group competitors from different categories together, the only separation being based on the severity of the disability.

== Archery ==
Athlete	Event	Ranking round		Round of 32	Round of 16	Quarterfinals	Semifinals	Finals	
Athlete	Event	Score	Seed	Opposition score	Opposition score	Opposition score	Opposition score	Opposition score	Rank
Zandra Reppe	Women's individual compound open	652	5	Bye	Kim (KOR); L 135–142	Did not advance			9

== Athletics ==
Athlete	Event	Heat		Final	
Athlete	Event	Result	Rank	Result	Rank
Jeffrey Ige	Men's shot put F20	—N/a		15.30	5
Per Jonsson	Men's long jump F12	—N/a		6.71	9
Tobias Jonsson	Men's 100 m T12	11.57	8	Did not advance	
Tobias Jonsson	Men's long jump F12	—N/a		6.97	6
Viktoria Karlsson	Women's long jump T11	—N/a		4.49	7
Gunilla Wallengren	Women's 800 m T54	1:54.51	6	Did not advance	
Gunilla Wallengren	Women's 1500 m T54	3:30.99	7 q	3:30.14	10
Gunilla Wallengren	Women's 5000 m T54	12:07.88	6 q	12:20.15	10

== Boccia ==
Athlete	Event	Group			Quarterfinals	Semifinals	Final	Rank
Athlete	Event	Opposition Result	Opposition Result	Rank	Opposition Result	Opposition Result	Opposition Result	Rank
Maria Bjurström	Individual BC3	Toh (SIN); W 6–1	Leme (BRA); W 5–0	1	Macedo (POR); L 0–7	Did not advance		8

== Canoe sprint ==
Helene Ripa, paralympic gold and silver medallist in cross-country skiing in the 2014 Winter Paralympics qualified for her firsT Summer Paralympic Games in canoe sprint.

Athlete	Event	Heats		Semifinals		Final	
Athlete	Event	Time	Rank	Time	Rank	Time	Rank
Helene Ripa	Women's KL3	56.825	3 SF	54.735	2 FA	52.492	5

== Cycling ==
With one pathway for qualification being one highest ranked NPCs on the UCI Para-Cycling male and female Nations Ranking Lists on 31 December 2014, Sweden qualified for the 2016 Summer Paralympics in Rio, assuming they continued to meet all other eligibility requirements. In total, Sweden secured four quota places in road cycling.

=== Road ===
Athlete	Event	Time	Rank
Anders Bäckman	Men's road race H2	1:23:14	4
Anders Bäckman	Men's time trial H2	36:04.26	4
Henrik Marvig	Men's road race C3	1:51:48	7
Henrik Marvig	Men's time trial C3	43:13.13	10
Jessica Enfot	Women's road race H5	1:37:22	6
Jessica Enfot	Women's time trial H5	36:48.63	9

== Equestrian ==
The country earned an additional individual slot via the Para Equestrian Individual Ranking List Allocation method following the suspension of Russia, and France Finland not using one of their allocated spots.

Athlete	Horse	Event	Final	
Athlete	Horse	Event	Result	Rank
Louise Etzner Jakobsson	Zernard	Individual Championship test grade III	70.341	3rd place, bronze medalist(s)
Louise Etzner Jakobsson	Zernard	Individual Freestyle test grade III	73.650	3rd place, bronze medalist(s)
Anita Johnsson	Dear Friend	Individual Championship test grade Ia	70.870	8
Anita Johnsson	Dear Friend	Individual Freestyle test grade Ia	62.050	8

== Goalball ==
Summary

Key:

- ET: After Extra Time
- P – Match decided by penalty-shootout.

Team	Event	Group Stage					Quarterfinal	Semifinal	Final / BM	
Team	Event	Opposition Score	Opposition Score	Opposition Score	Opposition Score	Rank	Opposition Score	Opposition Score	Opposition Score	Rank
Sweden men's	Men's tournament	Brazil; L 6–9	Algeria; W 12–6	Germany; W 9–5	Canada; W 6–3	2	Turkey; W 5–1	Lithuania; L 2–7	Brazil; L 5–6^{ET}	4

=== Men's tournament ===
The men's national team qualified after finishing in third place at the 2015 IBSA World Games in Seoul. Sweden's men enter the tournament ranked 13th in the world.

Squad

The following is the Sweden roster in the men's goalball tournament of the 2016 Summer Paralympics.

No.	Player	Class	Date of birth (age)
1	Fatmir Seremeti	B2	10 April 1983 (aged 33)
3	Stefan Gahne	B2	15 January 1982 (aged 34)
4	Nils Posse	B2	28 October 1997 (aged 18)
5	Jimmy Björkstrand	B3	4 May 1979 (aged 37)
7	Mikael Åkerberg	B3	1 July 1982 (aged 34)
8	Peter Weichel	B3	23 December 1982 (aged 33)

Preliminary round

Pos	Team	Pld	W	D	L	GF	GA	GD	Pts	Qualification
1	Brazil (H)	4	4	0	0	42	15	+27	12	Quarter-finals
2	Sweden	4	3	0	1	33	23	+10	9	Quarter-finals
3	Germany	4	1	0	3	24	26	−2	3	Quarter-finals
4	Canada	4	1	0	3	26	39	−13	3	Quarter-finals
5	Algeria	4	1	0	3	25	47	−22	3	

Source: Paralympic.org
(H) Hosts

8 September 2016; 09:00	Brazil	9–6	Sweden	Future Arena, Rio de Janeiro; Referees: Bülent Kimyon (TUR), Patricia Fras (SLO)
8 September 2016; 09:00	Moreno 5 Sousa 2 Marques 1 Celente 1	Report	Björkstrand 5 Seremeti 1	Future Arena, Rio de Janeiro; Referees: Bülent Kimyon (TUR), Patricia Fras (SLO)

9 September 2016; 17:30	Sweden	12–6	Algeria	Future Arena, Rio de Janeiro; Referees: Daniel Voltan (BRA), Yoshinori Nii (JPN)
9 September 2016; 17:30	Weichel 5 Björkstrand 4 Seremeti 3	Report	Belhouchat 5 Mokrane 1	Future Arena, Rio de Janeiro; Referees: Daniel Voltan (BRA), Yoshinori Nii (JPN)

12 September 2016; 09:00	Sweden	9–5	Germany	Future Arena, Rio de Janeiro; Referees: Bülent Kimyon (TUR), Dawna Christy (CAN)
12 September 2016; 09:00	Björkstrand 4 Seremeti 3 Gahne 2	Report	Feistle 3 Horauf 2	Future Arena, Rio de Janeiro; Referees: Bülent Kimyon (TUR), Dawna Christy (CAN)

13 September 2016; 14:15	Canada	3–6	Sweden	Future Arena, Rio de Janeiro; Referees: Alexander Knecht (GER), Vilma Basinkaite (LTU)
13 September 2016; 14:15	Nesbitt 2 Zeividavi 1	Report	Björkstrand 3 Seremeti 3	Future Arena, Rio de Janeiro; Referees: Alexander Knecht (GER), Vilma Basinkaite (LTU)

Quarterfinal

14 September 2016; 21:00	Sweden	5–1	Turkey	Future Arena, Rio de Janeiro; Referees: Nejc Jakic (SLO), Yoshinori Nii (JPN)
14 September 2016; 21:00	Seremeti 2 Weichel 2 Björkstrand 1	Report	Akyüz	Future Arena, Rio de Janeiro; Referees: Nejc Jakic (SLO), Yoshinori Nii (JPN)

Semifinal

15 September 2016; 18:30	Lithuania	7–2	Sweden	Future Arena, Rio de Janeiro; Referees: Yoshinori Nii (JPN), Raquel Aguado (ESP)
15 September 2016; 18:30	Pavliukianec 5 Pazarauskas 2	Report	Seremeti 1 Weichel 1	Future Arena, Rio de Janeiro; Referees: Yoshinori Nii (JPN), Raquel Aguado (ESP)

Bronze medal match

16 September 2016; 15:00	Brazil	6–5 (a.e.t.)	Sweden	Future Arena, Rio de Janeiro; Referees: Bülent Kimyon (TUR), Yoshinori Nii (JPN)
16 September 2016; 15:00	Moreno 4 Sousa 2	Report	Björkstrand 3 Seremeti 2	Future Arena, Rio de Janeiro; Referees: Bülent Kimyon (TUR), Yoshinori Nii (JPN)

== Judo ==
Sweden have qualified one judoka for the Games.

Athlete	Event	Quarterfinals	Semifinals	Repechage	Bronze medal	Final	
Athlete	Event	Opposition Result	Opposition Result	Opposition Result	Opposition Result	Opposition Result	Rank
Nicolina Pernheim	Women's 63 kg	Jin (KOR); L 000–110	Did not advance	Bye	Tursunpashsha (UZB); L 000–100	Did not advance	5

== Paratriathlon ==
Athlete	Event	Swim (0.75 km)	Trans 1	Bike (20 km)	Trans 2	Run (5 km)	Total Time	Rank
Shahrzad Kiavash	Women's PT2	15.25	3.20	44.41	2.21	27.58	1:33:45	7

== Sailing ==
One pathway for qualifying for Rio involved having a boat have top seven finish at the 2015 Combined World Championships in a medal event where the country had nor already qualified through via the 2014 IFDS Sailing World Championships. Sweden qualified for the 2016 Games under this criterion in the 2.4m event with a fifteenth-place finish overall and the fifth country who had not qualified via the 2014 Championships. The boat was crewed by Fia Fjelddahl.

Athlete	Event	Race											Net points	Final rank
Athlete	Event	1	2	3	4	5	6	7	8	9	10	M*	Net points	Final rank
Fia Fjelddahl	2.4mR	13	15	12	13	~~17~~	12	8	13	12	11	2	111	12

== Shooting ==
The first opportunity to qualify for shooting at the Rio Games took place at the 2014 IPC Shooting World Championships in Suhl. Shooters earned spots for their NPC. Sweden earned a qualifying spot at this event in the R1 – 10m Air Rifle standing men SH1 event as a result of Jonas Jakobsson winning a gold medal. Jakobsson set a new European record of during qualifyingin the R1 event. Sweden qualified another shooter in the R7 – 50m rifle 3 positions Men SH1 event after Jakobsson won a gold medal in this event. Joackim Norberg earned the country another spot in the P1 – 10m Air Pistol Men SH1 event.

The third opportunity for direct qualification for shooters to the Rio Paralympics took place at the 2015 IPC Shooting World Cup in Sydney, Australia. At this competition, Ellinor Axelsson Vaughn earned a qualifying spot for their country in the R5- Mixed 10m Air Rifle Prone SH2 event. Håkan Gustafsson earned a second spot for Sweden at this competition in the R7- Men's 50m Rifle 3 Positions event. Lotta Helsinger claimed a third spot for Rio at this competition in the R8- Women's 50m Rifle 3 Positions event.

The last direct qualifying event for Rio in shooting took place at the 2015 IPC Shooting World Cup in Fort Benning in November. Philip Jönsson earned a qualifying spot for their country at this competition in the R4 Mixed 10m Air Rifle Standing SH2 event.

Athlete	Event	Qualification		Semifinal		Final	
Athlete	Event	Points	Rank	Points	Rank	Points	Rank
Ellinor Axelsson Vaughn	Mixed 10 m air rifle prone SH2	627.5	26	—N/a		Did not advance	
Ellinor Axelsson Vaughn	Mixed 10 m air rifle standing SH2	625.7	16	—N/a		Did not advance	
Håkan Gustafsson	Men's 10 m air rifle standing SH1	614.2	10	—N/a		Did not advance	
Håkan Gustafsson	Men's 50 m air rifle 3 positions SH1	1123-25x	17	—N/a		Did not advance	
Lotta Helsinger	Mixed 50 m air rifle prone SH1	Did not start		—N/a		Did not advance	
Lotta Helsinger	Women's 10 m air rifle standing SH1	385.6	19	—N/a		Did not advance	
Lotta Helsinger	Women's 50 m rifle 3 positions SH1	550-12x	12	—N/a		Did not advance	
Martin Häll	Men's 10 m air rifle standing SH1	610.9	15	—N/a		Did not advance	
Martin Häll	Men's 50 m air rifle 3 positions SH1	1115-27x	19	—N/a		Did not advance	
Martin Häll	Mixed 10 m air rifle prone SH1	622.6	36	—N/a		Did not advance	
Martin Häll	Mixed 50 m air rifle prone SH1	589.1	41	—N/a		Did not advance	
Jonas Jacobsson	Men's 10 m air rifle standing SH1	615.5	9	—N/a		Did not advance	
Jonas Jacobsson	Men's 50 m air rifle 3 positions SH1	1138-39x	10	—N/a		Did not advance	
Jonas Jacobsson	Mixed 10 m air rifle prone SH1	623.7	34	—N/a		Did not advance	
Jonas Jacobsson	Mixed 50 m air rifle prone SH1	614.4	11	—N/a		Did not advance	
Philip Jönsson	Mixed 10 m air rifle prone SH2	634.1	8 Q	—N/a		83.0	8
Philip Jönsson	Mixed 10 m air rifle standing SH2	632.4	5 Q	—N/a		82.5	8
Joackim Norberg	Men's 10 m air pistol SH1	557-13x	13	—N/a		Did not advance	
Joackim Norberg	Mixed 25 m pistol SH1	573-18x	4 Q	12	1 QG	5	2nd place, silver medalist(s)
Joackim Norberg	Mixed 50 m pistol SH1	520-4x	16	—N/a		Did not advance	
Håkan Sköld	Men's 10 m air pistol SH1	551-12x	23	—N/a		Did not advance	
Håkan Sköld	Mixed 25 m pistol SH1	531-7x	27	Did not advance			
Håkan Sköld	Mixed 50 m pistol SH1	517-4x	20	—N/a		Did not advance	

== Swimming ==
Men

Athlete	Event	Heat		Final	
Athlete	Event	Result	Rank	Result	Rank
Karl Forsman	400 m freestyle S6	6:04.09	10	Did not advance	
Karl Forsman	100 m breaststroke SB5	1:33.47	1 Q	1:34.27	1st place, gold medalist(s)
Mikael Fredriksson	50 m freestyle S3	52.26 NR	7 Q	55.74	8
Mikael Fredriksson	200 m freestyle S3	—N/a		4:17.70 NR	8
Mikael Fredriksson	50 m backstroke S3	56.91	8 Q	56.53	7
Mikael Fredriksson	150 m individual medley SM3	3:24.81	7 Q	3:28.28	7
Ludvig Nyrén	100 m freestyle S10	58.55	19	Did not advance	
Ludvig Nyrén	400 m freestyle S10	4:24.90	13	Did not advance	
Ludvig Nyrén	100 m butterfly S10	1:02.43	11	Did not advance	

Women

Athlete	Event	Heat		Final	
Athlete	Event	Result	Rank	Result	Rank
Pernilla Lindberg	200 m freestyle S14	2:13.74	3 Q	2:12.54	4
Pernilla Lindberg	100 m breaststroke SB14	1:23.88	7 Q	1:23.42	7
Pernilla Lindberg	100 m backstroke S14	1:15.54	5 Q	1:15.40	5
Pernilla Lindberg	200 m individual medley SM14	2:35.26	4 Q	2:36.30	4
Maja Reichard	50 m freestyle S11	31.05	2 Q	30.76 ER	2nd place, silver medalist(s)
Maja Reichard	100 m freestyle S11	1:11.98	6 Q	1:10.53	6
Maja Reichard	100 m backstroke S11	1:25.19	7 Q	1:21.46 NR	3rd place, bronze medalist(s)
Maja Reichard	100 m butterfly S13	1:20.70	17	Did not advance	
Maja Reichard	100 m breaststroke SB11	—N/a		1:26.60	3rd place, bronze medalist(s)
Maja Reichard	200 m individual medley SM11	2:55.80	3 Q	2:51.72 NR	2nd place, silver medalist(s)
Lina Watz	50 m freestyle S10	28.93	5 Q	29.69	8
Lina Watz	100 m freestyle S10	1:05.74	14	Did not advance	
Lina Watz	400 m freestyle S10	4:57.62	9	Did not advance	
Lina Watz	100 m backstroke S10	1:13.27	10	Did not advance	
Lina Watz	100 m butterfly S10	1:14.50	11	Did not advance	

Legend: Q=Qualified; ER=European record; NR=National record

== Table tennis ==
Men

Athlete	Event	Group			Round of 16	Quarterfinals	Semifinals	Final	Rank
Athlete	Event	Opposition Result	Opposition Result	Rank	Opposition Result	Opposition Result	Opposition Result	Opposition Result	Rank
Emil Andersson	Singles class 8	Skrznecki (POL); L 2–3	Wilson (GBR); W 3–2	2 Q	Zborai (HUN); W 3–1	Zhao (CHN); L 0–3	Did not advance		
Linus Karlsson	Singles class 8	Csonka (HUN); W 3–2	Manara (BRA); W 3–2	1 Q	Bouvais (FRA); W 3–1	Grudzień (POL); L 2–3	Did not advance		
Victor Sjöqvist	Singles class 3	Knaf (BRA); L 0–3	Zhai Xa (CHN); L 0–3	3	Did not advance				
Alexander Öhgren	Singles class 3	Koleosho (NGR); W 3–1	Petruniv (UKR); W 3–2	1 Q	Gürtler (GER); L 0–3	Did not advance			
Victor Sjöqvist; Alexander Öhgren	Team class 3	—N/a				Germany (GER); L 0–2	Did not advance		5
Emil Andersson; Linus Karlsson	Team class 6–8	—N/a			Bye	Slovakia (SVK); W 2–0	China (CHN); W 2–1	Ukraine (UKR); L 0–2	2nd place, silver medalist(s)

Women

Athlete	Event	Group			Round of 16	Quarterfinals	Semifinals	Final	Rank
Athlete	Event	Opposition Result	Opposition Result	Rank	Opposition Result	Opposition Result	Opposition Result	Opposition Result	Rank
Anna-Carin Ahlquist	Singles class 3	Sigala Lopez (MEX); W 3–0	Head (GBR); W 3–0	1 Q	Bye	Muzinic (CRO); W 3–2	Xue (CHN); L 1–3	Yoon (KOR); W 3–0	3rd place, bronze medalist(s)
Ingela Lundbäck	Singles class 5	Y-A Jung (KOR); L 0–3	Roden (FIJ); W 3–0	2 Q	—N/a	Abuawad (JOR); W 3–0	Zhang (CHN); L 1–3	Y-A Jung (KOR); L 1–3	4
Anna-Carin Ahlquist; Ingela Lundbäck	Team class 4–5	—N/a			Bye	Mexico (MEX); W 2–1	Serbia (SRB); L 1–2	South Korea (KOR); L 1–2	4

== Wheelchair rugby ==
Summary

Key:

- ET: After Extra Time
- P – Match decided by penalty-shootout.

Team	Group Stage				Semifinal	Final / BM	
Team	Opposition Score	Opposition Score	Opposition Score	Rank	Opposition Score	Opposition Score	Rank
Sweden	Japan; L 46–50	United States; L 44–54	France; W 55–47	3	Did not advance	Great Britain; L 42–56	6

Sweden qualified by reaching the final of the 2015 International Wheelchair Rugby Federation European Championship.

- Team competition – one team of 12 players

Roster

The following is the Sweden roster in the wheelchair rugby tournament of the 2016 Summer Paralympics.

Name	Class.	Date of birth (age)	Club	Residence
Glenn Adaszak	0.5	9 January 1983 (aged 33)	Köping Hillbillies	Kungsör
Claes Bertilsson	0.5	25 July 1986 (aged 30)	Gothenburg Lions	
Andreas Collin	2.5	19 March 1986 (aged 30)	Rehab Alpin	Västra Frölunda
Thomas Eriksson	2.5	6 April 1960 (aged 56)	Nacka HI	
Tomas Hjert	2.5	22 June 1989 (aged 27)	Nacka HI	Trångsund
Stefan Jansson	1.0	6 March 1985 (aged 31)	Köping Hillbillies	Järfälla
Roger Lindberg	2.0	11 January 1972 (aged 44)	Köping Hillbillies	
Rickard Löfgren	0.5	17 August 1971 (aged 45)	Nacka HI	Upplands Väsby
Mikael Norlin	2.5	20 February 1974 (aged 42)	Malmö FIFH	Malmö
Loa Rissmar	3.0	9 May 1963 (aged 53)	Nacka HI	
Tobias Sandberg	3.5	28 June 1984 (aged 32)	Malmö FIFH	Lidingö
Lars Varnerud	1.5	9 October 1982 (aged 33)	Köping Hillbillies	

Preliminary round

Pos	Team	Pld	W	D	L	GF	GA	GD	Pts	Qualification
1	United States	3	3	0	0	165	142	+23	6	Semi-finals
2	Japan	3	2	0	1	163	155	+8	4	Semi-finals
3	Sweden	3	1	0	2	145	151	−6	2	Fifth place Match
4	France	3	0	0	3	141	166	−25	0	Seventh place Match

Source: Rio2016
14 September 2016
16:00

Japan	50–46	Sweden
	Report

Carioca Arena 1, Rio de Janeiro
Referee: Mitch Carr, Darren Roberts

15 September 2016
10:30

Sweden	44–54	United States
	Report

Carioca Arena 1, Rio de Janeiro
Referee: Alexander Schriener, Lukasz Symczak

16 September 2016
10:30

France	47–55	Sweden
	Report

Carioca Arena 1, Rio de Janeiro
Referee: Mitch Carr, Jean Choiniere

Fifth place Match

17 September 2016
19:15

Great Britain	56–42	Sweden
	Report

Carioca Arena 1, Rio de Janeiro
Referee: Lukasz Symczak

== Wheelchair tennis ==
Stefan Olsson and Dan Wallin have been selected by Sweden's Paralympic Committee. Stefan Olsson qualified via the standard qualification route, while Dan Wallin qualified via a Doubles World Ranking Allocation place.

Athlete	Event	Round of 64	Round of 32	Round of 16	Quarterfinals	Semifinals	Final / BM	
Athlete	Event	Opposition Score	Opposition Score	Opposition Score	Opposition Score	Opposition Score	Opposition Score	Rank
Stefan Olsson	Men's singles	Bye	Weekes (AUS); W 6–0, 6–3	Sanada (JPN); W 6–2, 7–6	Hewett (GBR); L 1–6, 6–2, 3–6	Did not advance		
Dan Wallin	Men's singles	Denayer (BEL); W 6–2, 6–2	Reid (GBR); L 1–6, 2–6	Did not advance				
Stefan Olsson; Dan Wallin	Men's doubles	—N/a	Baldwin / Rydberg (USA); W 6–3, 6–2	Cattanéo / Jérémiasz (FRA); L 3–6, 1–6	Did not advance			

== See also ==
- Sweden at the 2016 Summer Olympics
