= Qian Hongyan =

Chinese Paralympic swimmer

Personal information
- Native name: 钱红艳
- Nationality: Chinese
- Born: 1996 (age 29–30) Luliang County

Qian Hongyan is a Chinese para swimmer.

Qian grew up in Zhuangshang Village, Majie Town, Luliang County, Yunnan province. At age 4 she lost both legs after being hit by a truck while crossing the road. One of her friends died in this accident. Unable to afford prosthetic legs, her grandfather modified a basketball to support her moving around.

In 2005, she was featured in a traffic safety documentary. A local news reporter took pity on her after seeing her situation and, thanks to donations, she was able to get prosthetic legs.

When China's first para swimming club was established, Qian was among the first to join. She won several gold medals in provincial and national competitions and participated in the 2016 Summer Paralympics, reaching 9th place in the Women's 100 metre breaststroke SB5. In 2023 she participated in the 2022 Asian Para Games.
