= Swimming at the 2016 Summer Paralympics – Women's 100 metre breaststroke SB5 =

Women's 100 metre breaststroke SB5 at the XV Paralympic Games
- Venue: Olympic Aquatics Stadium
- Dates: 11 September 2016
- Competitors: 13 from 10 nations

Medalists
1st place, gold medalist(s)		Yelyzaveta Mereshko	Ukraine
2nd place, silver medalist(s)		Viktoriia Savtsova	Ukraine
3rd place, bronze medalist(s)		Lingling Song	China

The women's 100 metre breaststroke SB5 event at the 2016 Paralympic Games took place on 11 September 2016, at the Olympic Aquatics Stadium. Two heats were held. The swimmers with the eight fastest times advanced to the final.

== Heats ==
=== Heat 1 ===
9:39 11 September 2016:

Rank	Lane	Name	Nationality	Time	Notes
1	4	Yelyzaveta Mereshko	Ukraine	1:43.41	Q
2	5	Fanni Illes	Hungary	1:47.02	Q
3	6	Emanuela Romano	Italy	1:50.90	Q
4	3	Hongyan Qian	China	1:57.17	
5	2	Susana Ribeiro	Brazil	1:57.42	
6	7	Gitta Raczko	Hungary	1:58.76	

=== Heat 2 ===
9:44 11 September 2016:

Rank	Lane	Name	Nationality	Time	Notes
1	4	Viktoriia Savtsova	Ukraine	1:41.03	Q
2	5	Lingling Song	China	1:45.79	Q
3	3	Verena Schott	Germany	1:49.38	Q
4	6	Thi Bich Nhu Trinh	Vietnam	1:52.06	Q
5	2	Sabine Weber-Treiber	Austria	1:53.73	Q
6	7	Thelma Bjorg Bjornsdottir	Iceland	1:58.69	
7	1	Maga Hovakimyan	Armenia	2:22.57	

== Final ==
17:37 11 September 2016:

Rank	Lane	Name	Nationality	Time	Notes
1st place, gold medalist(s)	5	Yelyzaveta Mereshko	Ukraine	1:41.63	
2nd place, silver medalist(s)	4	Viktoriia Savtsova	Ukraine	1:42.14	
3rd place, bronze medalist(s)	3	Lingling Song	China	1:45.21	
4	2	Verena Schott	Germany	1:46.07	
5	6	Fanni Illes	Hungary	1:48.14	
6	1	Thi Bich Nhu Trinh	Vietnam	1:51.07	
7	7	Emanuela Romano	Italy	1:52.33	
	8	Sabine Weber-Treiber	Austria		DSQ
