= Li Tingshen =

Chinese Paralympic swimmer

Personal information
- Born: 1987 or 1988 (age 38–39) Zhangzhou

Sport
- Country: China
- Sport: Para swimming
Medal record
Men's para swimming
Representing China
Summer Paralympics
Silver medal – second place	2016 Rio de Janeiro	50 m breaststroke SB2

Li Tingshen is a Chinese Paralympic swimmer. He represented China at the 2016 Summer Paralympics held in Rio de Janeiro, Brazil and he won the silver medal in the men's 50 metre breaststroke SB2 event.
