= Huang Chaowen =

Chinese paralympic swimmer

Sport
- Country: China
- Sport: Swimming
Medal record
Representing China
Paralympic Games
Swimming
Bronze medal – third place	2016 Rio de Janeiro	Men's 50 metre breaststroke SB2

Huang Chaowen is a Chinese paralympic swimmer. He participated at the 2016 Summer Paralympics in the swimming competition, being awarded the bronze medal in the men's 50 metre breaststroke SB2 event.
