= Iurii Bozhynskyi =

Ukrainian Paralympic swimmer

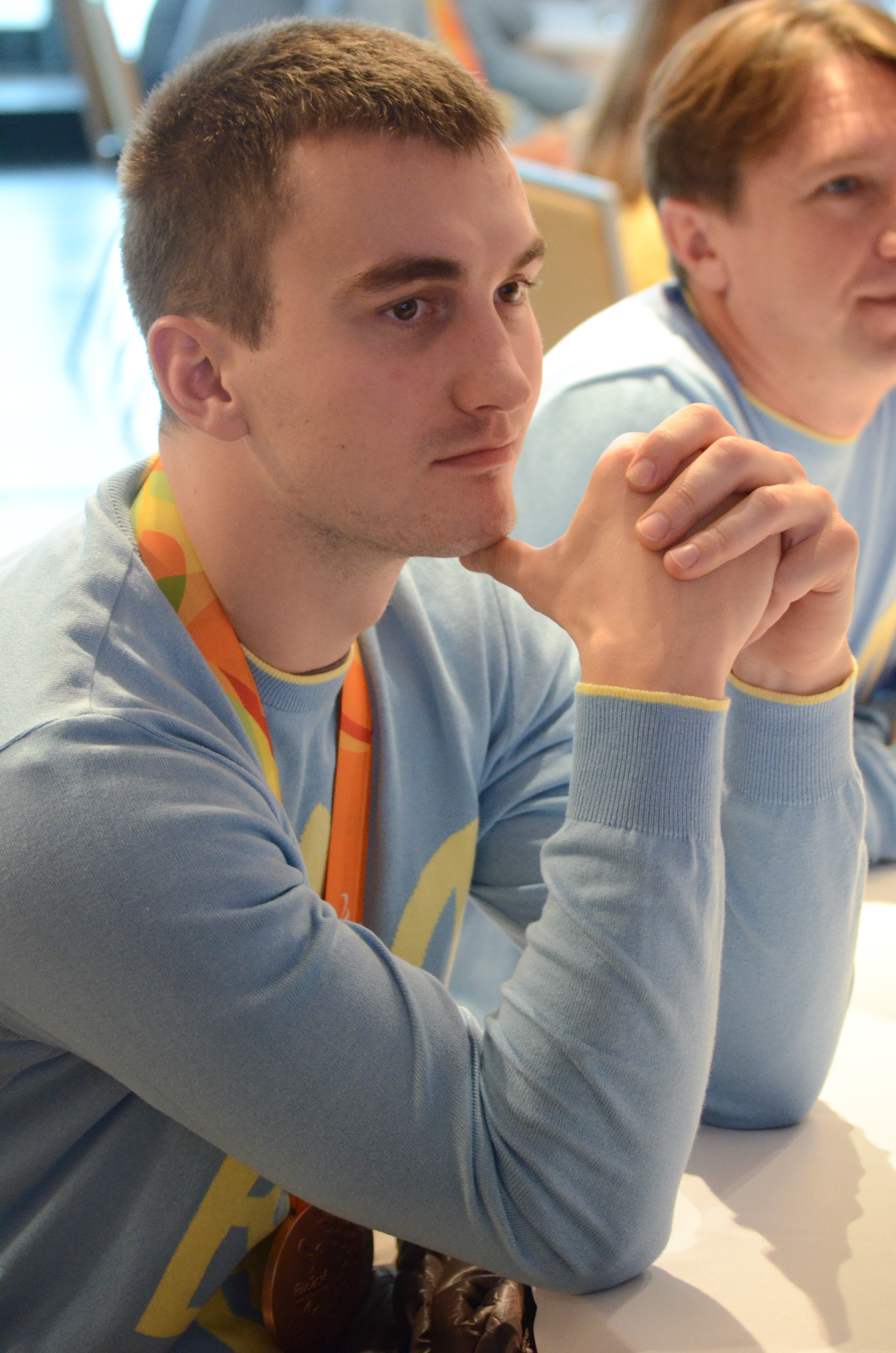
- Bozhynskyi in 2016

Personal information
- Born: 16 May 1992 (age 34)

Sport
- Country: Ukraine
- Sport: Paralympic swimming
Medal record
Men's para swimming
Representing Ukraine
Paralympic Games
Silver medal – second place	2016 Rio de Janeiro	4 × 100 m medley relay 34pts
Bronze medal – third place	2016 Rio de Janeiro	50 m freestyle S8
Bronze medal – third place	2020 Tokyo	4×100 m freestyle 34 pts

Iurii Bozhynskyi (Ukrainian: Юрій Петрович Божинський; born 16 May 1992) is a Ukrainian Paralympic swimmer. He represented Ukraine at the 2016 Summer Paralympics in Rio de Janeiro, Brazil and he won two medals: the silver medal in the men's 4 × 100 m medley relay 34pts event and the bronze medal in the men's 50 m freestyle S8 event.

He also won the bronze medal in the men's 4×100 metre freestyle relay 34pts event at the 2020 Summer Paralympics held in Tokyo, Japan.

Master of Sport of International Class of Ukraine in swimming, bronze medalist of the 2013 World Championship, European champion of 2014, two-time silver medalist and bronze medalist of the 2015 World Championship, two-time silver (4x100 m relay, 100 m backstroke) and bronze (50 m freestyle) winner of the European Championship 2016, Paralympic champion and winner of 2016.
