= Karl Forsman =

Swedish Paralympic swimmer

Personal information
- Nationality: Swedish
- Born: 7 December 1996 (age 29) Östersund, Sweden

Sport
- Country: Sweden
- Sport: Para swimming
- Disability class: S5 and S6

Achievements and titles
- Paralympic finals: Rio 2016
Medal record
Men's para swimming
Representing Sweden
Paralympic Games
Gold medal – first place	2016 Rio	100 m breaststroke SB5
IPC Swimming World Championships
Silver medal – second place	2015 Glasgow	100 m breaststroke SB5

Karl Forsman (born 7 December 1996 in Östersund, Sweden) is a Swedish male swimmer, competing at the S5 and S6 classes, and current Paralympic Champion of the men's 100 m breaststroke (SB5).

With a silver medal from the men's 100 metre breaststroke at the 2015 IPC Swimming World Championships, Forsman qualified for the 2016 Summer Paralympics in Rio de Janeiro. Forsman won a gold medal when swimming the men's 100 m breaststroke (SB5) at the 2016 Summer Paralympics with the time 1:34:27.
