= Maja Reichard =

Swedish Paralympic swimmer

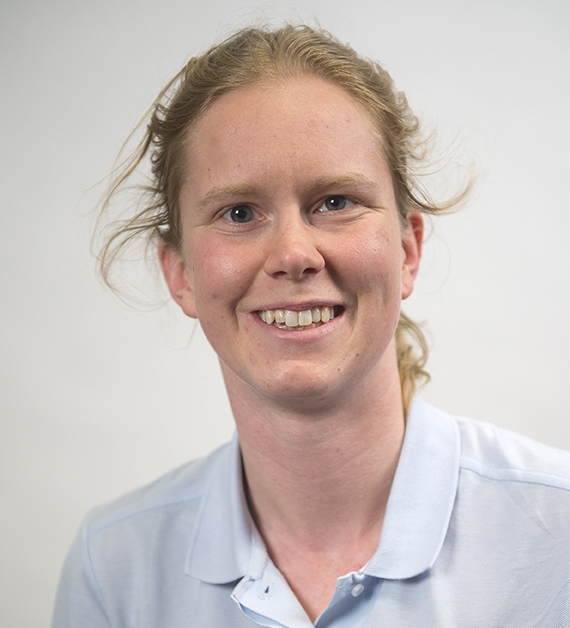

Personal information
- Nationality: Swedish
- Born: 27 May 1991 (age 35) Nacka, Sweden

Sport
- Country: Sweden
- Sport: Para swimming
- Disability class: S11, SB11, SM11
Medal record
Women's para swimming
Representing Sweden
Paralympic Games
Gold medal – first place	2012 London	SB11 100 m breaststroke
Silver medal – second place	2016 Rio	S11 50 m freestyle
Silver medal – second place	2016 Rio	SM11 200 m individual medley
Bronze medal – third place	2016 Rio	S11 100 m backstroke
Bronze medal – third place	2016 Rio	SB11 100 m breaststroke
World Championships
Gold medal – first place	2010 Eindhoven	S11 100 m breaststroke
Gold medal – first place	2013 Montreal	SB11 100 m breaststroke
Gold medal – first place	2015 Glasgow	100m breaststroke SB11
Bronze medal – third place	2013 Montreal	S11 50 m freestyle
Bronze medal – third place	2013 Montreal	S11 100 m butterfly
Bronze medal – third place	2013 Montreal	SM11 200 m medley
Bronze medal – third place	2015 Glasgow	200m medley SM11
Bronze medal – third place	2015 Glasgow	50m freestyle S11
European Championships
Gold medal – first place	2014 Eindhoven	SB11 100 m breaststroke
Gold medal – first place	2016 Funchal	50 m freestyle S11
Gold medal – first place	2016 Funchal	100 m breaststroke SB11
Silver medal – second place	2014 Eindhoven	S11 50 m freestyle
Silver medal – second place	2016 Funchal	100 m freestyle S11
Silver medal – second place	2016 Funchal	200m medley SM11
Bronze medal – third place	2014 Eindhoven	S11 100 m freestyle
Bronze medal – third place	2014 Eindhoven	SM11 200 m medley
- Updated on 31 May 2016

Maja Reichard (born 27 May 1991) is a Swedish swimmer. She has a visual impairment caused by retinitis pigmentosa and competes in the S11 disability class. She's the reigning paralympic champion in 100 m breaststroke.

Reichard won a gold medal at the 2010 IPC Swimming World Championships in the 100 m breaststroke. She entered four events at the 2012 Paralympics and came first in the 100 m breaststroke. She gained four medals, including one gold, at the 2013 World Championships and a further four at the 2014 European Championships. She also won a bronze in 100 m backstroke at the 2016 Summer Paralympics in Rio de Janeiro.
