= Javier Hernández Aguiran =

Spanish Paralympic swimmer (born 1979)

Javier Hernández
Personal information
- Full name: Javier Hernández Aguiran
- Nationality: Spanish
- Born: 13 June 1979 (age 47) Zaragoza, Aragon, Spain
- Height: 175 cm (5 ft 9 in)

Sport
- Country: Spain
- Sport: Swimming

Javier Hernández Aguiran (born 13 June 1979) is an armless Paralympic swimmer and sports journalist from Spain who represented the country at the 2012 Summer Paralympics, where he earned a Paralympic diploma with 33 years old. He started training at the age of 30.

== Personal ==
Hernandez was born without arms. He is from Zaragoza in Aragon. A graduate in Audiovisual Communication from the University Autónoma in Barcelona, he has worked as a sports journalist from 2001. He is the author of the authorised biography of the ex-Zaragoza striker Luciano Galletti.

Hernandez won an award at the 2012 Aragonés Sports Gala. In April 2013, he gave a motivational talk to Real Zaragoza before a game against Mallorca. The team, winless in 15 games at that time, went on to win the game, which Hernandez gave full credit to the team for doing. He made a speech in the box of honor of the Santiago Bernabeu (October 2013) and another one in the main theatre of Vila-Real in front of 500 persons.

== Swimming ==
He started training after age 30 and he has won 13 gold medals in different Spanish National Championships and he broke the 150 medley SM3 Spanish record in March 2012. He represented Spain at the 2012 London Paralympics, where he participated in 3 races: 150 medley SM3, 50 breastroke SB3 and 50 backstroke S3. He qualified for the 50 backstroke S3 final, where he finished eighth and earned a Paralympic diploma.
