= Huang Wenpan =

Chinese Paralympic swimmer

Personal information
- Born: 22 August 1995 Meishan, Sichuan, China
- Died: 15 March 2018 (aged 22) Hongya County, Meishan, Sichuan

Sport
- Country: China
- Sport: Swimming
Medal record
Representing China
Men's Paralympic swimming
Summer Paralympics
Gold medal – first place	2016 Rio de Janeiro	Men's 50 metre freestyle S3
Gold medal – first place	2016 Rio de Janeiro	Men's 200 metre freestyle S3
Gold medal – first place	2016 Rio de Janeiro	Men's 50 metre breaststroke SB2
Gold medal – first place	2016 Rio de Janeiro	Men's 150 metre individual medley SM3
Gold medal – first place	2016 Rio de Janeiro	Mixed 4 x 50 metre freestyle relay 20 points
Silver medal – second place	2016 Rio de Janeiro	Men's 50 metre backstroke S3

Huang Wenpan
- Chinese: 黄文攀
Transcriptions
Standard Mandarin
- Hanyu Pinyin: Huáng Wénpān

Huang Wenpan (22 August 1995 – 15 March 2018) was a Chinese Paralympic swimmer. He won five gold medals at the 2016 Summer Paralympics: at the Men's 50 metre freestyle S3 event with a world record and paralympic record of 39.24, at the Men's 200 metre freestyle S3 event with a world record and paralympic record of 3:09.04, at the Men's 50 metre breaststroke SB2 event with a world record and paralympic record of 50.65 at the Men's 150 metre individual medley SM3 event with a world record and paralympic record of 2:40.19. and at the Mixed 4 x 50 metre freestyle relay 20pts event with a world record and paralympic record of 2:18.03. He also won a silver medal at the Men's 50 metre backstroke S3 event with 46.11.

== Death ==
Huang Wenpan died on 16 March 2018 after succumbing to injuries following a car accident where he drove the car alone which crashed into a lamp post.
