= Michael DeMarco =

American Paralympic swimmer

Personal information
- Born: 19 March 1969 (age 57) La Jolla, California, United States
- Height: 1.83 m (6 ft 0 in)
- Weight: 75 kg (165 lb)

Sport
- Country: United States
- Sport: Paralympic swimming
- Disability: Cerebral palsy
- Disability class: S2
Medal record
Paralympic swimming
Representing United States
Paralympic Games
Bronze medal – third place	2004 Athens	50m breaststroke SB2
World Championships
Bronze medal – third place	2002 Mar del Plata	50m breaststroke SB2
Bronze medal – third place	2006 Durban	50m breaststroke SB2
Bronze medal – third place	2006 Durban	4x50m freestyle relay 20pts
Bronze medal – third place	2010 Eindhoven	50m breaststroke SB2

Michael DeMarco (born 19 March 1969) is a retired American Paralympic swimmer who competes at international elite competitions. He is a Paralympic bronze medalist and a four-time World bronze medalist and is a former American record holder.
