= Vincenzo Boni =

Italian Paralympic swimmer (born 1988)

Personal information
- Born: 1 March 1988 (age 38) Naples, Italy
- Website: www.vincenzoboni.it

Sport
- Country: Italy
- Sport: Paralympic swimming
- Disability: Charcot–Marie–Tooth disease
- Disability class: S3, SB2, SM3
- Club: Caravaggio Sporting Village – Fiamme Oro
- Coached by: Alessio Sigillo
Medal record
Men's para swimming
Representing Italy
Paralympic Games
Bronze medal – third place	2016 Rio de Janeiro	50 m backstroke S3
World Championships
Silver medal – second place	2015 Glasgow	50 m backstroke S3
Silver medal – second place	2022 Madeira	100m freestyle S3
Bronze medal – third place	2015 Glasgow	50 m freestyle S3
Bronze medal – third place	2015 Glasgow	200 m freestyle S3
Silver medal – second place	2017 Mexico City	50 m backstroke S3
Silver medal – second place	2023 Manchester	200 m freestyle S3
Bronze medal – third place	2017 Mexico City	50 m freestyle S3
Bronze medal – third place	2017 Mexico City	200 m freestyle S3
Bronze medal – third place	2022 Madeira	200 m freestyle S3
Bronze medal – third place	2023 Manchester	50 m backstroke S3
Bronze medal – third place	2023 Manchester	100 m freestyle S3
European Championships
Gold medal – first place	2016 Funchal	50 m backstroke S3
Gold medal – first place	2018 Dublin	50 m backstroke S3
Gold medal – first place	2018 Dublin	50 m freestyle S3
Gold medal – first place	2018 Dublin	200 m freestyle S3
Silver medal – second place	2016 Funchal	50 m freestyle S3
Silver medal – second place	2016 Funchal	4x50 m freestyle relay
Silver medal – second place	2016 Funchal	4x50 m medley relay
Bronze medal – third place	2016 Funchal	200 m freestyle S3

Vincenzo Boni (born 1 March 1988) is an Italian Paralympic swimmer with Charcot–Marie–Tooth disease.

== Career ==
He represented Italy at the 2016 Summer Paralympics and won a bronze medal in the men's 50 metre backstroke S3 event.

Boni is an athlete of the Gruppo Sportivo Fiamme Oro.
