= Ukraine at the 2016 Summer Paralympics =

- IPC code: UKR
- NPC: National Sports Committee for the Disabled of Ukraine
- Website: www.paralympic.org.ua

in Rio de Janeiro
- Competitors: 172 in 15 sports
- Flag bearers: Margaryta Pryvalykhina (opening); Taras Dutko (closing)
- Medals Ranked 3rd: Gold 41 Silver 37 Bronze 39 Total 117

Summer Paralympics appearances (overview)
- 1996; 2000; 2004; 2008; 2012; 2016; 2020; 2024

Other related appearances
- Soviet Union (1988); Unified Team (1992)

Ukraine competed at the 2016 Summer Paralympics in Rio de Janeiro, Brazil, from 7 September to 18 September 2016.

== Disability classifications ==
Every participant at the Paralympics has their disability grouped into one of five disability categories; amputation, the condition may be congenital or sustained through injury or illness; cerebral palsy; wheelchair athletes, there is often overlap between this and other categories; visual impairment, including blindness; Les autres, any physical disability that does not fall strictly under one of the other categories, for example dwarfism or multiple sclerosis. Each Paralympic sport then has its own classifications, dependent upon the specific physical demands of competition. Events are given a code, made of numbers and letters, describing the type of event and classification of the athletes competing. Some sports, such as athletics, divide athletes by both the category and severity of their disabilities, other sports, for example swimming, group competitors from different categories together, the only separation being based on the severity of the disability.

== Medalists ==
Medal	Name	Sport	Event
Gold	Ihor Tsvietov	Athletics	Men's 100m T35
Gold	Ihor Tsvietov	Athletics	Men's 200m T35
Gold	Leilia Adzhametova	Athletics	Women's 100m T13
Gold	Oksana Zubkovska	Athletics	Women's long jump F12
Gold	Yegor Dementyev	Cycling road	Men's road time trial C5
Gold	Yegor Dementyev	Cycling track	Men's individual pursuit C5
Gold	Football 7-a-side team	Football 7-a-side	Men's team
Gold	Inna Cherniak	Judo	Women's -57kg
Gold	Serhii Yemelianov	Paracanoe	Men's KL3
Gold	Lidiia Soloviova	Powerlifting	Women's -50kg
Gold	Roman Polianskyi	Rowing	Men's single sculls
Gold	Vasyl Kovalchuk	Shooting	Mixed 10m air rifle prone SH2
Gold	Maksym Krypak	Swimming	Men's 50m freestyle S10
Gold	Maksym Veraksa	Swimming	Men's 50m freestyle S12
Gold	Maksym Krypak	Swimming	Men's 100m freestyle S10
Gold	Maksym Krypak	Swimming	Men's 400m freestyle S10
Gold	Hennadii Boiko	Swimming	Men's 50m backstroke S1
Gold	Dmytro Vynohradets	Swimming	Men's 50m backstroke S3
Gold	Hennadii Boiko	Swimming	Men's 100m backstroke S1
Gold	Ievgenii Bogodaiko	Swimming	Men's 100m backstroke S7
Gold	Maksym Krypak	Swimming	Men's 100m backstroke S10
Gold	Dmytro Zalevskyi	Swimming	Men's 100m backstroke S11
Gold	Sergii Klippert	Swimming	Men's 100m backstroke S12
Gold	Ievgenii Bogodaiko	Swimming	Men's 100m breaststroke SB6
Gold	Oleksii Fedyna	Swimming	Men's 100m breaststroke SB13
Gold	Denys Dubrov	Swimming	Men's 100m butterfly S10
Gold	Ievgenii Bogodaiko	Swimming	Men's 200m individual medley SM7
Gold	Denys Dubrov	Swimming	Men's 200m individual medley SM10
Gold	Denys Dubrov; Bohdan Hrynenko; Maksym Krypak; Oleksandr Komarov	Swimming	Men's 4 × 100 m freestyle relay
Gold	Yelyzaveta Mereshko	Swimming	Women's 50m freestyle S6
Gold	Anna Stetsenko	Swimming	Women's 50m freestyle S13
Gold	Yelyzaveta Mereshko	Swimming	Women's 100m freestyle S6
Gold	Anna Stetsenko	Swimming	Women's 100m freestyle S13
Gold	Yelyzaveta Mereshko	Swimming	Women's 400m freestyle S6
Gold	Anna Stetsenko	Swimming	Women's 100m backstroke S13
Gold	Yelyzaveta Mereshko	Swimming	Women's 100m breaststroke SB5
Gold	Kateryna Istomina	Swimming	Women's 100m butterfly S8
Gold	Men's team class 6-8	Table tennis	Men's team C6-8
Gold	Natalia Kosmina	Table tennis	Women's singles C11
Gold	Andrii Demchuk	Wheelchair fencing	Men's sabre A
Gold	Anton Datsko	Wheelchair fencing	Men's sabre B
Silver	Roman Pavlyk	Athletics	Men's 400m T36
Silver	Oksana Boturchuk	Athletics	Women's 200 metres T12
Silver	Oksana Boturchuk	Athletics	Women's 400 metres T12
Silver	Natalia Iezlovetska	Athletics	Women's 400 metres T20
Silver	Mykola Dibrova	Athletics	Men's shot put F36
Silver	Anastasiia Mysnyk	Athletics	Women's shot put F20
Silver	Mariia Pomazan	Athletics	Women's shot put F35
Silver	Zoia Ovsii	Athletics	Women's club throw F51
Silver	Dmytro Solovey	Judo	Men's -73kg
Silver	Oleksandr Nazarenko	Judo	Men's -90kg
Silver	Iryna Husieva	Judo	Women's -60kg
Silver	Nataliia Lagutenko	Paracanoe	Women's KL2
Silver	Olga Kovalchuk	Shooting	Women's 10m air pistol SH1
Silver	Dmytro Vynohradets	Swimming	Men's 50m freestyle S3
Silver	Ievgenii Bogodaiko	Swimming	Men's 50m freestyle S7
Silver	Bohdan Hrynenko	Swimming	Men's 50m freestyle S8
Silver	Iaroslav Denysenko	Swimming	Men's 100m freestyle S13
Silver	Dmytro Vynohradets	Swimming	Men's 200m freestyle S3
Silver	Denys Dubrov	Swimming	Men's 400m freestyle S10
Silver	Iaroslav Denysenko	Swimming	Men's 400m freestyle S13
Silver	Iaroslav Denysenko	Swimming	Men's 100m backstroke S13
Silver	Denys Dubrov	Swimming	Men's 100m breaststroke SB9
Silver	Ievgenii Bogodaiko	Swimming	Men's 50m butterfly S7
Silver	Maksym Krypak	Swimming	Men's 100m butterfly S10
Silver	Dmytro Vynohradets	Swimming	Men's 150m individual medley SM3
Silver	Maksym Krypak	Swimming	Men's 200m individual medley SM10
Silver	Viktor Smyrnov	Swimming	Men's 200m individual medley SM11
Silver	Iaroslav Denysenko	Swimming	Men's 200m individual medley SM13
Silver	Ievgenii Bogodaiko; Iurii Bozhynskyi; Denys Dubrov; Maksym Krypak	Swimming	Men's 4 × 100 m medley relay
Silver	Viktoriia Savtsova	Swimming	Women's 50m freestyle S6
Silver	Viktoriia Savtsova	Swimming	Women's 100m freestyle S6
Silver	Anna Stetsenko	Swimming	Women's 400m freestyle S13
Silver	Yaryna Matlo	Swimming	Women's 100m backstroke S12
Silver	Mariia Lafina	Swimming	Women's 50m breaststroke SB3
Silver	Viktoriia Savtsova	Swimming	Women's 100m breaststroke SB5
Silver	Oksana Khrul	Swimming	Women's 50m butterfly S6
Silver	Olga Sviderska	Swimming	Women's 150m individual medley SM4
Bronze	Leilia Adzhametova	Athletics	Women's 400 metres T13
Bronze	Liudmyla Danylina	Athletics	Women's 1500 metres T20
Bronze	Ruslan Katyshev	Athletics	Men's long jump F11
Bronze	Dmytro Prudnikov	Athletics	Men's long jump F20
Bronze	Roman Pavlyk	Athletics	Men's long jump F36
Bronze	Roman Danyliuk	Athletics	Men's shot put F12
Bronze	Zoia Ovsii	Athletics	Women's discus throw F52
Bronze	Davyd Khorava	Judo	Men's -66kg
Bronze	Oleksandr Kosinov	Judo	Men's -81kg
Bronze	Yuliya Halinska	Judo	Women's -48kg
Bronze	Oleksii Denysiuk	Shooting	Mixed 50m pistol SH1
Bronze	Andrii Derevinskyi	Swimming	Men's 50m freestyle S4
Bronze	Iurii Bozhynskyi	Swimming	Men's 50m freestyle S8
Bronze	Denys Dubrov	Swimming	Men's 50m freestyle S10
Bronze	Illia Yaremenko	Swimming	Men's 50m freestyle S12
Bronze	Oleksandr Komarov	Swimming	Men's 100m freestyle S6
Bronze	Ievgenii Bogodaiko	Swimming	Men's 100m freestyle S7
Bronze	Maksym Veraksa	Swimming	Men's 100m freestyle S13
Bronze	Serhii Palamarchuk	Swimming	Men's 200m freestyle S2
Bronze	Anton Kol	Swimming	Men's 50m backstroke S1
Bronze	Serhii Palamarchuk	Swimming	Men's 50m backstroke S2
Bronze	Anton Kol	Swimming	Men's 100m backstroke S1
Bronze	Serhii Palamarchuk	Swimming	Men's 100m backstroke S2
Bronze	Iaroslav Semenenko	Swimming	Men's 100m backstroke S6
Bronze	Denys Dubrov	Swimming	Men's 100m backstroke S10
Bronze	Maksym Veraksa	Swimming	Men's 100m breaststroke SB12
Bronze	Oleksandr Mashchenko	Swimming	Men's 100m butterfly S11
Bronze	Dmytro Vanzenko	Swimming	Men's 200m individual medley SM10
Bronze	Danylo Chufarov	Swimming	Men's 200m individual medley SM13
Bronze	Maryna Piddubna	Swimming	Women's 50m freestyle S11
Bronze	Olga Sviderska	Swimming	Women's 100m freestyle S3
Bronze	Iryna Sotska	Swimming	Women's 50m backstroke S2
Bronze	Maryna Verbova	Swimming	Women's 50m backstroke S4
Bronze	Iryna Sotska	Swimming	Women's 100m backstroke S2
Bronze	Oksana Khrul	Swimming	Women's 100m backstroke S6
Bronze	Bohdan Hrynenko; Yelyzaveta Mereshko; Olga Sviderska; Dmytro Vynohradets	Swimming	Mixed 4x50m freestyle relay
Bronze	Maryna Lytovchenko	Table tennis	Women's singles C6
Bronze	Oleg Naumenko	Wheelchair fencing	Men's épée A
Bronze	Yevheniia Breus	Wheelchair fencing	Women's épée A

== 7-a-side football ==
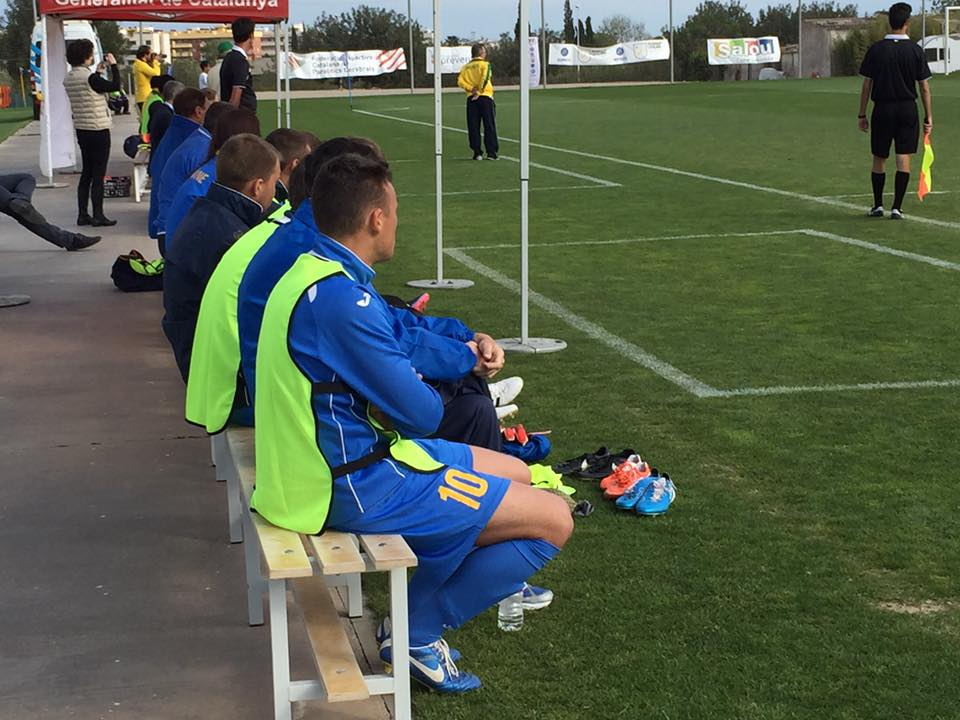
Ukrainian players watch the final game of the IFCPF Pre Paralympic Tournament Salou 2016 against Brazil from the bench.

The Ukraine national 7-a-side football team qualified for the Rio Games after finishing second at the 2015 CP World Championships after going down to Russia in the gold medal match. The country went to the tournament as reigning European champions. The team was in Group C with England and Portugal .

The draw for the tournament was held on May 6 at the 2016 Pre Paralympic Tournament in Salou, Spain. Ukraine was put into Group A with Brazil, Great Britain and Ireland. The tournament where the draw took place featured 7 of the 8 teams participating in Rio. It was the last major preparation event ahead of the Rio Games for all teams participating. Ukraine finished first, after defeating Brazil 0 - 2 in the 1st place match. Their roster for this tournament included Konstiantyn Symashko, Denys Ponomarov, Taras Dutko, Edhar Kahramanian, Yevhen Zinoviev, Stanislav Podolskyi, Volodymyr Antoniuk, Vitaliy Trushev, Artem Krasylnykov, Bohdan Kulynych, Ivan Shkvarlo, Vitalii Romanchuk, Oleh Len and Serhii Zinchenko.

Going into the Rio Games, the country was ranked first in the world.

Pos	Team	Pld	W	D	L	GF	GA	GD	Pts	Qualification
1	Ukraine	3	3	0	0	10	2	+8	9	Semi finals
2	Brazil (H)	3	2	0	1	10	4	+6	6	Semi finals
3	Great Britain	3	1	0	2	7	5	+2	3	5th–6th place match
4	Ireland	3	0	0	3	2	18	−16	0	7th–8th place match

Source: Paralympic.org
(H) Hosts

== Archery ==
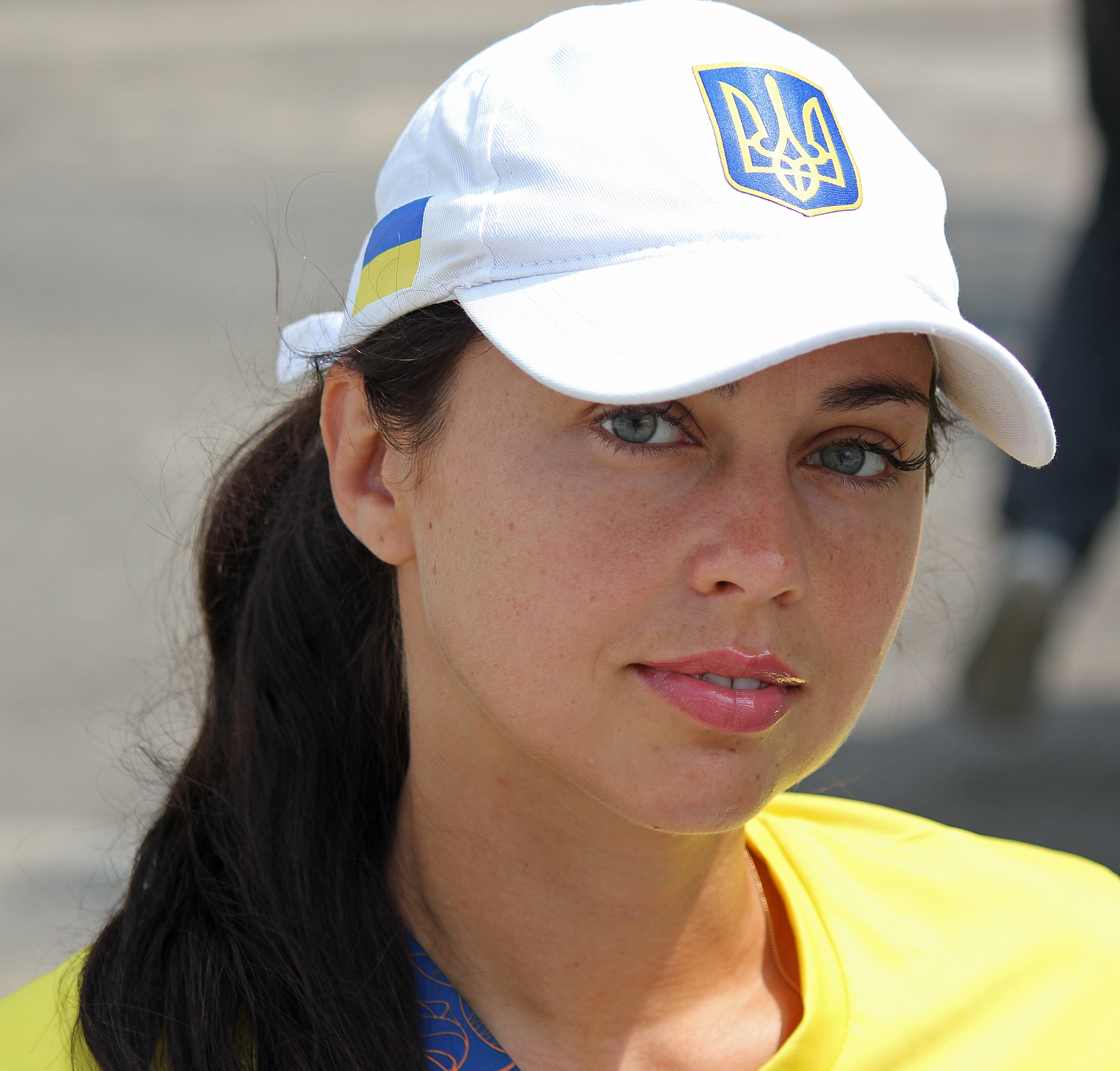
Ukraine archer, Kseniya Markitantova

Ukraine qualified two archers for the Rio Games following their performance at the 2015 World Archery Para Championships, with both spots coming in the women's recurve open. Roksolana Dzoba-Balyan and Iryna Volynets both qualified the Ukraine after qualifying for the round of sixteen. Dzoba-Balyan is nicknamed Dzoba-Balyan, lives in Lviv and took up the sport in 2007. She is coached by Ilyashenko Oleh. The right handed archer shoots 27" long arrows with a draw weight of 36 lbs. In 2015, she was ranked fourth in the world.

== Cycling ==
With one pathway for qualification being one highest ranked NPCs on the UCI Para-Cycling male and female Nations Ranking Lists on 31 December 2014, Ukraine qualified for the 2016 Summer Paralympics in Rio, assuming they continued to meet all other eligibility requirements.

== Goalball ==
Ukraine's women enter the tournament ranked 15th in the world.

The following is the Ukraine roster in the women's goalball tournament of the 2016 Summer Paralympics.

No.	Player	Class	Date of birth (age)
1	Olena Rud	B2	2 June 1984 (aged 32)
2	Liliia Pasko	B2	1 March 1994 (aged 22)
3	Yuliia Maksymenko	B2	18 June 1994 (aged 22)
4	Maryna Gabeda	B2	3 September 1992 (aged 24)
5	Tetiana Govorukha	B2	26 December 1984 (aged 31)
7	Nataliia Miroshnyk	B2	8 October 1987 (aged 28)

Pos	Team	Pld	W	D	L	GF	GA	GD	Pts	Qualification
1	Turkey	4	4	0	0	37	11	+26	12	Quarter-finals
2	China	4	3	0	1	21	14	+7	9	Quarter-finals
3	Canada	4	2	0	2	16	22	−6	6	Quarter-finals
4	Ukraine	4	0	1	3	9	17	−8	1	Quarter-finals
5	Australia	4	0	1	3	6	25	−19	1	

Source: Paralympic.org

10 September 2016; 10:15	Ukraine	2–2	Australia	Future Arena, Rio de Janeiro; Referees: Bülent Kimyon (TUR), Daniel Voltan (BRA)
10 September 2016; 10:15	Rud 2	Report	Horsburgh 1 Esdaile 1	Future Arena, Rio de Janeiro; Referees: Bülent Kimyon (TUR), Daniel Voltan (BRA)

11 September 2016; 14:30	Canada	3–2	Ukraine	Future Arena, Rio de Janeiro; Referees: Raquel Aguado (ESP), Daniel Voltan (BRA)
11 September 2016; 14:30	Burk 2 Bogart 1	Report	Rud 2	Future Arena, Rio de Janeiro; Referees: Raquel Aguado (ESP), Daniel Voltan (BRA)

12 September 2016; 20:45	Turkey	6–3	Ukraine	Future Arena, Rio de Janeiro; Referees: Rudi Janssen (BEL), Nejc Jakic (SLO)
12 September 2016; 20:45	Mercan 2 Altunoluk 2 Özcan 1 Yıldız 1	Report	Rud 2 Govorukha 1	Future Arena, Rio de Janeiro; Referees: Rudi Janssen (BEL), Nejc Jakic (SLO)

13 September 2016; 19:30	Ukraine	2–6	China	Future Arena, Rio de Janeiro; Referees: Bülent Kimyon (TUR), Vilma Basinkaite (LTU)
13 September 2016; 19:30	Rud 1 Miroshnyk 1	Report	Zhang W. 3 Chen 3	Future Arena, Rio de Janeiro; Referees: Bülent Kimyon (TUR), Vilma Basinkaite (LTU)

14 September 2016; 10:30	Brazil	10–0	Ukraine	Future Arena, Rio de Janeiro; Referees: Dawna Christy (CAN), Raili Sipura (FIN)
14 September 2016; 10:30	Amorim 7 Custodio 2 Rocha 1	Report		Future Arena, Rio de Janeiro; Referees: Dawna Christy (CAN), Raili Sipura (FIN)

== Judo ==
With one pathway for qualification being having a top finish at the 2014 IBSA Judo World Championships, Ukraine earned a qualifying spot in Rio base on the performance of Nataliya Nikolaychyk in the women's -52 kg event. The B2 Judoka finished first in her class. Inna Cherniak earned the country a second spot in the women's -57 kg event. Iryna Husieva grabbed a third spot for Ukraine in the women's -63 kg event.

== Paracanoeing ==
Ukraine earned a qualifying spot at the 2016 Summer Paralympics in this sport following their performance at the 2015 ICF Canoe Sprint & Paracanoe World Championships in Milan, Italy where the top six finishers in each Paralympic event earned a qualifying spot for their nation. Oleksandr Hrechko earned the spot for Ukraine after finishing seventh in the men's KL1 event, but as each NPC gets only one spot and another country had two ahead of him, he qualified. Svitlana Kupriianova earned another spot for Ukraine after finishing third in the women's KL1 event. Mykola Syniuk earned a third spot for Ukraine after finishing fifth in the men's KL2 event. Nataliia Lagutenko earned a fourth spot for Ukraine after finishing fourth in the women's KL2 event. Serhii Yemelianov earned a fifth spot for Ukraine after finishing fifth in the men's KL3 event.

== Rowing ==
One pathway for qualifying for Rio involved having a boat have top eight finish at the 2015 FISA World Rowing Championships in a medal event. Ukraine qualified for the 2016 Games under this criterion in the AS Men's Single Sculls event with a third-place finish in a time of 04:51.700. They qualified a second boat in the TA Mixed Double Sculls event with a fourth-place finish in a time of 04:07.280. Ukraine qualified a third boat with a sixth-place finish in the LTA Mixed Coxed Four event in a time of 03:35.510, fifteen seconds behind first-place finisher, Great Britain, who had a time of 03:19.560.

== Shooting ==
The first opportunity to qualify for shooting at the Rio Games took place at the 2014 IPC Shooting World Championships in Suhl. Shooters earned spots for their NPC. Ukraine earned a qualifying spot at this event in the R1 – 10m Air Rifle standing men SH1 event as a result of Andrii Doroshenko winning a bronze medal. Iryna Liakhu earned Ukraine a second spot with her finish in the P3 – 25m Pistol Mixed SH1 event. Vasyl Kovalchuk gave Ukraine a third spot in the R4 – 10m Air Rifle Standing Mixed SH2 event. Olga Mustafaieva earned her country their final Rio place at this event based on her performance in the P4 – 50m Pistol Mixed SH1 event.

The country sent shooters to 2015 IPC Shooting World Cup in Osijek, Croatia, where Rio direct qualification was also available. They earned a qualifying spot at this event based on the performance of Oleksii Denysiuk in the P3 – 25m Pistol Mixed SH1 event.

The last direct qualifying event for Rio in shooting took place at the 2015 IPC Shooting World Cup in Fort Benning in November. Iurii Stoviev earned a qualifying spot for their country at this competition in the R1 Men's 10m Air Rifle Standing SH1 event.

== Sitting volleyball ==
Ukraine men's national sitting volleyball team qualified for the 2016 Games at the 2016 World Qualifier.

=== Men ===
Pos	Team	Pld	W	L	Pts	SW	SL	SR	SPW	SPL	SPR	Qualification
1	Iran	3	3	0	6	9	0	MAX	228	173	1.318	Semi-finals
2	Bosnia and Herzegovina	3	2	1	5	6	3	2.000	206	184	1.120	Semi-finals
3	Ukraine	3	1	2	4	3	8	0.375	237	265	0.894	Classification 5th / 6th
4	China	3	0	3	3	2	9	0.222	216	265	0.815	Classification 7th / 8th

Source: Paralympic.org

10 September 2016; 20:30	Bosnia and Herzegovina	3–0	Ukraine	Riocentro - Pavilion 6, Rio de Janeiro
10 September 2016; 20:30	(25–12, 25–22, 25–20); Report			Riocentro - Pavilion 6, Rio de Janeiro

12 September 2016; 14:00	China	2–3	Ukraine	Riocentro - Pavilion 6, Rio de Janeiro
12 September 2016; 14:00	(28–26, 25–23, 23–25, 22–25, 14–16); Report			Riocentro - Pavilion 6, Rio de Janeiro

14 September 2016; 20:30	Ukraine	0–3	Iran	Riocentro - Pavilion 6, Rio de Janeiro
14 September 2016; 20:30	(22–25, 26–28, 20–25); Report			Riocentro - Pavilion 6, Rio de Janeiro

=== Women ===
Pos	Team	Pld	W	L	Pts	SW	SL	SR	SPW	SPL	SPR	Qualification
1	Brazil (H)	3	3	0	6	9	0	MAX	225	140	1.607	Semi-finals
2	Ukraine	3	2	1	5	6	5	1.200	237	229	1.035	Semi-finals
3	Netherlands	3	1	2	4	5	7	0.714	250	265	0.943	Classification 5th / 6th
4	Canada	3	0	3	3	1	9	0.111	169	247	0.684	Classification 7th / 8th

Source: Paralympic.org
(H) Host

9 September 2016; 20:30	Ukraine	3–2	Netherlands	Riocentro - Pavilion 6, Rio de Janeiro
9 September 2016; 20:30	(21–25, 22–25, 25–13, 26–24, 15–12); Report			Riocentro - Pavilion 6, Rio de Janeiro

11 September 2016; 20:30	Brazil	3–0	Ukraine	Riocentro - Pavilion 6, Rio de Janeiro
11 September 2016; 20:30	(25–19, 25–20, 25–14); Report			Riocentro - Pavilion 6, Rio de Janeiro

13 September 2016; 18:30	Ukraine	3–0	Canada	Riocentro - Pavilion 6, Rio de Janeiro
13 September 2016; 18:30	(25–20, 25–19, 25–16); Report			Riocentro - Pavilion 6, Rio de Janeiro

== Swimming ==
The top two finishers in each Rio medal event at the 2015 IPC Swimming World Championships earned a qualifying spot for their country for Rio. Dmytro Vynohradets earned Ukraine a spot after winning gold in the Men's 200m Freestyle S3. A silver in the Mixed 4x50m Freestyle Relay 20pts event gave Ukraine its second spot in swimming in Rio. Kateryna Istomina earned a silver in the Women's 100m Butterfly S8 event to give Ukraine its third spot in Rio. The fourth spot by Ukraine was earned by Yelyzaveta Mereshko in the Women's 400m Freestyle S6 event where she won a gold medal. Anna Stetsenko earned a fifth spot for Ukraine after winning silver in the Women's 50m Freestyle S13. Hennadii Boiko grabbed a sixth spot for Ukraine in the Men's 100m Backstroke S1 with a gold, while teammate Anton Kol earned another spot by getting a silver in the event. Serhii Palamarchuk earned the country's eighth spot after winning gold in the Men's 100m Backstroke S2.

== See also ==
- Ukraine at the 2016 Summer Olympics
