= Du Jianping =

Chinese Paralympic swimmer

Medal record

Swimming (Paralympic swimming)

Representing China

Paralympic Games
Gold medal – first place	2008 Beijing	Men's 100 metre freestyle S2
Gold medal – first place	2008 Beijing	Men's 50 metre backstroke S3
Gold medal – first place	2008 Beijing	Men's 4 x 50 metre freestyle relay – 20 points
Gold medal – first place	2008 Beijing	Men's 4 x 50 metre medley relay – 20 points
Gold medal – first place	2012 London	Men's 50 metre breaststroke SB2
Gold medal – first place	2012 London	Men's 150 metre individual medley SM3
Silver medal – second place	2008 Beijing	Men's 50 metre freestyle S2
Bronze medal – third place	2008 Beijing	Men's 200 metre freestyle S2
Bronze medal – third place	2012 London	Men's 50 metre backstroke S3

Du Jianping (born October 31, 1983) is a Chinese swimmer. At the 2012 Summer Paralympics he won 2 gold medals and 1 bronze medal.
