= Cristopher Tronco Sánchez =

Mexican Paralympic swimmer

Cristopher Tronco
Personal information
- Full name: Cristopher Gregorio Tronco Sánchez
- Born: November 17, 1985 (age 40) Mexico City, Distrito Federal

Sport
- Sport: Swimming
Medal record
Swimming
Representing Mexico
World Championships
Gold medal – first place	2002 Mar del Plata	150m individual medley SM2
Silver medal – second place	2006 Durban	50m breaststroke SB2
Silver medal – second place	2023 Manchester	50m breaststroke SB2
Bronze medal – third place	2017 Mexico City	50m breaststroke SB2
Parapan American Games
Gold medal – first place	2015 Toronto	50m freestyle S3
Silver medal – second place	2007 Rio de Janeiro	50m freestyle S3
Silver medal – second place	2007 Rio de Janeiro	50m breaststroke SB3
Silver medal – second place	2011 Guadalajara	50m freestyle S3
Silver medal – second place	2011 Guadalajara	50m breaststroke SB3
Silver medal – second place	2019 Lima	50m backstroke S1/2
Silver medal – second place	2019 Lima	100m backstroke S1/2
Silver medal – second place	2019 Lima	50m breaststroke SB2
Silver medal – second place	2023 Santiago	50m backstroke S2
Silver medal – second place	2023 Santiago	50m breaststroke SB2
Bronze medal – third place	2007 Rio de Janeiro	100 m freestyle S3
Bronze medal – third place	2007 Rio de Janeiro	50 m backstroke S3
Bronze medal – third place	2023 Santiago	50m freestyle S2

Cristopher Gregorio Tronco Sánchez (Note: In this Spanish name, the first or paternal surname is Tronco and the second or maternal family name is Sánchez.) (born November 17, 1985) is a Mexican swimmer.

== Career ==
He represented Mexico at the 2007 Pan American Games and the 2008 Summer Paralympics, as well as London 2012 and Rio 2016, where he made it to a final
