= Mikael Fredriksson =

Swedish Paralympic swimmer

Personal information
- Born: 15 October 1990 (age 35) Lindesberg, Sweden
- Height: 1.76 m (5 ft 9 in)
- Weight: 65 kg (143 lb)

Sport
- Country: Sweden
- Sport: Para swimming
- Disability: Arthrogryposis
- Disability class: S3
- Retired: 2020
Medal record
Paralympic swimming
Representing Sweden
World Championships (LC)
Silver medal – second place	2013 Montreal	50m butterfly S3
Bronze medal – third place	2013 Montreal	50m backstroke S3
World Championships (SC)
Silver medal – second place	2009 Rio de Janeiro	150m individual medley SM3
Bronze medal – third place	2009 Rio de Janeiro	50m freestyle S3
Bronze medal – third place	2009 Rio de Janeiro	50m backstroke S4
European Championships
Silver medal – second place	2018 Dublin	150m individual medley SM3
Bronze medal – third place	2014 Eindhoven	50m backstroke S3
Bronze medal – third place	2016 Madeira	150m individual medley SM3

Mikael Fredriksson (born 15 October 1990) is a Swedish retired Paralympic swimmer who competed at international swimming competitions. He is three-time World and European medalist, he has also competed at the 2012 and 2016 Summer Paralympics but did not medal.
