= Li Hanhua =

Chinese Paralympic swimmer

Personal information
- Nationality: Chinese
- Born: 26 February 1982 (age 44)

Sport
- Sport: Swimming
Medal record
Men's para swimming
Representing China
Paralympic Games
Gold medal – first place	2016 Rio	Mixed 4×50 m freestyle
Bronze medal – third place	2016 Rio	50 m freestyle - S3
Bronze medal – third place	2016 Rio	100 m freestyle - S3
World Championships
Silver medal – second place	2015 Glasgow	50m freestyle - S3

Li Hanhua (born 26 February 1982) is a Chinese swimmer. He won a gold medal at the Mixed 4x50metre freestyle relay-20 Points event at the 2016 Summer Paralympics, where he swam in the heats (with a time of 42.35) but not in the final race, where the team won with 2:18.03, a world record and paralympic record. He also won a bronze medal at the Men's 50 metre Freestyle S3 event with 42.18 and another bronze medal at the Men's 100 metre freestyle S3 event with 3:23.10.
