= Mexico at the 2016 Summer Paralympics =

- IPC code: MEX
- NPC: Federacion Mexicana de Deporte

in Rio de Janeiro
- Competitors: 71 in 9 sports
- Flag bearer: Nely Miranda
- Medals Ranked 29th: Gold 4 Silver 2 Bronze 9 Total 15

Summer Paralympics appearances (overview)
- 1972; 1976; 1980; 1984; 1988; 1992; 1996; 2000; 2004; 2008; 2012; 2016; 2020; 2024

Mexico participated at the 2016 Summer Paralympics in Rio de Janeiro, Brazil, from 7 to 18 September 2016. The country sent a 71-member delegation to the Games.

== Disability classifications ==
Every participant at the Paralympics has their disability grouped into one of five disability categories; amputation, the condition may be congenital or sustained through injury or illness; cerebral palsy; wheelchair athletes, there is often overlap between this and other categories; visual impairment, including blindness; Les autres, any physical disability that does not fall strictly under one of the other categories, for example dwarfism or multiple sclerosis. Each Paralympic sport then has its own classifications, dependent upon the specific physical demands of competition. Events are given a code, made of numbers and letters, describing the type of event and classification of the athletes competing. Some sports, such as athletics, divide athletes by both the category and severity of their disabilities, other sports, for example swimming, group competitors from different categories together, the only separation being based on the severity of the disability.

== Medalists ==
Medal	Name	Sport	Event	Date
Gold	María de los Ángeles Ortíz	Athletics	Women's shot put F57/58	September 8
Gold	Eduardo Ávila	Judo	Men's 81 kg	September 9
Gold	Amalia Pérez	Powerlifting	Women's 55 kg	September 10
Gold	Lenia Ruvalcaba	Judo	Women's 70 kg	September 10
Silver	Luis Alberto Zepeda Félix	Athletics	Men's javelin throw F53/54	September 9
Silver	Edgar Cesareo Navarro Sánchez	Athletics	Men's 400 metres T51	September 17
Bronze	Salvador Hernández	Athletics	Men's 100 metres T52	September 10
Bronze	Pedro Rangel	Swimming	Men's 100 metres SB5	September 11
Bronze	Edgar Cesareo Navarro Sánchez	Athletics	Men's 100 metres T51	September 13
Bronze	Catalina Díaz Vilchis	Powerlifting	Women's 86 kg	September 13
Bronze	José de Jesús Castillo	Powerlifting	Men's 97 kg	September 13
Bronze	Rebeca Valenzuela	Athletics	Women's shot put F12	September 14
Bronze	Patricia Valle	Swimming	Women's 50 m breaststroke SB3	September 14
Bronze	Jesús Hernández Hernández	Swimming	Men's 50 m backstroke S4	September 16
Bronze	Nely Miranda	Swimming	Women's 50 m freestyle S4	September 17

=== Medals by sport ===
Medals by sport
	Sport	Gold medal	Silver medal	Bronze medal	Total
1	Judo	2	0	0	2
2	Athletics	1	2	3	6
3	Powerlifting	1	0	2	3
4	Swimming	0	0	4	4
Total		4	2	9	15

== Cycling ==
With one pathway for qualification being one highest ranked NPCs on the UCI Para-Cycling male and female Nations Ranking Lists on 31 December 2014, Mexico qualified for the 2016 Summer Paralympics in Rio, assuming they continued to meet all other eligibility requirements.

== Equestrian ==
Through the Para Equestrian Individual Ranking List Allocation method, the country earned a pair of slots at the Rio Games for their two highest ranked equestrian competitors. These slots were irrespective of class ranking.

== Football 5-a-side ==
Mexico national football 5-a-side football team qualified for the Rio Paralympics at the 2015 Parapan American Games after defeating Colombia in the bronze medal match in a game that went to penalty kicks. Argentina and Brazil, who finished ahead of them, had already qualified for Rio 2016.

The following is the Mexico squad in the football 5-a-side tournament of the 2016 Summer Paralympics.

No.	Pos.	Player	Class	Date of birth (age)
1	GK	Javier Amozurrutia	Sighted	17 November 1980 (aged 35)
2	DF	Francisco Rangel	B1	26 October 1991 (aged 24)
4	DF	Pablo Millán	B1	28 June 1991 (aged 25)
5	DF	Marco Guerrero	B1	17 May 1990 (aged 26)
7	FW	Daniel Viera	B1	2 March 1997 (aged 19)
9	FW	Rubicel de la Cruz	B1	23 March 1994 (aged 22)
10	FW	Gustavo Arana	B1	10 September 1993 (aged 22)
11	FW	Jorge Lanzagorta	B1	30 December 1985 (aged 30)
12	GK	Cristian Ortiz	Sighted	20 September 1992 (aged 23)
14	FW	Omar Otero	B1	25 July 1991 (aged 25)

Group B

Pos	Team	Pld	W	D	L	GF	GA	GD	Pts	Qualification
1	Argentina	3	2	1	0	3	0	+3	7	Semi finals
2	China	3	2	1	0	3	0	+3	7	Semi finals
3	Spain	3	1	0	2	1	2	−1	3	5th–6th place match
4	Mexico	3	0	0	3	0	5	−5	0	7th–8th place match

Source: Paralympic.org
9 September 2016
20:00

Argentina	2–0	Mexico
Espinillo 2'; Velo 15'	Report

Olympic Tennis Centre, Rio de Janeiro
Attendance: 3,065
Referee: Germi Guimaraes (Brazil)

11 September 2016
20:00

China	2–0	Mexico
Wei 4'; Wang Y. 9'	Report

Olympic Tennis Centre, Rio de Janeiro
Attendance: 3,099
Referee: Germi Guimaraes (Brazil)

13 September 2016
20:00

Mexico	0–1	Spain
	Report	Acosta 14'

Olympic Tennis Centre, Rio de Janeiro
Attendance: 3,080
Referee: Rafael Glock (Brazil)

7th–8th place match

15 September 2016
09:00

Morocco	0–2	Mexico
	Report	Lanzagorta 42'; De la Cruz 49'

Olympic Tennis Centre, Rio de Janeiro
Attendance: 971
Referee: Christian Jung (Germany)

== Judo ==
With one pathway for qualification being having a top finish at the 2014 IBSA Judo World Championships, Mexico earned a qualifying spot in Rio base on the performance of Eduardo Avila Sanchez in the men's -81 kg event. The B3 Judoka finished first in his class.

== See also ==
- Mexico at the 2016 Summer Olympics
