= Dmytro Vynohradets =

Ukrainian Paralympic swimmer

Personal information
- Full name: Dmytro Vynohradets
- Nationality: Ukrainian
- Born: 25 May 1985 (age 41)

Sport
- Sport: Swimming
- Strokes: Freestyle, breaststroke, backstroke, butterfly
Medal record
Men's para swimming
Representing Ukraine
Event	1st	2nd	3rd
Paralympic Games	2	3	2
World Championships	15	3	3
European Championships	12	1	2
Total	29	7	7
Paralympic Games
Gold medal – first place	2008 Beijing	50 metre freestyle - S3
Gold medal – first place	2008 Beijing	200 metre freestyle - S3
Silver medal – second place	2008 Beijing	100 metre freestyle - S3
Silver medal – second place	2012 London	150 metre Individual Medley - SM3
Silver medal – second place	2012 London	50 metre backstroke - S3
Bronze medal – third place	2008 Beijing	50 metre backstroke - S3
Bronze medal – third place	2012 London	50 metre breaststroke - SB2
World Championships
Gold medal – first place	2010 Eindhoven	50m freestyle - S3
Gold medal – first place	2010 Eindhoven	100m freestyle - S3
Gold medal – first place	2010 Eindhoven	200m freestyle - S3
Gold medal – first place	2010 Eindhoven	150m medley - S3
Gold medal – first place	2013 Montreal	50m freestyle - S3
Gold medal – first place	2013 Montreal	100m freestyle - S3
Gold medal – first place	2013 Montreal	200m freestyle - S3
Gold medal – first place	2013 Montreal	150m medley - SM3
Gold medal – first place	2013 Montreal	50m backstroke - S3
Gold medal – first place	2013 Montreal	50m butterfly - S3
Gold medal – first place	2013 Montreal	4x50m medley relay 20pts
Gold medal – first place	2015 Glasgow	150m medley - S3
Gold medal – first place	2015 Glasgow	50m freestyle - S3
Gold medal – first place	2015 Glasgow	200m freestyle - S3
Gold medal – first place	2015 Glasgow	50m backstroke - S3
Silver medal – second place	2010 Eindhoven	4×50m freestyle - 20pts
Silver medal – second place	2013 Montreal	4x50m freestyle relay 20pts
Silver medal – second place	2015 Glasgow	mixed 4×50m freestyle relay
Bronze medal – third place	2010 Eindhoven	4×50m medley - 20pts
Bronze medal – third place	2010 Eindhoven	50m backstroke - S3
Bronze medal – third place	2013 Montreal	50m breaststroke - SB2
European Championships
Gold medal – first place	2009 Reykjavik	50 m freestyle S3
Gold medal – first place	2009 Reykjavik	50 m backstroke S3
Gold medal – first place	2009 Reykjavik	150 m ind. medley SM3
Gold medal – first place	2014 Eindhoven	50m freestyle S3
Gold medal – first place	2014 Eindhoven	100m freestyle S3
Gold medal – first place	2014 Eindhoven	200m freestyle S3
Gold medal – first place	2016 Funchal	50m freestyle S3
Gold medal – first place	2016 Funchal	200m freestyle S3
Gold medal – first place	2016 Funchal	50 m breaststroke – SB2
Gold medal – first place	2016 Funchal	150 m ind. medley SM3
Gold medal – first place	2016 Funchal	Mixed 50m freestyle relay 20pts
Gold medal – first place	2016 Funchal	Mixed 50m medley relay 20pts
Silver medal – second place	2009 Reykjavik	50 m butterfly S4
Bronze medal – third place	2026 Kocaeli	50 m freestyle S4
Bronze medal – third place	2026 Kocaeli	100 m freestyle S4

Dmytro Vynohradets (born 25 May 1985) is a Paralympic swimmer from Ukraine. He competes in S3, SB2 (breaststroke) and SM3 (individual medley) events.

== Career history ==
Vynohradets competed in the 2008 Summer Paralympics in Beijing. He won gold in both 50m and 200m freestyle with world record times. In the 100m freestyle he finished second to Jianping Du who also set a new world record, Dmytro also finished third behind Jianpung who again broke the world record in the 50m backstroke.

As of February 2013, Vynohradets is IPC World Record holder in S3 50m and 100m freestyle events.
