= Swimming at the 2016 Summer Paralympics – Men's 100 metre freestyle S7 =

Men's 100 metre freestyle S7 at the XV Paralympic Games
- Venue: Olympic Aquatics Stadium
- Dates: 16 September 2016
- Competitors: 16 from 11 nations

Medalists
1st place, gold medalist(s)		Shiyun Pan	China
2nd place, silver medalist(s)		Carlos Serrano Zárate	Colombia
3rd place, bronze medalist(s)		Ievgenii Bogodaiko	Ukraine

The Men's 100 metre freestyle S7 event at the 2016 Paralympic Games took place on 16 September 2016, at the Olympic Aquatics Stadium. Two heats were held. The swimmers with the eight fastest times advanced to the final.

== Heats ==
=== Heat 1 ===
9:30 16 September 2016:

Rank	Lane	Name	Nationality	Time	Notes
1	5	Jonathan Fox	Great Britain	1:03.17	Q
2	3	Michael Jones	Great Britain	1:06.06	Q
3	6	Marian Kvasnytsia	Ukraine	1:06.76	Q
4	4	Ievgenii Bogodaiko	Ukraine	1:07.36	Q
5	1	Hannes Schuermann	Germany	1:10.09	
6	7	Jean-Michel Lavalliere	Canada	1:10.27	
7	2	Italo Pereira	Brazil	1:10.97	
8	8	Jesus David de Marchena Acevedo	Aruba	2:17.84	

=== Heat 2 ===
9:33 16 September 2016:

Rank	Lane	Name	Nationality	Time	Notes
1	3	Carlos Serrano Zárate	Colombia	1:03.80	Q
2	4	Shiyun Pan	China	1:04.51	Q
3	5	Matthew Levy	Australia	1:04.90	Q
4	6	Tobias Pollap	Germany	1:05.73	Q
5	2	Jingang Wang	China	1:07.40	
6	7	Valerio Taras	Italy	1:08.64	
7	1	Andriy Kozlenko	Ukraine	1:11.24	
8	8	Facundo Jose Arregui	Argentina	1:11.74	

== Final ==
17:30 16 September 2016:

Rank	Lane	Name	Nationality	Time	Notes
1st place, gold medalist(s)	3	Shiyun Pan	China	1:00.82	
2nd place, silver medalist(s)	5	Carlos Serrano Zárate	Colombia	1:01.84	
3rd place, bronze medalist(s)	8	Ievgenii Bogodaiko	Ukraine	1:02.12	
4	6	Matthew Levy	Australia	1:02.28	
5	4	Jonathan Fox	Great Britain	1:03.91	
6	7	Michael Jones	Great Britain	1:04.69	
7	2	Tobias Pollap	Germany	1:04.76	
8	1	Marian Kvasnytsia	Ukraine	1:06.76	
