= Ukraine at the 2012 Summer Paralympics =

- IPC code: UKR
- NPC: National Sports Committee for the Disabled of Ukraine
- Website: www.paralympic.org.ua

in London
- Competitors: 148 in 12 sports
- Medals Ranked 4th: Gold 32 Silver 24 Bronze 28 Total 84

Summer Paralympics appearances (overview)
- 1996; 2000; 2004; 2008; 2012; 2016; 2020; 2024

Other related appearances
- Soviet Union (1988); Unified Team (1992)

Ukraine competed at the 2012 Summer Paralympics in London, United Kingdom, from 29 August to 9 September 2012.

== Medallists ==
Medal	Name	Sport	Event	Date
1st place, gold medalist(s)	Iurii Tsaruk	Athletics	Men's 100 metres T35	1 September
1st place, gold medalist(s)	Iurii Tsaruk	Athletics	Men's 200 metres T35	6 September
1st place, gold medalist(s)	Roman Pavlyk	Athletics	Men's 200 metres T36	6 September
1st place, gold medalist(s)	Ruslan Katyshev	Athletics	Men's long jump F11	4 September
1st place, gold medalist(s)	Roman Pavlyk	Athletics	Men's long jump F36	5 September
1st place, gold medalist(s)	Andrii Holivets	Athletics	Men's shot put F11/12	3 September
1st place, gold medalist(s)	Oksana Zubkovska	Athletics	Women's long jump F11/12	7 September
1st place, gold medalist(s)	Mariia Pomazan	Athletics	Women's shot put F35/36	2 September
1st place, gold medalist(s)	Yegor Dementyev	Cycling	Men's road race C4-5	6 September
1st place, gold medalist(s)	Yegor Dementyev	Cycling	Men's road time trial C5	5 September
1st place, gold medalist(s)	Davyd Khorava	Judo	Men's -66kg	30 August
1st place, gold medalist(s)	Dmytro Solovey	Judo	Men's -73kg	31 August
1st place, gold medalist(s)	Olexandr Kosinov	Judo	Men's -81kg	31 August
1st place, gold medalist(s)	Alla Lysenko	Rowing	Women's single sculls	2 September
1st place, gold medalist(s)	Vasyl Kovalchuk	Shooting	Mixed 10 metre air rifle prone SH2	1 September
1st place, gold medalist(s)	Hennadii Boiko	Swimming	Men's 50 metre backstroke S1	6 September
1st place, gold medalist(s)	Dmytro Zalevskyi	Swimming	Men's 100 metre backstroke S11	2 September
1st place, gold medalist(s)	Viktor Smyrnov	Swimming	Men's 100 metre butterfly S11	6 September
1st place, gold medalist(s)	Eskender Mustafaiev	Swimming	Men's 50 metre freestyle S4	31 August
1st place, gold medalist(s)	Maksym Veraksa	Swimming	Men's 50 metre freestyle S12	7 September
1st place, gold medalist(s)	Maksym Veraksa	Swimming	Men's 100 metre freestyle S12	4 September
1st place, gold medalist(s)	Yevheniy Bohodayko	Swimming	Men's 100 metre breaststroke SB6	5 September
1st place, gold medalist(s)	Andriy Kalyna	Swimming	Men's 100 metre breaststroke SB8	1 September
1st place, gold medalist(s)	Oleksii Fedyna	Swimming	Men's 100 metre breaststroke SB13	8 September
1st place, gold medalist(s)	Yevheniy Bohodayko	Swimming	Men's 200 metre individual medley SM7	2 September
1st place, gold medalist(s)	Maksym Veraksa	Swimming	Men's 200 metre individual medley SM12	3 September
1st place, gold medalist(s)	Oksana Khrul	Swimming	Women's 50 metre butterfly S6	7 September
1st place, gold medalist(s)	Nataliia Prologaieva	Swimming	Women's 50 metre freestyle S5	30 August
1st place, gold medalist(s)	Nataliia Prologaieva	Swimming	Women's 100 metre breaststroke SB4	4 September
1st place, gold medalist(s)	Viktoriia Savtsova	Swimming	Women's 100 metre breaststroke SB6	5 September
1st place, gold medalist(s)	Khrystyna Yurchenko	Swimming	Women's 100 metre breaststroke SB9	8 September
1st place, gold medalist(s)	Nataliia Prologaieva	Swimming	Women's 200 metre individual medley SM5	31 August
2nd place, silver medalist(s)	Vasyl Lishchynskyi	Athletics	Men's discus throw F11	3 September
2nd place, silver medalist(s)	Oleksii Pashkov	Athletics	Men's discus throw F35-36	3 September
2nd place, silver medalist(s)	Oxana Boturchuk	Athletics	Women's 400 metres T12	4 September
2nd place, silver medalist(s)	Viktoriya Kravchenko	Athletics	Women's 400 metres T37	6 September
2nd place, silver medalist(s)	Mariia Pomazan	Athletics	Women's discus throw F35/36	31 August
2nd place, silver medalist(s)	Inna Stryzhak	Athletics	Women's long jump F37/38	31 August
2nd place, silver medalist(s)	Anastasiia Mysnyk	Athletics	Women's shot put F20	5 September
2nd place, silver medalist(s)	7-a-side football team	Football 7-a-side	Football 7-a-side	9 September
2nd place, silver medalist(s)	Dmytro Vynohradets	Swimming	Men's 50 metre backstroke S3	8 September
2nd place, silver medalist(s)	Yevheniy Bohodayko	Swimming	Men's 100 metre backstroke S7	30 August
2nd place, silver medalist(s)	Yevheniy Bohodayko	Swimming	Men's 50 metre butterfly S7	31 August
2nd place, silver medalist(s)	Danylo Chufarov	Swimming	Men's 400 metre freestyle S13	4 September
2nd place, silver medalist(s)	Dmytro Vynohradets	Swimming	Men's 150 metre individual medley SM3	2 September
2nd place, silver medalist(s)	Andriy Kalyna	Swimming	Men's 200 metre individual medley SM9	6 September
2nd place, silver medalist(s)	Viktor Smyrnov	Swimming	Men's 200 metre individual medley SM11	8 September
2nd place, silver medalist(s)	Ganna Ielisavetska	Swimming	Women's 50 metre backstroke S2	5 September
2nd place, silver medalist(s)	Kateryna Istomina	Swimming	Women's 100 metre butterfly S8	30 August
2nd place, silver medalist(s)	Olga Sviderska	Swimming	Women's 50 metre freestyle S3	7 September
2nd place, silver medalist(s)	Olga Sviderska	Swimming	Women's 100 metre freestyle S3	3 September
2nd place, silver medalist(s)	Nataliia Prologaieva	Swimming	Women's 100 metre freestyle S5	8 September
2nd place, silver medalist(s)	Oksana Khrul	Swimming	Women's 100 metre breaststroke SB7	1 September
2nd place, silver medalist(s)	Yana Berezhna	Swimming	Women's 100 metre breaststroke SB11	3 September
2nd place, silver medalist(s)	Antonina Khodzynska	Table tennis	Women's individual Class 6	3 September
2nd place, silver medalist(s)	Anton Datsko	Wheelchair fencing	Men's foil B	4 September
3rd place, bronze medalist(s)	Roman Pavlyk	Athletics	Men's 100 metres T36	2 September
3rd place, bronze medalist(s)	Roman Pavlyk	Athletics	Men's 400 metres T36	4 September
3rd place, bronze medalist(s)	Ruslan Katyshev	Athletics	Men's triple jump F11	6 September
3rd place, bronze medalist(s)	Oxana Boturchuk	Athletics	Women's 100 metres T12	4 September
3rd place, bronze medalist(s)	Inna Stryzhak	Athletics	Women's 100 metres T38	1 September
3rd place, bronze medalist(s)	Inna Stryzhak	Athletics	Women's 200 metres T38	6 September
3rd place, bronze medalist(s)	Svitlana Kudelya	Athletics	Women's shot put F20	5 September
3rd place, bronze medalist(s)	Yuliya Halinska	Judo	Women's -48kg	30 August
3rd place, bronze medalist(s)	Nataliya Nikolaychyk	Judo	Women's -52kg	30 August
3rd place, bronze medalist(s)	Lidiia Soloviova	Powerlifting	Women's -44kg	31 August
3rd place, bronze medalist(s)	Volodymyr Kozlov; Kateryna Morozova; Yelena Pukhayeva; Denys Sobol; Andrii Stelmakh	Rowing	Mixed coxed four	2 September
3rd place, bronze medalist(s)	Oleksandr Golovko	Swimming	Men's 50 metre backstroke S1	6 September
3rd place, bronze medalist(s)	Viktor Smyrnov	Swimming	Men's 100 metre backstroke S11	2 September
3rd place, bronze medalist(s)	Sergii Klippert	Swimming	Men's 100 metre backstroke S12	5 September
3rd place, bronze medalist(s)	Oleksii Fedyna	Swimming	Men's 50 metre freestyle S13	1 September
3rd place, bronze medalist(s)	Sergii Klippert	Swimming	Men's 400 metre freestyle S12	30 August
3rd place, bronze medalist(s)	Dmytro Vynohradets	Swimming	Men's 50 metre breaststroke SB2	30 August
3rd place, bronze medalist(s)	Oleksandr Mashchenko	Swimming	Men's 100 metre breaststroke SB11	3 September
3rd place, bronze medalist(s)	Maksym Veraksa	Swimming	Men's 100 metre breaststroke SB12	8 September
3rd place, bronze medalist(s)	Oleksandr Mashchenko	Swimming	Men's 200 metre individual medley SM11	8 September
3rd place, bronze medalist(s)	Danylo Chufarov	Swimming	Men's 200 metre individual medley SM13	7 September
3rd place, bronze medalist(s)	Iryna Sotska	Swimming	Women's 50 metre backstroke S2	5 September
3rd place, bronze medalist(s)	Ani Palian	Swimming	Women's 50 metre freestyle S7	4 September
3rd place, bronze medalist(s)	Yaryna Matlo	Swimming	Women's 100 metre breaststroke SB12	8 September
3rd place, bronze medalist(s)	Mykhaylo Popov	Table tennis	Men's individual Class 7	2 September
3rd place, bronze medalist(s)	Yuliya Klymenko	Table tennis	Women's individual Class 6	3 September
3rd place, bronze medalist(s)	Viktoriia Safonova	Table tennis	Women's individual Class 7	3 September
3rd place, bronze medalist(s)	Women's volleyball team	Volleyball	Volleyball	7 September

== Archery ==
=== Men ===
Athlete	Event	Ranking round		Round of 32	Round of 16	Quarterfinals	Semifinals	Finals	
Athlete	Event	Score	Seed	Opposition score	Opposition score	Opposition score	Opposition score	Opposition score	Rank
Pavlo Nazar	Men's individual compound open	623	26	Bartos (CZE); L 1-7	did not advance				
Roman Chayka	Men's individual recurve standing	557	23	Li Z (CHN); W 6-4	Lasvenes (FRA); W 7-3	Tuchinov (RUS); L 0-6	did not advance		
Yuriy Kopiy	Men's individual recurve standing	602	13	Yang C J (TPE); W 6-5	Dong Z (CHN); W 6-5	Oyun (RUS); L 2-6	did not advance		
Taras Chopyk	Men's individual recurve W1/W2	561	18	Bartoli (ITA); W 7-3	Ranjbarkivaj (IRI); L 1-7	did not advance			
Roman Chayka; Taras Chopyk; Yuriy Kopiy	Men's team recurve	1720	9	—	Chinese Taipei (TPE); L 183–194	did not advance			

=== Women ===
Athlete	Event	Ranking round		Round of 32	Round of 16	Quarterfinals	Semifinals	Finals	
Athlete	Event	Score	Seed	Opposition score	Opposition score	Opposition score	Opposition score	Opposition score	Rank
Kseniya Markitantova	Women's individual compound	645	5	—	Su (TUR); L 4-6	did not advance			
Dzoba-Balian Roksolana	Women's individual recurve	552	4	Bye	Bayar (TUR); L 4-6	did not advance			
Iryna Volynets	Women's individual recurve	539	6	Bye	Li J (CHN); L 4-6	did not advance			

== Athletics ==
=== Men's track ===
Athlete	Events	Heat		Final	
Athlete	Events	Time	Rank	Time	Rank
Oleksandr Driha	800m T37	—		2:06.17	5
Oleksandr Driha	1500m T37	—		4:27.48 PB	9
Andriy Goliney	1500m T20	—		4:00.21 PB	4
Andriy Onufriyenko	200m T38	24.17 SB	10	did not advance	
Roman Pavlyk	100m T36	12.50	5 Q	12.26 =PB	3rd place, bronze medalist(s)
Roman Pavlyk	200m T36	—		24.70 RR	1st place, gold medalist(s)
Roman Pavlyk	400m T36	—		55.18 PB	3rd place, bronze medalist(s)
Mykyta Senyk	100m T38	—		11.83	7
Mykyta Senyk	200m T38	24.22	11	did not advance	
Viktor Shcherbyna	1500m T20	—		4:04.77	7
Iurii Tsaruk	100m T35	12.72 RR	1 Q	12.62 RR	1st place, gold medalist(s)
Iurii Tsaruk	200m T35	26.58 WR	1 Q	25.86 WR	1st place, gold medalist(s)

=== Men's field ===
Athlete	Events	Mark (m)	Points	Rank
Oleksandr Doroshenko	Discus throw F37-38	44.58	968	7
Oleksandr Doroshenko	Shot put F37-38	15.02	–	4
Andrii Holivets	Shot put F11–12	16.25 RR	991	1st place, gold medalist(s)
Dmytro Ibragimov	Shot put F46	14.97	–	4
Ruslan Katyshev	Long jump F11	6.46 PB	–	1st place, gold medalist(s)
Ruslan Katyshev	Triple jump F11	12.50 PB	–	3rd place, bronze medalist(s)
Ivan Kytsenko	Triple jump F13	NMR		
Vasyl Lishchynskyi	Discus throw F11	35.66	–	2nd place, silver medalist(s)
Vasyl Lishchynskyi	Shot put F11–12	13.09	945	4
Sergii Mykhailov	Triple jump F13	12.96	–	9
Andriy Onufriyenko	Long jump F37-38	6.09	978	6
Oleksii Pashkov	Discus throw F35-36	37.89 PB	–	2nd place, silver medalist(s)
Roman Pavlyk	Long jump F36	5.23 PB	–	1st place, gold medalist(s)
Mykola Zhabnyak	Discus throw F37-38	39.30	842	13
Mykola Zhabnyak	Shot put F37-38	13.08	–	10
Volodymyr Zhaivoronok	Discus throw F35-36	37.34	–	5

=== Women's track ===
Athlete	Events	Heat		Semifinal		Final	
Athlete	Events	Time	Rank	Time	Rank	Time	Rank
Oxana Boturchuk	100 m T12	12.24 WR	1 Q	12.34	3 q	12.18	3rd place, bronze medalist(s)
Oxana Boturchuk	200m T12	25.20 PB	4 Q	—		24.92 PB	4
Oxana Boturchuk	400m T12	57.30 SB	2 Q	55.93 PB	2 Q	55.69 PB	2nd place, silver medalist(s)
Olena Gliebova	100m T13	12.63	3 Q	—		12.64	5
Olena Gliebova	400m T13	—				58.44 PB	5
Viktoriya Kravchenko	100m T37	14.58	6 Q	—		14.48	8
Viktoriya Kravchenko	200m T37	30.33	7 Q	—		30.09	6
Viktoriya Kravchenko	400m T37	1:09.66 =SB	4 Q	—		1:07.32 RR	2nd place, silver medalist(s)
Oksana Krechunyak	100m T37	14.40 PB	3 Q	—		14.37 PB	5
Oksana Krechunyak	200m T37	30.02	6 Q	—		29.89	4
Maryna Snisar	200m T37	30.56	8 q	—		30.76	8
Maryna Snisar	400m T37	1:08.84	2 Q	—		1:08.86	4
Inna Stryzhak	100m T38	13.68 SB	1 Q	—		13.64 SB	3rd place, bronze medalist(s)
Inna Stryzhak	200m T38	28.91	3 Q	—		28.18 PB	3rd place, bronze medalist(s)

=== Women's field ===
Athlete	Events	Mark (m)	Points	Rank
Orysia Ilchyna	Discus throw F11–12	35.29	814	7
Orysia Ilchyna	Shot put F11–12	11.76	928	9
Iulia Korunchak	Long jump F13	5.13	–	4
Svitlana Kudelya	Shot put F20	12.24	–	3rd place, bronze medalist(s)
Alla Malchyk	Discus throw F35-36	21.63	811	8
Alla Malchyk	Shot put F35-36	9.09	923	5
Anastasiia Mysnyk	Shot put F20	12.67	–	2nd place, silver medalist(s)
Mariia Pomazan	Discus throw F35-36	30.12	1028	2nd place, silver medalist(s)
Mariia Pomazan	Shot put F35-36	12.22 WR	1062	1st place, gold medalist(s)
Inna Stryzhak	Long jump F37-38	4.79	1004	2nd place, silver medalist(s)
Viktoriya Yasevych	Discus throw F37	29.79	–	4
Viktoriya Yasevych	Shot put F37	9.93	–	6
Oksana Zubkovska	Long jump F11–12	6.60 WR	1065	1st place, gold medalist(s)

== Cycling ==
=== Men's road ===
Athlete	Event	Time	Rank
Yegor Dementyev	Men's road race C4-5	1:55:38	1st place, gold medalist(s)
Yegor Dementyev	Men's road time trial C5	32:12.98	1st place, gold medalist(s)

=== Men's track ===
Athlete	Event	Qualification		1st round		Final	
Athlete	Event	Time	Rank	Time	Rank	Opposition Time	Rank
Yegor Dementyev	Men's 1km time trial C4-5	—				1:09.558	8
Yegor Dementyev	Men's individual pursuit C5	4:43.881	4 q	—		Liu Xy (CHN); L 4:43.683	4

== Football 7-a-side ==
=== Group play ===
Pos	Team	Pld	W	D	L	GF	GA	GD	Pts	Qualification
1	Ukraine (UKR)	3	2	1	0	17	2	+15	7	Qualified for the medal round
2	Brazil (BRA)	3	2	1	0	12	1	+11	7	Qualified for the medal round
3	Great Britain (GBR)	3	1	0	2	5	10	−5	3	Qualified for the classification round
4	United States (USA)	3	0	0	3	0	21	−21	0	Qualified for the classification round

2012-09-01
14:00

Ukraine	9–0	United States
Shkvarlo 1', 7', 41'; Trushev 10'; Shevchyk 16', 30', 39', 48'; Dutko 32'	Report

Riverbank Arena
Attendance: 11,780
Referee: Hayley Ives (GBR)

2012-09-03
11:15

Ukraine	7–1	Great Britain
Antoniuk 1', 47'; Shevchyk 9', 10'; Devlysh 15', 54'; Ponomaryov 58'	Report	Diallo 41'

Riverbank Arena
Attendance: 9,329
Referee: Álvaro Azeredo (BRA)

2012-09-05
14:00

Brazil	1–1	Ukraine
Dos Santos Ribeiro 9'	Report	Dotsenko 35'

Riverbank Arena
Attendance: 9,994
Referee: Tom Nield (GBR)

=== Semi-final ===
2012-09-07
17:30

Ukraine	2–1	Iran
Dotsenko 37'; Shkvarlo 57'	Report	Bakhshi 51'

Riverbank Arena
Attendance: 2,900
Referee: Stephen Conroy (GBR)

=== Final ===
2012-09-09
16:00

Russia	1–0	Ukraine
Ramonov 44'	Report

Riverbank Arena
Attendance: 13,360
Referee: Keith Stroud (GBR)

== Judo ==
=== Men ===
Athlete	Event	Preliminary	Quarterfinals	Semifinals	Repechage Round 1	Repechage Round 2	Final/ Bronze medal contest
Athlete	Event	Opposition Result	Opposition Result	Opposition Result	Opposition Result	Opposition Result	Opposition Result
Davyd Khorava	Men's 66kg	—	Kallunki (FIN); W/O	Garcia del Valle (ESP); W 0100-0000	—		Zhao X (CHN); W 0100-0000 (gold)
Dmytro Solovey	Men's 73kg	Ali Shanani (IRI); W 0101-0000	Powell (GBR); W 0101-0000	Ávila Sanchez (MEX); W 1023-0102	—		Khalilov (UZB); W 0100-0000 (gold)
Olexandr Kosinov	Men's 81kg	Bye	Cruz Alonso (CUB); W 0102-0002	Krieger (GER); W 0212-0013	—		Effron (ARG); W 0122-0112 (gold)
Oleksandr Pominov	Men's 90kg	H Marcillis (CUB); L 0001-0101	—		Dashtseren (MGL); L 0001-0110	did not advance	

=== Women ===
Athlete	Event	Preliminary	Quarterfinals	Semifinals	Repechage	Final/ Bronze medal contest
Athlete	Event	Opposition Result	Opposition Result	Opposition Result	Opposition Result	Opposition Result
Yuliya Halinska	Women's 48kg	—	Garcia Benitez (ESP); W 0101–0000	C Brussig (GER); L 0002-0021	—	Huang X (CHN); W 0100-0000 (bronze)
Nataliya Nikolaychyk	Women's 52kg	—	Martinet (FRA); L 0000-0011	—	Hangai (JPN); W 0100-0000	Stepaniuk (RUS); W 0101-0000 (bronze)

== Powerlifting ==
=== Men ===
Athlete	Event	Result	Rank
Anton Kriukov	100kg	205.0	7
Anatolii Mykoliuk	48kg	NMR	

=== Women ===
Athlete	Event	Result	Rank
Maryna Kopiika	40kg	73.0	7
Tetyana Shyrokolava	52kg	NMR	
Lidiia Soloviova	44kg	100.0	3rd place, bronze medalist(s)
Rayisa Toporkova	48kg	95.0	6

== Rowing ==
Athlete	Event	Heats		Repechage		Final	
Athlete	Event	Time	Rank	Time	Rank	Time	Rank
Andrii Kryvchun	Men's singles sculls	5:06.16	6 R	5:07.22	4 FB	5:11.92	4
Alla Lysenko	Women's single sculls	5:29.99	1 Q	—		5:35.29	1st place, gold medalist(s)
Dmytro Ivanov; Iryna Kyrychenko	Mixed double sculls	4:07.30	4 R	4:07.99	3 FB	4:09.69	1
Volodymyr Kozlov; Kateryna Morozova; Yelena Pukhayeva; Denys Sobol; Andrii Stelmakh	Mixed coxed four	3:20.98	3 R	3:23.53	1 FA	3:23.22	3rd place, bronze medalist(s)

== Shooting ==
=== Men ===
Athlete	Event	Qualification		Final		
Athlete	Event	Score	Rank	Score	Total	Rank
Andrii Doroshenko	Men's 10m air rifle standing SH1	578	20	did not advance		
Andrii Doroshenko	Men's 50m rifle 3 positions SH1	1122	14	did not advance		
Andrii Doroshenko	Mixed 50m rifle prone SH1	575	38	did not advance		
Vasyl Kovalchuk	Mixed 10m air rifle prone SH2	600	1 Q	106.4	706.4 PR	1st place, gold medalist(s)
Vasyl Kovalchuk	Mixed 10m air rifle standing SH2	598	11	did not advance		
Vadum Nesterenko	Men's 10m air pistol SH1	558	16	did not advance		
Vadum Nesterenko	Mixed 50m pistol SH1	513	21	did not advance		
Iurii Stoiev	Men's 10m air rifle standing SH1	591	6 Q	100.9	691.9	6
Iurii Stoiev	Men's 50m rifle 3 positions SH1	1103	21	did not advance		
Iurii Stoiev	Mixed 50m rifle prone SH1	575	39	did not advance		

=== Women ===
Athlete	Event	Qualification		Final		
Athlete	Event	Score	Rank	Score	Total	Rank
Olga Mustafeiva	Women's 10m air pistol SH1	368	7 Q	100.6	468.6	4
Anastasiia Skok	Women's 10m air pistol SH1	348	13	did not advance		

== Swimming ==
=== Men ===
Athletes	Event	Heat		Final	
Athletes	Event	Time	Rank	Time	Rank
Yevheniy Bohodayko	50m freestyle S7	28.88	4 Q	28.69	5
Yevheniy Bohodayko	100m freestyle S7	1:06.55	8 Q	1:03.96	6
Yevheniy Bohodayko	100m backstroke S7	1:12.79	2 Q	1:11.31	2nd place, silver medalist(s)
Yevheniy Bohodayko	50m butterfly S7	30.41	1 Q	30.19	2nd place, silver medalist(s)
Yevheniy Bohodayko	100m breaststroke SB6	1:23.86 PR	1 Q	1:20.17 WR	1st place, gold medalist(s)
Yevheniy Bohodayko	200m individual medley SM7	2:42.39	5 Q	2:33.13 WR	1st place, gold medalist(s)
Hennadii Boiko	50m backstroke S1	—		1:04.29 WR	1st place, gold medalist(s)
Danylo Chufarov	50m freestyle S13	25.15	9	did not advance	
Danylo Chufarov	100m freestyle S13	54.05	6 Q	53.64	5
Danylo Chufarov	400m freestyle S13	4:15.24	2 Q	4:05.85	2nd place, silver medalist(s)
Danylo Chufarov	100m backstroke S13	1:15.53	13	did not advance	
Danylo Chufarov	100m butterfly S13	59.92	7 Q	58.05	4
Danylo Chufarov	100m breaststroke SB13	1:15.12	8 Q	1:15.05	8
Danylo Chufarov	200m individual medley SM13	2:15.51	3 Q	2:10.22	3rd place, bronze medalist(s)
Oleksii Fedyna	50m freestyle S13	24.57	5 Q	24.09	3rd place, bronze medalist(s)
Oleksii Fedyna	100m freestyle S13	54.63	9	did not advance	
Oleksii Fedyna	100m backstroke S13	1:05.62	8 Q	1:04.77	6
Oleksii Fedyna	100m breaststroke SB13	1:05.12	1 Q	1:04.30 PR	1st place, gold medalist(s)
Oleksii Fedyna	200m individual medley SM13	2:17.96	6 Q	2:17.29	7
Anton Ganzha	400m freestyle S10	4:35.61	9	did not advance	
Anton Ganzha	100m backstroke S13	1:07.19	11	did not advance	
Anton Ganzha	200m individual medley SM13	2:27.68	10	did not advance	
Oleksandr Golovko	50m backstroke S1	—		1:32.44	3rd place, bronze medalist(s)
Maksym Isaiev	50m freestyle S10	26.76	19	did not advance	
Maksym Isaiev	400m freestyle S10	4:22.70	11	did not advance	
Maksym Isaiev	100m backstroke S10	1:03.92	9	did not advance	
Maksym Isaiev	100m butterfly S10	1:03.10	16	did not advance	
Andriy Kalyna	50m freestyle S9	26.61	6 Q	26.49	6
Andriy Kalyna	100m freestyle S9	58.26	6 Q	57.59	7
Andriy Kalyna	100m backstroke S9	1:13.15	13	did not advance	
Andriy Kalyna	100m breaststroke SB8	1:08.27	1 Q	1:07.45	1st place, gold medalist(s)
Andriy Kalyna	200m individual medley SM9	2:20.38	2 Q	2:16.38	2nd place, silver medalist(s)
Sergii Klippert	50m freestyle S12	25.58	9	did not advance	
Sergii Klippert	100m freestyle S12	56.10	8 Q	55.50	7
Sergii Klippert	400m freestyle S12	4:30.68	5 Q	4:17.12	3rd place, bronze medalist(s)
Sergii Klippert	100m backstroke S12	1:02.59	3 Q	1:01.55	3rd place, bronze medalist(s)
Sergii Klippert	100m butterfly S12	1:04.29	12	did not advance	
Sergii Klippert	100m breaststroke SB12	1:12.93; Swim off 1:10.56	8 Q	1:10.75	4
Sergii Klippert	200m individual medley	2:16.35	4 Q	2:15.30	4
Oleksandr Komarov	50m freestyle S7	30.79	9	did not advance	
Oleksandr Komarov	100m freestyle S7	1:05.83	6 Q	1:05.60	7
Oleksandr Komarov	400m freestyle S7	5:14.14	10	did not advance	
Oleksandr Komarov	200m individual medley SM7	2:54.14	10	did not advance	
Dmytro Kryzhanovskyy	50m freestyle S5	34.85	4 Q	34.97	4
Dmytro Kryzhanovskyy	100m freestyle S5	1:21.61	5 Q	1:16.88	4
Marian Kvasnytsia	100m freestyle S7	1:09.04	10	did not advance	
Marian Kvasnytsia	400m freestyle S7	5:05.50	8 Q	5:04.92	8
Marian Kvasnytsia	100m backstroke S7	1:14.63	7 Q	DSQ	
Iurii Martynov	50m freestyle S9	27.90	14	did not advance	
Iurii Martynov	100m freestyle S9	1:02.40	19	did not advance	
Iurii Martynov	100m butterfly S9	1:08.81	16	did not advance	
Iurii Martynov	100m breaststroke SB9	1:12.43	9	did not advance	
Iurii Martynov	200m individual medley SM9	2:25.68	8 Q	2:26.65	8
Oleksandr Mashchenko	50m freestyle S11	28.47	13	did not advance	
Oleksandr Mashchenko	100m freestyle S11	1:03.62	11	did not advance	
Oleksandr Mashchenko	100m backstroke S11	1:12.35	6 Q	1:12.94	7
Oleksandr Mashchenko	100m butterfly S11	1:05.68	3 Q	1:05.76	5
Oleksandr Mashchenko	100m breaststroke SB11	1:16.27	3 Q	1:14.43	3rd place, bronze medalist(s)
Eskender Mustafaiev	50m freestyle S4	38.77	1 Q	38.26	1st place, gold medalist(s)
Eskender Mustafaiev	100m freestyle S4	1:27.44	5 Q	1:25.82	4
Eskender Mustafaiev	200m freestyle S4	3:26.92	8 Q	3:21.12	8
Eskender Mustafaiev	50m backstroke S4	51.92	8 Q	52.51	8
Ievgen Panibratets	50m freestyle S2	1:08.45	6 Q	1:08.75	7
Ievgen Panibratets	100m freestyle S2	2:38.48	11	did not advance	
Ievgen Panibratets	50m backstroke S2	1:07.33	4 Q	1:11.03	8
Ievgen Poltavskyi	50m freestyle S7	32.07	12	did not advance	
Ievgen Poltavskyi	100m backstroke S7	1:14.52	6 Q	1:14.03	4
Ievgen Poltavskyi	50m butterfly S7	35.01	9	did not advance	
Iaroslav Sememenko	50m freestyle S6	33.53	11	did not advance	
Iaroslav Sememenko	100m backstroke S6	1:18.24	3 Q	1:15.98	4
Iaroslav Sememenko	50m butterfly S6	33.84	7 Q	33.47	6
Iaroslav Sememenko	100m breaststroke SB7	1:26.34	6 Q	1:26.76	8
Iaroslav Sememenko	200m individual medley SM6	2:50.38	3 Q	2:48.11	4
Andriy Sirovatchenko	50m freestyle S9	26.99	9	did not advance	
Andriy Sirovatchenko	100m freestyle S9	59.76	14	did not advance	
Andriy Sirovatchenko	100m butterfly S9	1:02.60	8 Q	1:03.63	8
Viktor Smyrnov	50m freestyle S11	27.55	6 Q	27.03	6
Viktor Smyrnov	100m freestyle S11	1:03.26	10	did not advance	
Viktor Smyrnov	400m freestyle S11	5:01.89	7 Q	5:01.06	8
Viktor Smyrnov	100m backstroke S11	1:10.81	3 Q	1:08.22	3rd place, bronze medalist(s)
Viktor Smyrnov	100m butterfly S11	1:05.76	4 Q	1:03.32	1st place, gold medalist(s)
Viktor Smyrnov	100m breaststroke SB11	1:17.78	5 Q	1:14.75	4
Anton Stabrovskyy	400m freestyle S12	4:38.94	9	did not advance	
Anton Stabrovskyy	100m backstroke S12	1:07.30	9	did not advance	
Anton Stabrovskyy	100m butterfly S12	1:00.62	5 Q	1:00.17	5
Oleg Tkalienko	50m freestyle S12	27.40	15	did not advance	
Oleg Tkalienko	100m freestyle S12	1:01.24	14	did not advance	
Oleg Tkalienko	400m freestyle S12	4:57.67	11	did not advance	
Oleg Tkalienko	100m butterfly S12	1:06.56	13	did not advance	
Oleg Tkalienko	100m breaststroke SB12	1:12.45	6 Q	1:11.00	5
Oleg Tkalienko	200m individual medley SM12	2:30.65	10	did not advance	
Maksym Veraksa	50m freestyle S12	23.80	1 Q	23.60	1st place, gold medalist(s)
Maksym Veraksa	100m freestyle S12	52.63	1 Q	51.40 PR	1st place, gold medalist(s)
Maksym Veraksa	100m backstroke S12	1:02.63	4 Q	1:01.82	4
Maksym Veraksa	100m breaststroke SB12	1:10.10	3 Q	1:07.79	3rd place, bronze medalist(s)
Maksym Veraksa	200m individual medley	2:14.91	1 Q	2:12.42 PR	1st place, gold medalist(s)
Dmytro Vynohradets	50m backstroke S3	48.02	2 Q	46.26	2nd place, silver medalist(s)
Dmytro Zalevskyi	50m freestyle S11	29.37	14	did not advance	
Dmytro Zalevskyi	100m freestyle S11	1:06.29	13	did not advance	
Dmytro Zalevskyi	400m freestyle S11	5:00.57	6 Q	4:53.46	5
Dmytro Zalevskyi	100m backstroke S11	1:11.25	4 Q	1:07.81	1st place, gold medalist(s)
Dmytro Zalevskyi	100m breaststroke SB11	1:25.53	12	did not advance	
Maksym Zavodnyy	50m freestyle S13	26.35	14	did not advance	
Maksym Zavodnyy	100m freestyle S13	1:02.21	15	did not advance	
Maksym Zavodnyy	100m breaststroke SB13	1:09.31	5 Q	1:08.05	5
Denys Zhumela	100m freestyle S2	2:33.86	9	did not advance	
Denys Zhumela	200m freestyle S2	—		5:26.76	7
Andriy Kalyna; Oleksandr Komarov; Iurii Martynov; Andriy Sirovatchenko	4x100m freestyle relay	4:03.63	7 Q	3:59.17	7
Maksym Isaiev; Iurii Martynov; Iaroslav Sememeneko; Andriy Sirovatchenko	4x100m medley relay	4:25.52	5 Q	4:15.48	4

=== Women ===
Athletes	Event	Heat		Final	
Athletes	Event	Time	Rank	Time	Rank
Iryna Balashova	50m freestyle S13	28.87	4 Q	28.66	4
Iryna Balashova	100m freestyle S13	1:03.90	5 Q	1:04.26	6
Iryna Balashova	100m breaststroke SB13	1:25.66	8 Q	1:21.66	4
Iryna Balashova	200m individual medley SM13	2:44.03	8 Q	2:41.45	8
Yana Berezhna	50m freestyle S11	39.00	20	did not advance	
Yana Berezhna	100m freestyle S11	1:23.92	16	did not advance	
Yana Berezhna	100m breaststroke SB11	1:32.78	3 Q	1:29.99	2nd place, silver medalist(s)
Yana Berezhna	200m individual medley SM11	3:13.10	9	did not advance	
Olena Fedota	50m freestyle S6	37.34	5 Q	37.15	7
Olena Fedota	100m freestyle S6	1:21.92	6 Q	1:19.97	6
Olena Fedota	50m butterfly S6	40.71	7 Q	39.74	4
Olga Iakibiuk	50m freestyle S11	37.19	18	did not advance	
Olga Iakibiuk	100m freestyle S11	1:19.28	11	did not advance	
Olga Iakibiuk	200m individual medley SM11	3:15.53	12	did not advance	
Ganna Ielisavetska	100m freestyle S3	2:37.85	10	did not advance	
Ganna Ielisavetska	50m backstroke S2	—		1:04.14	2nd place, silver medalist(s)
Kateryna Istomina	50m freestyle S8	32.39	7 Q	32.05	7
Kateryna Istomina	100m freestyle S8	1:11.95	7 Q	1:12.43	8
Kateryna Istomina	100m backstroke S8	1:26.78	10	did not advance	
Kateryna Istomina	100m butterfly S8	1:11.04 PR	1 Q	1:11.53	2nd place, silver medalist(s)
Oksana Khrul	50m freestyle S6	37.46	7 Q	36.77	5
Oksana Khrul	100m backstroke S6	1:31.71	4 Q	1:29.95	4
Oksana Khrul	50m butterfly S6	36.96 WR	1 Q	36.05 WR	1st place, gold medalist(s)
Oksana Khrul	100m breaststroke SB7	1:37.12	2 Q	1:35.68	2nd place, silver medalist(s)
Oksana Khrul	200m individual medley SM6	3:22.13	5 Q	3:17.10	4
Daria Kopaieva	50m backstroke S2	—		1:14.32	4
Yaryna Matlo	50m freestyle S12	30.68	9	did not advance	
Yaryna Matlo	100m backstroke S12	1:16.61	5 Q	1:13.74	5
Yaryna Matlo	100m butterfly S12	—		1:17.49	8
Yaryna Matlo	100m breaststroke SB12	1:24.98	7 Q	1:20.21	3rd place, bronze medalist(s)
Yaryna Matlo	200m individual medley SM12	2:42.91	7 Q	2:41.91	8
Ani Palian	50m freestyle S7	33.63	2 Q	33.30	3rd place, bronze medalist(s)
Ani Palian	100m freestyle S7	1:14.16	4 Q	1:13.67	4
Ani Palian	400m freestyle S7	5:23.49	3 Q	5:21.73	4
Ani Palian	50m butterfly S7	39.37	5 Q	38.71	5
Maryna Piddubna	50m freestyle S11	35.86	13	did not advance	
Maryna Piddubna	100m freestyle S11	1:18.53	9	did not advance	
Maryna Piddubna	100m backstroke S11	1:26.87	7 Q	1:24.32	5
Maryna Piddubna	200m individual medley	3:04.93	6 Q	3:06.29	4
Nataliia Prologaieva	50m freestyle S5	36.43	1 Q	35.88 =WR	1st place, gold medalist(s)
Nataliia Prologaieva	100m freestyle S5	1:20.62	1 Q	1:20.57	2nd place, silver medalist(s)
Nataliia Prologaieva	100m breaststroke SB4	1:44.90 WR	1 Q	1:43.99 WR	1st place, gold medalist(s)
Nataliia Prologaieva	200m individual medley SM5	3:15.50 WR	1 Q	3:13.43 WR	1st place, gold medalist(s)
Viktoriia Savtsova	50m freestyle S5	39.12	4 Q	38.50	5
Viktoriia Savtsova	100m freestyle S5	1:26.90	6 Q	1:26.82	6
Viktoriia Savtsova	100m breaststroke SB6	1:41.22	3 Q	1:39.13 PR	1st place, gold medalist(s)
Maryna Shtal	50m freestyle S12	31.35	12	did not advance	
Maryna Shtal	100m freestyle S12	1:08.51	10	did not advance	
Maryna Shtal	100m backstroke S12	1:23.90	8 Q	1:22.11	8
Maryna Shtal	100m breaststroke SB12	1:23.55	3 Q	1:23.11	5
Maryna Shtal	200m individual medley	2:52.56	9	did not advance	
Iryna Sotska	100m freestyle S3	2:30.85	8 Q	2:35.66	8
Iryna Sotska	50m backstroke S2	—		1:05.16	3rd place, bronze medalist(s)
Olga Sviderska	50m freestyle S3	48.64	1 Q	48.39	2nd place, silver medalist(s)
Olga Sviderska	100m freestyle S3	1:45.34 WR	1 Q	1:52.91	2nd place, silver medalist(s)
Olga Sviderska	50m backstroke S4	59.82	5 Q	58.20	5
Mariya Timofeyeva	100m breaststroke SB9	1:20.45	4 Q	1:20.92	5
Yuliya Volkova	50m freestyle S12	30.31	8 Q	29.99	8
Yuliya Volkova	100m freestyle S12	1:05.50	7 Q	1:05.40	7
Yuliya Volkova	400m freestyle S12	5:06.66	8 Q	5:00.18	8
Yuliya Volkova	100m breaststroke SB12	1:27.40	8 Q	1:26.06	8
Khrystyna Yurchenko	100m breaststroke SB9	1:18.61	1 Q	1:17.81	1st place, gold medalist(s)

== Table tennis ==
=== Men ===
Athlete	Event	Preliminaries			Quarterfinals	Semifinals	Final / BM	
Athlete	Event	Opposition Result	Opposition Result	Rank	Opposition Result	Opposition Result	Opposition Result	Rank
Maxym Nikolenko	Individual C7	Despineux (BEL); W 3–0	Dettoni (CHI); W 3–0	1 Q	Messi (FRA); W 3–0	Bayley (GBR); L 1-3	Popov (UKR); L 2-3	4
Mykhaylo Popov	Individual C7	Karabardak (GBR); W 3–0	Kim YS (KOR); W 3–0	1 Q	Bye	Wollmert (GER); L 2-3	Nikolenko (UKR); W 3-2	3rd place, bronze medalist(s)
Vadym Kubov	Individual C9	Bouvais (FRA); L 2-3	Zhi (MAS); W 3–1	2	did not advance			
Yuriy Shchepanskyy	Individual C9	Bye			Cabestany (FRA); L 1-3	did not advance		

=== Women ===
Athlete	Event	Preliminaries				Semifinals	Final / BM	
Athlete	Event	Opposition Result	Opposition Result	Opposition Result	Rank	Opposition Result	Opposition Result	Rank
Antonina Khodzynska	Individual C6	Chebanika (RUS); W 3–1	Jang EB (KOR); W 3–0	Marszal (POL); W 3–1	1 Q	Grebe (GER); W 3–0	Chebanika (RUS); L 0–3	2nd place, silver medalist(s)
Yuliya Klymenko	Individual C6	Grebe (GER); W 3–1	Eigner (POL); W 3–0	McDonnell (AUS); W 3–0	1 Q	Chebanika (RUS); L 2–3	Grebe (GER); W 3–1	3rd place, bronze medalist(s)
Viktoriia Safonova	Individual C7	Ovsyannikova (RUS); L 0–3	Schrijver (NED); W 3–1	Mahmoud (EGY); W 3–0	2 Q	van Zon (NED); L 2–3	Ocsoy (TUR); W 3–1	3rd place, bronze medalist(s)

=== Teams ===
Athlete	Event	First Round	Quarterfinals	Semifinals	Final / BM	
Athlete	Event	Opposition Result	Opposition Result	Opposition Result	Opposition Result	Rank
Maxym Nikolenko; Mykhaylo Popov	Men's team C6–8	Poland (POL); L 0–3	did not advance			
Vadym Kubov; Yuriy Shchepanskyy	Men's team C9–10	Bye	Malaysia (MAS); W 3–1	China (CHN); L 0–3	Spain (ESP); L 1–3	4
Antonina Khodzynska; Yuliya Klymenko; Viktoriia Safonova	Women's team C6–10	Egypt (EGY); W 3–1	China (CHN); L 0–3	did not advance		

== Volleyball ==
=== Women's tournament ===
Roster

The following is the Ukrainian roster in the women's volleyball tournament of the 2012 Summer Paralympics.

№	Name	Date of birth	Position	2012 club
1	Margaryta Pryvalykhina	9 March 1980		
2	Anzhelika Churkina	18 September 1969		
3	Larysa Sinchuk	9 August 1965		
4	Galyna Kuznetsova	22 January 1960		
5	Olena Manankova	18 May 1995		
6	Ilona Yudina	28 June 1984		
7	Larysa Klochkova	15 April 1970		
9	Inna Osetynska	1 January 1967		
10	Olga Shatylo	12 August 1984		
11	Larysa Ponomarenko	28 April 1977		
12	Valentyna Brik	31 August 1985		

Group play

Pos	Team	Pld	W	L	Pts	SW	SL	SR	SPW	SPL	SPR
1	Ukraine	3	3	0	6	9	1	9.000	241	167	1.443
2	Netherlands	3	2	1	5	7	4	1.750	251	201	1.249
3	Japan	3	1	2	4	4	6	0.667	190	218	0.872
4	Great Britain	3	0	3	3	0	9	0.000	129	225	0.573

31 August 2012; 9:00	Great Britain	0–3	Ukraine	ExCeL London, London; Attendance: Report; Referees: Adnan Kolos (BIH), Sari Mannersuo (FIN)
31 August 2012; 9:00	(9–25, 20–25, 14–25)			ExCeL London, London; Attendance: Report; Referees: Adnan Kolos (BIH), Sari Mannersuo (FIN)

2 September 2012; 11:00	Netherlands	1–3	Ukraine	ExCeL London, London; Referees: Jung Mal-Soon (KOR), Dimosthenis Kostopoulos (GRE)
2 September 2012; 11:00	(24–26, 25–15, 11–25, 19–25); Report			ExCeL London, London; Referees: Jung Mal-Soon (KOR), Dimosthenis Kostopoulos (GRE)

3 September 2012; 16:00	Ukraine	3–0	Japan	ExCeL London, London; Referees: Ronaldo Chaves (BRA), Joe Campbell (USA)
3 September 2012; 16:00	(25–20, 25–9, 25–16); Report			ExCeL London, London; Referees: Ronaldo Chaves (BRA), Joe Campbell (USA)

Semi-final

5 September 2012; 16:00	Ukraine	0–3	United States	ExCeL London, London; Referees: Dominik Raca (CRO), Stephen Giugni (AUS)
5 September 2012; 16:00	(14–25, 13–25, 19–25); Report			ExCeL London, London; Referees: Dominik Raca (CRO), Stephen Giugni (AUS)

Bronze medal match

7 September 2012; 19:00	Ukraine	3–0	Netherlands	ExCeL London, London; Referees: Joe Campbell (GBR), France Marcoux (CAN)
7 September 2012; 19:00	(25–14, 25–21, 25–16); Report			ExCeL London, London; Referees: Joe Campbell (GBR), France Marcoux (CAN)

== See also ==
- Ukraine at the Paralympics
- Ukraine at the 2012 Summer Olympics
