= Swimming at the 2016 Summer Paralympics – Men's 50 metre freestyle S7 =

Men's 50 metre freestyle S7 at the XV Paralympic Games
- Venue: Olympic Aquatics Stadium
- Dates: 9 September 2016
- Competitors: 14 from 11 nations

Medalists
1st place, gold medalist(s)		Shiyun Pan	China
2nd place, silver medalist(s)		Ievgenii Bogodaiko	Ukraine
3rd place, bronze medalist(s)		Carlos Serrano Zárate	Colombia

The Men's 50 metre freestyle S7 event at the 2016 Paralympic Games took place on 9 September 2016, at the Olympic Aquatics Stadium. Two heats were held. The swimmers with the eight fastest times advanced to the final.

== Heats ==
=== Heat 1 ===
9:42 9 September 2016:

Rank	Lane	Name	Nationality	Time	Notes
1	4	Matthew Levy	Australia	28.55	Q
2	3	Carlos Serrano Zárate	Colombia	28.87	Q
3	5	Tobias Pollap	Germany	30.23	Q
4	6	Michael Jones	Great Britain	30.67	Q
5	7	Jadhav Suyash Narayan	India	31.58	
6	2	Italo Pereira	Brazil	32.68	
	1	Jesus David de Marchena Acevedo	Aruba		DSQ

=== Heat 2 ===
9:45 9 September 2016:

Rank	Lane	Name	Nationality	Time	Notes
1	6	Jingang Wang	China	28.89	Q
2	4	Ievgenii Bogodaiko	Ukraine	29.24	Q
3	3	Jonathan Fox	Great Britain	29.77	Q
4	5	Shiyun Pan	China	29.81	Q
5	2	Jean-Michel Lavalliere	Canada	32.04	
6	7	Hannes Schuermann	Germany	32.93	
	1	Emmanuel Diaz	Honduras		DSQ

== Final ==
17:59 9 September 2016:

Rank	Lane	Name	Nationality	Time	Notes
1st place, gold medalist(s)	7	Shiyun Pan	China	27.35	WR
2nd place, silver medalist(s)	6	Ievgenii Bogodaiko	Ukraine	27.64	
3rd place, bronze medalist(s)	5	Carlos Serrano Zárate	Colombia	28.60	
4	4	Matthew Levy	Australia	28.68	
5	3	Jingang Wang	China	29.50	
6	2	Jonathan Fox	Great Britain	29.52	
7	8	Michael Jones	Great Britain	29.82	
8	1	Tobias Pollap	Germany	30.04	
