= Swimming at the 2016 Summer Paralympics – Men's 50 metre butterfly =

The men's 50 m butterfly swimming events for the 2016 Summer Paralympics took place at the Olympic Aquatics Stadium from 8 to 17 September. A total of eleven events were contested for different classifications.

== Competition format ==
Each event consisted of two rounds: heats and final. The top eight swimmers overall in the heats progressed to the final. If there were less than eight swimmers in an event, no heats were held and all swimmers qualify for the final.

== Results ==
=== S5 ===
17:56 10 September 2016:

Rank	Lane	Name	Nationality	Time	Notes
1st place, gold medalist(s)	5	Roy Perkins	United States	35.04	
2nd place, silver medalist(s)	4	Shiwei He	China	35.25	
3rd place, bronze medalist(s)	3	Daniel Dias	Brazil	35.62	
4	6	Andrew Mullen	Great Britain	36.32	
5	2	Beytullah Eroglu	Turkey	38.70	
6	1	Edgar Hugo Pineda Castro	Mexico	38.96	
7	7	Thanh Tung Vo	Vietnam	39.44	
8	8	Darko Duric	Slovenia	40.92	

=== S6 ===
18:11 9 September 2016:

Rank	Lane	Name	Nationality	Time	Notes
1st place, gold medalist(s)	6	Qing Xu	China	29.89	WR
2nd place, silver medalist(s)	5	Zheng Tao	China	29.93	
3rd place, bronze medalist(s)	4	Lichao Wang	China	30.95	
4	3	Nelson Crispín	Colombia	31.30	
5	7	Kyosuke Oyama	Japan	31.98	
6	2	Sascha Kindred	Great Britain	32.91	
7	8	Nathan Clement	Canada	33.13	
8	1	Talisson Glock	Brazil	33.14	

=== S7 ===
20:02 12 September 2016:

Rank	Lane	Name	Nationality	Time	Notes
1st place, gold medalist(s)	7	Shiyun Pan	China	28.41	WR
2nd place, silver medalist(s)	4	Ievgenii Bogodaiko	Ukraine	29.35	
3rd place, bronze medalist(s)	6	Jingang Wang	China	30.07	
4	2	Carlos Serrano Zárate	Colombia	31.07	
5	3	Matthew Levy	Australia	31.32	
6	5	Andriy Kozlenko	Ukraine	31.33	
7	8	Marian Kvasnytsia	Ukraine	32.37	
8	1	Tobias Pollap	Germany	32.91	
