= Swimming at the 2016 Summer Paralympics – Men's 50 metre butterfly S7 =

Men's 50 metre butterfly S7 at the XV Paralympic Games
- Venue: Olympic Aquatics Stadium
- Dates: 12 September 2016
- Competitors: 13 from 9 nations

Medalists
1st place, gold medalist(s)		Shiyun Pan	China
2nd place, silver medalist(s)		Ievgenii Bogodaiko	Ukraine
3rd place, bronze medalist(s)		Jingang Wang	China

The Men's 50 metre butterfly S7 event at the 2016 Paralympic Games took place on 12 September 2016, at the Olympic Aquatics Stadium. Two heats were held. The swimmers with the eight fastest times advanced to the final.

== Heats ==
=== Heat 1 ===
11:42 12 September 2016:

Rank	Lane	Name	Nationality	Time	Notes
1	4	Ievgenii Bogodaiko	Ukraine	30.74	Q
2	3	Andriy Kozlenko	Ukraine	31.23	Q
3	5	Matthew Levy	Australia	31.35	Q
4	6	Marian Kvasnytsia	Ukraine	33.07	Q
5	2	Jadhav Suyash Narayan	India	33.63	
6	7	Andreas Skaar Bjornstad	Norway	34.77	

=== Heat 2 ===
11:44 12 September 2016:

Rank	Lane	Name	Nationality	Time	Notes
1	5	Jingang Wang	China	31.61	Q
2	3	Carlos Serrano Zárate	Colombia	31.79	Q
3	4	Shiyun Pan	China	31.85	Q
4	6	Tobias Pollap	Germany	32.13	Q
5	2	Jean-Michel Lavalliere	Canada	34.13	
6	7	Valerio Taras	Italy	34.17	
7	1	Hannes Schuermann	Germany	36.39	

== Final ==
20:02 12 September 2016:

Rank	Lane	Name	Nationality	Time	Notes
1st place, gold medalist(s)	7	Shiyun Pan	China	28.41	WR
2nd place, silver medalist(s)	4	Ievgenii Bogodaiko	Ukraine	29.35	
3rd place, bronze medalist(s)	6	Jingang Wang	China	30.07	
4	2	Carlos Serrano Zárate	Colombia	31.07	
5	3	Matthew Levy	Australia	31.32	
6	5	Andriy Kozlenko	Ukraine	31.33	
7	8	Marian Kvasnytsia	Ukraine	32.37	
8	1	Tobias Pollap	Germany	32.91	
