= Swimming at the 2012 Summer Paralympics – Women's 100 metre freestyle S3 =

Women's 100 metre freestyle S3 at the XIV Paralympic Games
- Venue: London Aquatics Centre
- Dates: 3 September
- Competitors: 11 from 6 nations

Medalists
1st place, gold medalist(s)		Xia Jiangbo	China
2nd place, silver medalist(s)		Olga Sviderska	Ukraine
3rd place, bronze medalist(s)		Patricia Valle	Mexico

The women's 100 metre freestyle S3 event at the 2012 Paralympic Games took place on 3 September, at the London Aquatics Centre.

Two heats were held, one with five swimmers and one with six competitors. The swimmers with the eight fastest times advanced to the final.

== Heats ==
Rank	Heat	Lane	Name	Nationality	Time	Notes
1	2	4	Olga Sviderska	Ukraine	1:45.34	Q, WR
2	1	4	Xia Jiangbo	China	1:49.01	Q
3	2	5	Patricia Valle	Mexico	2:07.22	Q
4	1	5	Yip Pin Xiu	Singapore	2:09.74	Q
5	2	3	Semicha Rizaoglou	Greece	2:17.82	Q
6	1	3	Annke Conradi	Germany	2:24.12	Q
7	2	2	Haideé Aceves	Mexico	2:28.16	Q
8	1	6	Iryna Sotska	Ukraine	2:30.85	Q
9	1	2	Vera Thamm	Germany	2:34.63	
10	2	6	Ganna Ielisavetska	Ukraine	2:37.85	
11	2	7	Maria Kalpakidou	Greece	2:54.88	

== Final ==
Rank	Lane	Name	Nationality	Time	Notes
1st place, gold medalist(s)	5	Xia Jiangbo	China	1:44.32	WR
2nd place, silver medalist(s)	4	Olga Sviderska	Ukraine	1:52.91	
3rd place, bronze medalist(s)	3	Patricia Valle	Mexico	1:59.76	AM
4	6	Yip Pin Xiu	Singapore	2:09.41	
5	2	Semicha Rizaoglou	Greece	2:19.92	
6	7	Annke Conradi	Germany	2:21.92	
7	1	Haideé Aceves	Mexico	2:28.96	
8	8	Iryna Sotska	Ukraine	2:35.66	
