= Swimming at the 2012 Summer Paralympics – Men's 100 metre freestyle S7 =

Event at the 2012 Summer Paralympics

Men's 100m Freestyle S7 at the XIV Paralympic Games
- Venue: London Aquatics Centre
- Dates: 3 September 2012
- Competitors: 15 from 12 nations
- Winning time: 1:00.57

Medalists
1st place, gold medalist(s)		Pan Shiyun	China
2nd place, silver medalist(s)		Matthew Levy	Australia
3rd place, bronze medalist(s)		Lantz Lamback	United States

The men's 100m freestyle S7 event at the 2012 Summer Paralympics took place at the London Aquatics Centre on 3 September. There were two heats; the swimmers with the eight fastest times advanced to the final.

== Results ==
=== Heats ===
Competed from 10:05.

==== Heat 1 ====
Rank	Lane	Name	Nationality	Time	Notes
1	4	Lantz Lamback	United States	1:02.33	Q
2	5	Jonathan Fox	Great Britain	1:02.47	Q
3	3	Oleksandr Komarov	Ukraine	1:05.83	Q
4	2	Andrey Gladkov	Russia	1:06.38	Q
5	6	Tobias Pollap	Germany	1:06.96	
6	7	Enrique Perez Davila	Mexico	1:09.65	
7	1	Ronaldo Santos	Brazil	1:12.23	

==== Heat 2 ====
Rank	Lane	Name	Nationality	Time	Notes
1	4	Matthew Levy	Australia	1:02.87	Q
2	3	Josef Craig	Great Britain	1:04.00	Q
3	5	Pan Shiyun	China	1:04.23	Q
4	6	Yevheniy Bohodayko	Ukraine	1:06.55	Q
5	7	Marian Kvasnytsia	Ukraine	1:09.04	
6	8	Daisuke Ejima	Japan	1:10.51	
7	2	Nikolaos Tsotras	Greece	1:10.99	
8	1	Francesco Bocciardo	Italy	1:11.45	

=== Final ===
Competed at 17:49.

Rank	Lane	Name	Nationality	Time	Notes
1st place, gold medalist(s)	2	Pan Shiyun	China	1:00.57	AS
2nd place, silver medalist(s)	3	Matthew Levy	Australia	1:01.38	OC
3rd place, bronze medalist(s)	4	Lantz Lamback	United States	1:01.50	AM
4	6	Josef Craig	Great Britain	1:02.20	
5	5	Jonathan Fox	Great Britain	1:02.26	
6	8	Yevheniy Bohodayko	Ukraine	1:03.96	
7	7	Oleksandr Komarov	Ukraine	1:05.60	
8	1	Andrey Gladkov	Russia	1:06.04	

Q = qualified for final. AM = Americas Record. AS = Asian Record. OC = Oceania Record.
