= Swimming at the 2016 Summer Paralympics – Men's 200 metre individual medley SM7 =

Men's 200 metre individual medley SM7 at the XV Paralympic Games
- Venue: Olympic Aquatics Stadium
- Dates: 13 September 2016
- Competitors: 12 from 11 nations

Medalists
1st place, gold medalist(s)		Ievgenii Bogodaiko	Ukraine
2nd place, silver medalist(s)		Rudy Garcia-Tolson	United States
3rd place, bronze medalist(s)		Matthew Levy	Australia

The Men's 200 metre individual medley SM7 event at the 2016 Paralympic Games took place on 13 September 2016, at the Olympic Aquatics Stadium. Two heats were held. The swimmers with the eight fastest times advanced to the final.

== Heats ==
=== Heat 1 ===
10:04 13 September 2016:

Rank	Lane	Name	Nationality	Time	Notes
1	5	Carlos Serrano Zárate	Colombia	2:40.58	Q
2	4	Matthew Levy	Australia	2:46.04	Q
3	3	Tobias Pollap	Germany	2:46.16	Q
4	6	Valerio Taras	Italy	2:48.98	Q
5	7	Dino Sinovcic	Croatia	3:01.93	
	2	Hannes Schuermann	Germany		DSQ

=== Heat 2 ===
10:09 13 September 2016:

Rank	Lane	Name	Nationality	Time	Notes
1	5	Rudy Garcia-Tolson	United States	2:43.26	Q
2	4	Ievgenii Bogodaiko	Ukraine	2:44.89	Q
3	3	Jingang Wang	China	2:49.56	Q
4	6	Andreas Skaar Bjornstad	Norway	2:50.76	Q
5	2	Antoni Ponce Bertran	Spain	2:56.60	
6	7	Suyash Jadhav	India	3:01.05	

== Final ==
17:52 13 September 2016:

Rank	Lane	Name	Nationality	Time	Notes
1st place, gold medalist(s)	3	Ievgenii Bogodaiko	Ukraine	2:30.72	WR
2nd place, silver medalist(s)	5	Rudy Garcia-Tolson	United States	2:33.87	
3rd place, bronze medalist(s)	6	Matthew Levy	Australia	2:36.99	
4	4	Carlos Serrano Zárate	Colombia	2:37.08	
5	1	Jingang Wang	China	2:38.30	
6	2	Tobias Pollap	Germany	2:45.40	
7	7	Valerio Taras	Italy	2:47.27	
8	8	Andreas Skaar Bjornstad	Norway	2:48.06	
