= Swimming at the 2012 Summer Paralympics – Men's 200 metre individual medley SM7 =

Event at the 2012 Summer Paralympics

Men's 200m Ind. Medley SM7 at the XIV Paralympic Games
- Venue: London Aquatics Centre
- Dates: 2 September 2012
- Competitors: 11 from 7 nations
- Winning time: 2:33.13

Medalists
1st place, gold medalist(s)		Yevheniy Bohodayko	Ukraine
2nd place, silver medalist(s)		Rudy Garcia-Tolson	United States
3rd place, bronze medalist(s)		Matthew Levy	Australia

The men's 200m ind. medley SM7 event at the 2012 Summer Paralympics took place at the London Aquatics Centre on 2 September. There were two heats; the swimmers with the eight fastest times advanced to the final.

== Results ==
=== Heats ===
Competed from 09:30.

==== Heat 1 ====
Rank	Lane	Name	Nationality	Time	Notes
1	4	Mihovil Spanja	Croatia	2:40.14	Q
2	5	Yang Huaqiang	China	2:40.59	Q, AS
3	3	Yevheniy Bohodayko	Ukraine	2:42.39	Q
4	6	Tobias Pollap	Germany	2:51.26	Q
5	2	Jay Dohnt	Australia	2:54.18	

==== Heat 2 ====
Rank	Lane	Name	Nationality	Time	Notes
1	4	Rudy Garcia-Tolson	United States	2:35.48	Q, WR
2	5	Matthew Levy	Australia	2:37.69	Q, OC
3	3	Wang Jingang	China	2:49.32	Q
4	6	Lantz Lamback	United States	2:49.71	Q
5	2	Oleksandr Komarov	Ukraine	2:54.14	
	7	Daisuke Ejima	Japan	DSQ	

=== Final ===
Competed at 17:30.

Rank	Lane	Name	Nationality	Time	Notes
1st place, gold medalist(s)	2	Yevheniy Bohodayko	Ukraine	2:33.13	WR
2nd place, silver medalist(s)	4	Rudy Garcia-Tolson	United States	2:33.94	AM
3rd place, bronze medalist(s)	5	Matthew Levy	Australia	2:37.18	OC
4	6	Yang Huaqiang	China	2:40.52	AS
5	3	Mihovil Spanja	Croatia	2:41.52	
6	7	Wang Jingang	China	2:42.13	
7	1	Lantz Lamback	United States	2:45.54	
8	8	Tobias Pollap	Germany	2:46.39	

'Q = qualified for final. WR = World Record. AM = Americas Record. AS = Asian Record. OC = Oceania Record. DSQ = Disqualified.
