= Swimming at the 2012 Summer Paralympics – Men's 50 metre freestyle S7 =

Event at the 2012 Summer Paralympics

Men's 50m Freestyle S7 at the XIV Paralympic Games
- Venue: London Aquatics Centre
- Dates: 4 September 2012
- Competitors: 14 from 10 nations
- Winning time: 27.84

Medalists
1st place, gold medalist(s)		Lantz Lamback	United States
2nd place, silver medalist(s)		Pan Shiyun	China
3rd place, bronze medalist(s)		Matthew Walker	Great Britain

The men's 50m freestyle S7 event at the 2012 Summer Paralympics took place at the London Aquatics Centre on 4 September. There were two heats; the swimmers with the eight fastest times advanced to the final.

== Results ==
=== Heats ===
The competitors competed from 11:35.

==== Heat 1 ====
Rank	Lane	Name	Nationality	Time	Notes
1	4	Lantz Lamback	United States	28.29	Q, AM
2	6	Yevheniy Bohodayko	Ukraine	28.88	Q
3	5	Pan Shiyun	China	28.97	Q, AS
4	3	Jonathan Fox	Great Britain	29.38	Q
5	2	Tobias Pollap	Germany	30.70	Q
6	7	Ievgen Poltavskyi	Ukraine	32.07	
7	1	Antonio Sanchez Francisco	Andorra	1:00.84	

==== Heat 2 ====
Rank	Lane	Name	Nationality	Time	Notes
1	4	Matthew Walker	Great Britain	28.59	Q
2	5	Matthew Levy	Australia	28.63	Q, OC
3	6	Josef Craig	Great Britain	29.48	Q
4	3	Oleksandr Komarov	Ukraine	30.79	
5	2	Nikolaos Tsotras	Greece	31.09	
6	7	Andrey Gladkov	Russia	31.84	
7	1	Enrique Perez Davila	Mexico	32.41	

=== Final ===
The final was held at 20:03.

Rank	Lane	Name	Nationality	Time	Notes
1st place, gold medalist(s)	4	Lantz Lamback	United States	27.84	PR
2nd place, silver medalist(s)	2	Pan Shiyun	China	28.09	AS
3rd place, bronze medalist(s)	5	Matthew Walker	Great Britain	28.47	
4	3	Matthew Levy	Australia	28.58	OC
5	6	Yevheniy Bohodayko	Ukraine	28.69	
6	7	Jonathan Fox	Great Britain	28.87	
7	1	Josef Craig	Great Britain	29.39	
8	8	Tobias Pollap	Germany	29.57	

Q = qualified for final. PR = Paralympic Record. AM = Americas Record. AS = Asian Record. OC = Oceania Record.
