= Harriet Lee =

Harriet Lee may refer to:

- Harriet Lee (singer) (fl. 1925–1973), American singer and voice coach
- Harriet Lee (swimmer) (born 1991), British Paralympic swimmer
- Harriet Lee (writer) (1757–1851), English novelist and playwright
