= Swimming at the 2012 Summer Paralympics – Women's 200 metre individual medley SM5 =

Women's 200m Ind. Medley SM5 at the XIV Paralympic Games
- Venue: London Aquatics Centre
- Dates: 31 August
- Competitors: 10 from 10 nations
- Winning time: 3:13.43

Medalists
| 1st place, gold medalist(s) | | Nataliia Prologaieva | Ukraine |
| 2nd place, silver medalist(s) | | Sarah Louise Rung | Norway |
| 3rd place, bronze medalist(s) | | Teresa Perales | Spain |

The women's 200m ind. medley SM5 event at the 2012 Summer Paralympics took place at the London Aquatics Centre on 31 August. There were two heats; the swimmers with the eight fastest times advanced to the final.

== Results ==
=== Heats ===
Competed from 11:37.

==== Heat 1 ====
| Rank | Lane | Name | Nationality | Time | Notes |
|---|---|---|---|---|---|
| 1 | 5 | Nataliia Prologaieva | Ukraine | 3:15.50 | Q |
| 2 | 6 | Wu Qi | China | 3:41.99 | Q |
| 3 | 4 | Joana Maria Silva | Brazil | 4:02.26 | Q |
| 4 | 3 | Lorena Homar Lopez | Spain | 4:06.39 | Q |
| 5 | 2 | Natalia Gavrilyuk | Russia | 4:23.58 | |
| 6 | 7 | Stefania Chiarioni | Italy | 4:52.25 | |
| 7 | 1 | Reka Kezdi | Hungary | DSQ | |

==== Heat 2 ====
| Rank | Lane | Name | Nationality | Time | Notes |
|---|---|---|---|---|---|
| 1 | 4 | Sarah Louise Rung | Norway | 3:19.59 | Q |
| 2 | 6 | Teresa Perales | Spain | 3:33.84 | Q |
| 3 | 5 | Natalia Shavel | Belarus | 3:43.37 | Q |
| 4 | 3 | Katalin Engelhardt | Hungary | 4:08.97 | Q |
| 5 | 2 | Diana Zambo | Hungary | 4:23.87 | |
| 6 | 7 | Luo Alice Hsiao Hung | Chinese Taipei | 4:32.59 | |
| 7 | 1 | Naiver Ome Ramos | Colombia | 4:52.91 | |

=== Final ===
Competed at 20:21.

| Rank | Lane | Name | Nationality | Time | Notes |
|---|---|---|---|---|---|
| 1st place, gold medalist(s) | 4 | Nataliia Prologaieva | Ukraine | 3:13.43 | WR |
| 2nd place, silver medalist(s) | 5 | Sarah Louise Rung | Norway | 3:15.89 | |
| 3rd place, bronze medalist(s) | 3 | Teresa Perales | Spain | 3:28.58 | |
| 4 | 6 | Wu Qi | China | 3:38.66 | AS |
| 5 | 2 | Natalia Shavel | Belarus | 3:42.27 | |
| 6 | 7 | Joana Maria Silva | Brazil | 3:59.42 | AM |
| 7 | 1 | Lorena Homar Lopez | Spain | 4:03.16 | |
| 8 | 8 | Katalin Engelhardt | Hungary | 4:07.84 | |

'Q = qualified for final. WR = World Record. AM = Americas Record. AS = Asian Record. DNS = Did not start.
