= Swimming at the 2012 Summer Paralympics – Men's 100 metre backstroke S7 =

Men's 100 metre backstroke S7 at the XIV Paralympic Games
- Venue: London Aquatics Centre
- Dates: 30 August 2012
- Competitors: 16 from 11 nations

Medalists
1st place, gold medalist(s)		Jonathan Fox	Great Britain
2nd place, silver medalist(s)		Yevheniy Bohodayko	Ukraine
3rd place, bronze medalist(s)		Mihovil Spanja	Croatia

The men's 100 metre backstroke S7 event at the 2012 Paralympic Games took place on 30 August, at the London Aquatics Centre in the Olympic Park, London. The event was for athletes included in the S7 classification, which is for competitors with physical impairments. Sixteen swimmers took part, representing a total of eleven different nations. Great Britain's Jonathan Fox set a new world record in the heats and went on to win the gold medal.

== Competition ==
=== Heats ===
Two heats were held, each with eight swimmers; the swimmers with the eight fastest times advanced to the final. The heats took place on 30 August starting at 10:39 BST.

Yevheniy Bohodayko of Ukraine won the first heat in a time of one minute 12.79 seconds. Bohodayko qualified for the final along with Mihovil Spanja of Croatia, fellow Ukrainian Marian Kvasnytsia and China's Nan Gao. Nan Gao set a new Asian record time of one minute 15.05 seconds.

British swimmer Jonathan Fox broke his own world record, setting a time of one minute 9.86 seconds to win heat 2 and qualify fastest for the final. Other qualifiers from the second heat were Guillermo Marro of Argentina, Andrey Gladkov of Russia and Ievgen Poltavskyi of Ukraine.

=== Final ===
The final took place on 30 August 2012 at 18:52 BST. Jonathan Fox won the gold medal in a time of one minute 10.46 seconds, earning Great Britain's first swimming gold medal of the Games. Silver went to Ukraine's Bohodayko, who finished 0.85 seconds behind the winner, and the bronze to Spanja of Croatia. Chinese swimmer Nan Gao finished in seventh position but broke the Asian record which he had set in the heats. Marian Kvasnytsia was disqualified.

== Results ==
Key

- Q Qualified for next round
- AS = Asian record
- WR = World record

=== Heats ===
==== Heat 1 ====
Rank	Lane	Name	Nationality	Time	Notes
1	3	Yevheniy Bohodayko	Ukraine	1:12.79	Q
2	4	Mihovil Spanja	Croatia	1:13.36	Q
3	5	Marian Kvasnytsia	Ukraine	1:14.63	Q
4	6	Nan Gao	China	1:15.05	Q, AS
5	7	Daisuke Ejima	Japan	1:15.39	
6	2	Italo Pereira	Brazil	1:16.21	
7	1	Francesco Bocciardo	Italy	1:25.25	
8	8	Enrique Perez Davila	Mexico	1:25.87	

==== Heat 2 ====
Rank	Lane	Name	Nationality	Time	Notes
1	4	Jonathan Fox	Great Britain	1:09.86	Q, WR
2	6	Guillermo Marro	Argentina	1:13.94	Q
3	2	Andrey Gladkov	Russia	1:14.33	Q
4	3	Ievgen Poltavskyi	Ukraine	1:14.52	Q
5	5	Lantz Lamback	United States	1:15.49	
6	7	Matias de Andrade	Argentina	1:16.74	
7	1	Ronaldo Santos	Brazil	1:22.37	
8	8	Jumpei Kimura	Japan	1:23.32	

=== Final ===
Rank	Lane	Name	Nationality	Time	Notes
1st place, gold medalist(s)	4	Jonathan Fox	Great Britain	1:10.46	
2nd place, silver medalist(s)	5	Yevheniy Bohodayko	Ukraine	1:11.31	
3rd place, bronze medalist(s)	3	Mihovil Spanja	Croatia	1:12.53	
4	7	Ievgen Poltavskyi	Ukraine	1:14.03	
5	6	Guillermo Marro	Argentina	1:14.19	
6	2	Andrey Gladkov	Russia	1:14.26	
7	8	Nan Gao	China	1:14.71	AS
8	1	Marian Kvasnytsia	Ukraine	Disqualified	
