= Swimming at the 2012 Summer Paralympics – Women's 50 metre freestyle S3 =

Women's 50 metre freestyle S3 at the XIV Paralympic Games
- Venue: London Aquatics Centre
- Dates: 7 September
- Competitors: 9 from 7 nations

Medalists
1st place, gold medalist(s)		Jiangbo Xia	China
2nd place, silver medalist(s)		Olga Sviderska	Ukraine
3rd place, bronze medalist(s)		Patricia Valle	Mexico

The women's 50 metre freestyle S3 event at the 2012 Paralympic Games took place on 7 September, at the London Aquatics Centre.

Two heats were held, one with four swimmers and one with five swimmers. The swimmers with the eight fastest times advance to the finals.

== Heats ==
Rank	Heat	Lane	Name	Nationality	Time	Notes
1	2	4	Olga Sviderska	Ukraine	48.64	Q
2	1	4	Jiangbo Xia	China	52.73	Q
3	2	5	Patricia Valle	Mexico	59.04	Q
4	1	5	Pin Xiu Yip	Singapore	1:00.52	Q
5	2	3	Semicha Rizaoglou	Greece	1:05.02	Q
6	1	3	Annke Conradi	Germany	1:05.51	Q
7	2	6	Haideé Aceves	Mexico	1:07.89	Q
8	1	6	Vera Thamm	Germany	1:10.90	Q
9	2	2	Esther Overton	Australia	1:12.24	

== Final ==
Rank	Lane	Name	Nationality	Time	Notes
1st place, gold medalist(s)	5	Jiangbo Xia	China	48.11	WR
2nd place, silver medalist(s)	4	Olga Sviderska	Ukraine	48.39	EU
3rd place, bronze medalist(s)	3	Patricia Valle	Mexico	55.74	AM
4	6	Pin Xiu Yip	Singapore	1:01.64	
5	2	Semicha Rizaoglou	Greece	1:08.56	
6	1	Haideé Aceves	Mexico	1:09.99	
7	7	Annke Conradi	Germany	1:10.38	
8	8	Vera Thamm	Germany	1:17.04	
