= Swimming at the 2012 Summer Paralympics – Men's 50 metre butterfly S7 =

Event at the 2012 Summer Paralympics

Men's 50m Butterfly S7 at the XIV Paralympic Games
- Venue: London Aquatics Centre
- Dates: 31 August 2012
- Competitors: 11 from 8 nations
- Winning time: 29.49

Medalists
1st place, gold medalist(s)		Pan Shiyun	China
2nd place, silver medalist(s)		Yevheniy Bohodayko	Ukraine
3rd place, bronze medalist(s)		Wang Jingang	China

The men's 50m butterfly S7 event at the 2012 Summer Paralympics took place at the London Aquatics Centre on 31 August. There were two heats; the swimmers with the eight fastest times advanced to the final.

== Results ==
=== Heats ===
Competed from 10:01.

==== Heat 1 ====
Rank	Lane	Name	Nationality	Time	Notes
1	4	Yevheniy Bohodayko	Ukraine	30.41	Q, EU
2	3	Matthew Levy	Australia	31.68	Q, OC
3	5	Yang Yuanrun	China	32.36	Q
4	6	Lantz Lamback	United States	33.76	Q
5	2	Ievgen Poltavskyi	Ukraine	35.01	

==== Heat 2 ====
Rank	Lane	Name	Nationality	Time	Notes
1	5	Wang Jingang	China	32.25	Q
2	4	Pan Shiyun	China	32.42	Q
3	3	Matthew Walker	Great Britain	33.06	Q
4	6	Daisuke Ejima	Japan	33.14	Q
5	2	Tobias Pollap	Germany	35.54	
6	7	Enrique Perez Davila	Mexico	39.21	

=== Final ===
Competed at 17:52.

Rank	Lane	Name	Nationality	Time	Notes
1st place, gold medalist(s)	2	Pan Shiyun	China	29.49	WR
2nd place, silver medalist(s)	4	Yevheniy Bohodayko	Ukraine	30.19	EU
3rd place, bronze medalist(s)	3	Wang Jingang	China	30.75	
4	5	Matthew Levy	Australia	31.54	OC
5	1	Daisuke Ejima	Japan	32.88	
6	8	Lantz Lamback	United States	32.97	AM
7	7	Matthew Walker	Great Britain	33.93	
	6	Yang Yuanrun	China	DSQ	

'Q = qualified for final. WR = World Record. AM = Americas Record. EU = European Record. OC = Oceania Record. DSQ = Disqualified.
