= Swimming at the 2012 Summer Paralympics – Women's 100 metre breaststroke SB4 =

Women's 100 metre Breaststroke SB4 at the XIV Paralympic Games
- Venue: London Aquatics Centre
- Dates: 4 September
- Competitors: 12 from 11 nations

Medalists
1st place, gold medalist(s)		Nataliia Prologaieva	Ukraine
2nd place, silver medalist(s)		Sarah Louise Rung	Norway
3rd place, bronze medalist(s)		Teresa Perales	Spain

The women's 100 metre breaststroke SB4 event at the 2012 Paralympic Games took place on 4 September, at the London Aquatics Centre.

Two heats were held, both with six swimmers. The swimmers with the eight fastest times advanced to the final.

== Heats ==
=== Heat 1 ===
Rank	Lane	Name	Nationality	Time	Notes
1	4	Nataliia Prologaieva	Ukraine	1:44.90	Q, WR
2	5	Inbal Pezaro	Israel	1:57.95	Q
3	6	Chrysoula Antoniadou	Greece	2:04.56	Q
4	3	Alice Hsiao Hung Luo	Chinese Taipei	2:06.80	Q
5	2	Katalin Engelhardt	Hungary	2:10.53	
6	7	Naiver Ome Ramos	Colombia	2:20.51	

=== Heat 2 ===
Rank	Lane	Name	Nationality	Time	Notes
1	4	Sarah Louise Rung	Norway	1:45.58	Q
2	5	Teresa Perales	Spain	1:56.90	Q
3	3	Natalia Shavel	Belarus	2:04.55	Q
4	2	Qi Wu	China	2:10.31	Q
5	6	Natalia Gavrilyuk	Russia	2:14.76	
6	7	Lorena Homar Lopez	Spain	2:18.19	

== Final ==
Rank	Lane	Name	Nationality	Time	Notes
1st place, gold medalist(s)	4	Nataliia Prologaieva	Ukraine	1:43.99	WR
2nd place, silver medalist(s)	5	Sarah Louise Rung	Norway	1:45.68	
3rd place, bronze medalist(s)	3	Teresa Perales	Spain	1:56.17	
4	6	Inbal Pezaro	Israel	1:56.73	
5	2	Natalia Shavel	Belarus	2:00.03	
6	7	Chrysoula Antoniadou	Greece	2:03.80	
7	1	Alice Hsiao Hung Luo	Chinese Taipei	2:06.05	
8	8	Qi Wu	China	2:09.70	
