= 2015 IPC Swimming World Championships – Men's 50 metre butterfly =

The men's 50 metre butterfly at the 2015 IPC Swimming World Championships was held at the Tollcross International Swimming Centre in Glasgow, United Kingdom from 13 to 17 July.

== Medalists ==
Event	Gold		Silver		Bronze	
S5	Daniel Dias; Brazil	35.51	Roy Perkins; United States	35.67	Andrew Mullen; Great Britain	37.14
S6	Zheng Tao; China	31.17	Xu Qing; China	31.25	Sascha Kindred; Great Britain	32.01
S7	Pan Shiyun; China	29.49 =WR	Yevheniy Bohodayko; Ukraine	29.82 EU	Wang Jingang; China	30.51

Legend
WR: World record, CR: Championship record, AF: Africa record, AM: Americas record, AS: Asian record, EU: European record, OS: Oceania record

== See also ==
- List of IPC world records in swimming
