= Cycling at the 2012 Summer Paralympics – Men's road time trial C5 =

Cycling, Men's road time trial C5 at the XIV Paralympic Games
- Venue: Brands Hatch
- Dates: September 5, 2012
- Competitors: 14 from 13 nations

Medalists
1st place, gold medalist(s)		Yegor Dementyev	Ukraine
2nd place, silver medalist(s)		Liu Xinyang	China
3rd place, bronze medalist(s)		Michael Gallagher	Australia

The Men's time trial C5 road cycling event at the 2012 Summer Paralympics took place on September 5 at Brands Hatch. Fourteen riders from thirteen different nations competed. The race distance was 24 km.

== Results ==
Rank	Name	Country	Time
1st place, gold medalist(s)	Yegor Dementyev	Ukraine	32:12.98
2nd place, silver medalist(s)	Liu Xinyang	China	32:21.03
3rd place, bronze medalist(s)	Michael Gallagher	Australia	33:12.03
4	Andrea Tarlao	Italy	33:15.94
5	Bastiaan Gruppen	Netherlands	33:25.75
6	Wolfgang Eibeck	Austria	33:43.81
7	Soelito Gohr	Brazil	33:53.36
8	Rodny Minier	Dominican Republic	34:35.42
9	Joao Alberto Schwindt Filho	Brazil	35:03.39
10	Wolfgang Sacher	Germany	35:13.84
11	Cathal Miller	Ireland	35:14.82
12	Chris Ross	New Zealand	36:17.18
13	Jon-Allan Butterworth	Great Britain	36:56.39
14	Cedric Ramassamy	France	37:30.89
