= Swimming at the 2012 Summer Paralympics – Women's 50 metre backstroke S2 =

Women's 50m Backstroke S2 at the XIV Paralympic Games
- Venue: London Aquatics Centre
- Dates: 5 September
- Competitors: 11 from 8 nations
- Winning time: 1:03.00

Medalists
1st place, gold medalist(s)		Feng Yazhu	China
2nd place, silver medalist(s)		Ganna Ielisavetska	Ukraine
3rd place, bronze medalist(s)		Iryna Sotska	Ukraine

The women's 50m backstroke S2 event at the 2012 Summer Paralympics took place at the London Aquatics Centre on 5 September. There were two heats; the swimmers with the eight fastest times advanced to the final.

== Results ==
=== Final ===
Competed at 20:01.

Rank	Lane	Name	Nationality	Time	Notes
1st place, gold medalist(s)	5	Feng Yazhu	China	1:03.00	WR
2nd place, silver medalist(s)	4	Ganna Ielisavetska	Ukraine	1:04.14	EU
3rd place, bronze medalist(s)	3	Iryna Sotska	Ukraine	1:05.16	
4	6	Daria Kopaieva	Ukraine	1:14.32	
5	2	Esther Overton	Australia	1:16.09	
6	7	Maria Kalpakidou	Greece	1:24.37	

'Q = qualified for final. WR = World Record. EU = European Record. AF = African Record.
