= Swimming at the 2012 Summer Paralympics – Men's 100 metre breaststroke SB6 =

Event at the 2012 Summer Paralympics

Men's 100 metre breaststroke SB6 at the XIV Paralympic Games
- Venue: London Aquatics Centre
- Dates: 5 September 2012
- Competitors: 10 from 9 nations

Medalists
1st place, gold medalist(s)		Yevheniy Bohodayko	Ukraine
2nd place, silver medalist(s)		Torben Schmidtke	Germany
3rd place, bronze medalist(s)		Christoph Burkard	Germany

The men's 100 metre breaststroke SB6 event at the 2012 Paralympic Games took place on 5 September, at the London Aquatics Centre.

Two heats were held, both with five swimmers. The swimmers with the eight fastest times advanced to the final.

== Heats ==
=== Heat 1 ===
Rank	Lane	Name	Nationality	Time	Notes
1	5	Torben Schmidtke	Germany	1:26.13	Q, PR
2	4	Mihovil Spanja	Croatia	1:28.96	Q
3	6	Alexey Fomenkov	Russia	1:30.98	Q
4	3	Jay Dohnt	Australia	1:32.79	Q
5	2	Yoav Valinsky	Israel	1:34.31	

=== Heat 2 ===
Rank	Lane	Name	Nationality	Time	Notes
1	4	Yevheniy Bohodayko	Ukraine	1:23.86	Q, PR
2	5	Christoph Burkard	Germany	1:27.60	Q
3	6	Nelson Crispín	Colombia	1:28.42	Q
4	3	Jumpei Kimura	Japan	1:29.54	Q
5	2	Matthew Whorwood	Great Britain	1:36.09	

== Final ==
Rank	Lane	Name	Nationality	Time	Notes
1st place, gold medalist(s)	4	Yevheniy Bohodayko	Ukraine	1:20.17	WR
2nd place, silver medalist(s)	5	Torben Schmidtke	Germany	1:25.23	
3rd place, bronze medalist(s)	3	Christoph Burkard	Germany	1:27.09	
4	6	Nelson Crispín	Colombia	1:27.19	AM
5	2	Mihovil Spanja	Croatia	1:28.45	
6	1	Alexey Fomenkov	Russia	1:32.55	
7	8	Jay Dohnt	Australia	1:33.53	
	7	Jumpei Kimura	Japan	DSQ	
