= Swimming at the 2012 Summer Paralympics – Women's 50 metre freestyle S5 =

Women's 50 metre freestyle S5 at the XIV Paralympic Games
- Venue: London Aquatics Centre
- Dates: 30 August
- Competitors: 11 from 10 nations

Medalists
1st place, gold medalist(s)		Nataliia Prologaieva	Ukraine
2nd place, silver medalist(s)		Teresa Perales	Spain
3rd place, bronze medalist(s)		Inbal Pezaro	Israel

The women's 50 metre freestyle S5 event at the 2012 Paralympic Games took place on 30 August, at the London Aquatics Centre.

Two heats were held, one with six swimmers and one with five swimmers. The swimmers with the eight fastest times advanced to the final.

== Heats ==
Rank	Heat	Lane	Name	Nationality	Time	Notes
1	2	4	Nataliia Prologaieva	Ukraine	36.43	Q
2	1	4	Teresa Perales	Spain	37.06	Q
3	1	5	Joana Maria Silva	Brazil	38.73	Q
4	1	3	Viktoriia Savtsova	Ukraine	39.12	Q
5	2	3	Inbal Pezaro	Israel	39.74	Q
6	2	7	Katalin Engelhardt	Hungary	43.94	Q
7	2	6	Simone Fragoso	Portugal	44.49	Q
8	1	6	Lisette Teunissen	Netherlands	46.63	Q
9	1	2	Alyssa Gialamas	United States	47.08	
10	2	2	Rui Si Theresa Goh	Singapore	47.91	
–	2	5	Anita Fatis	France	DNS	

== Final ==
Rank	Lane	Name	Nationality	Time	Notes
1st place, gold medalist(s)	4	Nataliia Prologaieva	Ukraine	35.88	=WR
2nd place, silver medalist(s)	5	Teresa Perales	Spain	36.50	
3rd place, bronze medalist(s)	2	Inbal Pezaro	Israel	37.89	
4	3	Joana Maria Silva	Brazil	38.11	AM
5	6	Viktoriia Savtsova	Ukraine	38.50	
6	7	Katalin Engelhardt	Hungary	44.06	
7	1	Simone Fragoso	Portugal	44.78	
8	8	Lisette Teunissen	Netherlands	44.82	PR
