= Esther Overton =

Australian Paralympic swimmer (born 1990)

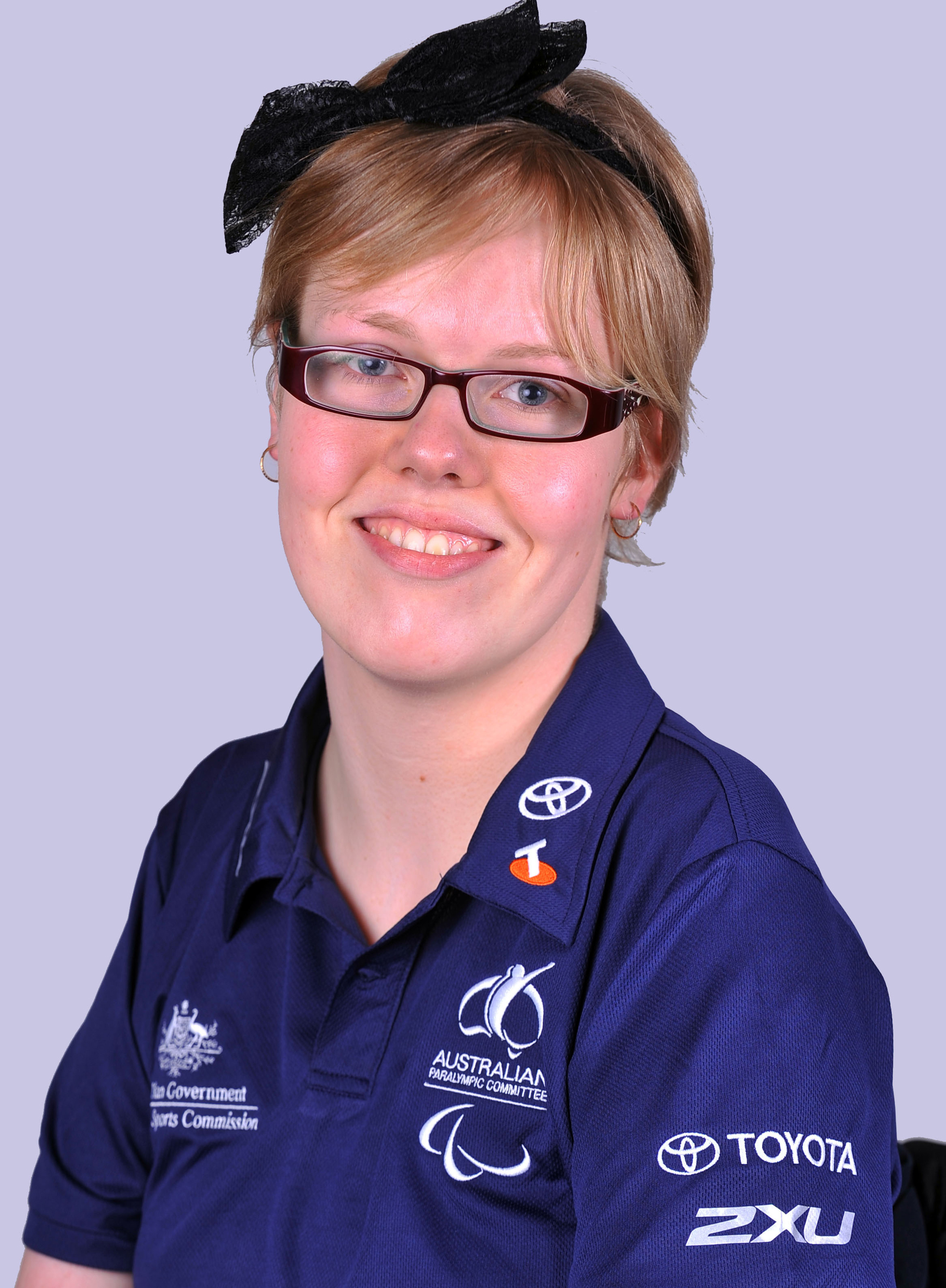
- 2012 Australian Paralympic team portrait of Overton

Personal information
- Full name: Esther Overton
- Nationality: Australia
- Born: 26 March 1990 (age 36) Launceston, Tasmania, Australia

Sport
- Sport: Swimming
- Strokes: Freestyle, butterfly, backstroke
- Classifications: S1, SB1, SM1
- Club: Burnside
- Coach: Shelly Camy
Medal record
Women's paralympic swimming
Representing Australia
World Championships (LC)
Silver medal – second place	2006 Durban	Women's 50 m Backstroke S3
Silver medal – second place	2006 Durban	Women's 50 m Butterfly S3

Esther Overton (born 26 March 1990) is an Australian swimmer. She competed at the 2008 and the 2012 Summer Paralympics.

== Early life ==
Overton was born on 26 March 1990 in Launceston, Tasmania. She currently resides in Enfield, South Australia. Back in 2012, she was a student at the University of Adelaide where she was working on a Bachelor of Commerce.

== Personal life ==
Overton has arthrogryposis multiplex congenita, a medical condition which "causes muscle weakness and a tendency for bones to break easily". It also results in joints that are immobile. Her arm has been broken more than forty times; she has coped with multiple bulging discs and had six surgeries on her knee since 2008. Because of her disability, she has required the use of an electric wheelchair and was in constant pain. Thence, Overton's legs were amputated, one each in November 2022 and February 2023.

== Swimming ==
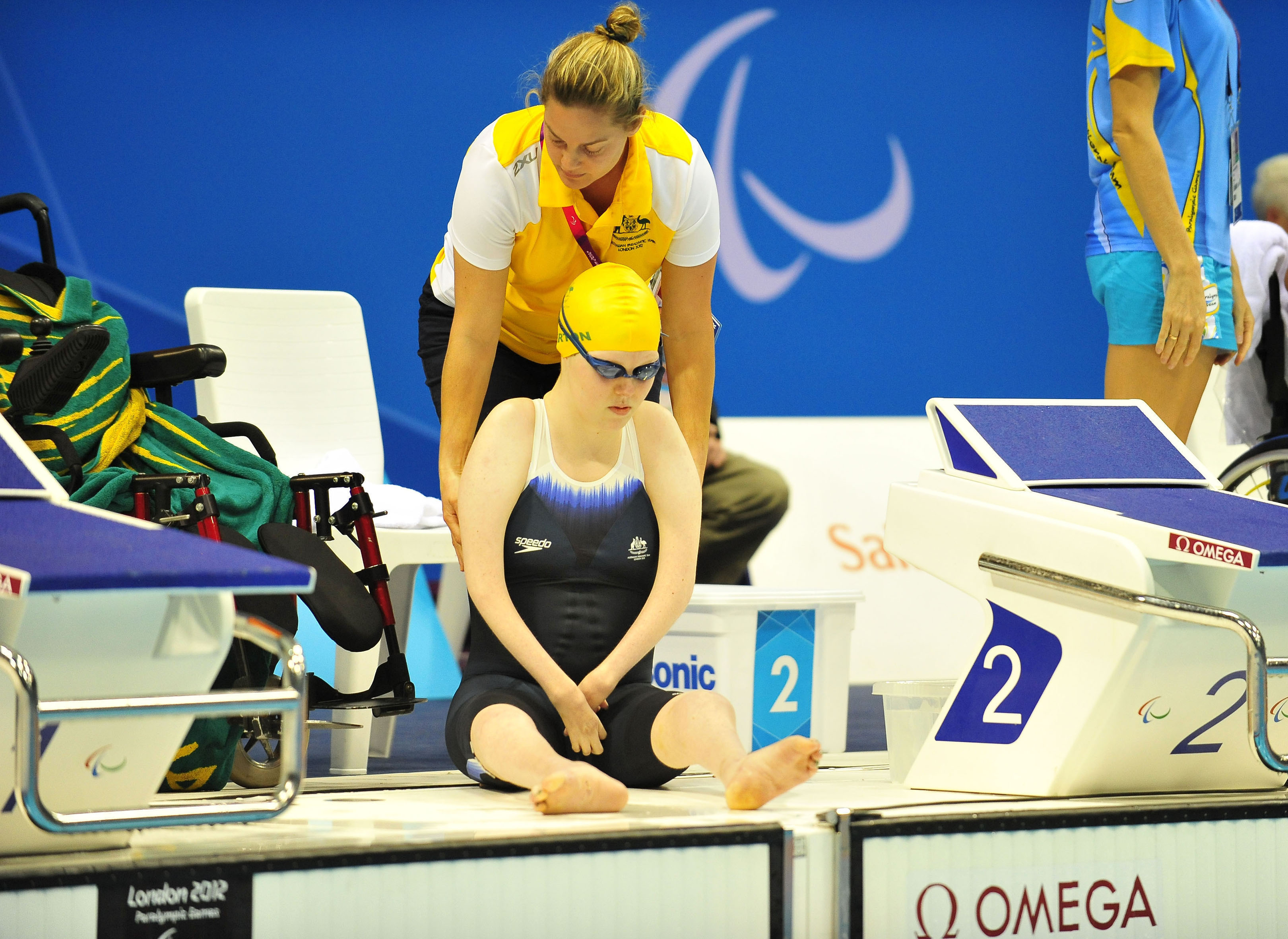
Overton at the 2012 London Paralympics

Overton is a S1 classified swimmer. When swimming, she cannot use her arms and uses her head instead of hands on the touchpad. She competes in the 50 metres backstroke, freestyle. Overton is a member of the Burnside Swimming Club. She is coached by Shelly Camy, who became her coach eighteen months before the start of the 2012 Summer Paralympics. Part of her training includes Pilates.

Overton started swimming as physiotherapy when she was a baby, and started competing at twelve years old. She made her national team debut at the 2006 IPC World Championships in Durban, winning a silver medal in the 50 metres butterfly and backstroke events. She competed at the 2008 Summer Paralympics in two events. Competing in the 50 metres backstroke event, she finished fifth. In the 50 metres freestyle, she finished sixth. Seven weeks before the 2008 Games, she had a collapsed lung and a day before the start of the Games, she broke an arm.

Overton competed at the 2010 Australian National Championships. Prior to the event, she had applied for an exemption so she could wear a swimsuit that had a zipper. When this was declined, she tried to put on a legal swimsuit and broke her arm in the process but she continued competing with the injury. She competed at the 2010 Paralympic World Championships. At the 2011 Para Pacific Championships, she finished third in the 50 metres backstroke event. In October 2011, she got a new swimming coach. Going into the 2012 National Championships, she was dealing with three bulging spinal discs as a result of swimming into a wall three weeks before the event.

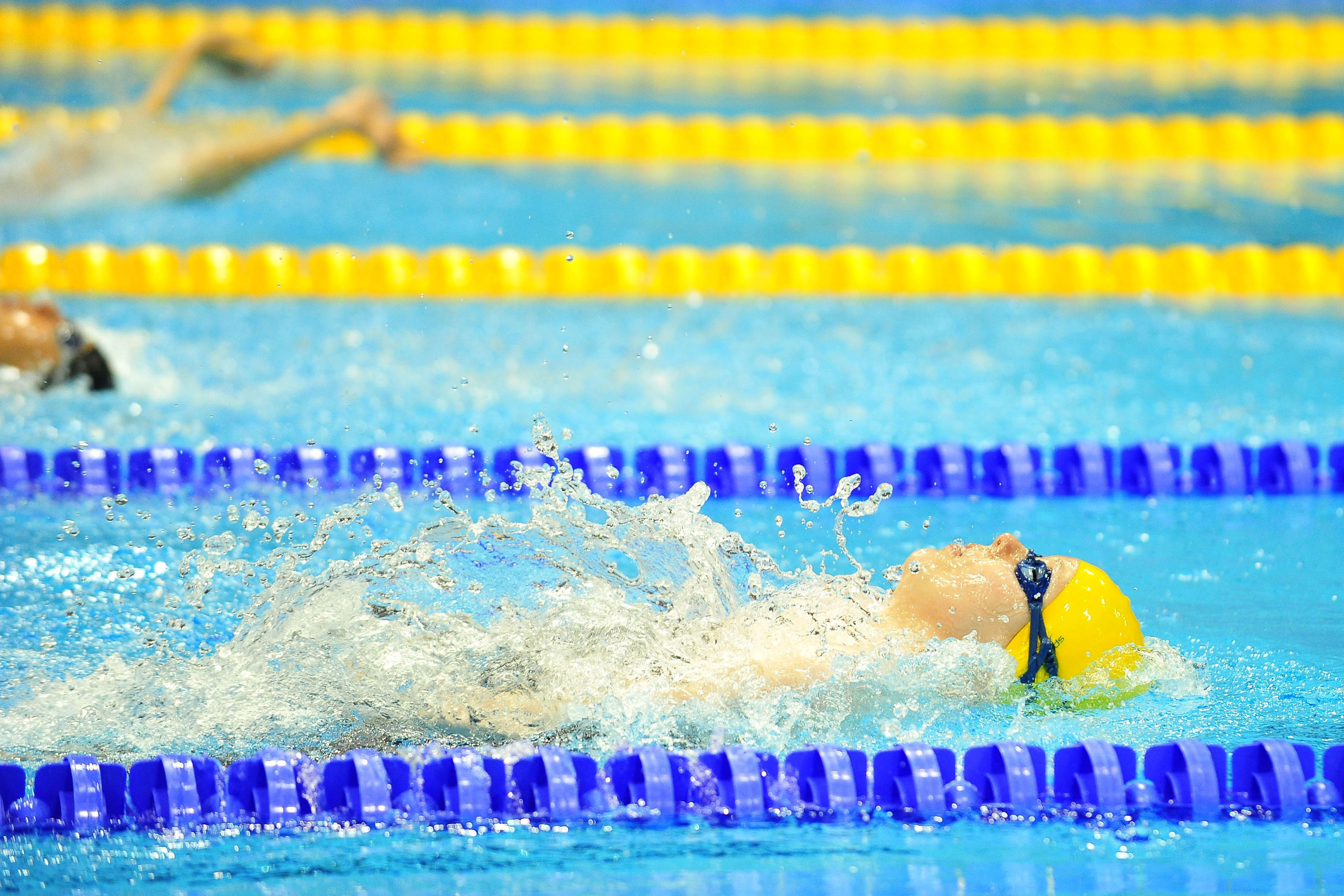
Overton at the 2012 London Paralympics

As a twenty-two-year-old, Overton was selected to represent Australia at the 2012 Summer Paralympics in the 50 metre backstroke S2 and the 50 metre freestyle S3 events. She was one of three South Australians representing Australia in swimming at the Paralympics.

In April 2013 at the age of 23, Overton retired from professional swimming. She was forced to consider her future after a lack of competitor interest in her classification led to the cancellation her event at the 2013 IPC Swimming World Championships.

She is an inductee of the Swimming South Australia Hall of Fame.

Overton unretired in December 2023, when she already underwent rehabilitation after her double amputations.
