= Swimming at the 2012 Summer Paralympics – Men's 50 metre freestyle S11 =

Event at the 2012 Summer Paralympics

Men's 50m Freestyle S11 at the XIV Paralympic Games
- Venue: London Aquatics Centre
- Dates: 1 September 2012
- Competitors: 14 from 10 nations
- Winning time: 25.27

Medalists
1st place, gold medalist(s)		Yang Bozun	China
2nd place, silver medalist(s)		Bradley Snyder	United States
3rd place, bronze medalist(s)		Enhamed Enhamed	Spain

The men's 50m freestyle S11 event at the 2012 Summer Paralympics took place at the London Aquatics Centre on 1 September. There were two heats; the swimmers with the eight fastest times advanced to the final.

== Results ==
=== Heats ===
Competed from 11:13.

==== Heat 1 ====
Rank	Lane	Name	Nationality	Time	Notes
1	4	Yang Bozun	China	25.33	Q, WR
2	5	Keiichi Kimura	Japan	27.29	Q
3	3	Viktor Smyrnov	Ukraine	27.55	Q
4	6	Rustam Nurmukhametov	Russia	27.80	Q
5	7	Matheus Souza	Brazil	28.04	
6	2	Oleksandr Mashchenko	Ukraine	28.47	
7	1	Dmytro Zalevskyy	Ukraine	29.37	

==== Heat 2 ====
Rank	Lane	Name	Nationality	Time	Notes
1	5	Bradley Snyder	United States	26.33	Q
2	3	Hendri Herbst	South Africa	27.02	Q, AF
3	6	Alexander Chekurov	Russia	27.10	Q
4	4	Enhamed Enhamed	Spain	27.34	Q
5	2	Junichi Kawai	Japan	27.97	
6	7	Grzegorz Polkowski	Poland	28.18	
7	1	Yunerki Ortega	Cuba	28.34	

=== Final ===
Competed at 19:25.

Rank	Lane	Name	Nationality	Time	Notes
1st place, gold medalist(s)	4	Yang Bozun	China	25.27	WR
2nd place, silver medalist(s)	5	Bradley Snyder	United States	25.93	AM
3rd place, bronze medalist(s)	7	Enhamed Enhamed	Spain	26.37	
4	6	Alexander Chekurov	Russia	26.38	
5	2	Keiichi Kimura	Japan	26.84	
6	1	Viktor Smyrnov	Ukraine	27.03	
7	3	Hendri Herbst	South Africa	27.57	
8	8	Rustam Nurmukhametov	Russia	28.15	

Q = qualified for final. WR = World Record. AM = Americas Record. AF = African Record.
