= Xia Jiangbo =

Chinese Paralympic swimmer

Personal information
- Born: September 1, 1989 (age 36)
Medal record
Women's para swimming (S3)
Representing China
Paralympic Games
Gold medal – first place	2012 London	50 m freestyle S3
Gold medal – first place	2012 London	100 m freestyle S3
Bronze medal – third place	2008 Beijing	50 m backstroke S3
IPC World Championships
Gold medal – first place	2010 Eindhoven	50 m breastroke SB2
Gold medal – first place	2010 Eindhoven	4x50 m medley 20pts

Xia Jiangbo (born September 1, 1989) is a Chinese swimmer. At the 2012 Summer Paralympics she won 2 gold medals.
