= Swimming at the 2012 Summer Paralympics – Women's 100 metre breaststroke SB9 =

Women's 100m Breaststroke SB9 at the XIV Paralympic Games
- Venue: London Aquatics Centre
- Dates: 8 September
- Competitors: 13 from 10 nations
- Winning time: 1:17.81

Medalists
1st place, gold medalist(s)		Khrystyna Yurchenko	Ukraine
2nd place, silver medalist(s)		Sophie Pascoe	New Zealand
3rd place, bronze medalist(s)		Harriet Lee	Great Britain

The women's 100m breaststroke SB9 event at the 2012 Summer Paralympics took place at the London Aquatics Centre on 8 September. There were two heats; the swimmers with the eight fastest times advanced to the final.

== Results ==
=== Heats ===
Competed from 09:41.

==== Heat 1 ====
Rank	Lane	Name	Nationality	Time	Notes
1	5	Sophie Pascoe	New Zealand	1:19.28	Q, OC
2	4	Harriet Lee	Great Britain	1:19.44	Q, EU
3	6	Nina Ryabova	Russia	1:22.47	Q
4	2	Ellen Keane	Ireland	1:22.97	
5	3	Louise Watkin	Great Britain	1:25.48	
6	7	Irina Grazhdanova	Russia	1:26.85	

==== Heat 2 ====
Rank	Lane	Name	Nationality	Time	Notes
1	4	Khrystyna Yurchenko	Ukraine	1:18.61	Q, EU
2	3	Mariya Timofeyeva	Ukraine	1:20.45	Q
3	6	Zhang Meng	China	1:22.48	Q
4	2	Daniela Gimenez	Argentina	1:22.58	Q
5	5	Sarai Gascón Moreno	Spain	1:22.61	Q
6	7	Katherine Downie	Australia	1:27.41	
7	1	Aurelie Rivard	Canada	1:28.54	

=== Final ===
Competed at 17:37.

Rank	Lane	Name	Nationality	Time	Notes
1st place, gold medalist(s)	4	Khrystyna Yurchenko	Ukraine	1:17.81	EU
2nd place, silver medalist(s)	5	Sophie Pascoe	New Zealand	1:18.38	OC
3rd place, bronze medalist(s)	3	Harriet Lee	Great Britain	1:19.53	
4	2	Nina Ryabova	Russia	1:19.67	
5	6	Mariya Timofeyeva	Ukraine	1:20.92	
6	8	Sarai Gascón Moreno	Spain	1:21.50	
7	1	Daniela Gimenez	Argentina	1:21.99	
8	7	Zhang Meng	China	1:23.11	

'Q = qualified for final. EU = European Record. OC = Oceania Record.
