= Swimming at the 2012 Summer Paralympics – Women's 100 metre freestyle S5 =

Women's 100 metre freestyle S5 at the XIV Paralympic Games
- Venue: London Aquatics Centre
- Dates: 8 September
- Competitors: 11 from 10 nations

Medalists
1st place, gold medalist(s)		Teresa Perales	Spain
2nd place, silver medalist(s)		Nataliia Prologaieva	Ukraine
3rd place, bronze medalist(s)		Inbal Pezaro	Israel

The women's 100 metre freestyle S5 event at the 2012 Paralympic Games took place on 8 September, at the London Aquatics Centre.

Two heats were held, one with six swimmers and one with five swimmers. The swimmers with the eight fastest times advanced to the final.

== Heats ==
=== Heat 1 ===
Rank	Lane	Name	Nationality	Time	Notes
1	4	Sarah Louise Rung	Norway	1:23.98	Q
2	5	Inbal Pezaro	Israel	1:25.91	Q
3	6	Viktoriia Savtsova	Ukraine	1:26.90	Q
4	3	Joana Maria Silva	Brazil	1:28.90	Q
5	2	Simone Fragoso	Portugal	1:41.56	

=== Heat 2 ===
Rank	Lane	Name	Nationality	Time	Notes
1	5	Nataliia Prologaieva	Ukraine	1:20.62	Q
2	4	Teresa Perales	Spain	1:23.39	Q
3	3	Anita Fatis	France	1:25.05	Q
4	7	Katalin Engelhardt	Hungary	1:36.23	Q
5	2	Alyssa Gialamas	United States	1:40.23	
6	6	Rui Si Theresa Goh	Singapore	1:45.78	

== Final ==
Rank	Lane	Name	Nationality	Time	Notes
1st place, gold medalist(s)	5	Teresa Perales	Spain	1:18.55	
2nd place, silver medalist(s)	4	Nataliia Prologaieva	Ukraine	1:20.57	
3rd place, bronze medalist(s)	2	Inbal Pezaro	Israel	1:22.56	
4	3	Sarah Louise Rung	Norway	1:23.15	
5	6	Anita Fatis	France	1:24.34	
6	7	Viktoriia Savtsova	Ukraine	1:26.82	
7	1	Joana Maria Silva	Brazil	1:29.28	
8	8	Katalin Engelhardt	Hungary	1:36.91	
