= Swimming at the 2012 Summer Paralympics – Men's 50 metre backstroke S1 =

Event at the 2012 Summer Paralympics

Men's 50m Backstroke S1 at the XIV Paralympic Games
- Venue: London Aquatics Centre
- Dates: 6 September 2012
- Competitors: 7 from 4 nations
- Winning time: 1:04.29

Medalists
1st place, gold medalist(s)		Hennadii Boiko	Ukraine
2nd place, silver medalist(s)		Christos Tampaxis	Greece
3rd place, bronze medalist(s)		Oleksandr Golovko	Ukraine

The men's 50m backstroke S1 event at the 2012 Summer Paralympics took place at the London Aquatics Centre on 6 September. There were no heats in this event.

== Results ==
=== Final ===
Competed at 19:50.

Rank	Lane	Name	Nationality	Time	Notes
1st place, gold medalist(s)	4	Hennadii Boiko	Ukraine	1:04.29	WR
2nd place, silver medalist(s)	5	Christos Tampaxis	Greece	1:20.76	
3rd place, bronze medalist(s)	6	Oleksandr Golovko	Ukraine	1:32.44	
4	3	João Martins	Portugal	1:38.96	
5	2	Luis Eduardo Rojas Osorno	Colombia	1:48.93	
6	1	Alex Taxildaris	Greece	1:49.23	
7	7	Andreas Katsaros	Greece	1:59.44	

Q = qualified for final. WR = World Record.
