= Swimming at the 2016 Summer Paralympics – Men's 100 metre backstroke S7 =

Men's 100 metre backstroke S7 at the XV Paralympic Games
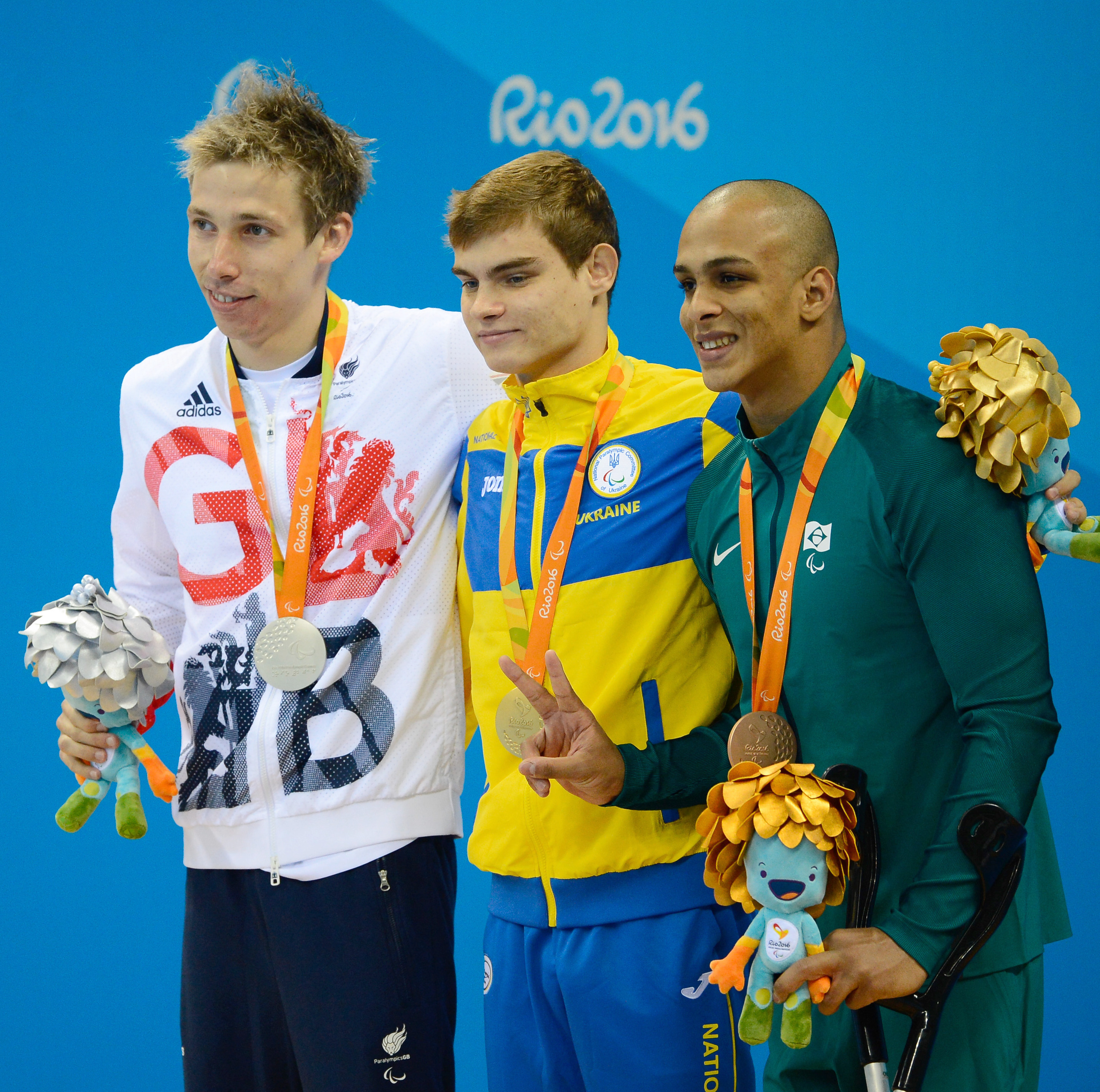
- Jonathan Fox (silver), Ievgenii Bogodaiko (gold), Italo Pereira (bronze)
- Venue: Olympic Aquatics Stadium
- Dates: 8 September 2016
- Competitors: 10 from 8 nations

Medalists
1st place, gold medalist(s)		Ievgenii Bogodaiko	Ukraine
2nd place, silver medalist(s)		Jonathan Fox	Great Britain
3rd place, bronze medalist(s)		Italo Pereira	Brazil

The men's 100 metre backstroke S7 event at the 2016 Paralympic Games took place on 8 September, at the Olympic Aquatics Stadium.

Two heats were held, each with five swimmers. The swimmers with the eight fastest times advanced to the final.

== Records ==
Prior to the competition, the existing World and Paralympic records were as follows.

World record	Jonathan Fox (GBR)	1:09.15	Sheffield, Great Britain	27 July 2016
Paralympic record	Jonathan Fox (GBR)	1:09.86	London, Great Britain	30 August 2012
2016 World leading	Jonathan Fox (GBR)	1:09.15	Sheffield, Great Britain	27 July 2016

== Heats ==
=== Heat 1 ===
Rank	Lane	Name	Nationality	Time	Notes
	2	Antoni Ponce Bertran	Spain		
	3	Dino Sinovcic	Croatia		
	4	Italo Pereira	Brazil		
	5	Marian Kvasnytsia	Ukraine		
	6	Guillermo Marro	Argentina		

=== Heat 2 ===
Rank	Lane	Name	Nationality	Time	Notes
	2	Hannes Schuermann	Germany		
	3	Matias de Andrade	Argentina		
	4	Jonathan Fox	Great Britain		
	5	Ievgenii Bogodaiko	Ukraine		
	6	Gao Nan	China		
