= Swimming at the 2012 Summer Paralympics – Women's 100 metre butterfly S8 =

Women's 100m Butterfly S8 at the XIV Paralympic Games
- Venue: London Aquatics Centre
- Dates: 30 August
- Competitors: 15 from 10 nations
- Winning time: 1:10.32

Medalists
| 1st place, gold medalist(s) | | Jessica Long | United States |
| 2nd place, silver medalist(s) | | Kateryna Istomina | Ukraine |
| 3rd place, bronze medalist(s) | | Jiang Shengnan | China |

The women's 100m butterfly S8 event at the 2012 Summer Paralympics took place at the London Aquatics Centre on 30 August. There were two heats; the swimmers with the eight fastest times advanced to the final.

== Results ==
=== Heats ===
Competed from 10:31.

==== Heat 1 ====
| Rank | Lane | Name | Nationality | Time | Notes |
|---|---|---|---|---|---|
| 1 | 3 | Jiang Shengnan | China | 1:15.24 | Q |
| 2 | 4 | Chen Zhonglan | China | 1:15.48 | Q |
| 3 | 5 | Amanda Everlove | United States | 1:15.82 | Q |
| 4 | 2 | Morgan Bird | Canada | 1:21.58 | |
| 5 | 7 | Ksenia Sogomonyan | Russia | 1:21.61 | |
| 6 | 6 | Manami Nomura | Japan | 1:22.00 | |
| 7 | 1 | Julia Kabus | Germany | 1:26.25 | |

==== Heat 2 ====
| Rank | Lane | Name | Nationality | Time | Notes |
|---|---|---|---|---|---|
| 1 | 5 | Kateryna Istomina | Ukraine | 1:11.04 | Q, PR |
| 2 | 4 | Jessica Long | United States | 1:11.14 | Q |
| 3 | 3 | Lu Weiyuan | China | 1:15.15 | Q |
| 4 | 2 | Maddison Elliott | Australia | 1:15.30 | Q, OC |
| 5 | 6 | Stefanie Weinberg | Germany | 1:19.54 | Q |
| 6 | 7 | Immacolata Cerasuolo | Italy | 1:23.21 | |
| 7 | 1 | Amalie Vinther | Denmark | 1:23.74 | |
| 8 | 8 | Camille Bérubé | Canada | 1:39.53 | |

=== Final ===
Competed at 18:30.

| Rank | Lane | Name | Nationality | Time | Notes |
|---|---|---|---|---|---|
| 1st place, gold medalist(s) | 5 | Jessica Long | United States | 1:10.32 | PR |
| 2nd place, silver medalist(s) | 4 | Kateryna Istomina | Ukraine | 1:11.53 | |
| 3rd place, bronze medalist(s) | 6 | Jiang Shengnan | China | 1:13.28 | |
| 4 | 7 | Chen Zhonglan | China | 1:14.53 | |
| 5 | 3 | Lu Weiyuan | China | 1:15.05 | |
| 6 | 2 | Maddison Elliott | Australia | 1:15.06 | OC |
| 7 | 8 | Stefanie Weinberg | Germany | 1:16.88 | |
| 8 | 1 | Amanda Everlove | United States | 1:18.56 | |

'Q = qualified for final. PR = Paralympic Record. OC = Oceania Record.
