= Swimming at the 2012 Summer Paralympics – Men's 100 metre breaststroke SB11 =

Event at the 2012 Summer Paralympics

Men's 100m Breaststroke SB11 at the XIV Paralympic Games
- Venue: London Aquatics Centre
- Dates: 3 September 2012
- Competitors: 13 from 10 nations
- Winning time: 1:10.11

Medalists
1st place, gold medalist(s)		Yang Bozun	China
2nd place, silver medalist(s)		Keiichi Kimura	Japan
3rd place, bronze medalist(s)		Oleksandr Mashchenko	Ukraine

The men's 100m breaststroke SB11 event at the 2012 Summer Paralympics took place at the London Aquatics Centre on 3 September. There were two heats; the swimmers with the eight fastest times advanced to the final.

== Results ==
=== Heats ===
Competed from 10:46.

==== Heat 1 ====
Rank	Lane	Name	Nationality	Time	Notes
1	4	Yang Bozun	China	1:10.65	Q, AS
2	5	Keiichi Kimura	Japan	1:15.94	Q
3	3	Panom Lagsanaprim	Thailand	1:21.40	Q
4	6	Yunerki Ortega	Cuba	1:21.52	Q
5	7	Bradley Snyder	United States	1:21.97	Q
6	2	Leider Alveiro Lemus Rojas	Colombia	1:23.45	

==== Heat 2 ====
Rank	Lane	Name	Nationality	Time	Notes
1	4	Oleksandr Mashchenko	Ukraine	1:16.27	Q
2	3	Israel Oliver	Spain	1:17.02	Q
3	5	Viktor Smyrnov	Ukraine	1:17.78	Q
4	6	Marcin Ryszka	Poland	1:22.23	
5	2	Brayan Mauricio Urbano Herrera	Colombia	1:23.81	
6	7	Dmytro Zalevskyy	Ukraine	1:25.53	
7	1	Nika Tvauri	Georgia	1:28.37	

=== Final ===
Competed at 18:37.

Rank	Lane	Name	Nationality	Time	Notes
1st place, gold medalist(s)	4	Yang Bozun	China	1:10.11	WR
2nd place, silver medalist(s)	5	Keiichi Kimura	Japan	1:14.00	
3rd place, bronze medalist(s)	3	Oleksandr Mashchenko	Ukraine	1:14.43	
4	2	Viktor Smyrnov	Ukraine	1:14.75	
5	6	Israel Oliver	Spain	1:16.46	
6	8	Bradley Snyder	United States	1:19.48	
7	7	Panom Lagsanaprim	Thailand	1:20.25	
8	1	Yunerki Ortega	Cuba	1:22.26	

Q = qualified for final. WR = World Record. AS = Asian Record.
