= 2013 IPC Swimming World Championships – Men's 50 metre butterfly =

The men's 50 metre butterfly at the 2013 IPC Swimming World Championships was held at the Parc Jean Drapeau Aquatic Complex in Montreal from 12–18 August.

== Medalists ==
Class	Gold	Silver	Bronze
S3	Dmytro Vynohradets; Ukraine	Mikael Fredriksson; Sweden	Ioannis Kostakis; Greece
S4	Darko Đurić; Slovenia	Arnost Petracek; Czech Republic	Gustavo Sanchez Martinez; Mexico
S5	Roy Perkins; United States	Daniel Dias; Brazil	Andrew Mullen; United Kingdom
S6	Zheng Tao; China	Xu Qing; China	Nelson Crispín; Colombia
S7	Yevheniy Bohodayko; Ukraine	Pan Shiyun; China	Wang Jingang; China

== See also ==
- List of IPC world records in swimming
