= Nataliia Prologaieva =

Ukrainian Paralympic swimmer

Personal information
- Born: 17 February 1981 (age 45)

Sport
- Country: Ukraine
- Sport: Paralympic swimming
Medal record
Women's para swimming
Representing Ukraine
Paralympic Games
Gold medal – first place	2012 London	50 m freestyle S5
Gold medal – first place	2012 London	100 m breaststroke SB4
Gold medal – first place	2012 London	200 m medley SM5
Silver medal – second place	2012 London	100 m freestyle S5
World Championships
Gold medal – first place	2010 Eindhoven	50 m freestyle S5
Gold medal – first place	2010 Eindhoven	50 m backstroke S5
Gold medal – first place	2010 Eindhoven	200 m medley SM5
Gold medal – first place	2010 Eindhoven	4x50 m freestyle 20pts
Gold medal – first place	2013 Montreal	50 m backstroke S5
Gold medal – first place	2013 Montreal	100 m freestyle S5
Gold medal – first place	2013 Montreal	4x50 m medley 20pts
Gold medal – first place	2013 Montreal	4x50 m freestyle 20pts
Silver medal – second place	2010 Eindhoven	4x50 m medley 20pts
Silver medal – second place	2013 Montreal	100 m breaststroke SB4
Silver medal – second place	2013 Montreal	50 m freestyle S5
European Championships
Gold medal – first place	2009 Reykjavik	4x50 m medley 20pts
Gold medal – first place	2009 Reykjavik	50 m freestyle S5

Nataliia Prologaieva (Ukrainian: Наталія Прологаєва, born 17 February 1981), also known as Nataliia Ziani (Наталія Зіяні), is a Ukrainian Paralympic swimmer who won gold at the 2012 Summer Paralympics in the women's 100 metre breaststroke SB4 and women's 200 metre individual medley SM5 events.
