= Harriet Lee (swimmer) =

British Paralympic swimmer (born 1991)

Personal information
- Full name: Harriet Lee
- Nationality: British
- Born: 6 May 1991 (age 35) Huntingdon, England

Sport
- Sport: Swimming
- Club: City of Peterborough Swimming Club
Medal record
Women's swimming
Representing Great Britain
Paralympics
Bronze medal – third place	2012 London	100 metres breastroke - SB9
Silver medal – second place	2016 Rio	100 metres breastroke - SB9
IPC World Championships
Gold medal – first place	2010 Eindhoven	100m breaststroke SB9
Gold medal – first place	2016 Funchal	100m medley relay 34pts
Silver medal – second place	2010 Eindhoven	4x100m medley relay 34pts
Silver medal – second place	2013 Montreal	100m breaststroke SB9
IPC Swimming European Championships
Silver medal – second place	2016 Funchal	100 m breaststroke SB9 Medal gold 34pt 4x100m medley relay

Harriet Lee (born 6 May 1991) is a British Paralympic swimmer who represented Great Britain at the 2012 Summer Paralympics.

== Personal life ==
Lee was born in Huntingdon, England and has been swimming since she was a baby and competing since 2002. She has Beckwith-wiedemann syndrome meaning the left side of her body is shorter than her right. She also struggles to control her blood sugar levels.

== Career ==
Lee first represented Great Britain in 2010 at the World championships in the Netherlands where she won silver in the women's 4x100 individual medley 34-point relay and gold in the 100m Breaststroke SB9. Although selected Harriet missed out on competing at the European championship in 2011 through illness.

In the 2012 British Championships in London, she won a gold medal in the 100m Breaststroke SB9 competition and on 8 September 2012 at the 2012 Paralympics she won a bronze medal in the same event having broken the European record in the heats with a time of 1min 19.44 secs. Only four months before the event she had been in intensive care in hospital.

In the 2016 Olympics, held in Rio de Janeiro, Brazil, Lee received her second silver medal. On 8 September 2016 she received the silver medal in the 100m Breaststroke SB9 with a time of 1 min 16.87 secs.
