= Oleksandr Golovko =

Ukrainian paralympic swimmer

Personal information
- Born: 26 June 1972 (age 54)

Sport
- Country: Ukraine
- Sport: Swimming
Medal record
Representing Ukraine
Paralympic Games
Swimming
Bronze medal – third place	2012 London	Men's 50 metre backstroke S1

Oleksandr Golovko (Ukrainian: Олександр Миколайович Головко, born 26 June 1972) is a Ukrainian paralympic swimmer. He competed in the Swimming at the 2012 Summer Paralympics, winning the bronze medal in the men's 50 metre backstroke S1. Golovko also competed at the 2016 Summer Paralympics, finishing in fifth place in the Men's 100m Backstroke S1.
