= Lorena Homar López =

Spanish Paralympic swimmer

Personal information
- Nationality: Spanish
- Born: 25 May 1991
- Home town: Palma de Mallorca

Sport
- Country: Spain
- Sport: Swimming

Lorena Homar López is an SM5 classified Spanish swimmer who has represented Spain at the 2012 Summer Paralympics.

== Personal ==
When Homar was four years old, both of her legs were amputated because of complications related to getting meningitis.

== Swimming ==
Homar is an SM5 classified swimmer. She started swimming when she was four years old.

In 2007, Homar competed at the IDM German Open. Eindhoven, Netherlands hosted the 2010 IPC World Swimming Championships at which she competed. Failing to make the finals, she finished tenth in 100 meter breaststroke. In another event at the Worlds, she won a bronze in a 200-meter medley race with a time of 4'13"71. She was one of four Spanish swimmers at the World Championships that were affiliated with CTEIB, an institute created by the Government of the Balearic Islands intended to provide an education to elite high-performance sportspeople. Homar set a minimum Spanish qualifying time for the London Paralympic Games at the Son Hugo Municipal Swimming Pool in February 2012. She competed at the 2012 Spanish National Championships. That year, she was coached by Toni Pomar, and trained with Xavi Torres, Esther Morales Fernández and Alejandro Sánchez. She competed at the 2012 Summer Paralympics, and had a seventh-place finish in a 200-meter freestyle race with a time of 4'03"16. In 2013, she competed in the Championship of Spain by Autonomous Open Paralympic Swimming, where she represented the Balearic Islands.
