= Pan Shiyun =

Chinese Paralympic swimmer

Personal information
- Born: April 20, 1989 (age 37)
Medal record
Swimming (S7)
Representing China
Paralympic Games
Gold medal – first place	2016 Rio de Janeiro	Men's 50 metre freestyle S7
Gold medal – first place	2016 Rio de Janeiro	Men's 50 metre butterfly S7
Gold medal – first place	2012 London	Men's 100 metre freestyle S7
Gold medal – first place	2012 London	Men's 50 metre butterfly S7
Silver medal – second place	2012 London	Men's 50 metre freestyle S7
Silver medal – second place	2012 London	Men's 400 metre freestyle S7
IPC World Championships
Gold medal – first place	2015 Glasgow	100 m freestyle S7
Gold medal – first place	2015 Glasgow	50 m butterfly S7
Silver medal – second place	2013 Montreal	50 m butterfly S7

Pan Shiyun (born April 20, 1989) is a Chinese swimmer. He competes in the S7 categorisation. At age 11, he had an electrical accident that caused him to lose the use of his right arm.

At the 2012 Summer Paralympics, Shiyun won two gold medals and two silver medals.

Shiyun won a further two gold medals at the 2016 Summer Paralympics. He took gold in the 50m freestyle event in a world record time, before also winning the 50m butterfly, breaking his own world record set the previous year.
