= Iryna Sotska =

Ukrainian Paralympic swimmer

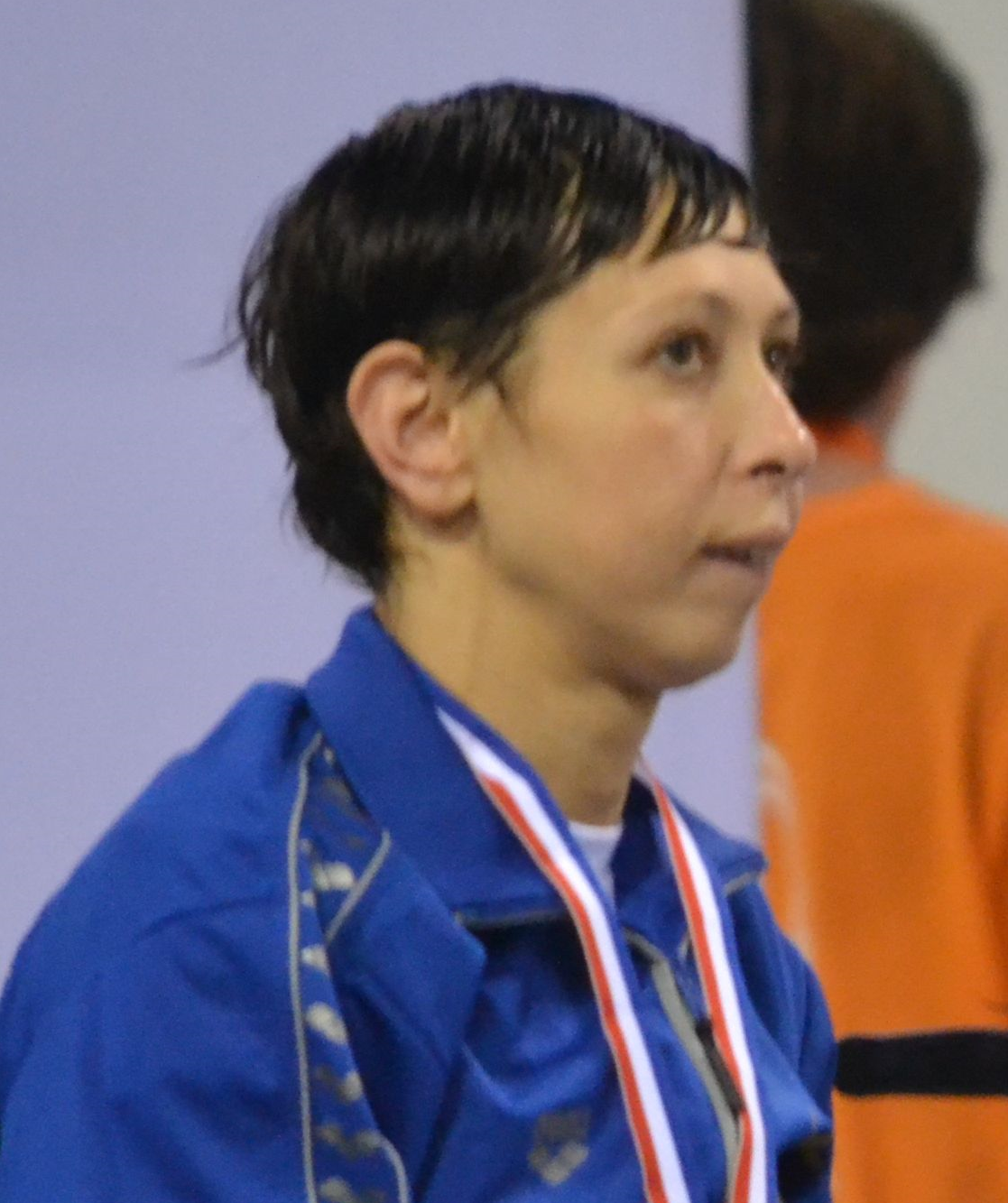
- Sotska after receiving one of her medals at the 2014 IPC Swimming European Championships

Personal information
- Nationality: Ukrainian
- Born: 4 September 1979 (age 46) Sloviansk, Ukraine

Sport
- Sport: Swimming
- Strokes: Freestyle, backstroke
- Club: Donetsk Regional Adaptive Sports School
- Coach: Andrey Kaznacheyev
Medal record
Event	1st	2nd	3rd
Paralympic Games	0	1	3
World Championships	1	5	2
European Championships	1	3	4
Swimming
Representing Ukraine
Paralympic Games
Silver medal – second place	2008 Beijing	50 metre backstroke - S2
Bronze medal – third place	2012 London	50 metre backstroke - S2
Bronze medal – third place	2016 Rio de Janeiro	50 metre backstroke - S2
Bronze medal – third place	2016 Rio de Janeiro	100 metre backstroke - S2
IPC World Championships
Gold medal – first place	2015 Glasgow	100 m backstroke S2
Silver medal – second place	2010 Eindhoven	50 m freestyle S2
Silver medal – second place	2010 Eindhoven	200 m freestyle S2
Silver medal – second place	2013 Montreal	50 m backstroke S2
Silver medal – second place	2013 Montreal	100 m freestyle S2
Silver medal – second place	2015 Glasgow	50 m backstroke S2
Bronze medal – third place	2010 Eindhoven	50 m backstroke S2
Bronze medal – third place	2010 Eindhoven	100m freestyle S2
IPC European Championships
Gold medal – first place	2016 Funchal	100 m backstroke S2
Silver medal – second place	2009 Reykjavik	100 m freestyle S2
Bronze medal – third place	2009 Reykjavik	50 m freestyle S2
Silver medal – second place	2009 Reykjavik	50 m backstroke S2
Silver medal – second place	2014 Eindhoven	100 m backstroke S2
Bronze medal – third place	2014 Eindhoven	50 m backstroke S2
Bronze medal – third place	2016 Funchal	50 m freestyle S2
Bronze medal – third place	2016 Funchal	50 m backstroke S2

Iryna Sotska (born 4 September 1979) is a Paralympic swimmer from Ukraine competing mainly in category S2 events.

Iryna competed as part of the Ukrainian team in the 2008 Summer Paralympics. She competed in the only event for her disability classification the 50 metres (160 ft) backstroke winning the silver medal under the old world record but behind team mate Ganna Ielisavetska and ahead of S1 class world record breaker Sara Carracelas García of Spain.
