= Vera Thamm =

German Paralympic swimmer

Personal information
- Born: 30 October 1990 (age 35) Haltern am See, Germany
- Height: 1.48 m (4 ft 10 in)

Sport
- Country: Germany
- Sport: Paralympic swimming
- Disability: Dysmelia
- Disability class: S3
- Club: TSV Bayer Leverkusen
- Coached by: Marion Haas-Faller
- Retired: 2016
Medal record
Paralympic swimming
Representing Germany
World Championships
Gold medal – first place	2013 Montreal	Women's 50m breaststroke SB2
Bronze medal – third place	2013 Montreal	Women's 50m butterfly S3
European Championships
Silver medal – second place	2011 Berlin	Women's 50m breaststroke SB2
Bronze medal – third place	2011 Berlin	Women's 150m individual medley SM3

Vera Thamm (born 30 October 1990) is a retired German Paralympic swimmer who competed in international level events. She was born without her lower arms and lower leg. She has represented Germany at the 2012 Summer Paralympics but did not medal in her three events.

Since her retirement from competitive swimming in 2016, she is a project manager of the German Disability Sports Federation in developing the promotion of full-time employment for people who have impairments in sports organisations.
