= Italo Pereira =

Brazilian paralympic swimmer

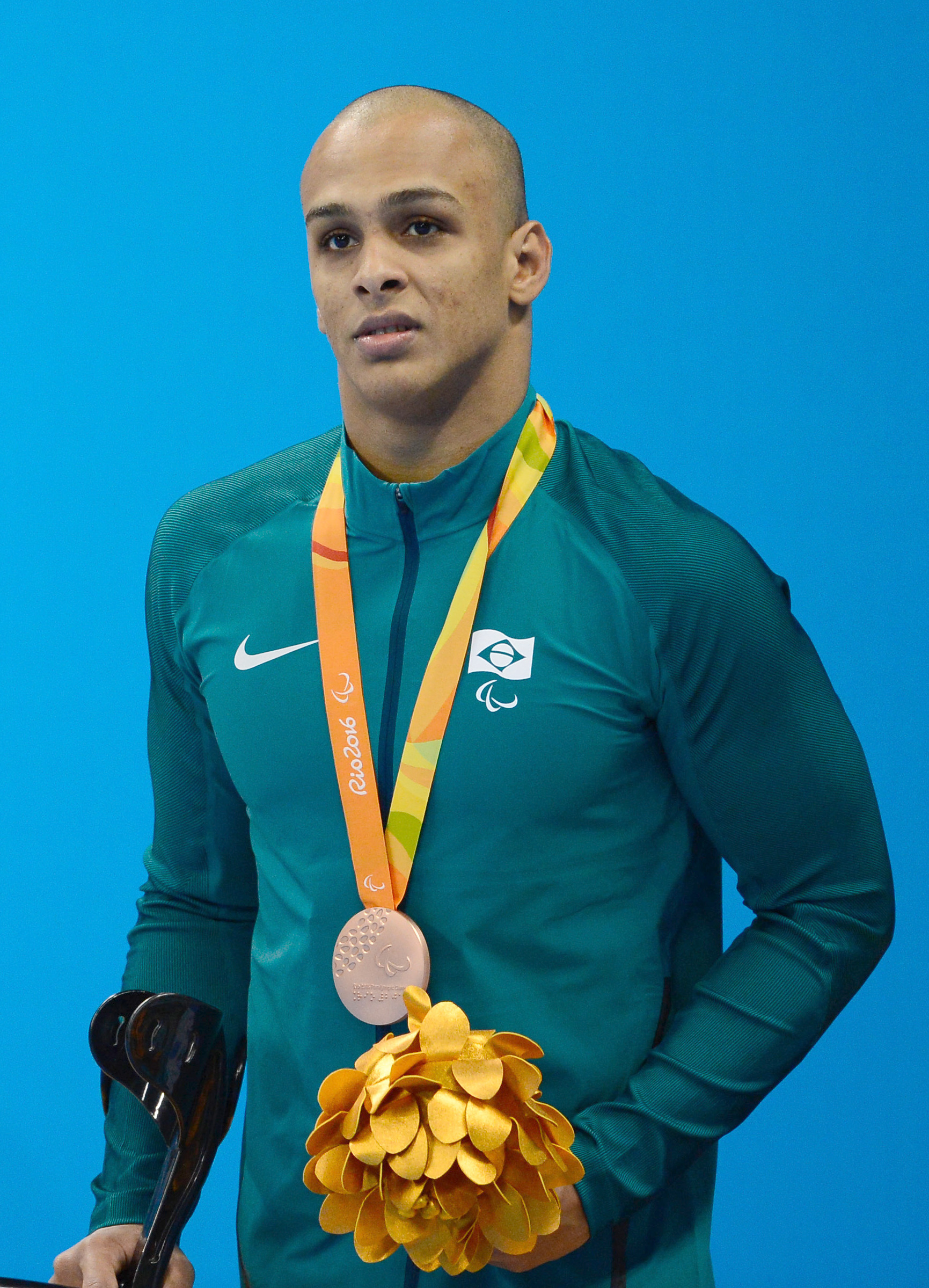
- Pereira in 2016

Sport
- Country: Brazil
- Sport: Swimming
Medal record
Representing Brazil
Paralympic Games
Swimming
Bronze medal – third place	2016 Rio de Janeiro	Men's 100 metre backstroke S7

Italo Pereira is a Brazilian paralympic swimmer. He participated at the 2016 Summer Paralympics in the swimming competition, being awarded the bronze medal in the men's 100 metre backstroke S7 event. Pereira also participated at the 2012 Summer Paralympics in the swimming competition.
