= Wang Jingang =

Chinese Paralympic swimmer

Personal information
- Born: March 16, 1991 (age 35) Pingdingshan, China

Sport
- Country: China
- Sport: Para swimming
- Disability class: S6
Medal record
Men's Paralympic swimming
Representing China
Summer Paralympics
Gold medal – first place	2020 Tokyo	50 m butterfly S6
Gold medal – first place	2024 Paris	50 m butterfly S6
Gold medal – first place	2024 Paris	Mixed 4×50 m medley relay 20pts
Silver medal – second place	2024 Paris	100 m backstroke S6
Bronze medal – third place	2012 London	50 m butterfly S7
Bronze medal – third place	2016 Rio de Janeiro	50 m butterfly S7
World Championships
Gold medal – first place	2019 London	50 m butterfly S6
Gold medal – first place	2019 London	Mixed 4x50 m freestyle relay 20pts
Gold medal – first place	2019 London	Mixed 4x50 m medley relay 20pts
Silver medal – second place	2013 Montreal	200 m medley SM7
Silver medal – second place	2019 London	200 m ind. medley SM6
Silver medal – second place	2023 Manchester	50 m butterfly S6
Bronze medal – third place	2013 Montreal	50 m butterfly S7
Bronze medal – third place	2015 Glasgow	50 m butterfly S7
Asian Para Games
Bronze medal – third place	2022 Hangzhou	100 m backstroke S6

Wang Jingang (born March 16, 1991) is a Chinese Paralympic swimmer who represented China in the Paralympic Games.

== Career ==
Jingang represented China in the men's 50 metre butterfly S6 event at the 2020 Summer Paralympics and won a gold medal.
