= Ievgenii Bogodaiko =

Ukrainian Paralympic swimmer (born 1994)

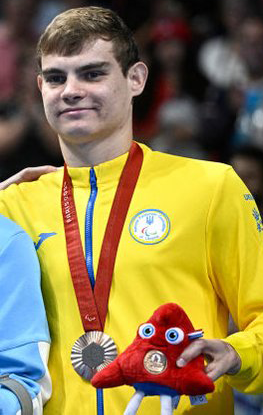
- Bogodaiko at the 2024 Summer Paralympics

Personal information
- Full name: Ievgenii Bogodaiko (Ukrainian: Євгеній Віталійович Богодайко)
- Nationality: Ukrainian
- Born: 27 April 1994 (age 32) Poltava, Ukraine

Sport
- Sport: Swimming
- Strokes: freestyle breaststroke backstroke butterfly
- Club: Invasport, Poltava
Medal record
Men's para swimming
Representing Ukraine
Paralympic Games
Gold medal – first place	2012 London	100m breaststroke SB6
Gold medal – first place	2012 London	200m ind. medley SM7
Gold medal – first place	2016 Rio de Janeiro	100m backstroke S7
Gold medal – first place	2016 Rio de Janeiro	100m breaststroke SB6
Gold medal – first place	2016 Rio de Janeiro	200m individual medley SM7
Gold medal – first place	2020 Tokyo	100m breaststroke SB6
Silver medal – second place	2012 London	100m backstroke S7
Silver medal – second place	2012 London	50m butterfly S7
Silver medal – second place	2016 Rio de Janeiro	50m freestyle S7
Silver medal – second place	2016 Rio de Janeiro	50m butterfly
Silver medal – second place	2016 Rio de Janeiro	4 × 100 metre medley relay 34pts
Bronze medal – third place	2016 Rio de Janeiro	Mixed ×50m freestyle relay 20pts
Bronze medal – third place	2016 Rio de Janeiro	100m freestyle S7
Bronze medal – third place	2020 Tokyo	50 m freestyle S7
Bronze medal – third place	2024 Paris	100 m breaststroke SB6
Bronze medal – third place	2024 Paris	200 m ind. medley SM7
World Championships
Gold medal – first place	2010 Eindhoven	100m backstroke S6
Gold medal – first place	2013 Montreal	100m breaststroke SB6
Gold medal – first place	2013 Montreal	50m butterfly S7
Gold medal – first place	2013 Montreal	4×50m medley relay 20pts
Gold medal – first place	2015 Glasgow	200m ind. medley SM7
Gold medal – first place	2015 Glasgow	100m breaststroke SB6
Silver medal – second place	2010 Eindhoven	100m breaststroke SB6
Silver medal – second place	2010 Eindhoven	4×50m medley - 20pts
Silver medal – second place	2010 Eindhoven	4×50m freestyle - 20pts
Silver medal – second place	2013 Montreal	4×50m freestyle relay 20pts
Silver medal – second place	2015 Glasgow	50m freestyle S6
Silver medal – second place	2019 London	50m butterfly S7
Silver medal – second place	2019 London	100m breaststroke SB6
Bronze medal – third place	2010 Eindhoven	400m freestyle S6
Bronze medal – third place	2010 Eindhoven	50m butterfly S6
Bronze medal – third place	2013 Montreal	100m backstroke S7
Bronze medal – third place	2013 Montreal	50m freestyle S7
Bronze medal – third place	2013 Montreal	100m freestyle S7
Bronze medal – third place	2015 Glasgow	4×100m medley relay 34pts
Bronze medal – third place	2019 London	50m freestyle S7
European Championships
Gold medal – first place	2009 Reykjavik	100m backstroke S6
Gold medal – first place	2014 Eindhoven	50m freestyle – S7
Gold medal – first place	2014 Eindhoven	100m freestyle – S7
Gold medal – first place	2014 Eindhoven	100m breaststroke – SB6
Gold medal – first place	2014 Eindhoven	200m medley – SM7
Gold medal – first place	2014 Eindhoven	100m butterfly – S3
Gold medal – first place	2014 Eindhoven	4×50m medley relay 20pts
Gold medal – first place	2014 Eindhoven	4×50m freestyle relay 20pts
Gold medal – first place	2016 Funchal	50m freestyle S7
Gold medal – first place	2016 Funchal	100 m breaststroke – SB6
Gold medal – first place	2016 Funchal	200 m ind. medley SM7
Gold medal – first place	2016 Funchal	50 m butterfly – S7
Gold medal – first place	2024 Madeira	100 m breaststroke SB6
Gold medal – first place	2026 Kocaeli	100 m breaststroke SB6
Silver medal – second place	2009 Reykjavik	200m ind. medley SM6
Silver medal – second place	2014 Eindhoven	100m backstroke – S7
Silver medal – second place	2014 Eindhoven	4×100m freestyle relay 34pts
Silver medal – second place	2016 Funchal	4×100m medley relay 34pts
Bronze medal – third place	2016 Funchal	100 m backstroke – S7
Bronze medal – third place	2024 Madeira	200 m ind. medley SM7

Ievgenii Bogodaiko (born 27 April 1994) is a Paralympic swimmer from Ukraine competing mainly in category SB6 and S7 events.
