= Tobias Pollap =

German Paralympic swimmer

Personal information
- Born: 23 June 1986 (age 40) Hattingen, West Germany
- Height: 1.76 m (5 ft 9 in)
- Weight: 70 kg (154 lb)

Sport
- Country: Germany
- Sport: Paralympic swimming
- Disability: Hemiplegia
- Disability class: S7
Medal record
Paralympic swimming
Representing Germany
World Championships
Silver medal – second place	2017 Mexico City	100m freestyle S7
Bronze medal – third place	2017 Mexico City	50m freestyle S7
Bronze medal – third place	2017 Mexico City	50m butterfly S7
European Championships
Silver medal – second place	2011 Berlin	100m freestyle S7
Silver medal – second place	2016 Funchal	200m individual medley SM7
Bronze medal – third place	2011 Berlin	200m individual medley SM7
Bronze medal – third place	2014 Eindhoven	200m individual medley SM7
Bronze medal – third place	2016 Funchal	50m freestyle S7
Bronze medal – third place	2018 Dublin	50m butterfly S7
Bronze medal – third place	2018 Dublin	4x50m freestyle relay 20pts
Bronze medal – third place	2021 Funchal	100m breaststroke SB7

Tobias Pollap (born 23 June 1986) is a German Paralympic swimmer who competes in international elite competitions. He is a three-time World medalist and an eight-time European medalist. Tobias Pollap has also competed at the 2012 and 2016 Summer Paralympics.
