= 2018 World Para Swimming European Championships – Men's 50 metres freestyle =

The men's 50 metres freestyle at the 2018 World Para Swimming European Championships was held at the National Aquatic Centre in Dublin from 13 to 19 August. 11 classification finals are held in all over this event.

== Medalists ==
Event	Gold		Silver		Bronze	
S3	Vincenzo Boni (ITA)	47.04	Denys Ostapchenko (UKR)	50.05	Miguel Angel Martinez Tajuelo (ESP)	52.28
S4	Arnost Petracek (CZE); Darko Đurić (SLO)	40.40	no medal awarded		David Smetanine (FRA)	40.93
S5	Antonio Fantin (ITA)	31.18*	Francesco Bocciardo (ITA)	32.95	Stephan Fuhrer (SUI)	32.97
S6	Thijs van Hofweegen (NED)	30.59	Georgios Sfaltos (GRE)	31.67	Oleksandr Komarov (UKR)	31.88
S7	Andrii Trusov (UKR)	28.38	Ievgenii Bogodaiko (UKR)	28.48	Federico Becelli (ITA)	29.18
S8	Michal Golus (POL)	28.06	Joshua Grob (SUI)	28.43	Sergio Martos (ESP)	28.67
S9	Simone Barlaam (ITA)	25.00 WR	Iurii Bozhynskyi (UKR)	26.43	José Antonio Mari-Alcaraz (ESP)	26.50
S10	Maksym Krypak (UKR)	23.54	Denys Dubrov (UKR)	23.84	Stefano Raimondi (ITA)	24.45
S11	Hryhory Zudzilau (BLR)	27.01	Viktor Smyrnov (UKR)	27.40	Wojciech Makowski (POL)	27.97
S12	Illia Yaremenko (UKR)	23.64	Iaroslav Denysenko (UKR)	23.73	Maksym Veraksa (UKR)	24.06
S13	Ihar Boki (BLR)	23.77	Kyrylo Garashchenko (UKR)	24.61	Kamil Rzetelski (POL)	25.61
WR world record | AR area record | CR championship record | GR games record | NR national record | OR Olympic record | PB personal best | SB season best | WL world leading (in a given season)

* Fantin swam a WR 31.16 in the heats.

== See also ==
- List of IPC world records in swimming
