= 2018 World Para Swimming European Championships – Women's 50 metres breaststroke =

The women's 50 metres breaststroke at the 2018 World Para Swimming European Championships was held at the National Aquatic Centre in Dublin from 13 to 19 August. A single classification final was held in all over this event.

== Medalists ==
| Event | Gold | | Silver | | Bronze | |
|---|---|---|---|---|---|---|
| SB3 | Arjola Trimi (ITA) | 1:04.48 | Dominika Mickova (CZE) | 1:07.89 | Olga Sviderska (UKR) | 1:12.23 |
WR world record | AR area record | CR championship record | GR games record | NR national record | OR Olympic record | PB personal best | SB season best | WL world leading (in a given season)

== See also ==
- List of IPC world records in swimming
