= Eskender Mustafaiev =

Ukrainian Paralympic swimmer

Personal information
- Full name: Eskender Ametovich Mustafaiev
- Born: 17 July 1981 (age 44) Chinaz, Tashkent Oblast, Uzbek SSR, Soviet Union

Sport
- Sport: Swimming
- Strokes: Freestyle, medley
- Club: Крымцентр "Инваспорт"
Medal record
Men's para swimming
Representing Ukraine
Paralympic Games
Gold medal – first place	2012 London	50 metre freestyle S4
IPC World Championships
Gold medal – first place	2013 Montreal	50 m freestyle S4
Gold medal – first place	2013 Montreal	4 × 50 m medley 20pts
Silver medal – second place	2013 Montreal	100 m freestyle S4
Silver medal – second place	2013 Montreal	4 × 50 m freestyle 20pts
Representing Russia
IPC World Championships
Gold medal – first place	2015 Glasgow	50 m freestyle S4
Bronze medal – third place	2015 Glasgow	4 × 50 m freestyle 20pts

Eskender Ametovich Mustafaiev (Russian: Эскендер Аметович Мустафаев, Ukrainian: Ескендер Аметович Мустафаєв, also transliterated Mustafayev or Mustafaev; born July 17, 1981) is a paralympic swimmer. He competed for Ukraine at the 2012 Summer Paralympics, winning gold in the 50 metre freestyle S4, and at the 2013 IPC Swimming World Championships, winning two gold and two silver medals. Mustafaiev competed for Russia at the 2015 IPC Swimming World Championships, winning gold and bronze medals.

== Personal ==
Mustafaiev was born in Chinaz, Tashkent Region, Uzbek SSR, Soviet Union. He is from Aqyar/Sevastopil, Ukraine. When he was five years old, he was diagnosed with Charcot–Marie–Tooth disease. He is married and has a daughter with his wife Yulia. He was previously married to Ukrainian Paralympic shooter Olga Mustafaieva. He speaks Russian, and does not speak Ukrainian.

== Swimming ==
Mustafaiev started swimming in 2008 in Sevastopol, Ukraine as part of a rehabilitation regime for a weak back and hand. While he briefly looked at fencing, he committed to swimming because the issues with his hand made fencing difficult. In 2011, Mustafaiev made his national team debut and was a member of the Ukrainian delegation at the 2011 IPC European Swimming Championships in Berlin, Germany. He competed in the Men's 50m Freestyle S4.

Mustafaiev was one of three Ukrainian athletes competing at the 2012 Summer Paralympics from the Crimea region, with the other two including fellow swimmer Dmytro Kryzhanivskyi and shooter Olga Mustafaieva . At the 2012 London, 31-year-old Mustafaiev won gold in the 50 metre freestyle S4 event with a time of 38.26 seconds. He had several other events on his London swimming program including the 100m freestyle, 50m backstroke and 200m freestyle races in London. He finished eighth and last in the 50m backstroke final with a time of 52.51 seconds. This time was slower than the heats, where he swam a time of 51.92. Following the 2012 Games, he was awarded the Order of Merit for his sporting achievements.

In Montreal for the 2013 IPC Swimming World Championships, Mustafaiev claimed gold in the men's 50 freestyle S4 with a time of 37.96 seconds. He won a silver medal in the men's 100 freestyle S4, losing to Slovenia's Darko Đurić by half a third of a second with a time of 1:27.56 to Duric's 1:27.27.

In October 2014, Mustafaiev, two other Crimean Paralympic and Deaflympic swimmers and a Crimean Paralympic or Deaflympic coach lost their Ukrainian sports scholarship, awarded by a May 2013 presidential decree, followed the annexation of Crimea by the Russian Federation. Around this time, he also formally switched his nationality, and now represents Russia in international competitions.

Mustafaiev had to miss the 2014 IPC Swimming European Championships, and was unable to defend his world championship title. In 2015, he represented Russia at the IPC World Championships where he won a bronze in the 4 x 50m Freestyle Relay 20 Points. He failed to make it out of the heats in the 100m Freestyle S4 and the 50m Backstroke S4 events.
