= Clodoaldo Silva =

Brazilian Paralympic swimmer

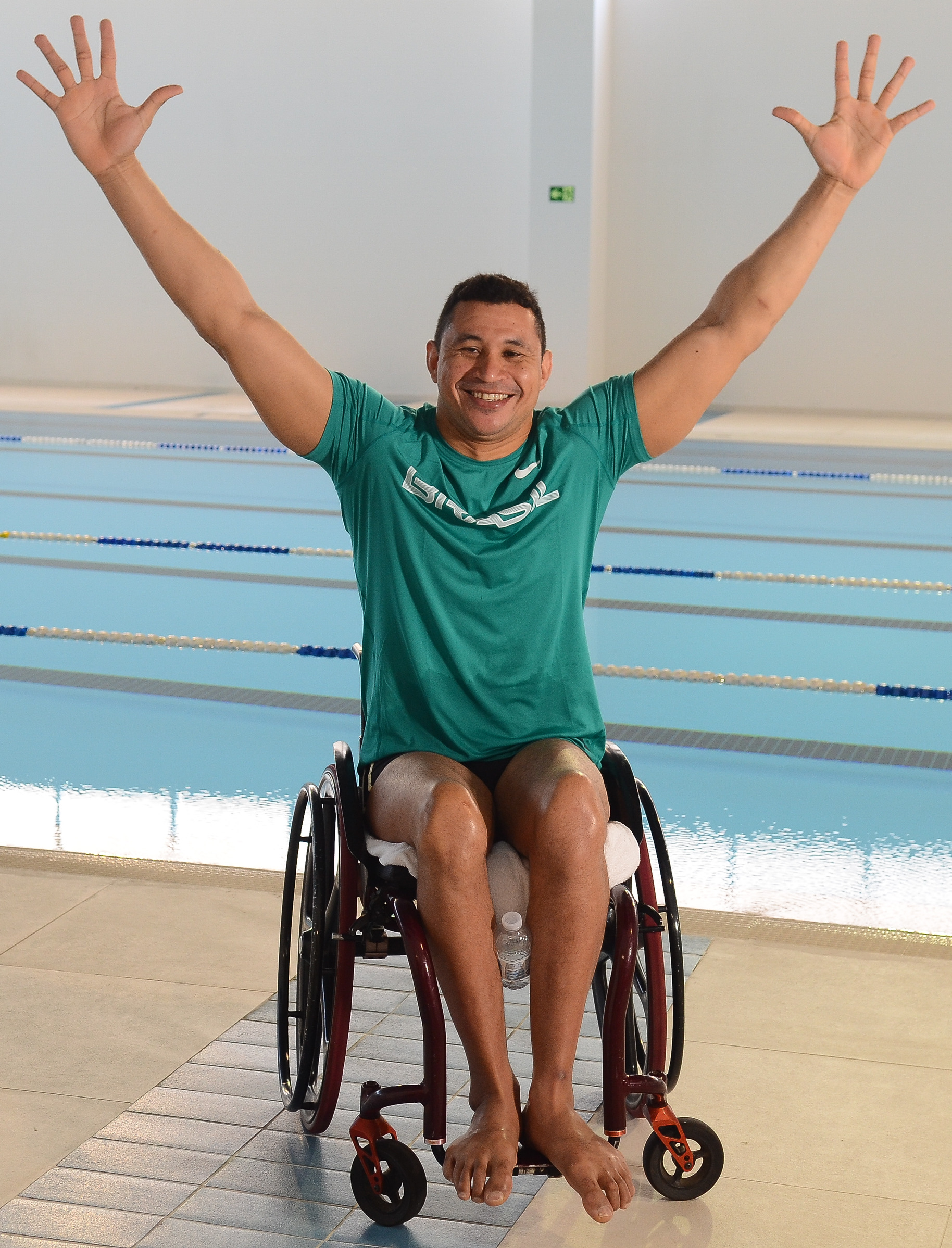
- Silva in 2016

Personal information
- Born: 1 February 1979 (age 47) Natal, Rio Grande do Norte, Brazil
- Height: 175 cm (5 ft 9 in)
- Weight: 64 kg (141 lb)

Sport
- Sport: Swimming
- Disability class: S5
- Club: Paraplegic Association Campinas
- Coached by: Leonardo Tomasello Araujo (national)
- Retired: 2016
Medal record
Representing Brazil
Paralympic Games
Gold medal – first place	2004 Athens	50 m freestyle S4
Gold medal – first place	2004 Athens	100 m freestyle S4
Gold medal – first place	2004 Athens	200 m freestyle S4
Gold medal – first place	2004 Athens	50 m butterfly S4
Gold medal – first place	2004 Athens	150 m ind. medley SM4
Gold medal – first place	2004 Athens	4×50 m medley 20 pts
Silver medal – second place	2000 Sydney	100 m freestyle
Silver medal – second place	2000 Sydney	4×50 m medley 20 pts
Silver medal – second place	2000 Sydney	4×50 m freestyle 20 pts
Silver medal – second place	2004 Athens	4×50 m freestyle 20 pts
Silver medal – second place	2016 Rio	Mixed 4×50 m freestyle 20 pts
Bronze medal – third place	2000 Sydney	50 m freestyle
Bronze medal – third place	2008 Beijing	4×50 m freestyle 20 pts
IPC Swimming World Championships
Gold medal – first place	2010 Eindhoven	4×50 m freestyle relay 20pts
Gold medal – first place	2013 Montreal	4×50 m freestyle relay 20pts
Gold medal – first place	2015 Glasgow	4×50 m mixed freestyle relay 20pts
Parapan American Games
Gold medal – first place	2003 Mar del Plata	50m freestyle S4
Gold medal – first place	2003 Mar del Plata	100m freestyle S4
Gold medal – first place	2003 Mar del Plata	200m freestyle S4
Gold medal – first place	2003 Mar del Plata	150m individual medley SM4
Gold medal – first place	2011 Guadalajara	4x50m freestyle relay
Gold medal – first place	2011 Guadalajara	4x50m medley relay
Silver medal – second place	2003 Mar del Plata	50m backstroke S4
Silver medal – second place	2011 Guadalajara	50m freestyle S5
Silver medal – second place	2011 Guadalajara	100m freestyle S5
Silver medal – second place	2011 Guadalajara	200m freestyle S5
Silver medal – second place	2011 Guadalajara	50m butterfly S5
Silver medal – second place	2015 Toronto	50m freestyle S5
Silver medal – second place	2015 Toronto	100m freestyle S5
Silver medal – second place	2015 Toronto	200m freestyle S5

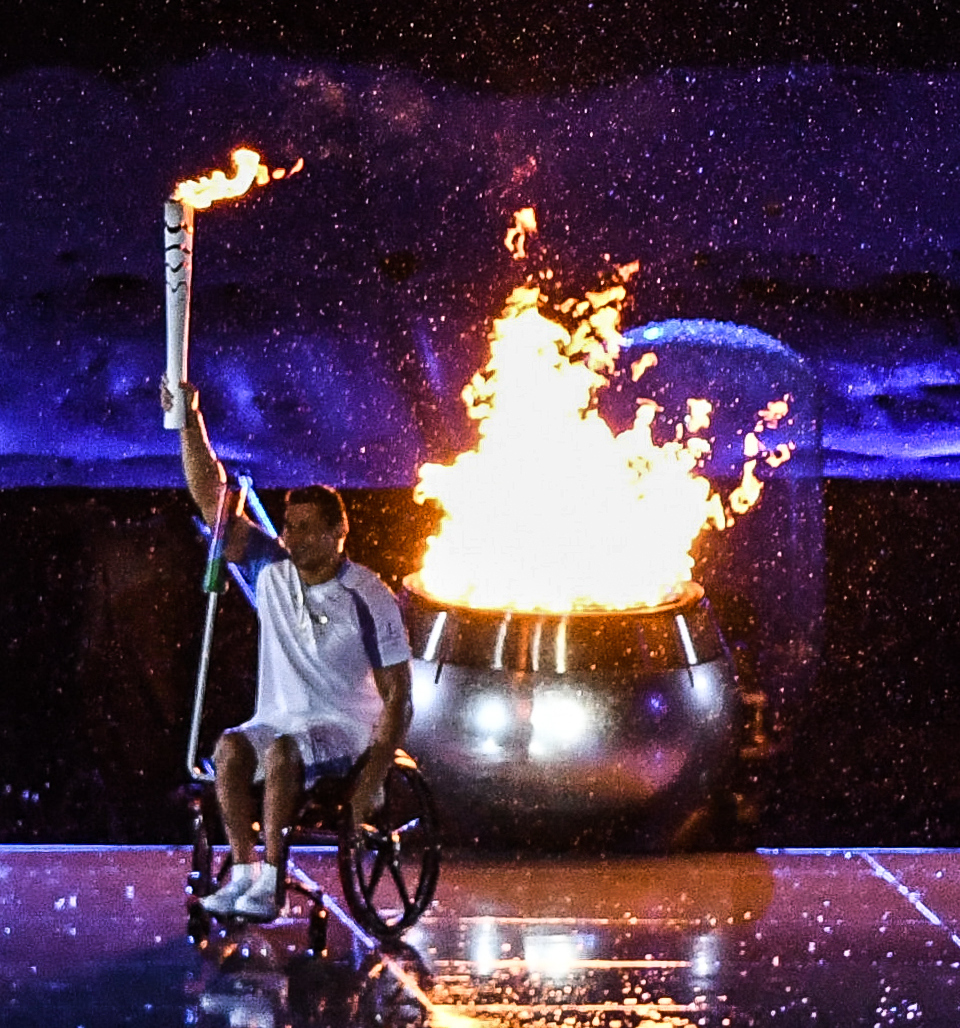
Silva after lighting the Paralympic cauldron at the 2016 Summer Paralympics opening ceremony

Clodoaldo Silva (born 1 February 1979) is a Brazilian Paralympic swimmer. He competed at the 2000 Summer Paralympics in Sydney, winning three silver medals and one bronze. He competed again at the 2004 Summer Paralympics in Athens, where he set four world records, five Paralympic records, and won six gold medals and one silver. He also represented Brazil at the 2008, 2012 and 2016 Paralympics, and lit the Paralympic cauldron at the 2016 Summer Paralympics opening ceremony.

In 2005, he was given the Best Male Athlete award by the International Paralympic Committee, the Best Female Athlete award going to Japan's Mayumi Narita.

Silva has cerebral palsy, and took up swimming in 1996 as part of his rehabilitation. He is married and has a daughter Anita.

At the 2016 Summer Paralympics he took a silver medal in the Mixed 4x50m Freestyle Relay. His teammates were Daniel Dias, Edenia Garcia, Susana Ribeiro, Talisson Glock, Maiara Regina Perreira Barreto, Joana Maria Silva and Patricia Pereira dos Santos. Silva was also the final torchbearer and lit the cauldron during the opening ceremony.
