= Anastasia Diodorova =

Russian Paralympic swimmer

Medal record

Swimming

Representing Russia

Paralympic Games
Silver medal – second place	2008 Beijing	50 metre butterfly S6

IPC World Championships
Gold medal – first place	2013 Montreal	100 m backstroke S6
Silver medal – second place	2010 Eindhoven	50 m butterfly S6
Silver medal – second place	2013 Montreal	50 m butterfly S6
Bronze medal – third place	2013 Montreal	4x50 m freestyle relay 20pts
Bronze medal – third place	2015 Glasgow	100 m backstroke S6

IPC European Championships
Gold medal – first place	2016 Funchal	100 m backstroke S6
Silver medal – second place	2009 Reykjavik	50 metre butterfly S6
Silver medal – second place	2009 Reykjavik	100 m backstroke S6
Bronze medal – third place	2014 Eindhoven	50 metre butterfly S6
Bronze medal – third place	2014 Eindhoven	4x50m mixed freestyle relay 20pts
Bronze medal – third place	2016 Funchal	Mixed 50m freestyle relay 20pts

Anastasia Diodorova (Russian: Анастасия Диодорова; born 7 January 1990) is a Paralympic swimmer from Russia competing mainly in category S6 events.

== Career ==
Anastasia competed in both the 2004 and 2008 Summer Paralympics winning a silver medal. In 2004, she competed in the 100m backstroke and 50m butterfly finishing fourth in the final of both events. In 2008, she finished fourth in the final of the 100m backstroke, eighth in the final of the 200m individual medley, in the 50m butterfly she won a silver medal behind Fuying Jiang of China who set a new world record but ahead of Ukraine's Olena Akopyan who had set a world record in the heats that Anastasia swam faster than in the final.
