= Kateryna Istomina =

Ukrainian Paralympic swimmer

Personal information
- Full name: Kateryna Istomina
- Nationality: Ukrainian
- Born: 7 March 1994 (age 32) Kyiv, Ukraine

Sport
- Sport: Swimming
- Strokes: Freestyle, breaststroke, backstroke, butterfly
- Club: Invasport, Kyiv
Medal record
Event	1st	2nd	3rd
Paralympic Games	1	1	0
World Championships	0	1	2
European Championships	0	4	1
Swimming
Representing Ukraine
Paralympic Games
Gold medal – first place	2016 Rio	100m butterfly - S8
Silver medal – second place	2012 London	100m butterfly - S8
IPC World Championships
Silver medal – second place	2015 Glasgow	100m butterfly - S8
Bronze medal – third place	2013 Montreal	100m butterfly - S8
Bronze medal – third place	2013 Montreal	50m freestyle - S8
IPC European Championships
Silver medal – second place	2014 Eindhoven	50m freestyle S8
Silver medal – second place	2014 Eindhoven	100m butterfly S8
Silver medal – second place	2016 Funchal	50 m freestyle S8
Silver medal – second place	2016 Funchal	100 m butterfly S8
Bronze medal – third place	2014 Eindhoven	100m backstroke S8

Kateryna Istomina (born 7 March 1994) is a Paralympic swimmer from Ukraine. She competes in S8 and SM8 (individual medley) events.
