= Ani Palian =

Ukrainian Paralympic swimmer

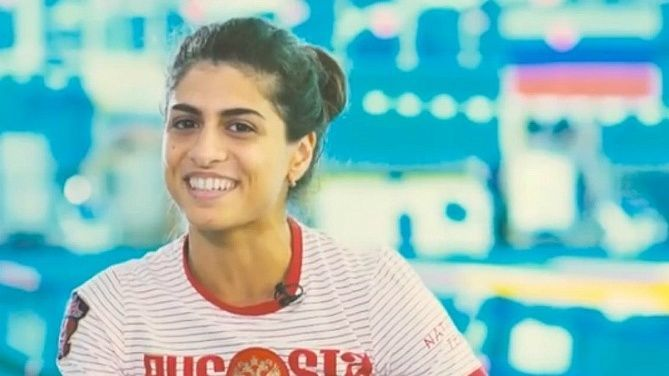

Personal information
- Nationality: Ukrainian/Russian
- Born: August 21, 1990 (age 35) Tbilisi, Georgian SSR, USSR

Sport
- Sport: Paralympic swimming
Medal record
Women's para swimming
Representing RPC
Silver medal – second place	2020 Tokyo	4×100 m medley 34pts
Representing Ukraine
Summer Paralympics
Bronze medal – third place	2012 London	50 metre freestyle S7
World Championships
Gold medal – first place	2010 Eindhoven	4x50 metre freestyle
Gold medal – first place	2013 Montreal	4x50 metre freestyle relay
Bronze medal – third place	2013 Montreal	400 metre freestyle S7
Bronze medal – third place	2013 Montreal	100 metre freestyle S7
European Championships
Bronze medal – third place	2011 Berlin	400m freestyle S7
Representing Russia
World Championships
Gold medal – first place	2015 Glasgow	50 metre freestyle S7
Silver medal – second place	2015 Glasgow	100 metre freestyle S7
Bronze medal – third place	2015 Glasgow	400 metre freestyle S7
Bronze medal – third place	2015 Glasgow	4x50 metre freestyle
Bronze medal – third place	2015 Glasgow	4x100 metre medley relay
Representing Neutral Paralympic Athletes
European Championships
Gold medal – first place	2024 Funchal	50 m butterfly S7

Ani Palian (born August 21, 1990 in Tbilisi) is a Russian (formerly Ukrainian) Paralympic swimmer.

In 1991, she moved with her parents to live in Crimea as a doctor suggested as Saky mineral mud might help with her treatment.

== Career ==
Palian has cerebral palsy and competes in S7 classification races.

She competed at the 2012 Paralympic Games where she won a bronze medal in the 50 metre freestyle S7 event.

She competed for Ukraine at the World Para Swimming Championships in 2010, where she won a gold medal in the 4x50 metre freestyle event, and in 2013, where she won a gold medal in the 4x50 metre freestyle relay event and bronze medals in the 400 metre freestyle S7 and 100 metre freestyle S7 events. She competed for Russia in 2015 and won a gold medal in the 50 metre freestyle S7 event, a silver medal in the 100 metre freestyle S7 event and bronze medals in the 400 metre freestyle S7, 4x50 metre freestyle and 4x100 metre medley relay events.

She also competed at the World Para Swimming European Championships in 2011, where she won a bronze medal in the 400m freestyle S7 event.

She was awarded with the Order of Princess Olga, third class, for her performance at the 2012 Paralympic Games. However, in 2015, after the occupation of Crimea by Russia, she began representing Russia in international competitions. In 2018, she joined the pro-Vladimir Putin organization PutinTeam.
