= Swimming at the 2012 Summer Paralympics – Men's 50 metre freestyle S4 =

Event at the 2012 Summer Paralympics

Men's 50 metre freestyle S4 at the XIV Paralympic Games
- Venue: London Aquatics Centre
- Dates: 31 August 2012
- Competitors: 16 from 13 nations

Medalists
1st place, gold medalist(s)		Eskender Mustafaiev	Ukraine
2nd place, silver medalist(s)		David Smetanine	France
3rd place, bronze medalist(s)		Jan Povysil	Czech Republic

The men's 50 metre freestyle S4 event at the 2012 Paralympic Games took place on 31 August, at the London Aquatics Centre.

Two heats were held, one with seven competitors, the other with eight. The swimmers with the eight fastest times advanced to the final.

== Heats ==
=== Heat 1 ===
Rank	Lane	Name	Nationality	Time	Notes
1	5	Gustavo Sanchez Martinez	Mexico	39.48	Q
2	6	Darko Duric	Slovenia	39.71	Q
3	4	Richard Oribe	Spain	39.80	Q
4	3	Jan Povysil	Czech Republic	40.65	Q
5	2	Michael Schoenmaker	Netherlands	43.01	
6	7	Aleksei Lyzhikhin	Russia	44.08	
7	1	Kestutis Skucas	Lithuania	52.13	

=== Heat 2 ===
Rank	Lane	Name	Nationality	Time	Notes
1	5	Eskender Mustafaiev	Ukraine	38.77	Q
2	4	David Smetanine	France	38.97	Q
3	3	Kyunghyun Kim	South Korea	40.37	Q
4	6	Christoffer Lindhe	Sweden	41.52	Q
5	7	Arnost Petracek	Czech Republic	43.12	
6	2	Ronystony Cordeiro da Silva	Brazil	44.22	
7	8	Grant Patterson	Australia	55.49	
8	1	Arnulfo Castorena	Mexico	1:03.49	

== Final ==
Rank	Lane	Name	Nationality	Time	Notes
1st place, gold medalist(s)	4	Eskender Mustafaiev	Ukraine	38.26	
2nd place, silver medalist(s)	5	David Smetanine	France	38.75	
3rd place, bronze medalist(s)	1	Jan Povysil	Czech Republic	39.47	
4	2	Richard Oribe	Spain	39.47	
5	3	Gustavo Sanchez Martinez	Mexico	39.97	
6	6	Darko Duric	Slovenia	40.21	
7	8	Christoffer Lindhe	Sweden	41.02	
8	7	Kyunghyun Kim	South Korea	42.49	
