= Cameron Leslie =

New Zealand swimmer (born 1990)

Cameron Leslie MNZM
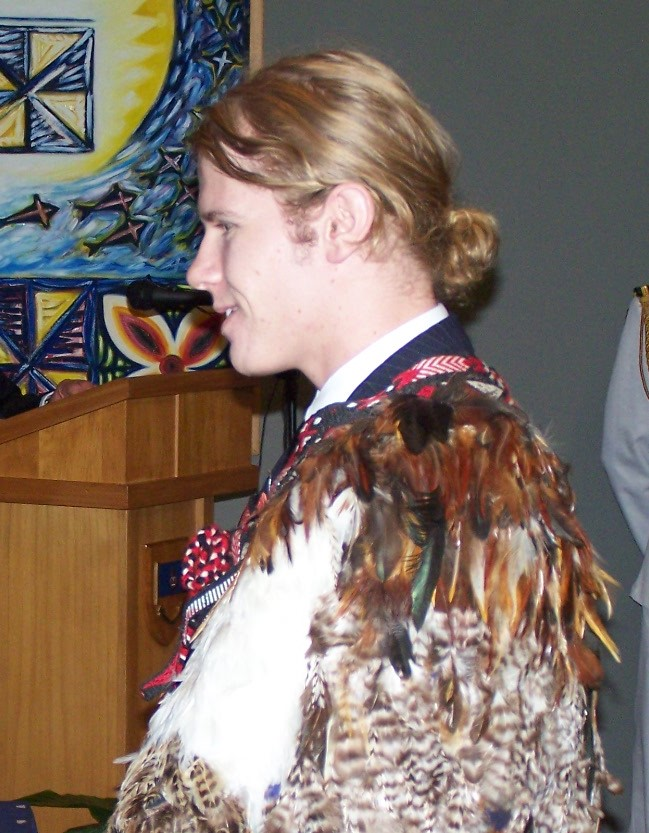
- Leslie in 2009

Personal information
- Born: 17 January 1990 (age 36) Whangārei, New Zealand
- Spouse: Emma Leslie

Sport
- Sport: Swimming
- Classifications: S5, SB3, SM4
- Club: North Shore Swimming Club
Medal record
Men's para swimming
Representing New Zealand
Paralympic Games
Gold medal – first place	2008 Beijing	150 m medley SM4
Gold medal – first place	2012 London	150 m medley SM4
Gold medal – first place	2016 Rio	150 m medley SM4
World Championships
Gold medal – first place	2013 Montreal	150 m medley SM4
Gold medal – first place	2019 London	50 m backstroke S4
Gold medal – first place	2022 Madeira	100 m freestyle S4
Gold medal – first place	2023 Manchester	50 m backstroke S4
Silver medal – second place	2022 Madeira	50 m backstroke S4
Silver medal – second place	2022 Madeira	50 m freestyle S4
Silver medal – second place	2022 Madeira	200 m freestyle S4
Silver medal – second place	2023 Manchester	50 m freestyle S4
Silver medal – second place	2023 Manchester	100 m freestyle S4
Silver medal – second place	2025 Singapore	50 m backstroke S4
Silver medal – second place	2025 Singapore	50 m freestyle S4
Bronze medal – third place	2013 Montreal	50 m backstroke S5
Bronze medal – third place	2023 Manchester	200 m freestyle S4

Cameron Leslie MNZM (born 17 January 1990) is a New Zealand paralympics swimmer and wheelchair rugby player.

== Early life and education ==
Leslie was born with a quadruple limb deficiency. He attended Pompallier Catholic Collage. He was also a student at Auckland University of Technology (abbr. AUT; Māori: Te Wānanga Aronui o Tāmaki Makau Rau). Leslie holds a Bachelor of Communication Studies from AUT.

Of Māori descent, Leslie affiliates to the Ngāpuhi iwi.

Leslie got into swimming at an early age, because there were few sporting options for people with disabilities. As a twelve-year-old, his coach placed negative values on him. These relations and a weak debut at the 2006 IPC Swimming World Championships in Durban, lead Leslie to nearly quit the sport.

At a Have a Go Day in 2007, Leslie was introduced to wheelchair rugby. Before long he went for training with the Auckland team twice a week. Soon after, he was selected for the Wheel Blacks.

== Career ==
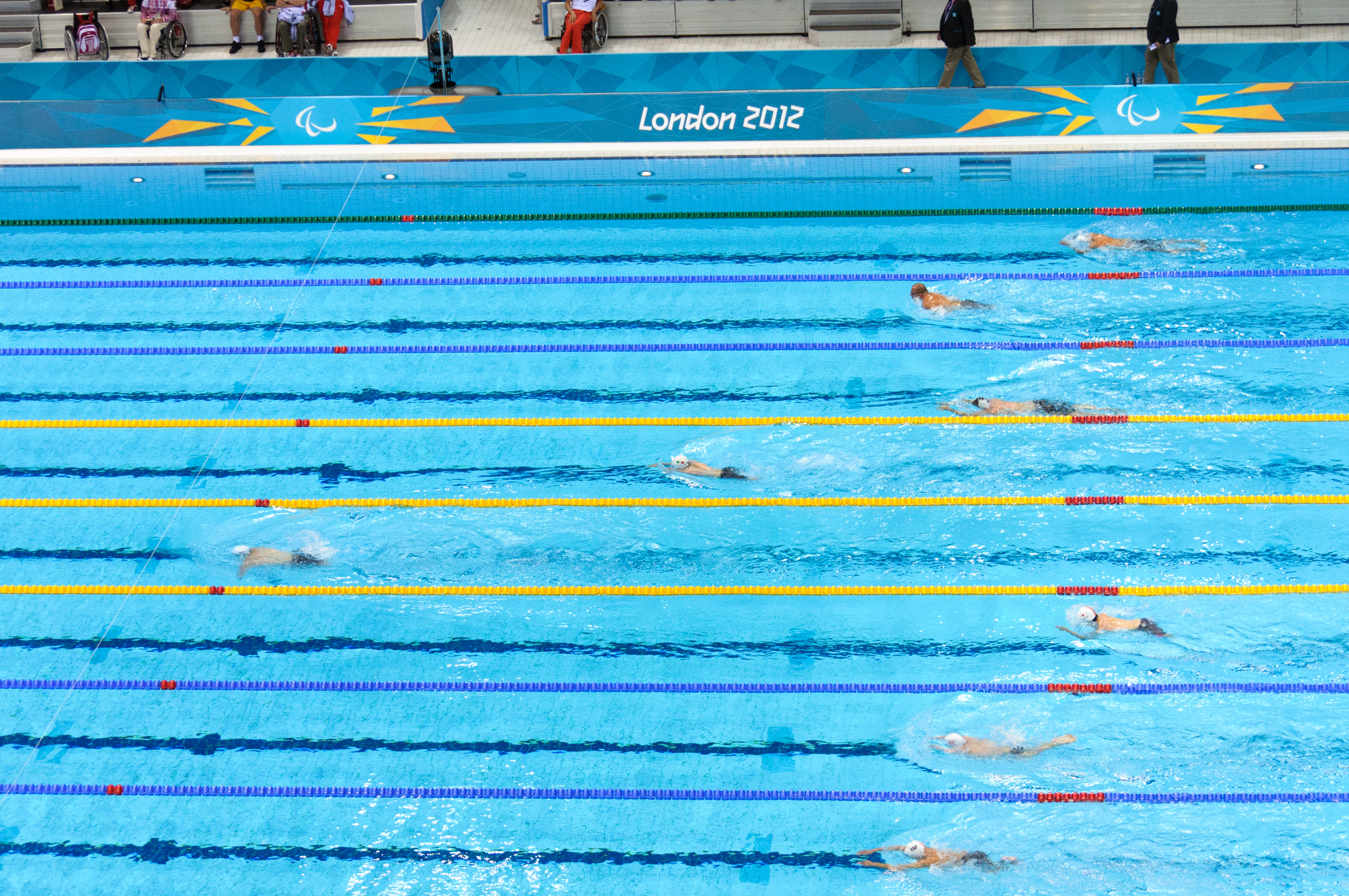
Leslie in front at the 2012 Summer Paralympics Men's 150m Individual Medley S4 swimming final.

Leslie won the gold medal in the men's 150 m individual medley at the 2008, 2012 and 2016 Summer Paralympics.

In 2013, he won the gold medal in the men's 150 m individual medley, and a bronze medal in the men's 50 m backstroke, at the IPC Swimming World Championships in Montreal. In 2019, he won the gold medal in the men's 50 m backstroke at the World Para Swimming Championships in London. Just prior to this, he helped New Zealand's wheelchair rugby team, the Wheel Blacks, claim a bronze medal at the IWRF Asia-Oceania Championship to qualify for the 2020 Summer Paralympics.

== Honours ==
In 2008 Leslie received the New Zealand University Blues Award for Maori Sportsperson of the Year and he was also awarded Auckland University of Technology's Male Athlete of the Year in the same year.

Leslie was made a Member of the New Zealand Order of Merit in the 2009 New Year's Honours, for services to swimming.

Leslie was appointed National Para Swimming Development Coordinator by Swimming New Zealand in September 2018. In this time, he supported the development of para swimming in 172 centres across New Zealand. In December 2019 he was then appointed as an intern on to the Board of Sport New Zealand.

Awards
Preceded by Corey Peters	Halberg Awards; Para Athlete or Para Team of the Year; 2023	Succeeded by Anna Grimaldi
