= 2013 IPC Swimming World Championships – Men's 100 metre freestyle =

Swimming competition

The men's 100 metre freestyle at the 2013 IPC Swimming World Championships was held at the Parc Jean Drapeau Aquatic Complex in Montreal from 12–18 August.

== Medalists ==
Class	Gold	Silver	Bronze
S1	Itzhak Mamistvalov; Israel	Hennadii Boiko; Ukraine	Anton Kol; Ukraine
S2	Dmitrii Kokarev; Russia	Aristeidis Makrodimitris; Greece	Jacek Czech; Poland
S3	Dmytro Vynohradets; Ukraine	Miguel Angel Martinez Tajuelo; Spain	Grant Patterson; Australia
S4	Darko Đurić; Slovenia	Eskender Mustafaiev; Ukraine	Gustavo Sanchez Martinez; Mexico
S5	Daniel Dias; Brazil	Roy Perkins; United States	Sebastian Rodriguez; Spain
S6	Nelson Crispín; Colombia	Talisson Glock; Brazil	Matthew Haanappel; Australia
S7	Josef Craig; United Kingdom	Matthew Levy; Australia	Yevheniy Bohodayko; Ukraine
S8	Denis Tarasov; Russia	Wang Yinan; China	Konstantin Lisenkov; Russia
S9	Matthew Cowdrey; Australia	Jose Antonio Mari Alcaraz; Spain	Rowan Crothers; Australia
S10	Andre Brasil; Brazil	Ian Jaryd Silverman; United States	Phelipe Andrews Melo Rodrigues; Brazil
S11	Keiichi Kimura; Japan	Hendri Herbst; South Africa	Matheus Rheine; Brazil
S12	Maksym Veraksa; Ukraine	Aleksandr Nevolin-Svetov; Russia	Danylo Chufarov; Ukraine
S13	Ihar Boki; Belarus	Iaroslav Denysenko; Ukraine	Charl Bouwer; South Africa

== See also ==
- List of IPC world records in swimming
