= Noga Nir-Kistler =

Israeli-born American Paralympic swimmer and table tennis player

Personal information
- Nationality: Israel → United States (U.S. Citizen 2003)
- Born: May 18, 1979 Israel
- Died: 14 December 2021 (aged 42)
- Height: 5 ft 4 in (1.63 m)
- Weight: 120 lb (54 kg)
- Spouse: Fred Kistler

Sport
- Sport: table tennis, swimming
- Club: Allentown/Lehigh Valley Table Tennis Club; Emmaus Aquatic Club
Medal record
Event	1st	2nd	3rd
Paralympic Games	0	0	1
Parapan American Games	0	2	0
Swimming World Championships	0	2	2
Athletics
Parapan American Games
Silver medal – second place	2007 Rio de Janeiro	Women's singles C4-5
Silver medal – second place	2007 Rio de Janeiro	Women's team C4-5
Swimming
Paralympic Games
Bronze medal – third place	2012 London	100m breaststroke S5
IPC World Championships
Silver medal – second place	2013 Montreal	100m breaststroke SB5
Silver medal – second place	2013 Montreal	100m freestyle S6
Bronze medal – third place	2013 Montreal	50m butterfly S6
Bronze medal – third place	2013 Montreal	4x50m medley relay 20pts

Noga Nir-Kistler (May 18, 1979 – December 14, 2021) was an Israeli-born American Paralympic swimmer and table tennis player who won a Pennsylvania State Championship in table tennis in competition against able-bodied former champions, participated in table tennis in the 2008 Beijing Paralympics, and won a bronze medal representing the United States in the 2012 London Paralympics in the 200-meter breaststroke.

== Early life and education ==
Nir-Kistler was born on May 18, 1979, in Israel, to Eliezer Nir and Nira Nir, the youngest child of a family with three older brothers. She competed as a youth as a member of Israel's Junior National Swim Team.

In 1997, she relocated to the Lehigh Valley region of eastern Pennsylvania with her parents after her father Eliezer, an engineer, was hired by Lehigh University in Bethlehem, Pennsylvania. She attended Whitehall High School, and swam for the school's team in 1998, the year she graduated. She resided in Salisbury Township, Pennsylvania.

Nir-Kistler worked as a lifeguard and swim instructor at Allentown YMCA in Allentown. In 1999, after two years in Pennsylvania, her family returned to Israel, but she decided to remain and become a U.S. citizen. She first learned table tennis from her husband Fred, a local table tennis champion, having never played the game before meeting him. In 1999, as a student at Lehigh Carbon Community College, her disability from Reflex Sympathetic Dystrophy (RSD) began to slow her down, and she was forced to leave school. By age 20, she used a wheelchair.

From 2000 to 2004, she underwent 14 surgeries. The disease affected her left hand, requiring her to switch hands when she played table tennis, an adjustment that somehow did not reduce her competitiveness. Her surgeries reduced her pain and allowed her to continue her pursuit of athletics, but pain still persisted, and her condition varied over time.

== Athletic career ==
=== Competitive swimming ===
In 2010, she returned to swimming, and competed as a member of the U.S. Paralympic team.

=== Competitive table tennis ===
In 2003, she won a Pennsylvania state title in table tennis against able bodied players, beating 12-time champion Nancy Newcomber of Lancaster, Pennsylvania. She and her husband both won medals at the Keystone State Games in August 1999. In December 2003, she won a title at the U.S. Open National Championships at the United States Olympic Training Center in Colorado Springs, Colorado.

In December 2006, she won a gold and silver at the U.S. Open Table Tennis Championship in Las Vegas.

Nir-Kistler won two silver medals at the 2007 Parapan American Games in Rio de Janeiro in both table tennis singles and doubles.

In 2008, she was ranked the top U.S. female paralympic table tennis player, and eighth in the world among those with Class 5 (least) handicapped players.

=== 2004 Paralympics ===
She was chosen as a U.S. team member for the 2004 Summer Paralympics in table tennis. Due to a downturn in her health, however, she did not travel with the team to participate in the games.

=== 2008 Paralympics ===
In 2008, Nir-Kistler was rated the No. 1 U.S. Paralympic table tennis player and participated in table tennis at the 2008 Summer Paralympics in Beijing, but did not medal. She had several coaches and training partners attributed to the team's success, including Jason Brader, owner of the well-known FASST Performance Center in the Lehigh Valley, John Larson, Head Coach of the Emmaus Aquatic Club (EMAC), and George Frick, owner of A&H Sporting Goods, who often acted as a sponsor.

=== 2012 Paralympic bronze ===
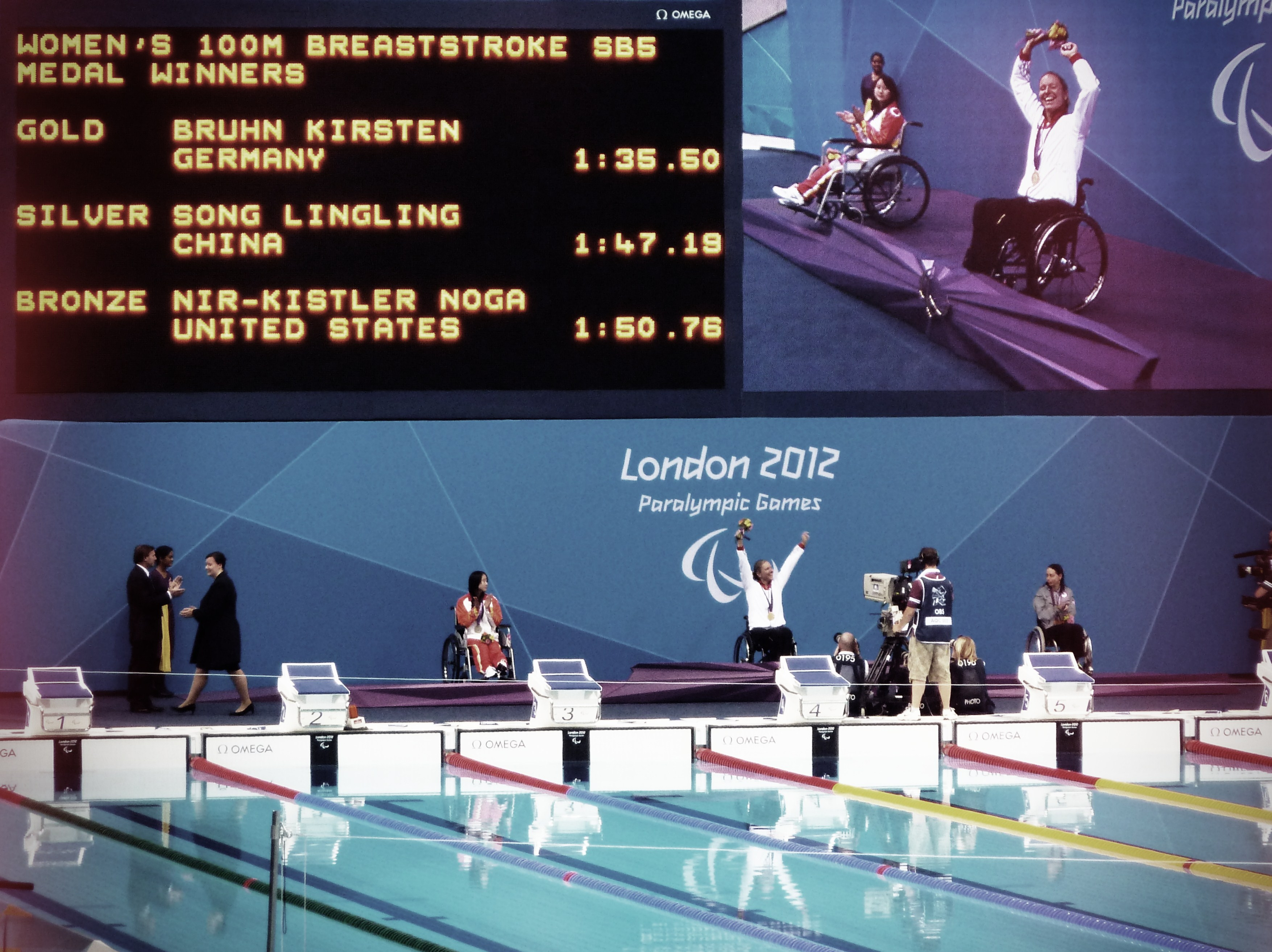
Nir-Kistler (on far right, in gray jacket) at the 2012 Summer Paralympics medal ceremony

Nir-Kistler participated in the preliminary heats in five events at the 2012 Summer Paralympics in London, spanning every stroke, but made the finals in only two events. On September 4, 2012, swimming for the United States, she placed sixth in the final round of the 50-meter freestyle with a time of 36.83.

She won a bronze medal in 100 metres (330 ft) breaststroke on September 5, 2012 with a time of 1:50.75 at the 2012 Summer Paralympics. Her disability prevented her from using her legs to kick, so all her propulsion was provided by her upper body.

At the 2013 World Championships in Montreal, she won a silver medal in both the 100-meter breast stroke and freestyle, and bronze medals in the 50-meter butterfly and 4x50 medley relay.

In 2016, at the age of 37, she qualified for the U.S. Paralympic swimming team in the 100 breaststroke, 50 butterfly, and 50 freestyle at the summer trials in Charlotte, North Carolina. However, the Olympic Committee notified her 10 hours before her takeoff time that her pulmonologist decided it was not advisable for her to compete since she had not yet thoroughly recovered from a bout of pneumonia.

== Death ==
She died on December 14, 2021, at age 42.
