= Teigan Van Roosmalen =

Australian Paralympic swimmer (born 1991)

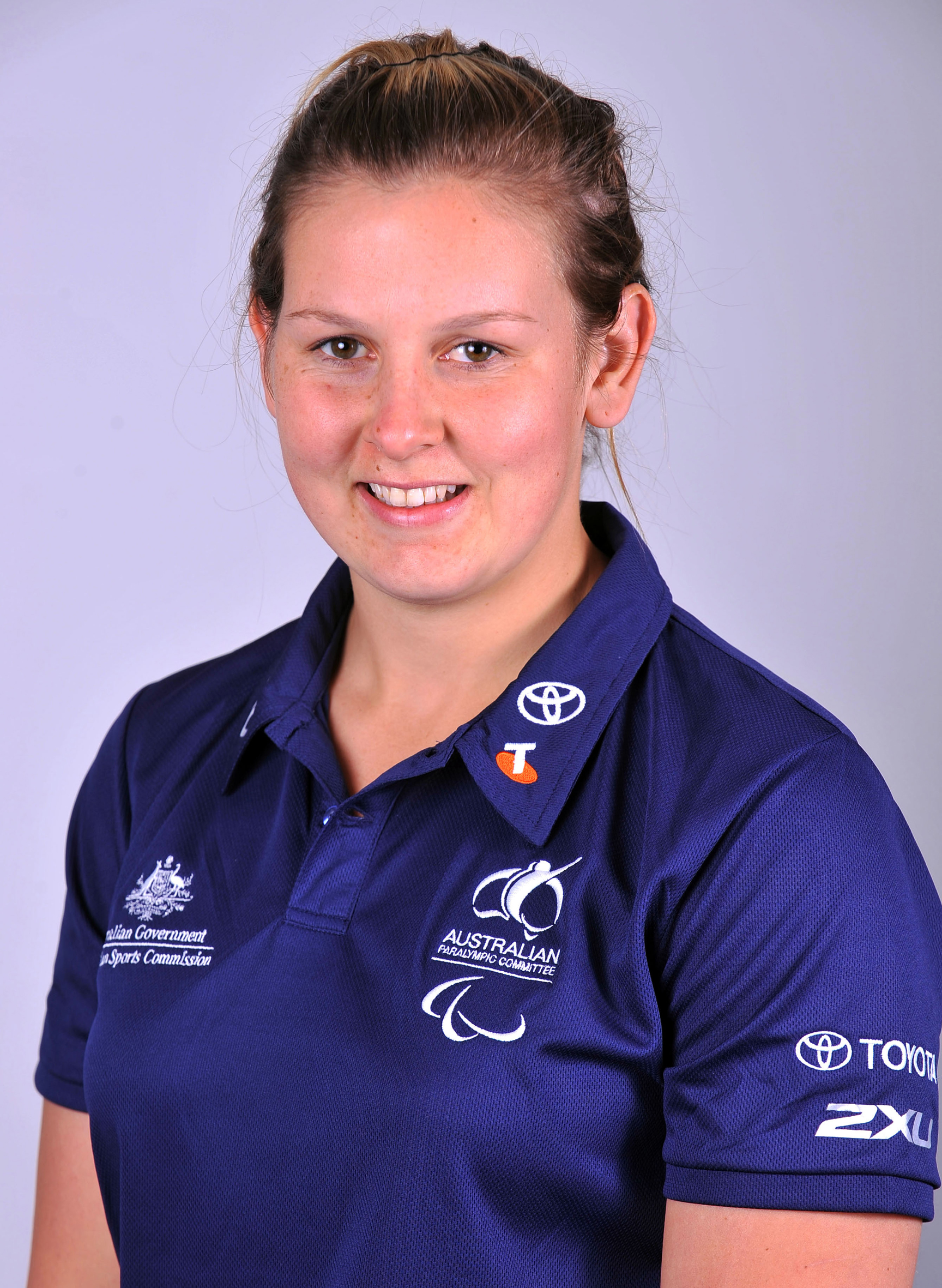
- Portrait, 2012

Personal information
- Nationality: Australia
- Born: 6 April 1991 (age 35) Bateau Bay, New South Wales, Australia

Sport
- Sport: Swimming
- Strokes: Freestyle, breaststroke, medley
- Classifications: S13, SB13, SM13
Medal record
Women's paralympic swimming
Representing Australia
World Championships (LC)
Bronze medal – third place	2013 Montreal	100 m breaststroke SB13
Bronze medal – third place	2013 Montreal	100 m butterfly S13
Bronze medal – third place	2013 Montreal	100 m backstroke S13
Bronze medal – third place	2013 Montreal	200 m medley SM13
Para Pan Pacific Championships
Gold medal – first place	2011 Edmonton	400 m freestyle S13

Teigan Van Roosmalen (born 6 April 1991) is an Australian Paralympic S13 swimmer. She has Usher syndrome type 1, and is legally blind and profoundly deaf. She had a swimming scholarship from the Australian Institute of Sport from 2009 to 2012. Her events are the 100 m breaststroke, 200 m individual medley, and the 50 m and 100 m freestyle. She competed at the 2011 Para Pan Pacific Championships in Edmonton, where she won a gold medal in the S13 400 m freestyle event. She competed at the 2008 Summer and 2012 Summer Paralympics.

== Personal ==
Van Roosmalen was born in Bateau Bay, New South Wales, on 6 April 1991. She "is legally blind and deaf, with cysts pushing on her optic nerve causing blackouts in one eye." This is a result of Usher syndrome and retinitis pigmentosa. She has a brother who is also involved with the surfing community, and has competed at the Australian Surf Titles. In 2009, she was working towards earning her Higher School Certificate. In addition to her professional swimming career, she is qualified remedial massage therapist, swimming instructor and swimming development coach.

Van Roosmalen was photographed by Central Coast Express Advocate photographer Troy Snook, whose picture of her finished second in the Northern region in the 2010 Community Newspaper Association Awards. A photograph of her has graced the front of the 2006 Central Coast telephone book.

== Swimming ==
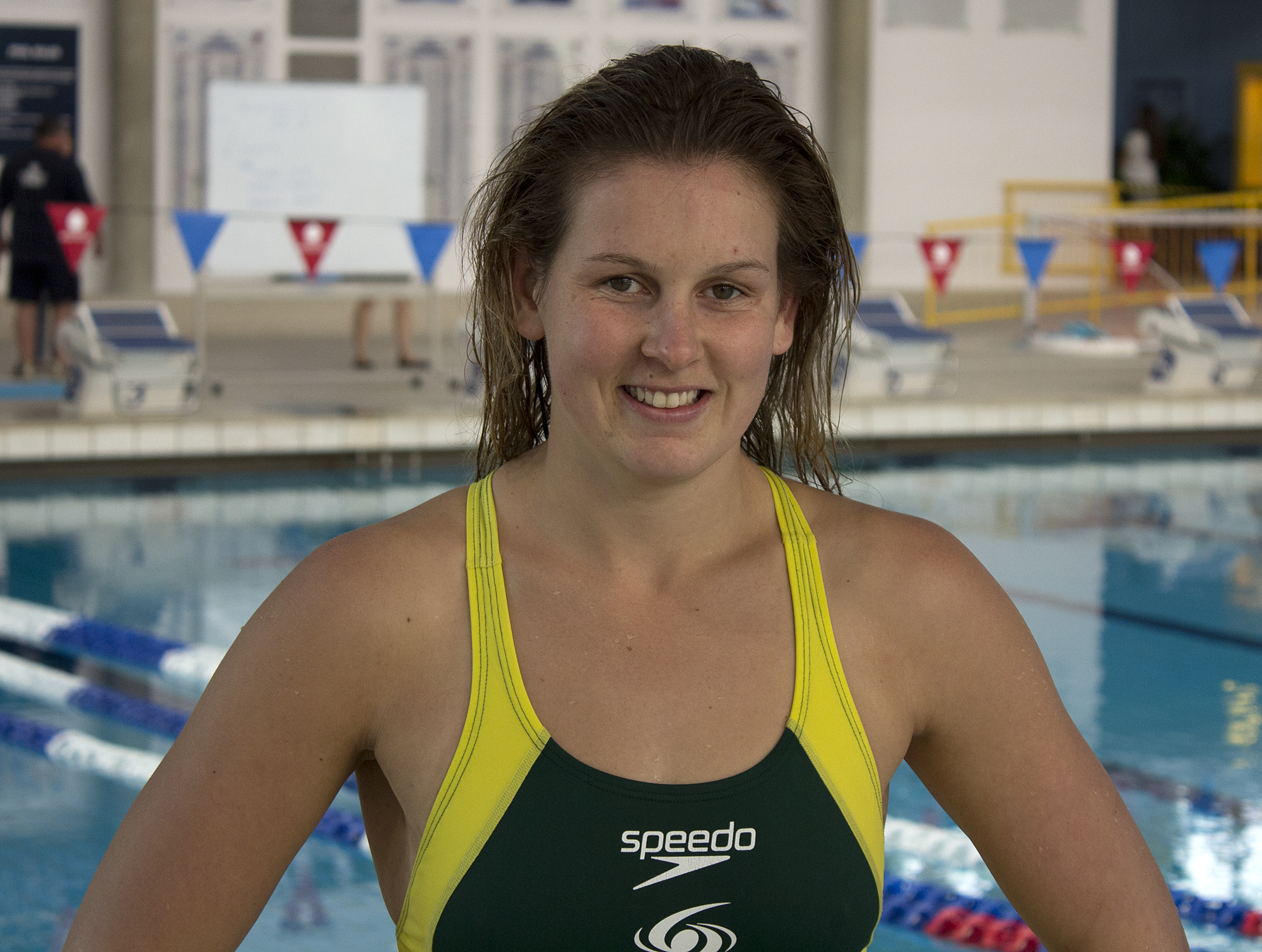
Van Roosmalen in 2012

Van Roosmalen is an S13 and S15 swimmer, with a swimming scholarship from the Australian Institute of Sport. Her events are the 100 m breaststroke, 200 m individual medley, 50 m and 100 m freestyle. She has trained with Ellie Cole. As of January 2012, she is ranked No.2 in the world in the 100 m breaststroke, fourth in the 200 m IM, fifth in the 100 m freestyle and sixth in the 50 m freestyle." In 2010, she was ranked first in the world in the 100 m breaststroke. Her Australian Institute of Sport coach is Graeme Carroll. At the Australian Institute of Sport, she changed her training and went from focusing on the butterfly to the medley and breaststroke events. Her home pool is Mingara Aquatic. When she trains there, she is coached by Kim Taylor. She also competes in able-bodied swimming events.

Van Roosmalen started swimming in 1997 and first represented Australia at the 2005 Deaflympics in Melbourne. In 2007, she set an Australian age record and won a gold medal at the Arafura Games in the 100 m butterfly event. In 2007, she also competed at the Australian Short Course Championships. In 2008, she competed at the IPC Swimming World Cup and took home a set of bronze medals. In 2009, she competed at the New South Wales Country swimming championships where she came away with four gold medals. That year, she also competed at the Paralympic World Cup in Manchester, England. She finished eleventh in the Women's MD 100 Freestyle event with a personal time of 1:06.97, less than a second behind Ellie Cole. She finished ninth in the Women's MD 100 Breaststroke event with a personal best time of 1:29.76. She finished third in the Women's S13 100 Butterfly event with a personal best time of 1:08.24. At the 2008 Beijing Games, she competed in six events and did not win a medal.

In 2010, Van Roosmalen competed at the Australian short course championships, which were held in Brisbane, Queensland. She won three medals at the competition, but also re-injured her shoulder. She also competed at the 2010 IPC Swimming World Championships held in Eindhoven, the Netherlands in the S11-13 events, but did not win any medals, the only Australian at the competition to do so. She had a time of 4:59.67 in the women's 400 m freestyle S13 event, where she finished fourth. In the 50m freestyle S13 event, she finished fifth, setting a personal best with a time of 29.97. A shoulder injury almost prevented her from competing in the competition, with a question regarding her participation because of the necessity of a medical clearance until such a time that she boarded the plane to depart Australia. She competed at the 2011 Para Pan Pacific Championships in Edmonton, Alberta, where she finished first in the S13 400 freestyle event, her first medal finish at a major international competition. In January 2012, she competed at the Australian Deaf Games in Geelong, Victoria. She finished first in the 100m Butterfly Women's Open event with a games record time of 1.09.68. She finished first in the 50m Breaststroke Women's Open event with a time of 39.82. She finished third in the 100m Backstroke Women's Open event with a time of 1.17.28. She was credited with having the "Outstanding Swim of the Meet" by the Games's organisers.

Van Roosmalen competed at the 2008 Summer Paralympics in six different swimming events, qualifying for the finals in four events. In the process, she set several personal best times. At the games, she participated in a re-run of the 400m S13 freestyle final because of an equipment malfunction. She competed at the Australian championships on 15 March 2012 in order to qualify for the games. She was successful, and swam in four events, finishing sixth in the 50m freestyle - S13, seventh in the 100m freestyle - S13 and the 100m breaststroke - SB13, and sixth in the 200m metre individual medley SM13.

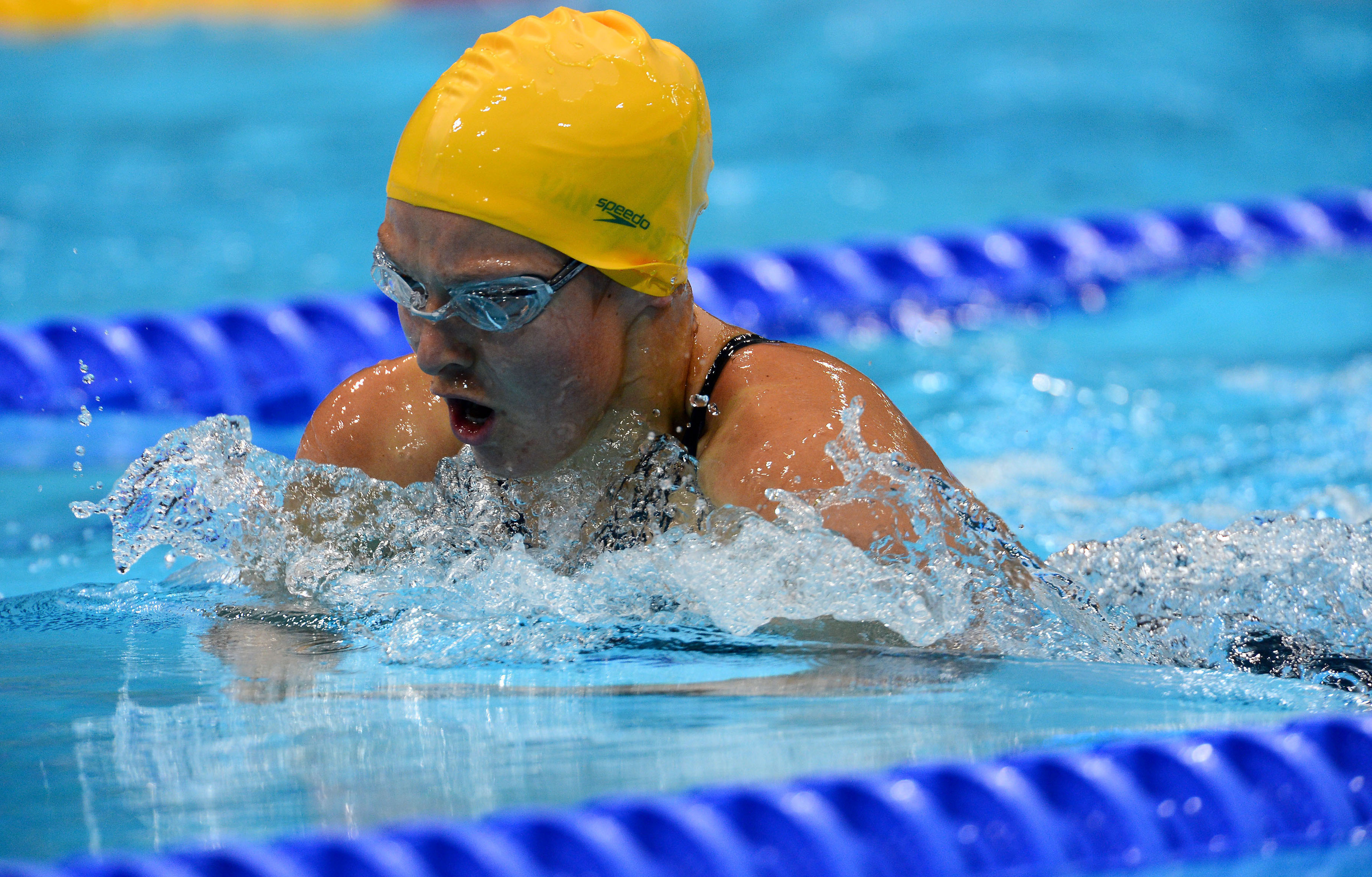
Van Roosmalen at the 2012 London Paralympics

Competing at the 2013 IPC Swimming World Championships in Montreal, Quebec, Canada, Van Roosmalen won four bronze medals in the Women's 200 m Individual Medley SM13, Women's 100m Butterfly S13, Women's 100m Breaststroke SB13 and Women's 100m Backstroke S13.

At the 2015 IPC Swimming World Championships, Glasgow, Scotland, she finished fifth in the Women's 100m Backstroke S13, sixth in the Women's 100m Breaststroke SB13 and seventh in the Women's 50m Freestyle S13 and Women's 200m Individual Medley SM13.

=== Personal best times ===
The following are van Roosmalen's personal best times as of 16 September 2012:

Type	Event	Time	Meet	Swim Date	Reference
Long Course	50m Backstroke	36.46	2009 Telstra Australian Swimming Championships	17-Mar-09	
Long Course	100m Backstroke	01:17.0	2011 Telstra Australian Swimming Championships	1-Apr-11	
Long Course	50m Breaststroke	39.4	2012 Victorian Championships	14-Jan-12	
Long Course	100m Breaststroke	01:24.0	2011 MC Age Championships	9-Oct-11	
Long Course	50m Butterfly	31.75	2009 Telstra Australian Swimming Championships	17-Mar-09	
Long Course	100m Butterfly	01:09.2	2009 Telstra Australian Swimming Championships	17-Mar-09	
Long Course	200m Butterfly	02:33.1	2009 NSW State Open Championships	13-Feb-09	
Long Course	50m Freestyle	29.40	2012 Summer Paralympics	1-Sep-12	
Long Course	100m Freestyle	01:04.5	2011 Telstra Australian Swimming Championships	1-Apr-11	
Long Course	400m Freestyle	04:57.5	2010 Telstra Australian Champions	16-Mar-10	
Long Course	200m Medley	02:36.9	2012 NSW State Open Championships All Events	10-Feb-12	
Open Water	5000m Freestyle	15:15.2	2008 Australian Age Open Water	14-Apr-08	
Short Course	50m Backstroke	35.81	2007 NSW Country SC Championships	7-Jul-07	
Short Course	100m Backstroke	01:12.6	2011 Australian Short Course Championships	2-Jul-11	
Short Course	50m Breaststroke	40.78	2007 NSW Country SC Championships	7-Jul-07	
Short Course	100m Breaststroke	01:23.6	2011 Australian Short Course Championships	3-Jul-11	
Short Course	50m Butterfly	31.74	2010 Telstra Australian Short Course	14-Jul-10	
Short Course	100m Butterfly	01:08.5	2010 Telstra Australian Short Course	14-Jul-10	
Short Course	200m Butterfly	02:29.2	2009 NSW State Open SC Championships	24-Jul-09	
Short Course	50m Freestyle	29.13	2011 Australian Short Course Championships	1-Jul-11	
Short Course	100m Freestyle	01:03.8	2010 Telstra Australian Short Course	14-Jul-10	
Short Course	400m Freestyle	04:49.7	2010 Telstra Australian Short Course	14-Jul-10	
Short Course	200m Medley	02:33.4	2010 Telstra Australian Short Course	14-Jul-10	

== Recognition ==
In 2008, Van Roosmalen was named the Central Coast Young Achiever winner. In February 2009, she was named the Express Advocate Young Achiever. A picture of her appears in the Powerhouse Museum's Wall of Fame. In 2011, she received a Sport Achievement Award from the Australian Institute of Sport. In 2017, she received Swimming Australia Services to the Australian Swim Team Award.
