= 2015 IPC Swimming World Championships – Women's 50 metre freestyle =

The women's 50 metre freestyle at the 2015 IPC Swimming World Championships was held at the Tollcross International Swimming Centre in Glasgow, United Kingdom from 13–17 July.

== Medalists ==
Event	Gold		Silver		Bronze	
S4	Nely Miranda Herrera (S4); Mexico	40.08 WR	Arjola Trimi (S4); Italy	41.69 EU	Zulfiya Gabidullina (S3); Kazakhstan	48.18
S5	Joana Maria Silva; Brazil	38.39	Teresa Perales; Spain	38.59	Inbal Pezaro; Israel	40.17
S6	Yelyzaveta Mereshko; Ukraine	34.14 WR	Viktoriia Savtsova; Ukraine	34.20	Tiffany Thomas Kane; Australia	34.73 OC
S7	Ani Palian; Russia	33.67	Cortney Jordan; United States	33.70	Denise Grahl; Germany	34.72
S8	Maddison Elliott; Australia	30.52	Lakeisha Patterson; Australia	31.62	Olesia Vladykina; Russia	31.65
S9	Sarai Gascon; Spain	29.41	Michelle Konkoly; United States	29.45	Ellie Cole; Australia	29.61
S10	Aurelie Rivard; Canada	27.87 AM	Nina Ryabova; Russia	27.91 EU	Sophie Pascoe; New Zealand	28.00
S11	Li Guizhi; China	31.18 CR	Mary Fisher; New Zealand	31.78	Maja Reichard; Sweden	32.74
S12	Hannah Russell; Great Britain	27.51	Darya Stukalova; Russia	27.53	Naomi Maike Schnittger; Germany	28.29
S13	Anna Krivshina; Russia	27.49 CR	Anna Stetsenko; Ukraine	27.80	Joanna Mendak; Poland	28.39

Legend
WR: World record, CR: Championship record, AF: Africa record, AM: Americas record, AS: Asian record, EU: European record, OS: Oceania record

== See also ==
- List of IPC world records in swimming
