= 2013 IPC Swimming World Championships – Women's 50 metre freestyle =

The women's 50 metre freestyle at the 2013 IPC Swimming World Championships was held at the Parc Jean Drapeau Aquatic Complex in Montreal from 12 to 18 August.

== Medalists ==
Class	Gold	Silver	Bronze
S3	Olga Sviderska; Ukraine	Zulfiya Gabidullina; Kazakhstan	Xia Jiangbo; China
S4	Nely Miranda Herrera; Mexico	Arjola Trimi; Italy	Lisette Teunissen; Netherlands
S5	Viktoriia Savtsova; Ukraine	Nataliia Prologaieva; Ukraine	Joana Maria Silva; Brazil
S6	Emanuela Romano; Italy	Noga Nir-Kistler; United States	Ellie Simmonds; United Kingdom
S7	Cortney Jordan; United States	Susannah Rodgers; United Kingdom	Brianna Nelson; Canada
S8	Maddison Elliott; Australia	Morgan Bird; Canada	Kateryna Istomina; Ukraine
S9	Sarai Gascón Moreno; Spain	Irina Grazhdanova; Russia	Lin Ping; China
S10	Sophie Pascoe; New Zealand	Élodie Lorandi; France	Aurelie Rivard; Canada
S11	Mary Fisher; New Zealand	Li Guizhi; China	Maja Reichard; Sweden
S12	Darya Stukalova; Russia	Hannah Russell; United Kingdom	Deborah Font; Spain
S13	Valerie Grand-Maison; Canada	Anna Krivshina; Russia	Elena Krawzow; Germany

== See also ==
- List of IPC world records in swimming
