= 2013 IPC Swimming World Championships – Women's 100 metre breaststroke =

The women's 100 metre breaststroke at the 2013 IPC Swimming World Championships was held at the Parc Jean Drapeau Aquatic Complex in Montreal from 12–18 August.

== Medalists ==
Class	Gold	Silver	Bronze
SB4	Sarah Louise Rung; Norway	Nataliia Prologaieva; Ukraine	Natalia Shavel; Belarus
SB5	Kirsten Bruhn; Germany	Noga Nir-Kistler; United States	Verena Schott; Germany
SB6	Susana Ribeiro; Brazil	Viktoriia Savtsova; Ukraine	Charlotte Henshaw; United Kingdom
SB7	Ulyana Kuznetsova; Russia	Lisa den Braber; Netherlands	Oksana Khrul; Ukraine
SB8	Olesya Vladykina; Russia	Claire Cashmore; United Kingdom	Ellen Keane; Ireland
SB9	Sophie Pascoe; New Zealand	Harriet Lee; United Kingdom	Khrystyna Yurchenko; Ukraine
SB11	Maja Reichard; Sweden	Nadia Baez; Argentina	Yana Berezhna; Ukraine
SB12	Karolina Pelendritou; Cyprus	Emely Telle; Germany	Maryna Stabrovska; Ukraine
SB13	Elena Krawzow; Germany	Colleen Young; United States	Teigan van Roosmalen; Australia
SB14	Michelle Alonso Morales; Spain	Bethany Firth; Ireland	Nicole Lough; United Kingdom

== See also ==
- List of IPC world records in swimming
