= 2013 IPC Swimming World Championships – Men's 200 metre freestyle =

The men's 200 metre freestyle at the 2013 IPC Swimming World Championships was held at the Parc Jean Drapeau Aquatic Complex in Montreal from 12 to 18 August.

== Medalists ==
Class	Gold	Silver	Bronze
S3	Dmytro Vynohradets; Ukraine	Miguel Angel Martinez Tajuelo; Spain	Ioannis Kostakis; Greece
S4	Gustavo Sanchez Martinez; Mexico	Darko Đurić; Slovenia	Michael Schoenmaker; Netherlands
S5	Daniel Dias; Brazil	Roy Perkins; United States	James Scully; Ireland
S14	Daniel Fox; Australia	Jon Margeir Sverrisson; Iceland	Wonsang Cho; South Korea

== See also ==
- List of IPC world records in swimming
