= Swimming at the 2012 Summer Paralympics – Women's 50 metre butterfly S5 =

Women's 50m Butterfly S5 at the XIV Paralympic Games
- Venue: London Aquatics Centre
- Dates: 7 September
- Competitors: 12 from 10 nations
- Winning time: 41.76

Medalists
1st place, gold medalist(s)		Sarah Louise Rung	Norway
2nd place, silver medalist(s)		Teresa Perales	Spain
3rd place, bronze medalist(s)		Joana Maria Silva	Brazil

The women's 50m butterfly S5 event at the 2012 Summer Paralympics took place at the London Aquatics Centre on 7 September. There were two heats; the swimmers with the eight fastest times advanced to the final.

== Results ==
=== Heats ===
Competed from 11:07.

==== Heat 1 ====
Rank	Lane	Name	Nationality	Time	Notes
1	4	Teresa Perales	Spain	43.22	Q
2	5	Joana Maria Silva	Brazil	48.37	Q, AM
3	3	Wu Qi	China	48.84	Q
4	2	Reka Kezdi	Hungary	50.49	Q
5	6	Diana Zambo	Hungary	51.19	Q
6	7	Natalia Gavrilyuk	Russia	58.74	

==== Heat 2 ====
Rank	Lane	Name	Nationality	Time	Notes
1	4	Sarah Louise Rung	Norway	42.60	Q
2	5	Natalia Shavel	Belarus	47.01	Q
3	3	Katalin Engelhardt	Hungary	50.79	Q
4	2	Jaide Childs	United States	51.57	
5	6	Simone Fragoso	Portugal	58.14	
	7	Stefania Chiarioni	Italy	DSQ	

=== Final ===
Competed at 19:28.

Rank	Lane	Name	Nationality	Time	Notes
1st place, gold medalist(s)	4	Sarah Louise Rung	Norway	41.76	
2nd place, silver medalist(s)	5	Teresa Perales	Spain	42.67	
3rd place, bronze medalist(s)	6	Joana Maria Silva	Brazil	46.62	AM
4	3	Natalia Shavel	Belarus	46.64	
5	2	Wu Qi	China	47.51	AS
6	1	Katalin Engelhardt	Hungary	47.71	
7	7	Reka Kezdi	Hungary	48.92	
8	8	Diana Zambo	Hungary	52.59	

'Q = qualified for final. AM = Americas Record. AS = Asian Record. DSQ = Disqualified.
