= 2013 IPC Swimming World Championships – Women's 200 metre medley =

The women's 200 metre medley at the 2013 IPC Swimming World Championships was held at the Parc Jean Drapeau Aquatic Complex in Montreal from 12 to 18 August.

== Medalists ==
Class	Gold	Silver	Bronze
SM5	Sarah Louise Rung; Norway	Natalia Shavel; Belarus	Nataliia Shestopal; Ukraine
SM6	Ellie Simmonds; United Kingdom	Verena Schott; Germany	Oksana Khrul; Ukraine
SM7	Nikita Howarth; New Zealand	Brianna Nelson; Canada	Cortney Jordan; United States
SM8	Jessica Long; United States	Stephanie Slater; United Kingdom	Olesya Vladykina; Russia
SM9	Amy Marren; United Kingdom	Stephanie Millward; United Kingdom	Claire Cashmore; United Kingdom
SM10	Nina Ryabova; Russia	Katherine Downie; Australia	Aurelie Rivard; Canada
SM11	Mary Fisher; New Zealand	Daniela Schulte; Germany	Maja Reichard; Sweden
SM12	Darya Stukalova; Russia	Carla Casals; Spain	Karina Petrikovicova; Slovakia
SM13	Rebecca Anne Meyers; United States	Valerie Grand-Maison; Canada	Teigan van Roosmalen; Australia
SM14	Marlou van der Kulk; Netherlands	Jessica-Jane Applegate; United Kingdom	Chloe Davies; United Kingdom

== See also ==
- List of IPC world records in swimming
