= 2013 IPC Swimming World Championships – Women's 4 × 50 metre freestyle relay =

The women's 4 x 50 metre freestyle relay at the 2013 IPC Swimming World Championships was held at the Parc Jean Drapeau Aquatic Complex in Montreal from 12–18 August.

== Medalists ==
Points	Gold	Silver	Bronze
20 pts	Viktoriia Savtsova S5; Olga Sviderska S3; Nataliia Prologaieva S5; Ani Palian S7; Ukraine	Giulia Ghiretti S5; Stefania Chiarioni S5; Arjola Trimi S4; Emanuela Romano S6; Italy	Alexandra Agafonova S3; Irina Kolmogorova S4; Anastasia Diodorova S6; Oxana Guseva S7; Russia

== See also ==
- List of IPC world records in swimming
