= Denis Tarasov =

Russian Paralympic swimmer

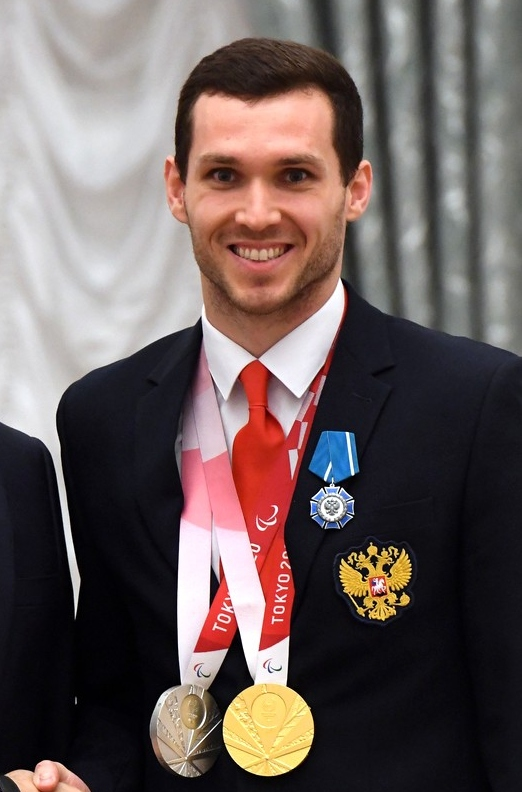
- Tarasov in 2021

Personal information
- Born: 31 July 1993 (age 33) Engels, Saratov Oblast, Russia
- Education: Saratov State University
- Height: 1.75 m (5 ft 9 in)

Sport
- Sport: Swimming
- Club: Youth Adaptive Sports School Rehabilitation and Physical Education: Saratov
- Coached by: Svetlana Borisovskaya

Achievements and titles
- Olympic finals: 2012
Medal record
Representing Russia
Paralympic Games
Gold medal – first place	2012 London	50 m freestyle – S8
Silver medal – second place	2012 London	100 m freestyle – S8
Silver medal – second place	2012 London	100 m backstroke – S8
Silver medal – second place	2012 London	4×100 m medley relay 34pts
Bronze medal – third place	2012 London	4×100 m freestyle relay 34pts
IPC World Championships
Gold medal – first place	2013 Montreal	50 m freestyle S8
Gold medal – first place	2013 Montreal	100 m freestyle S8
Gold medal – first place	2015 Glasgow	100 m freestyle relay 34pts
Gold medal – first place	2015 Glasgow	100 m backstroke S8
Gold medal – first place	2015 Glasgow	4x100 m medley relay 34pts
Gold medal – first place	2015 Glasgow	50 m freestyle S8
Gold medal – first place	2015 Glasgow	100 m freestyle S8
Gold medal – first place	2015 Glasgow	100 m butterfly S8
Silver medal – second place	2013 Montreal	100 m backstroke S8
Silver medal – second place	2013 Montreal	100 m butterfly S8
Silver medal – second place	2013 Montreal	4x100 m medley relay 34pts
Bronze medal – third place	2013 Montreal	4x50 m medley relay 20pts
Bronze medal – third place	2013 Montreal	4x100 m freestyle relay 34pts
World Para Swimming European ChampionshipsEuropean Championships
Gold medal – first place	2014 Eindhoven	50m freestyle S8
Gold medal – first place	2014 Eindhoven	100m freestyle S8
Gold medal – first place	2014 Eindhoven	4x100m freestyle relay 34pts
Gold medal – first place	2014 Eindhoven	4x100m medley relay 34pts
Gold medal – first place	2016 Funchal	50m freestyle S8
Gold medal – first place	2016 Funchal	100m freestyle S8
Gold medal – first place	2016 Funchal	100 m butterfly – S8
Gold medal – first place	2016 Funchal	4x100m freestyle relay 34pts
Gold medal – first place	2016 Funchal	4x100m medley relay 34pts
Silver medal – second place	2014 Eindhoven	400m freestyle S8
Silver medal – second place	2014 Eindhoven	100m butterfly S8
Bronze medal – third place	2014 Eindhoven	100m backstroke S8
Bronze medal – third place	2026 Kocaeli	50 m freestyle S9
Representing Neutral Paralympic Athletes
Paralympic Games
Silver medal – second place	2024 Paris	50 m freestyle S9

Denis Tarasov (born 31 July 1993) is a Paralympic swimmer from Russia competing mainly in category S8 events. At the 2012 Summer Paralympics in London he won five medals, including gold in the 50 metre freestyle S8 event. He has represented Russia at two IPC World Championships with a total of 12 medals. At the 2015 IPC Swimming World Championships in Glasgow he set four world records, two as part of Russian relay teams and two individual records, in the 50m and 100m freestyle S8 events.

== Personal history ==
Tarasov was born with a congenital cerebral palsy. His father is a retired boxer, and his brother competed in swimming. He attends Saratov State University where he studies economics.

== Career history ==
Tarasov began swimming at the age of six, after his parents took him to the local pool to improve his general health. He progressed to swimming competitively, joining the Youth Adaptive Sports School Rehabilitation and Physical Education Club in Saratov. Before 2012 Tarasov was officially categorized as a S8 (freestyle, butterfly and backstroke) and SB7 (breaststroke) swimmer.

In 2012 Tasarov competed in his first major international competition when he was selected for the Russian team at the Summer Paralympics in London. Tarasov entered six events, winning medals in five of them. The highlight of his Games was his gold in the 50 m freestyle – S8, where in the heats he posted a time of 25.92, a world record. In the final Tarasov beat his own world record when he finished in 25.82, beating Maurice Deelen of the Netherlands by almost half a second. Along with his gold he left London with three silver medals, 100 m freestyle S8, 100 m backstroke S8, 4 × 100 m medley relay 34pts and a bronze in the 4 × 100 m freestyle relay 34pts.

The following year Tarasov was reselected to represent his country at the 2013 IPC Swimming World Championships in Montreal. There he successfully defended his place as the world's 50m freestyle champion posting a further world record of 25.81 in the final. He also added the 100m freestyle title and won three silvers in the 100m backstroke S8, 100m butterfly S8 and the 4x100 m medley relay (34pts) along with two bronze in the 4x50 m medley relay (20pts) and 4x100 m freestyle relay (34pts).

At the 2014 IPC Swimming European Championships held in Eindhoven, Tarasov was entered for seven events, winning medals in each. In the 50m freestyle S8 he bettered his world record set in Montreal by almost half a second, recording a time of 25.32. He won gold and set a further world record in the 100m freestyle S8 (56.27) and added a further two gold medals in the team relays. Tasarov added two silvers in the 100m butterfly and 400m freestyle and a bronze in the 100m backstroke.

In 2015 Tasarov travelled to Glasgow to participate in his second IPC Swimming World Championships and defend his world titles in the 50m and 100m freestyle events. He entered six events, winning five gold medals and ended as the tournament's third most successful competitor behind Brazil's Daniel Dias (7 gold, 1 silver) and Belarusian Ihar Boki (6 gold, 1 silver). In his favoured 50m freestyle S8, he took gold setting a Championship record of 25.34, just outside his own world best. In three of his other medals world records were broken. He swam a time of 55.84 in the 100m freestyle S8 beating his own record set in Eindhoven, and he was part of two world record breaking team relay teams, the 4 × 100 m freestyle relay and the 4 × 100 m medley relay. He completed his medal haul with gold in the 100m butterfly S8.
