= 2013 IPC Swimming World Championships – Women's 400 metre freestyle =

The women's 400 metre freestyle at the 2013 IPC Swimming World Championships was held at the Parc Jean Drapeau Aquatic Complex in Montreal from 12–18 August.

== Medalists ==
Class	Gold	Silver	Bronze
S6	Ellie Simmonds; Great Britain	Vianney Trejo Delgadillo; Mexico	Susana Ribeiro; Brazil
S7	Cortney Jordan; United States	Susannah Rodgers; Great Britain	Ani Palian; Ukraine
S8	Jessica Long; United States	Maddison Elliott; Australia	Amalie Vinther; Denmark
S10	Elodie Lorandi; France	Aurelie Rivard; Canada	Tully Kearney; Great Britain
S11	Daniela Schulte; Germany	Mary Fisher; New Zealand	Olga Iakibiuk; Ukraine
S12	Darya Stukalova; Russia	Deborah Font; Spain	Hannah Russell; Great Britain
S13	Rebecca Meyers; United States	Marta Gómez Battelli; Spain	Colleen Young; United States

== See also ==
- List of IPC world records in swimming
