= 2013 IPC Swimming World Championships – Men's 4 × 50 metre medley relay =

The men's 4 x 50 metre medley relay at the 2013 IPC Swimming World Championships was held at the Parc Jean Drapeau Aquatic Complex in Montreal from 12 to 18 August.

== Medalists ==
Points	Gold	Silver	Bronze
20 points	Dmytro Vynohradets S3; Oleksandr Komarov SB6; Yevheniy Bohodayko S7; Eskender Mustafaiev S4; Ukraine	Miguel Angel Martinez Tajuelo S3; Ricardo Ten SB4; Jaime Bailon Galindo S8; Sebastian Rodriguez S5; Spain	Dmitrii Kokarev S2; Alexey Fomenkov SB6; Denis Tarasov S8; Aleksei Lyzhikhin S4; Russia

== See also ==
- List of IPC world records in swimming
