= 2013 IPC Swimming World Championships – Men's 100 metre breaststroke =

The men's 100 metre breaststroke at the 2013 IPC Swimming World Championships was held at the Parc Jean Drapeau Aquatic Complex in Montreal from 12 to 18 August.

== Medalists ==
Class	Gold	Silver	Bronze
SB4	Moisés Fuentes; Colombia	Ricardo Ten; Spain	Antonios Tsapatakis; Greece
SB5	Roberto Rodriguez; Brazil	Pedro Rangel; Mexico	Niels Grunenberg; Germany
SB6	Yevheniy Bohodayko; Ukraine	Torben Schmidtke; Germany	Nelson Crispín; Colombia
SB7	Blake Cochrane; Australia	Simon Boer; Netherlands	Sascha Kindred; United Kingdom
SB8	Andriy Kalyna; Ukraine	Andreas Onea; Austria	Krzysztof Paterka; Poland
SB9	Kevin Paul; South Africa	SimLin Furong; China	Pavel Poltavtsev; Russia
SB11	Keiichi Kimura; Japan	Oleksandr Mashchenko; Ukraine	Israel Oliver; Spain
SB12	Uladzimir Izotau; Belarus	Maksym Veraksa; Ukraine	Sergey Punko; Russia
SB13	Oleksii Fedyna; Ukraine	Mikhail Zimin; Russia	Roman Dubovoy; Russia
SB14	Marc Evers; Netherlands	Yasuhiro Tanaka; Japan	Artem Pavlenko; Russia

== See also ==
- List of IPC world records in swimming
