= 2013 IPC Swimming World Championships – Men's 150 metre medley =

The men's 150 metre medley at the 2013 IPC Swimming World Championships was held at the Parc Jean Drapeau Aquatic Complex in Montreal from 12–18 August.

== Medalists ==
Class	Gold	Silver	Bronze
SM3	Dmytro Vynohradets; Ukraine	Grant Patterson; Australia	Arnulfo Castorena; Mexico
SM4	Cameron Leslie; New Zealand	Takayuki Suzuki; Japan	Jonas Larsen; Denmark

== See also ==
- List of IPC world records in swimming
