= 2013 IPC Swimming World Championships – Women's 100 metre backstroke =

The women's 100 metre backstroke at the 2013 IPC Swimming World Championships was held at the Parc Jean Drapeau Aquatic Complex in Montreal from 12–18 August.

== Medalists ==
Class	Gold	Silver	Bronze
S6	Anastasia Diodorova; Russia	Lu Dong; China	Julia Castello Farre; Spain
S7	Kirsten Bruhn; Germany	Cortney Jordan; United States	Sarah Mehain; Canada
S9	Stephanie Millward; United Kingdom	Amy Marren; United Kingdom	Elizabeth Smith; United States
S10	Sophie Pascoe; New Zealand	Nina Ryabova; Russia	Katherine Downie; Australia
S11	Mary Fisher; New Zealand	Daniela Schulte; Germany	Maryna Piddubna; Ukraine
S12	Hannah Russell; United Kingdom	Darya Stukalova; Russia	Yaryna Matlo; Ukraine
S13	Anna Krivshina; Russia	Colleen Young; United States	Teigan van Roosmalen; Australia
S14	Marlou van der Kulk; Netherlands	Bethany Firth; Ireland	Jessica-Jane Applegate; United Kingdom

== See also ==
- List of IPC world records in swimming
