= 2013 IPC Swimming World Championships – Women's 100 metre freestyle =

The women's 100 metre freestyle at the 2013 IPC Swimming World Championships was held at the Parc Jean Drapeau Aquatic Complex in Montreal from 12 to 18 August.

== Medalists ==
Class	Gold	Silver	Bronze
S2	Ganna Ielisavetska; Ukraine	Iryna Sotska; Ukraine	Daria Kopaieva; Ukraine
S3	Olga Sviderska; Ukraine	Xia Jiangbo; China	Zulfiya Gabidullina; Kazakhstan
S4	Nely Miranda Herrera; Mexico	Lisette Teunissen; Netherlands	Arjola Trimi; Italy
S5	Nataliia Prologaieva; Ukraine	Viktoriia Savtsova; Ukraine	Sarah Louise Rung; Norway
S6	Ellie Simmonds; United Kingdom	Emanuela Romano; Italy	Tanja Gröpper; Germany
S7	Cortney Jordan; United States	Susannah Rodgers; United Kingdom	Ani Palian; Ukraine
S8	Maddison Elliott; Australia	Jessica Long; United States	Amalie Vinther; Denmark
S9	Stephanie Millward; United Kingdom	Amy Marren; United Kingdom	Sarai Gascón Moreno; Spain
S10	Sophie Pascoe; New Zealand	Elodie Lorandi; France	Aurelie Rivard; Canada
S11	Mary Fisher; New Zealand	Daniela Schulte; Germany	Li Guizhi; China
S12	Darya Stukalova; Russia	Hannah Russell; United Kingdom	Naomi Maike Schnittger; Germany
S13	Valerie Grand-Maison; Canada	Rebecca Anne Meyers; United States	Anna Krivshina; Russia

== See also ==
- List of IPC world records in swimming
