= 2013 IPC Swimming World Championships – Women's 50 metre butterfly =

The women's 50 metre butterfly at the 2013 IPC Swimming World Championships was held at the Parc Jean Drapeau Aquatic Complex in Montreal from 12–18 August.

== Medalists ==
Class	Gold	Silver	Bronze
S3	Patricia Valle; Mexico	Alexandra Agafonova; Russia	Vera Thamm; Germany
S5	Sarah Louise Rung; Norway	Natalia Shavel; Belarus	Joana Maria Silva; Brazil
S6	Oksana Khrul; Ukraine	Anastasia Diodorova; Russia	Noga Nir-Kistler; United States
S7	Brianna Nelson; Canada	Susannah Rodgers; United Kingdom	Nikita Howarth; New Zealand

== See also ==
- List of IPC world records in swimming
