= 2013 IPC Swimming World Championships – Women's 4 × 50 metre medley relay =

The women's 4 x 50 metre medley relay at the 2013 IPC Swimming World Championships was held at the Parc Jean Drapeau Aquatic Complex in Montreal from 12 to 18 August.

== Medalists ==
Points	Gold	Silver	Bronze
20 points	Oksana Khrul S6; Nataliia Prologaieva SB4; Olena Fedota S6; Olga Sviderska S3; Ukraine	Anastasia Didorova S6; Ulyana Kuznetsova SB7; Alexandra Agafonova S3; Irina Kolmogorova S4; Russia	Alyssa Gialamas S5; Noga Nir-Kistler SB5; Reilly Boyt S6; Cheryl Angelelli S4; United States

== See also ==
- List of IPC world records in swimming
