= 2013 IPC Swimming World Championships – Men's 100 metre butterfly =

The men's 100 metre butterfly at the 2013 IPC Swimming World Championships was held at the Parc Jean Drapeau Aquatic Complex in Montreal from 12–18 August.

== Medalists ==
Class	Gold	Silver	Bronze
S8	Song Maodang; China	Denis Tarasov; Russia	Charles Rozoy; France
S9	Federico Morlacchi; Italy	Tamás Sors; Hungary	Matthew Cowdrey; Australia
S10	Andre Brasil; Brazil	Dmitry Grigoryev; Russia	David Levecq; Spain
S11	Oleksandr Mashchenko; Ukraine	Israel Oliver; Spain	Keiichi Kimura; Japan
S12	Roman Makarov; Russia	Danylo Chufarov; Ukraine	Anton Stabrovskyy; Ukraine
S13	Ihar Boki; Belarus	Roman Dubovoy; Russia	Tim Antalfy; Australia

== See also ==
- List of IPC world records in swimming
