= José Antonio Mari =

Spanish Paralympic swimmer (born 1988)

José Antonio Marí
Personal information
- Full name: José Antonio Marí Alcaraz-Garcia
- Nationality: Spain
- Born: 23 October 1988 (age 37) Valencia, Spain

Sport
- Sport: Swimming
Medal record
Men's para swimming
Representing Spain
Paralympic Games
Bronze medal – third place	2012 London	50m freestyle S9
Bronze medal – third place	2024 Paris	Mixed 4x100 medley - 34 points
World Championships
Silver medal – second place	2013 Montreal	50m freestyle S9
Silver medal – second place	2013 Montreal	100m freestyle S9
Bronze medal – third place	2013 Montreal	400m freestyle S9
European Championships
Gold medal – first place	2014 Eindhoven	100m breaststroke S9
Bronze medal – third place	2014 Eindhoven	4x100m medley 34pts
Bronze medal – third place	2016 Funchal	50m freestyle S9

José Antonio Marí Alcaraz-Garcia (born 23 October 1988) is a swimmer from Spain.

== Personal ==
Mari was born in Valencia. He has a mild physical disability. In 2012, he lived in San Cugat del Vallés, Barcelona.

== Swimming ==
Mari is an S10 classification swimmer. He is affiliated with theanish Federation of Sports for the Physically Disabled (FEDDF).

Mari competed at the 2008 Summer Paralympics. In 2010, he competed at the Tenerife International Open. He competed at the 2010 Adapted Swimming World Championship in the Netherlands, where he won three silver medals. In advance of the competition, he attended a swimming camp with the national team that was part of the Paralympic High Performance Program (HARP Program). He competed at the 2011 IPC European Swimming Championships in Berlin, Germany, where he finished first and set a European record in the 100m freestyle.

In 2012, Mari competed at the Paralympic Swimming Championship of Spain by Autonomous Communities. From the Catalan region of Spain, he was a recipient of a 2012 Plan ADO scholarship. He competed at the 2012 Summer Paralympics, and earned a bronze in the 50 meter S10 freestyle race. He competed at the 2013 IPC Swimming World Championships.

In 2018, he competed in the men's 100 metre freestyle S10 event at the 2018 Mediterranean Games held in Tarragona, Spain.
