= 2013 IPC Swimming World Championships – Men's 50 metre freestyle =

The men's 50 metre freestyle at the 2013 IPC Swimming World Championships was held at the Parc Jean Drapeau Aquatic Complex in Montreal from 12–18 August.

== Medalists ==
Class	Gold	Silver	Bronze
S3	Dmytro Vynohradets; Ukraine	Miguel Angel Martinez Tajuelo; Spain	Grant Patterson; Australia
S4	Eskender Mustafaiev; Ukraine	Gustavo Sanchez Martinez; Mexico	David Smetanine; France
S5	Daniel Dias; Brazil	Roy Perkins; United States	Sebastian Rodriguez; Spain
S6	Xu Qing; China	Zheng Tao; China	Nelson Crispín; Colombia
S7	Matthew Walker; United Kingdom	Josef Craig; United Kingdom	Yevheniy Bohodayko; Ukraine
S8	Denis Tarasov; Russia	Konstantin Lisenkov; Russia	Charles Rozoy; France
S9	Matthew Cowdrey; Australia	Jose Antonio Mari Alcaraz; Spain	Leo Lahteenmaki; Finland
S10	Andre Brasil; Brazil	Phelipe Andrews Melo Rodrigues; Brazil	Ian Jaryd Silverman; United States
S11	Alexander Chekurov; Russia	Keiichi Kimura; Japan	Hendri Herbst; South Africa
S12	Maksym Veraksa; Ukraine	Aleksandr Nevolin-Svetov; Russia	Tucker Dupree; United States
S13	Iaroslav Denysenko; Ukraine	Charles Bouwer; South Africa	Oleksii Fedyna; Ukraine

== See also ==
- List of IPC world records in swimming
