= 2013 IPC Swimming World Championships – Men's 4 × 100 metre freestyle relay =

The men's 4 x 100 metre freestyle relay at the 2013 IPC Swimming World Championships was held at the Parc Jean Drapeau Aquatic Complex in Montreal from 12–18 August.

== Medalists ==
Points	Gold	Silver	Bronze
34 pts	Rowan Crothers S9; Matthew Cowdrey S9; Matthew Levy S7; Brenden Hall S9; Australia	Phelipe Andrews Melo Rodrigues S10; Daniel Dias S5; Ruiter Silva S9; Andre Brasil S10; Brazil	Alexander Markelov S8; Konstantin Lisenkov S8; Denis Tarasov S8; Dmitry Grigoryev S10; Russia

== See also ==
- List of IPC world records in swimming
