= Joana Neves =

Brazilian Paralympic swimmer (1987–2024)

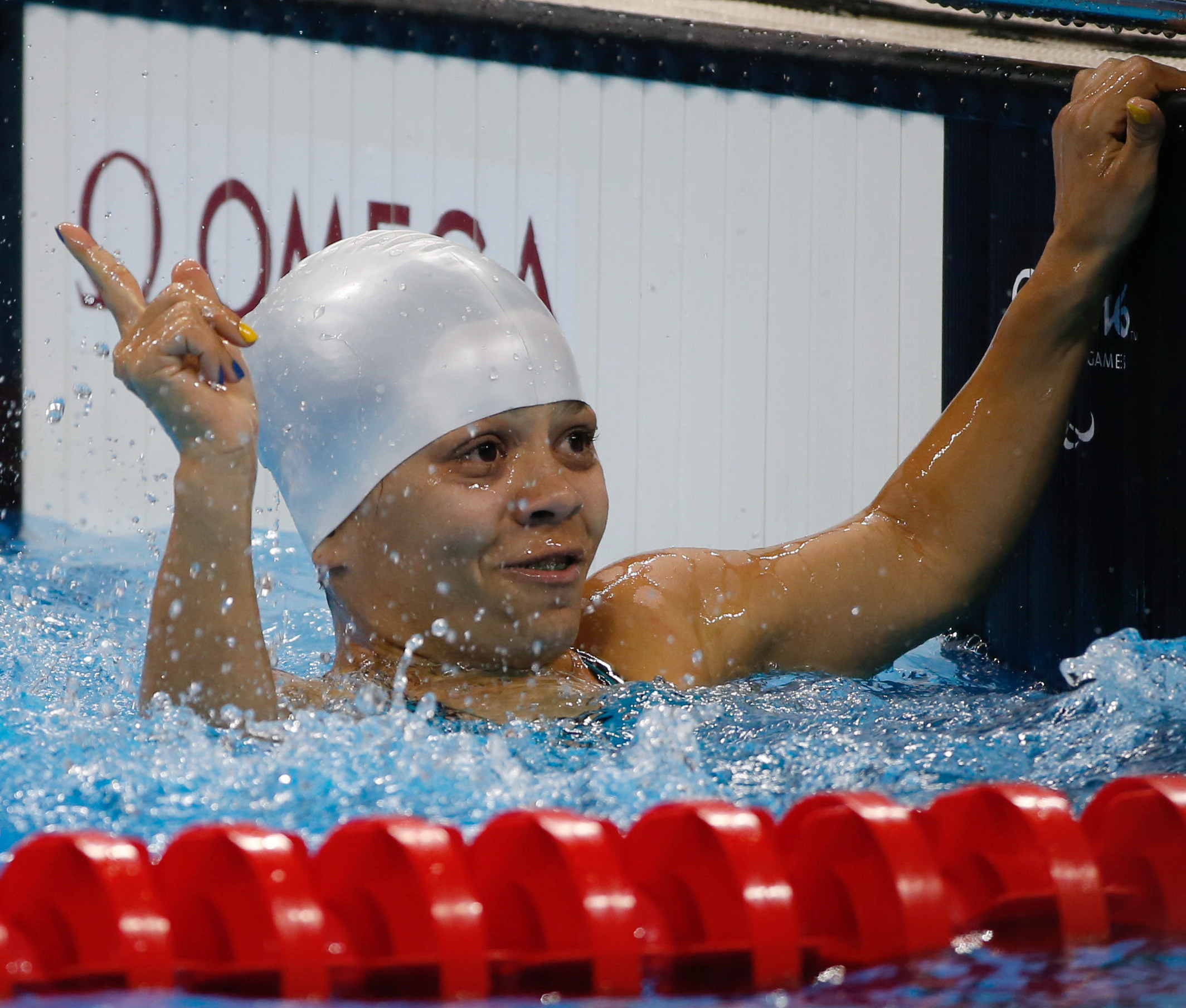
- Neves at the 2016 Paralympics

Personal information
- Full name: Joana Maria Jaciara da Silva Neves Euzébio
- Born: 14 February 1987 Natal, Rio Grande do Norte, Brazil
- Died: 18 March 2024 (aged 37)

Sport
- Sport: Swimming
- Disability class: S5
Medal record
Representing Brazil
Paralympic Games
Silver medal – second place	2016 Rio de Janeiro	50 m freestyle S5
Silver medal – second place	2016 Rio de Janeiro	Mixed 4×50 m freestyle 20pts
Bronze medal – third place	2012 London	50 m butterfly S5
Bronze medal – third place	2016 Rio de Janeiro	100 m freestyle S5
Bronze medal – third place	2020 Tokyo	Mixed 4×50m freestyle relay 20pts
World Championships
Gold medal – first place	2015 Glasgow	50 m freestyle S5
Gold medal – first place	2015 Glasgow	Mixed 4×50 m freestyle 20pts
Silver medal – second place	2010 Eindhoven	4×50 m freestyle 20pts
Silver medal – second place	2022 Madeira	50m freestyle S5
Bronze medal – third place	2010 Eindhoven	50 m butterfly S5
Bronze medal – third place	2013 Montreal	50 m butterfly S5
Bronze medal – third place	2013 Montreal	50 m freestyle S5
Bronze medal – third place	2013 Montreal	200 m freestyle S5
Bronze medal – third place	2015 Glasgow	100 m freestyle S5
Bronze medal – third place	2022 Madeira	50 m butterfly S5
Bronze medal – third place	2022 Madeira	100 m freestyle S5
Parapan American Games
Gold medal – first place	2011 Guadalajara	50m freestyle S5
Gold medal – first place	2011 Guadalajara	100m freestyle S5
Gold medal – first place	2011 Guadalajara	200m freestyle S5
Gold medal – first place	2011 Guadalajara	50m butterfly S5
Gold medal – first place	2015 Toronto	50m freestyle S5
Gold medal – first place	2015 Toronto	100m freestyle S5
Gold medal – first place	2015 Toronto	200m freestyle S5
Gold medal – first place	2015 Toronto	50m butterfly S5
Gold medal – first place	2019 Lima	50m freestyle S5
Gold medal – first place	2019 Lima	100m freestyle S5
Gold medal – first place	2019 Lima	200m freestyle S5
Gold medal – first place	2019 Lima	50m butterfly S5
Silver medal – second place	2019 Lima	200m individual medley SM5

Joana Maria Jaciara da Silva Neves Euzébio (14 February 1987 – 18 March 2024) was a Brazilian Paralympic swimmer. She won five paralympic medals.

== Life ==
Neves was born in Rio Grande do Norte in 1987. She competing as a teenager and by the age of fourteen she was in international competitions.

She competed at the 2012, 2016, and 2020 Paralympics and won two silver and three bronze medals. In 2015, she became the first Brazilian woman to win an individual gold medal at the IPC World Championships, which she accomplished in the 50 m freestyle.

Neves died on 18 March 2024, at the age of 37.
