= 2013 IPC Swimming World Championships – Men's 50 metre breaststroke =

The men's 50 metre breaststroke at the 2013 IPC Swimming World Championships was held at the Parc Jean Drapeau Aquatic Complex in Montreal from 12 to 18 August.

== Medalists ==
Class	Gold	Silver	Bronze
SB2	Ioannis Kostakis; Greece	Arnulfo Castorena; Mexico	Dmytro Vynohradets; Ukraine
SB3	Takayuki Suzuki; Japan	Miguel Luque; Spain	Michael Schoenmaker; Netherlands

== See also ==
- List of IPC world records in swimming
