= 2013 IPC Swimming World Championships – Men's 4 × 50 metre freestyle relay =

The men's 4 x 50 metre freestyle relay at the 2013 IPC Swimming World Championships was held at the Parc Jean Drapeau Aquatic Complex in Montreal from 12–18 August.

== Medalists ==
Points	Gold	Silver	Bronze
20 pts	Ronystony Cordeiro da Silva S4; Adriano de Lima S6; Clodoaldo Silva S5; Daniel Dias S5; Brazil	Iaroslav Semenenko S6; Eskender Mustafaiev S4; Dmytro Vynohradets S3; Yevheniy Bohodayko S7; Ukraine	Dmitrii Kokarev S2; Andrey Gladkov S7; Aleksei Lyzhikhin S4; Sergey Sukharev S7; Russia

== See also ==
- List of IPC world records in swimming
