= 2013 IPC Swimming World Championships – Women's 50 metre breaststroke =

The women's 50 metre breaststroke at the 2013 IPC Swimming World Championships was held at the Parc Jean Drapeau Aquatic Complex in Montreal from 12 to 18 August.

== Medalists ==
Class	Gold	Silver	Bronze
SB2	Vera Thamm; Germany	Jennie Ekström; Sweden	Haidee Viviana Aceves Perez; Mexico

== See also ==
- List of IPC world records in swimming
