= 2013 IPC Swimming World Championships – Men's 4 × 100 metre medley relay =

The men's 4 x 100 metre medley relay at the 2013 IPC Swimming World Championships was held at the Parc Jean Drapeau Aquatic Complex in Montreal from 12–18 August.

== Medalists ==
Points	Gold	Silver	Bronze
34 points	Liu Xiaobing S9; Lin Furong SB9; Song Maodang S8; Wang Yinan S8; China	Konstantin Lisenkov S8; Dmitry Grigoryev SB9; Alexander Skaliukh S9; Denis Tarasov S8; Russia	Iurii Bozhynskyi S8; Andriy Kalyna SB8; Maksym Isaiev S10; Bohdan Hrynenko S8; Ukraine

== See also ==
- List of IPC world records in swimming
