= 2013 IPC Swimming World Championships – Women's 100 metre butterfly =

The women's 100 metre butterfly at the 2013 IPC Swimming World Championships was held at the Parc Jean Drapeau Aquatic Complex in Montreal from 12–18 August.

== Medalists ==
Class	Gold	Silver	Bronze
S8	Jessica Long; United States	Stephanie Slater; United Kingdom	Kateryna Istomina; Ukraine
S9	Amy Marren; United Kingdom	Sarai Gascón Moreno; Spain	Ellen Keane; Ireland
S10	Sophie Pascoe; New Zealand	Oliwia Jablonska; Poland	Élodie Lorandi; France
S11	Mary Fisher; New Zealand	Olga Iakibiuk; Ukraine	Maja Reichard; Sweden
S12	Darya Stukalova; Russia	Hannah Russell; United Kingdom	Carla Casals; Spain
S13	Valerie Grand-Maison; Canada	Rebecca Anne Meyers; United States	Teigan van Roosmalen; Australia

== See also ==
- List of IPC world records in swimming
