= 2013 IPC Swimming World Championships – Women's 150 metre medley =

The women's 150 metre medley at the 2013 IPC Swimming World Championships was held at the Parc Jean Drapeau Aquatic Complex in Montreal from 12–18 August.

== Medalists ==
Class	Gold	Silver	Bronze
SM3	Olga Sviderska; Ukraine	Jennie Ekström; Sweden	Patricia Valle; Mexico
SM4	Irina Kolmogorova; Russia	Lisette Teunissen; Netherlands	Karolina Hamer; Poland

== See also ==
- List of IPC world records in swimming
