= 2013 IPC Swimming World Championships – Men's 50 metre backstroke =

The men's 50 metre backstroke at the 2013 IPC Swimming World Championships was held at the Parc Jean Drapeau Aquatic Complex in Montreal from 12–18 August.

== Medalists ==
Class	Gold	Silver	Bronze
S1	Hennadii Boiko; Ukraine	Anton Kol; Ukraine	Christos Tampaxis; Greece
S2	Dmitrii Kokarev; Russia	Serhii Palamarchuk; Ukraine	Aristeidis Makrodimitris; Greece
S3	Dmytro Vynohradets; Ukraine	Miguel Angel Martinez Tajuelo; Spain	Mikael Fredriksson; Sweden
S4	Juan Reyes; Mexico	Arnost Petracek; Czech Republic	Gustavo Sanchez Martinez; Mexico
S5	Daniel Dias; Brazil	Andrew Mullen; United Kingdom	Cameron Leslie; New Zealand

== See also ==
- List of IPC world records in swimming
