= 2013 IPC Swimming World Championships – Women's 50 metre backstroke =

The women's 50 metre backstroke at the 2013 IPC Swimming World Championships was held at the Parc Jean Drapeau Aquatic Complex in Montreal from 12 to 18 August.

== Medalists ==
Class	Gold	Silver	Bronze
S2	Ganna Ielisavetska; Ukraine	Iryna Sotska; Ukraine	Darya Kopayeva; Ukraine
S3	Olga Sviderska; Ukraine	Yip Pin Xiu; Singapore	Zulfiya Gabidullina; Kazakhstan
S4	Lisette Teunissen; Netherlands	Edenia Garcia; Brazil	Bai Juan; China
S5	Nataliia Prologaieva; Ukraine	Katerina Lislova; Czech Republic	Natalia Shavel; Belarus

== See also ==
- List of IPC world records in swimming
