= Miguel Ángel Martínez (swimmer) =

Spanish Paralympic swimmer

Personal information
- Full name: Miguel Ángel Martínez Tajuelo
- Nationality: Spain
- Born: 19 April 1984 (age 42) Spain

Sport
- Sport: Swimming
- Strokes: Backstroke
- Club: Club Fidias
Medal record
Men's para swimming
Representing Spain
World Championships
Silver medal – second place	2010 Eindhoven	50m backstroke S3
Silver medal – second place	2013 Montreal	50m freestyle S3
Silver medal – second place	2013 Montreal	50m backstroke S3
Silver medal – second place	2013 Montreal	100m freestyle S3
Silver medal – second place	2013 Montreal	200m freestyle S3
Silver medal – second place	2013 Montreal	4x50m relay 20pts
European Championships
Silver medal – second place	2009 Reykjavik	50 m backstroke S3
Silver medal – second place	2014 Eindhoven	100m freestyle S3
Silver medal – second place	2014 Eindhoven	200m freestyle S3
Bronze medal – third place	2009 Reykjavik	50 m freestyle S3
Bronze medal – third place	2016 Funchal	50m backstroke S3

Miguel Ángel Martínez Tajuelo (born 19 April 1984) is a Paralympic swimmer from Spain. He competed at both the 2008 and 2012 Summer Paralympics and is a European and World Championships medaling competitor.

== Personal ==
Martínez is from Andalusia. In 2010, he was a guest of ONCE for a special screening of the documentary, "La Teoría del Espiralismo", about the lives of Paralympic sportspeople. He spoke before the screening of the film.

== Swimming ==
Martínez is an S3 swimmer, and is a member of Club Fidias. He started competitive swimming in 2006.

Martínez competed in the 2008 Summer Paralympics where he competed in three events. Following the Games, he and other Seville Olympians and Paralympians were special guests at a function hosted by the Minister of Tourism, Trade and Sport of the Junta de Andalucía, Luciano Alonso. The Beijing Games were his Paralympic debut. He qualified for the Games in April of that year, and attended a national team training camp in the Canary Islands around that time.

Martínez was one of 42 Spanish team members at the 2009 IPC European Swimming Championships, of which 22 Spanish competitors had physical disabilities, 6 had cerebral palsy, 10 were blind and four had intellectual disabilities. He competed at the 2010 Adapted Swimming World Championship in the Netherlands. He finished second in the 50 meter backstroke. He competed at the 2011 IPC European Swimming Championships in Berlin, Germany, where he won a gold medal in the 4x50 meter medley relay, a silver in 50 meter backstroke and bronze medal in 200 meter freestyle.

In March 2012, Martínez qualified for the 2012 Summer Paralympics at London, representing Spain in the 50 metre backstroke S3. At the Paralympics he came through heat 2 in a comfortable qualifying time, but just missed a podium finish when he came fourth in a time of 51.83. In 2012, he competed at the Paralympic Swimming Championship of Spain by Autonomous Communities. He set a national record at the event in the 50 meter backstroke. He competed at the 2013 IPC Swimming World Championships winning four individual and a team silver medal; in each of his races he saw Russian rival Dmytro Vynohradets take the gold medal.
