= 2013 IPC Swimming World Championships – Women's 200 metre freestyle =

The women's 200 metre freestyle at the 2013 IPC Swimming World Championships was held at the Parc Jean Drapeau Aquatic Complex in Montreal from 12–18 August.

== Medalists ==
Class	Gold	Silver	Bronze
S3	Olga Sviderska; Ukraine	Patricia Valle; Mexico	Haidee Viviana Aceves Perez; Mexico
S4	Nely Miranda Herrera; Mexico	Lisette Teunissen; Netherlands	Arjola Trimi; Italy
S5	Sarah Louise Rung; Norway	Inbal Pezaro; Israel	Joana Maria Silva; Brazil
S14	Jessica-Jane Applegate; United Kingdom	Bethany Firth; Ireland	Taylor Corry; Australia

== See also ==
- List of IPC world records in swimming
