= 2013 IPC Swimming World Championships – Men's 100 metre backstroke =

The men's 100 metre backstroke at the 2013 IPC Swimming World Championships was held at the Parc Jean Drapeau Aquatic Complex in Montreal from 12–18 August.

== Medalists ==
Class	Gold	Silver	Bronze
S6	Zheng Tao; China	Jia Hongguang; China	Iaroslav Semenenko; Ukraine
S7	Jonathan Fox; United Kingdom	Andrey Gladkov; Russia	Yevheniy Bohodayko; Ukraine
S8	Konstantin Lisenkov; Russia	Denis Tarasov; Russia	Oliver Hynd; United Kingdom
S9	Matthew Cowdrey; Australia	James Crisp; United Kingdom	Laurence McGivern; Ireland
S10	Justin Zook; United States	Andre Brasil; Brazil	Kardo Ploomipuu; Estonia
S12	Aleksandr Nevolin-Svetov; Russia	Tucker Dupree; United States	Sergii Klippert; Ukraine
S13	Ihar Boki; Belarus	Iaroslav Denysenko; Ukraine	Charl Bouwer; South Africa
S14	Marc Evers; Netherlands	Inkook Lee; South Korea	Aaron Moores; United Kingdom

== See also ==
- List of IPC world records in swimming
