= 2013 IPC Swimming World Championships – Men's 400 metre freestyle =

The men's 400 metre freestyle at the 2013 IPC Swimming World Championships was held at the Parc Jean Drapeau Aquatic Complex in Montreal from 12–18 August.

== Medalists ==
Men's 400 metre freestyle medalists per disability class
Class	Gold	Silver	Bronze
S6	Darragh McDonald; Ireland	Nelson Crispín; Colombia	Kyosuke Oyama; Japan
S7	Josef Craig; United Kingdom	Andrey Gladkov; Russia	Jonathan Fox; United Kingdom
S8	Oliver Hynd; United Kingdom	Sam Hynd; United Kingdom	Wang Yinan; China
S9	Brenden Hall; Australia	Federico Morlacchi; Italy	Jose Antonio Mari Alcaraz; Spain
S10	Ian Jaryd Silverman; United States	Robert Welbourn; United Kingdom	Dmitry Bartasinskiy; Russia
S11	Israel Oliver; Spain	Matheus Rheine; Brazil	Dmytro Zalevskyy; Ukraine
S12	Danylo Chufarov; Ukraine	Sergey Punko; Russia	James Clegg; United Kingdom
S13	Ihar Boki; Belarus	Iaroslav Denysenko; Ukraine	Charl Bouwer; South Africa

== See also ==
- List of IPC world records in swimming
