= Arjola Trimi =

Italian Paralympic swimmer

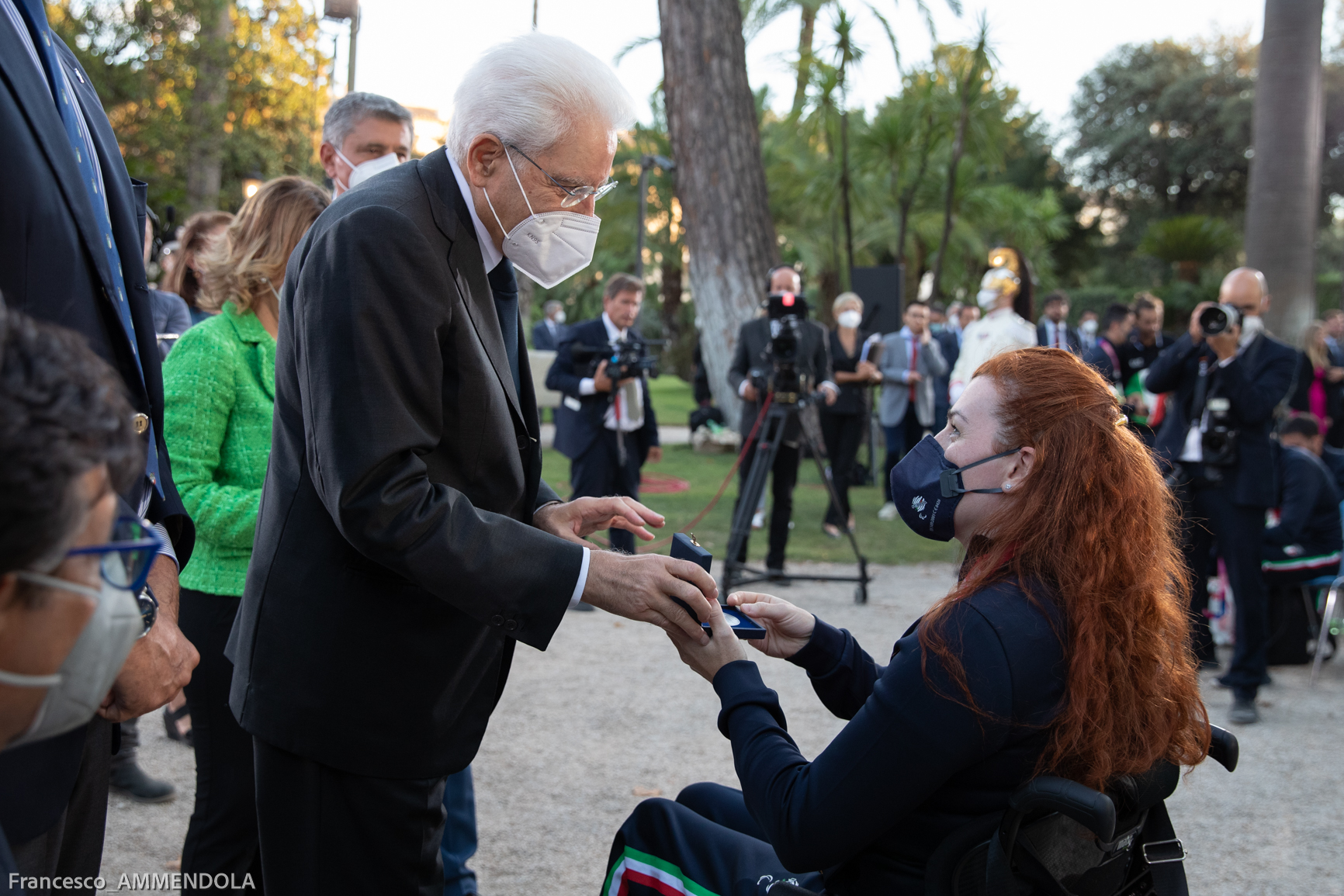
- Trimi awarded by the Italian President Sergio Mattarella at Quirinale Palace in 2021.

Personal information
- National team: Italy
- Born: 15 March 1987 (age 39) Tirana, Albania
- Height: 1.80 m (5 ft 11 in)
- Weight: 55 kg (121 lb)

Sport
- Sport: Paralympic swimming
- Disability class: S4
- Club: Pol Bresciana No Frontiere
Medal record
Paralympic swimming
Representing Italy
Event	1st	2nd	3rd
Paralympics	2	3	0
World Championships	4	5	5
European Championships	13	5	3
Total	19	13	8
Paralympic Games
Gold medal – first place	2020 Tokyo	50 m backstroke S3
Gold medal – first place	2020 Tokyo	100 m freestyle S3
Silver medal – second place	2016 Rio	50 m freestyle S4
Silver medal – second place	2020 Tokyo	50 m freestyle S4
Silver medal – second place	2020 Tokyo	Mixed 4×50 m freestyle
World Championships
Gold medal – first place	2015 Glasgow	50m backstroke S4
Gold medal – first place	2019 London	50m Freestyle S4
Gold medal – first place	2019 London	100m Freestyle S4
Gold medal – first place	2025 Singapore	200m freestyle S2
Silver medal – second place	2013 Montreal	4×50m freestyle relay
Silver medal – second place	2013 Montreal	50m freestyle S4
Silver medal – second place	2015 Glasgow	50m freestyle S4
Bronze medal – third place	2013 Montreal	100m freestyle S4
Bronze medal – third place	2013 Montreal	200m freestyle S4
Bronze medal – third place	2019 London	150m Medley SM4
Bronze medal – third place	2019 London	50m Backstroke S4
Bronze medal – third place	2025 Singapore	50m backstroke S2
European Championships
Gold medal – first place	2014 Eindhoven	50m freestyle S4
Gold medal – first place	2014 Eindhoven	100m freestyle S4
Gold medal – first place	2014 Eindhoven	200m freestyle S4
Gold medal – first place	2016 Funchal	50 m freestyle S4
Gold medal – first place	2016 Funchal	100 m freestyle S4
Gold medal – first place	2016 Funchal	200 m freestyle S4
Silver medal – second place	2016 Funchal	50 m backstroke S4
Silver medal – second place	2016 Funchal	Mixed 50m medley
Silver medal – second place	2016 Funchal	4x50m freestyle
Bronze medal – third place	2014 Eindhoven	4x50m freestyle
Bronze medal – third place	2016 Funchal	50 m breaststroke SB3

Arjola Trimi (born 15 March 1987) is an Italian Paralympic swimmer competing in S4 classification events. She competed at the 2016 Summer Paralympics, and 2020 Summer Paralympics, in Women's 4 × 50 mixed freestyle relay, winning a silver medal.

She made her major international debut at the 2013 IPC Swimming World Championships in Montreal, where she won four medals. A year later she became European champion in her classification in the 50m, 100m and 200m freestyle events. In 2015, she won her first World gold taking the 50m backstroke title at the World Games in Glasgow.

== Personal history ==
Trimi was born in Tirana, Albania, her family is Albanian. She has an acquired form of degenerative muscular condition which has resulted in quadriplegia and muscle contractions.

== Swimming career ==
Trimi learnt to swim as a baby, but always saw it as a hobby that helped her relax. She took part in several sports, such as wheelchair basketball and athletics, but it was not until her medical condition worsened that she turned to swimming as a competitive event. She took up swimming competitively in 2013 and was initially classified as a S5 athlete; but was reclassified soon after as S4. That same year she was chosen to represent Italy at the 2013 IPC Swimming World Championships in Montreal. There she won four medals: silvers in the 50m freestyle and the 50m 4x50 freestyle relay, and bronze in both the 100m and 200m freestyle S4 races.

In 2014, she won her first senior international gold medals, becoming European champion in the 50m, 100m and 200m freestyle events at the 2014 IPC Swimming European Championships in Eindhoven. A year later she was back in the Italian squad, this time in the World Championships in Glasgow. Trimi won two medals, a silver in the 50m Freestyle and gold in the 50m backstroke, making her World champion in the event.

At the 2025 World Para Swimming Championships in Singapore, Trimi, who has previously competed in the S4 classification, won the women's 200 m freestyle S2 and set a new world record with a time of 4:24.56, surpassing her previous mark of 4:35.36.

== See also ==
- Italy at the 2016 Summer Paralympics
- Italy at the 2020 Summer Paralympics
