= 2015 IPC Swimming World Championships – Mixed 4 × 50 metre freestyle relay =

The Mixed 50 metre x 4 freestyle at the 2015 IPC Swimming World Championships was held at the Tollcross International Swimming Centre in Glasgow, United Kingdom from 13–17 July.

As with other disability relay events, the freestyle works on a points system whereby the classification numbers of each swimmer are totaled to give a number no higher than 20. This was the first time the World Championships have included a mixed sex event, after its successful introduction in the 2014 IPC European Swimming Championships. The race requires each team to be made up of two male and two female competitors.

== Medalists ==
Event	Gold		Silver		Bronze	
20pts	Clodoaldo Silva S5; Joana Maria Silva S5; Esthefany Rodrigues S5; Daniel Dias S5; Brazil	2:29.80; WR	Bohdan Hrynenko S8; Olga Sviderska S3; Yelyzaveta Mereshko S6; Dmytro Vynohradets S3; Ukraine	2:37.63	Eskender Mustafaev S4; Irina Deviatova S5; Roman Zhdanov S4; Ani Palian S7; Russia	2:37.95

Legend
WR: World record, CR: Championship record, AF: Africa record, AM: Americas record, AS: Asian record, EU: European record, OS: Oceania record

== See also ==
- List of IPC world records in swimming
