= Olga Sviderska =

Ukrainian Paralympic swimmer

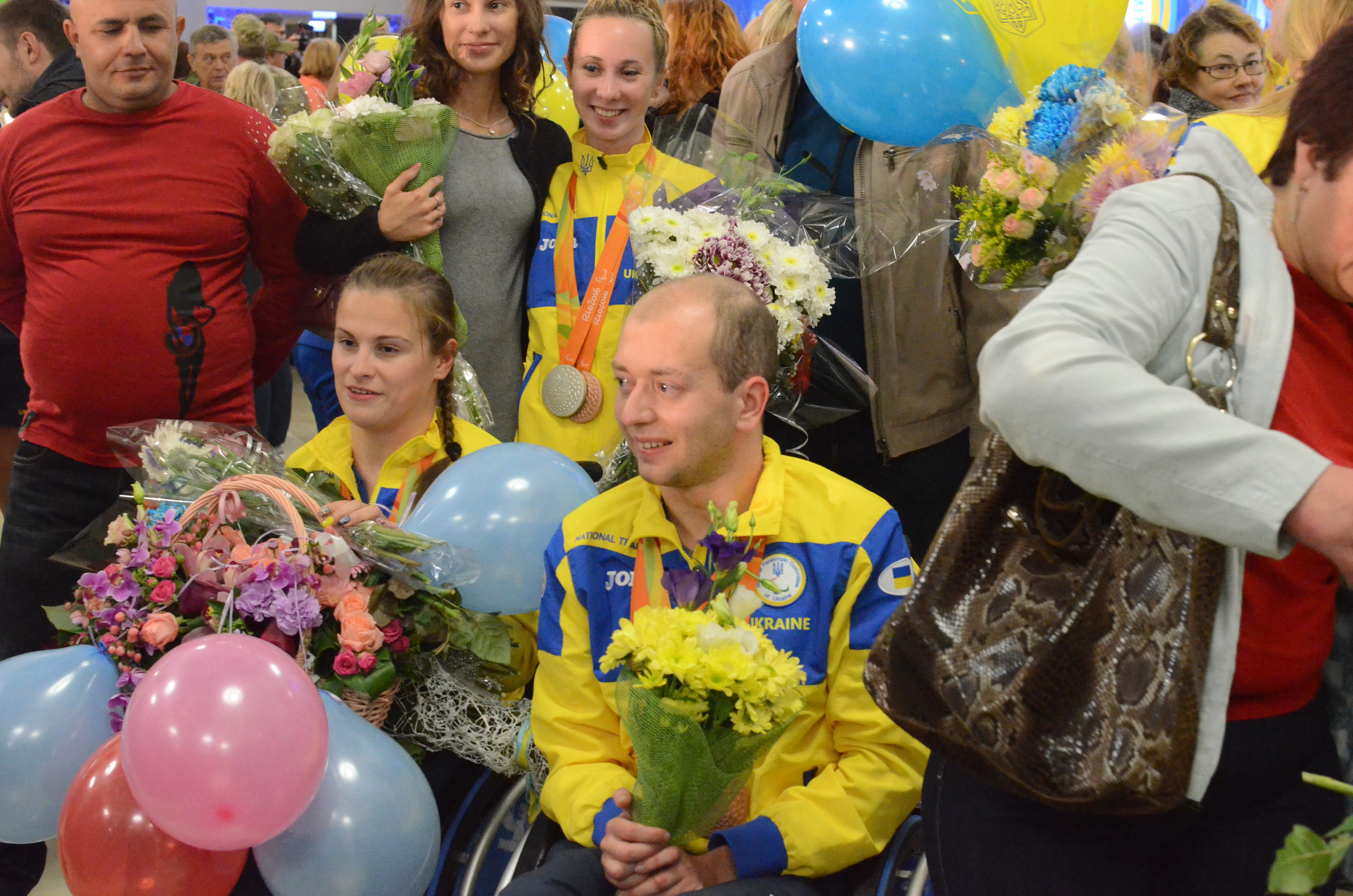

Personal information
- Full name: Olga Sviderska
- Born: 2 October 1989 (age 36)

Sport
- Sport: Swimming
Medal record
Women's para swimming
Representing Ukraine
Paralympic Games
Silver medal – second place	2012 London	50 m freestyle S3
Silver medal – second place	2012 London	100 m freestyle S3
Bronze medal – third place	2016 Rio	Mixed 4×50 m freestyle
IPC World Championships
Gold medal – first place	2013 Montreal	50 m freestyle S3
Gold medal – first place	2013 Montreal	50 m backstroke S3
Gold medal – first place	2013 Montreal	100 m freestyle S3
Gold medal – first place	2013 Montreal	150 m medley S3
Gold medal – first place	2013 Montreal	200 m freestyle S3
Gold medal – first place	2013 Montreal	4×50 m freestyle
Gold medal – first place	2013 Montreal	4×50 m medley
Silver medal – second place	2015 Glasgow	Mixed 4×50 m freestyle
Silver medal – second place	2015 Glasgow	100 m freestyle S3
Bronze medal – third place	2015 Glasgow	50 m backstroke S3
Bronze medal – third place	2015 Glasgow	150 m medley SM4
IPC European Championships
Gold medal – first place	2014 Eindhoven	4×50 m freestyle 20pts
Gold medal – first place	2014 Eindhoven	4×50 m medley 20pts
Gold medal – first place	2016 Funchal	50m freestyle S3
Gold medal – first place	2016 Funchal	100 m freestyle S3
Gold medal – first place	2016 Funchal	50 m backstroke S3
Gold medal – first place	2016 Funchal	50 m breaststroke SB3
Silver medal – second place	2016 Funchal	150 m medley SM4
Bronze medal – third place	2014 Eindhoven	100 m freestyle S4
Bronze medal – third place	2014 Eindhoven	50 m freestyle S4
Bronze medal – third place	2014 Eindhoven	150 m medley SM4
Bronze medal – third place	2016 Funchal	200 m freestyle S4

Olga Sviderska (born 2 October 1989) is a Ukrainian Paralympic swimmer. She won two silver medals at the 2012 Summer Paralympics and one bronze medal at the 2016 Summer Paralympics. She won seven gold medals, including five individual golds, at the 2013 IPC Swimming World Championships in Montreal.

In 2014 she was nominated for the Laureus World Sports Award for Sportsperson of the Year with a Disability award.
