= Mary Fisher (swimmer) =

New Zealand Paralympic swimmer

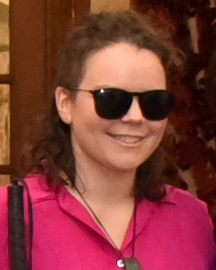
- Fisher in 2020

Personal information
- Full name: Mary Elizabeth Fisher
- Born: 16 January 1993 (age 33) Lower Hutt, New Zealand

Sport
- Sport: Swimming
- Classifications: S11, SB11, SM11
- Club: Capital Swimming club
Medal record
Women's para swimming
Representing New Zealand
Paralympic Games
Gold medal – first place	2012 London	200m medley SM11
Gold medal – first place	2016 Rio	100m backstroke S11
Silver medal – second place	2012 London	100m freestyle S11
Silver medal – second place	2012 London	100m backstroke S11
Bronze medal – third place	2012 London	50m freestyle S11
World Championships
Gold medal – first place	2013 Montreal	100m backstroke S11
Gold medal – first place	2013 Montreal	50m freestyle S11
Gold medal – first place	2013 Montreal	100m freestyle S11
Gold medal – first place	2013 Montreal	100m butterfly S11
Gold medal – first place	2013 Montreal	200m medley SM11
Gold medal – first place	2015 Glasgow	100m backstroke S11
Gold medal – first place	2015 Glasgow	100m freestyle S11
Gold medal – first place	2015 Glasgow	200m medley SM11
Silver medal – second place	2013 Montreal	400m freestyle S11
Silver medal – second place	2015 Glasgow	400m freestyle S11
Silver medal – second place	2015 Glasgow	50m freestyle S11

Mary Elizabeth Fisher MNZM (born 16 January 1993) is a New Zealand para swimmer. She represented New Zealand at the 2012 Summer Paralympics in London and the 2016 Summer Paralympics in Rio de Janeiro, combined winning two gold medals, two silver medals and a bronze medal.

Fisher was born in Lower Hutt and grew up in the nearby Upper Hutt suburb of Silverstream. She was born with the rare genetic condition aniridia, resulting in low vision which deteriorated as a teenager. She attended Silverstream Primary School, Maidstone Intermediate and Heretaunga College. She is a student at the Wellington campus of Massey University.

Fisher began swimming for enjoyment as a nine year old and trained at the Upper Hutt Swim Club until completing high school in 2010. Her goal of swimming at the London 2012 Paralympics was bolstered by meeting coach Luke Clark and she moved to Wellington city to train under his guidance. After his departure overseas Fisher relocated to the North Shore in Auckland following the 2015 IPC Swimming World Championships in Glasgow. She is classified S11 for totally blind swimmers in freestyle, backstroke and breaststroke; SB11 for breaststroke, and SM11 for individual medley.

At the 2012 Summer Paralympics, Fisher won the gold medal in the 200 m individual medley SM11 in a world record time of 2:46.91. She also won silver medals in the 100 m freestyle and the 100 m backstroke, and the bronze medal in the 50 m freestyle S11.

She won five gold medals and a silver at the 2013 IPC Swimming World Championships in Montreal.

In 2015, she won three gold and two silver medals at the IPC Swimming World Championships in Glasgow, qualifying her for the 2016 Summer Paralympics in Rio de Janeiro. She was officially confirmed to represent New Zealand at the Paralympics on 5 May 2016.

At the 2016 Summer Paralympics, Fisher won the gold medal in the women's 100m backstroke S11 in a world record time of 1:17.96.

In the 2013 New Year Honours, Fisher was appointed a Member of the New Zealand Order of Merit for services to swimming. She was named 2014 Disabled Sportsperson of the Year at the annual Halberg Awards.

Fisher announced her retirement from competitive swimming in November 2018.

== Personal bests ==
Event	Time	Location	Date	Notes
50 m freestyle (S11)	31.35	Rio de Janeiro, Brazil	13 September 2016	AR
100 m freestyle (S11)	1:09.47	Rio de Janeiro, Brazil	15 September 2016	AR
200 m freestyle (S11)	2:35.31	Berlin, Germany	9 June 2016	AR
400 m freestyle (S11)	5:22.09	London, United Kingdom	7 September 2012	AR
50 m backstroke (S11)	36.96	Berlin, Germany	10 June 2016	AR
100 m backstroke (S11)	1:17.96	Rio de Janeiro, Brazil	9 September 2016	WR
200 m backstroke (S11)	2:54.46	Berlin, Germany	9 June 2016	AR
100 m breaststroke (SB11)	1:38.25	Glasgow, United Kingdom	18 July 2016	AR
50 m butterfly (S11)	32.92	Auckland, New Zealand	1 April 2016	WR
100 m butterfly (S11)	1:15.17	Auckland, New Zealand	22 March 2013	WR
200 m butterfly (S11)	2:50.93	Auckland, New Zealand	20 March 2013	WR
200 m individual medley (SM11)	2:46.91	London, United Kingdom	8 September 2012	WR

Awards
Preceded by Sophie Pascoe	Halberg Awards – Disabled Sportsperson of the Year; 2014	Succeeded by Sophie Pascoe
