= Darko Đurić =

Slovenian Paralympic swimmer

Personal information
- Born: 11 September 1989 (age 36) Maribor, Slovenia

Sport
- Country: Slovenia
- Sport: Paralympic swimming
- Disability class: S4
Medal record
Paralympic swimming
Representing Slovenia
World Championships
Gold medal – first place	2013 Montreal	50m butterfly S4
Gold medal – first place	2013 Montreal	100m freestyle S4
Silver medal – second place	2013 Montreal	200m freestyle S4
European Championships
Gold medal – first place	2018 Dublin	50m freestyle S4
Silver medal – second place	2011 Berlin	50m butterfly S4
Silver medal – second place	2016 Funchal	100m freestyle S4
Bronze medal – third place	2016 Funchal	200m freestyle S4
Bronze medal – third place	2018 Dublin	200m freestyle S4

Darko Đurić (born 11 September 1989) is a retired Slovenian Paralympic swimmer who competed at international elite competitions. He is a double World champion and European champion in freestyle swimming.
