= Natallia Shavel =

Belarusian Paralympic swimmer

Personal information
- Nationality: Belarusian
- Born: 3 December 1973 (age 52) Novosibirsk, Novosibirsk Oblast, Russian SFSR, Soviet Union (now Russia)
- Height: 1.53 m (5 ft 0 in)
- Weight: 55 kg (121 lb)

Sport
- Country: Belarus
- Sport: Paralympic swimming
- Disability: Spinal cord injury
- Disability class: S5, SB4
Medal record
Paralympic swimming
Representing Belarus
World Championships
Silver medal – second place	2010 Eindhoven	Women's 50m butterfly S5
Silver medal – second place	2010 Eindhoven	Women's 200m individual medley SM5
Silver medal – second place	2013 Montreal	Women's 50m butterfly S5
Bronze medal – third place	2013 Montreal	Women's 100m breaststroke SB4
Bronze medal – third place	2013 Montreal	Women's 50m backstroke S5
Silver medal – second place	2013 Montreal	Women's 200m individual medley SM5
Bronze medal – third place	2015 Glasgow	Women's 100m breaststroke SB4
Silver medal – second place	2017 Mexico City	Women's 100m breaststroke SB4
Bronze medal – third place	2017 Mexico City	Women's 200m individual medley SM6
European Championships
Bronze medal – third place	2014 Eindhoven	Women's 100m breaststroke SB4

Natallia Shavel (born 3 December 1973) is a Belarusian Paralympic swimmer who competes in international level events. She competed at the 2020 Summer Paralympics.

== Life ==
Shavel was 23 when she was involved in a car accident which resulted in a spinal cord injury. She competed at the 2010 IPC Swimming World Championships Eindhoven, winning a silver medal in Women's 50 m Butterfly S5, and Women's 200 m Individual Medley SM5
