= 2013 IPC Swimming World Championships =

International para swimming competition

5th IPC Swimming World Championships
- Host city: Montreal, Quebec, Canada
- Date: 12 – 18 August
- Venue: Parc Jean Drapeau Aquatic Complex
- Nations: 57
- Athletes: 530

The 2013 IPC Swimming World Championships was the seventh IPC Swimming World Championships, an international swimming competition, the biggest meet for athletes with a disability since the 2012 Summer Paralympics. It was held in Montreal, Quebec, Canada and lasted from 12 to 18 August. Around 530 athletes competed from 57 different countries. The event was held in the Parc Jean Drapeau Aquatic Complex located at the Parc Jean-Drapeau in Montreal. 172 events were contested with 43 new world records set.

== Venue ==

The Championship was staged at the Parc Jean Drapeau Aquatic Complex in the Parc Jean-Drapeau located in the east of Montreal. The complex contains three outdoor swimming pools, all renovated shortly before the staging of the competition.

== Coverage ==
As with the 2013 IPC Athletics World Championships, the IPC will continue to show live streaming of the evening finals on ParalympicSport.TV. In the United Kingdom Channel 4 continued their commitment to parasport with their own live streaming Paralympics website with pool-side commentary and a daily one-hour highlights television show the following morning on Channel 4. In Brazil coverage was provided by Globo-Sport TV while some European Broadcasting Union countries would also air the championships.

== Events ==
=== Classification ===
Athletes are allocated a classification for each event based upon their disability to allow fairer competition between athletes of similar ability. The classifications for swimming are:

- Visual impairment
  - S11-S13
- Intellectual impairment
  - S14
- Other disability
  - S1-S10 (Freestyle, backstroke and butterfly)
  - SB1-SB9 (breaststroke)
  - SM1-SM10 (individual medley)

Classifications run from S1 (severely disabled) to S10 (minimally disabled) for athletes with physical disabilities, and S11 (totally blind) to S13 (legally blind) for visually impaired athletes. Blind athletes must use blackened goggles.

=== Schedule ===
Finals

Date →		12 Aug	13 Aug	14 Aug	15 Aug	16 Aug	17 Aug	18 Aug
50 m freestyle	Men; Details	S4	S9; S11	S6; S7; S3	S12; S13			S5; S8; S10
50 m freestyle	Women; Details	S4	S9; S11	S6; S7; S3	S12; S13			S5; S8; S10
100 m freestyle	Men; Details	S12; S9; S10			S1; S4; S11	S2; S3; S7	S5; S8	S6; S13
100 m freestyle	Women; Details	S12; S9; S10			S4; S11	S2; S3; S7	S5; S8	S6; S13
200 m freestyle	Men; Details	S3; S14	S5			S4		
200 m freestyle	Women; Details	S3; S14	S5			S4		
400 m freestyle	Men; Details	S6; S7	S10	S8; S11		S9; S12; S13		
400 m freestyle	Women; Details	S6; S7	S10	S8; S11		S12; S13		
50m backstroke	Men; Details	S1	S4	S2; S5	S3			
50m backstroke	Women; Details		S4	S2; S5	S3			
100 m backstroke	Men; Details	S11		S14	S7		S10; S12; S13; S6	S9
100 m backstroke	Women; Details	S11		S14	S7		S10; S12; S13; S6	S9
50 m breaststroke	Men; Details		SB2					SB3
50 m breaststroke	Women; Details		SB2					
100m breaststroke	Men; Details		SB7; SB13; SB4; SB6	SB9	SB8	SB5; SB14	SB11	SB12
100m breaststroke	Women; Details		SB7; SB13; SB4; SB6	SB9	SB8	SB5; SB14	SB11	SB12
50 m butterfly	Men; Details	S5		S4			S6; S7	S3
50 m butterfly	Women; Details	S5					S6; S7	S3
100m butterfly	Men; Details		S12	S13		S8; S10; S11	S9	
100m butterfly	Women; Details		S12	S13		S8; S10; S11	S9	
150m medley	Men; Details						SM3; SM4	
150m medley	Women; Details						SM3; SM4	
200m medley	Men; Details	SM13	SM9; SM8	SM12	SM10; SM5; SM6			SM7; SM11; SM14
200m medley	Women; Details	SM13	SM9; SM8	SM12	SM10; SM5; SM6			SM7; SM11; SM14
4×50m freestyle relays	Men; Details			20 pts				
4×50m freestyle relays	Women; Details			20 pts				
4×50m medley relays	Men; Details					20 pts		
4×50m medley relays	Women; Details					20 pts		
4 × 100 m freestyle relays	Men; Details				34 pts			
4 × 100 m freestyle relays	Women; Details				34 pts			
4 × 100 m medley relays	Men; Details							34 pts
4 × 100 m medley relays	Women; Details							34 pts

== Medal table ==
The medal table at the end of the championship.

* Host nation (Canada)

Rank	Nation	Gold	Silver	Bronze	Total
1	Ukraine (UKR)	33	22	29	84
2	Russia (RUS)	19	22	13	54
3	Great Britain (GBR)	18	22	15	55
4	New Zealand (NZL)	12	1	2	15
5	United States (USA)	11	13	9	33
6	Brazil (BRA)	11	9	6	26
7	Australia (AUS)	11	4	12	27
8	Mexico (MEX)	6	5	7	18
9	Netherlands (NED)	6	5	3	14
10	Belarus (BLR)	6	2	2	10
11	China (CHN)	5	10	9	24
12	Germany (GER)	5	6	6	17
13	Canada (CAN)*	5	6	5	16
14	Spain (ESP)	4	14	9	27
15	Norway (NOR)	4	0	1	5
16	Japan (JPN)	3	3	3	9
17	Italy (ITA)	2	4	3	9
18	Colombia (COL)	2	1	3	6
19	Slovenia (SLO)	2	1	0	3
20	Ireland (IRL)	1	3	4	8
20	Sweden (SWE)	1	3	4	8
22	France (FRA)	1	2	4	7
22	South Africa (RSA)	1	2	4	7
24	Greece (GRE)	1	1	6	8
25	Israel (ISR)	1	1	0	2
26	Cyprus (CYP)	1	0	0	1
27	Czech Republic (CZE)	0	3	2	5
28	Kazakhstan (KAZ)	0	1	2	3
28	Poland (POL)	0	1	2	3
30	South Korea (KOR)	0	1	1	2
31	Argentina (ARG)	0	1	0	1
31	Austria (AUT)	0	1	0	1
31	Hungary (HUN)	0	1	0	1
31	Iceland (ISL)	0	1	0	1
31	Singapore (SIN)	0	1	0	1
36	Denmark (DEN)	0	0	3	3
37	Estonia (EST)	0	0	1	1
37	Finland (FIN)	0	0	1	1
37	Slovakia (SVK)	0	0	1	1
Totals (39 entries)		172	173	172	517

=== Multiple medallists ===
Many competitors won multiple medals at the 2013 Championships. The following athletes won five gold medals or more.

Name	Country	Medal	Event
Dmytro Vynohradets	Ukraine	Gold; Gold; Gold; Gold; Gold; Gold; Gold; Silver; Bronze	50m freestyle - S3; 100m freestyle - S3; 200m freestyle - S3; 150m medley - SM3; 50m backstroke - S3; 50m butterfly - S3; 4x50m medley relay 20pts 4x50m freestyle relay 20pts 50m breaststroke - SB2
Olga Sviderska	Ukraine	Gold; Gold; Gold; Gold; Gold; Gold; Gold	50m freestyle - S3; 100m freestyle - S3; 200m freestyle - S3; 150m medley - SM3; 50m backstroke - S3; 4x50m freestyle relay 20pts 4x50m medley relay 20pts
Daniel Dias	Brazil	Gold; Gold; Gold; Gold; Gold; Gold; Silver; Silver	50m freestyle - S5; 100m freestyle - S5; 200m freestyle - S5; 50m backstroke - S5; 200m medley - SM5; 4x50m freestyle relay 20pts 50m butterfly - S5; 4x50m freestyle relay 34pts
Mary Fisher	New Zealand	Gold; Gold; Gold; Gold; Gold; Silver	50m freestyle - S11; 100m freestyle - S11; 100m backstroke - S11; 200m medley - SM11; 100m butterfly - S11; 400m freestyle - S11
Darya Stukalova	Russia	Gold; Gold; Gold; Gold; Gold; Silver	50m freestyle - S12; 100m freestyle - S12; 400m freestyle - S12; 200m medley - SM12; 100m butterfly - S12; 100m backstroke - S12
Matthew Cowdrey	Australia	Gold; Gold; Gold; Gold; Gold; Bronze	50m freestyle - S9; 100m freestyle - S9; 100m backstroke - S9; 200m medley - SM9; 4x50m freestyle relay 34pts 100m butterfly - S9
Ihar Boki	Belarus	Gold; Gold; Gold; Gold; Gold	100m backstroke - S13; 100m butterfly - S13; 100m freestyle - S13; 200m medley - SM13; 400m freestyle - S13
Sophie Pascoe	New Zealand	Gold; Gold; Gold; Gold; Gold	50m freestyle - S10; 100m freestyle - S10; 100m backstroke - S10; 100m breaststroke - SB9; 100m butterfly - S10

== Highlights ==
=== Day 1 (12 August) ===
The first medal of the 2013 World Championships was won by Ireland's Darragh McDonald who took gold in the 400m freestyle S6 class. The first world record of the games came much earlier in the day when at 9:18AM on only the fourth heat of the championships, Konstantin Lisenkov of Russia recorded a time of 1:04.12 to beat his own record set three years earlier in Eindhoven in the 100m backstroke S8. This was one of three world records to fall in the morning heats, the others going to Nely Miranda Herrera (Mexico) in the 50m Women's freestyle S4 and Olga Sviderska (Ukraine) in the Women's 200m freestyle S3.

The afternoon session witnessed five new world records. Ihar Boki of Belarus, one of the stand-out athletes of the championships, broke the world record in the final of the SM13 200m individual medley. Then within the hour two more records fell as Lisenkov's record in the 100m backstroke S8, set in the morning, failed to last a day as he took 0.70 seconds of his own time to secure gold; while Britain's Josef Craig added the World title of the 400m freestyle S7 to his Paralympic title with a winning time of 4:39.13. The final two new world records were set in the last three races of the day. New Zealand's Sophie Pascoe swam 1:00.15 in the 100m freestyle S10 while British athlete Jessica-Jane Applegate recorded a time of 2:09.88 in the 200m freestyle to just freeze out Ireland's Bethany Firth.

Of the other medals, several of the big stars of the games took their first gold medals on the first day. Ukraine's Dmytro Vynohradets took the first of his seven gold medals with success in the Men's 200m freestyle S3, while his teammate Olga Sviderska took the equivalent title in the women's race but well outside her morning's record finish. Australia's Matthew Cowdrey picked up the first of five championship golds in the 100m freestyle S9 while the women's race Stephanie Millward of Britain secured the first of her four golds. New Zealand saw further success on Day one when Mary Fisher started her rung of gold medals with a win in the 100m backstroke S11. Brazil's Andre Brasil became a double Paralympic and World Champion taking the 100m Freestyle S10, a title he has held in those two world championships since 2008 in Beijing. The USA also achieved success on day one, collecting three medals from Roy Perkins (50m butterfly S5), Rebecca Anne Meyers (200m medley SM13) and Cortney Jordan (400m freestyle S7), though it was Ukraine who topped the medal table at the day with six golds.

== Participating nations ==
Below is the list of countries who agreed to participate in the Championships and the requested number of athlete places for each.

- Argentina (11)
- Armenia (1)
- Australia (20)
- Austria (1)
- Belarus (3)
- Belgium (3)
- Brazil (29)
- Canada (28)
- Chile ( 1)
- China (21)
- Chinese Taipei (1)
- Colombia (10)
- Croatia (3)
- Cyprus (1)
- Czech Republic (8)
- Denmark (4)
- Estonia (2)
- Finland (2)
- France (7)
- Georgia (1)
- Germany (12)
- Great Britain (35)
- Greece (12)
- Hong Kong (3)
- Hungary (18)
- Iceland (4)
- India (1)
- Iraq (1)
- Ireland (7)
- Israel (7)
- Italy (19)
- Japan (13)
- Kazakhstan (2)
- Latvia (1)
- Lithuania (2)
- Malaysia (1)
- Mexico (14)
- Namibia (2)
- Netherlands (12)
- New Zealand (7)
- Norway (4)
- Poland (7)
- Portugal (6)
- Romania (2)
- Russia (46)
- Singapore (2)
- Slovakia (3)
- Slovenia (3)
- South Africa (11)
- South Korea (5)
- Spain (20)
- Sweden (6)
- Turkey (1)
- Ukraine (52)
- Uruguay (1)
- United States (30)
- Venezuela (1)

== Footnotes ==
Notes
