= 2016 IPC Swimming European Championships =

International swimming competition

4th IPC Swimming European Championships
- Host city: Funchal, Madeira
- Date: 30 April – 7 May
- Venue: Complexo Olímpico de Piscinas da Penteada
- Nations: 51
- Events: 13

The 2016 IPC Swimming European Championships was an international swimming competition. It was held in Funchal, Madeira running from 30 April to 7 May. Around 450 athletes from 50 different countries attended the competition. This was the last major swimming tournament for disabled athletes prior to the 2016 Summer Paralympics in Rio, and acted as a qualifying event for the Rio Games. To increase the possibility of qualification for top swimmers, the championships was made an Open tournament allowing competitors from countries outside Europe to compete.

== Venue ==
The Championship was staged at the Complexo Olimpico de Piscinas da Penteada, which also held the 2005 Multi-nations Youth Meet and the 2015 Winter International Masters Open. The complex contains an Olympic sized swimming pool, a 25-metre pool, a diving pool and a training pool.

== Events ==
=== Classification ===
Athletes are allocated a classification for each event based upon their disability to allow fairer competition between athletes of similar ability. The classifications for swimming are:

- Visual impairment
  - S11-S13
- Intellectual impairment
  - S14
- Other disability
  - S1-S10 (Freestyle, backstroke and butterfly)
  - SB1-SB9 (breaststroke)
  - SM1-SM10 (individual medley)

Classifications run from S1 (severely disabled) to S10 (minimally disabled) for athletes with physical disabilities, and S11 (totally blind) to S13 (legally blind) for visually impaired athletes. Blind athletes must use blackened goggles.

== Results ==
=== Men ===
==== Freestyle ====
50m Freestyle

Classification	Gold		Silver		Bronze	
S2	Ievgen Panibratets; Ukraine	59.71	Serhii Palamarchuk; Ukraine	1:00.17	Dmitrii Kokarev; Russia	1:00.26
S3	Dmytro Vynohradets; Ukraine	45.43	Vincenzo Boni; Italy	45.92	Alexander Makarov; Russia	47.79
S4	Roman Zhdanov; Russia	39.57	David Smetanine; France	40.13	Andrii Derevinskyi; Ukraine	41.23
S6	Oleksandr Komarov; Ukraine	31.19	Panagiotis Christakis; Greece	31.84	Sebastian Iwanow; Germany	32.25
S7	Yevheniy Bohodayko; Ukraine	28.23	Sergey Sukharev; Russia	28.52	Tobias Pollap; Germany	28.98
S8	Denis Tarasov; Russia	26.21	Bohdan Hrynenko; Ukraine	26.92	Iurii Bozhynskyi; Ukraine	27.20
S9	Matthew Wylie; Great Britain	25.85	Leo Lahteenmaki; Finland	26.17	José Antonio Mari-Alcaraz; Spain	26.22
S10	Dmitry Grigoryev; Russia	24.58	David Julián Levecq Vives; Spain	24.75	Simone Ciulli; Italy	25.40
S11	Zryhory Zudzilau; Belarus	27.61	Oleksandr Mashchenko; Ukraine	27.64	Viktor Smyrnov; Ukraine	27.92
S12	Maksym Veraksa; Ukraine	23.80	Dzmitry Salei; Azerbaijan	24.14	Raman Salei; Azerbaijan	24.45
S13	Ihar Boki; Belarus	23.61	Oleksii Fedyna; Ukraine; Iaroslav Denysenko; Ukraine	24.34	—N/a	

100m Freestyle

Classification	Gold		Silver		Bronze	
S4	Roman Zhdanov; Russia	1:24.24	Darko Duric; Slovenia	1:28.21	Andrii Derevinskyi; Ukraine	1:28.54
S5	Andrew Mullen; Great Britain	1:16.11	Dmitrii Cherniaev; Russia	1:16.91	Sebastián Rodríguez Veloso; Spain	1:17.26
S6	Oleksandr Komarov; Ukraine	1:06.92	Thijs van Hofweegen; Netherlands	1:09.92	Francesco Bocciardo; Ukraine	1:09.93
S7	Sergey Sukharev; Russia	1:03.93	Jonathan Fox; Great Britain	1:04.18	Andrei Gladkov; Russia	1:04.28
S8	Denis Tarasov; Russia	58.09	Oliver Hynd; Great Britain	59.88	Bohdan Hrynenko; Ukraine	1:00.19
S9	Federico Morlacchi; Italy	56.99	Lewis White; Great Britain	58.07	Kristijan Vincetic; Croatia	58.38
S10	Dmitry Grigoryev; Russia	54.30	Dmitri Bartasinskii; Russia	54.42	Denys Dubrov; Ukraine	54.46
S11	Oleksandr Mashchenko; Ukraine	1:01.41	Hryhory Zudzilau; Belarus	1:02.21	Wojciech Artur Makowski; Poland	1:03.13
S13	Ihar Boki (S13); Belarus	50.87	Iaroslav Denysenko (S13); Ukraine	52.60	Maksym Veraksa (S12); Ukraine	53.02

200m Freestyle

Classification	Gold		Silver		Bronze	
S1	Hennadii Boiko; Ukraine	5:04.11	Francesco Bettella; Italy	5:05.70	Anton Kol; Ukraine	5:07.90
S2	Dmitrii Kokarev; Russia	4:12.76 WR	Serhii Palamarchuk; Ukraine	4:21.76	Ievgen Panibratets; Ukraine	4:31.53
S3	Dmytro Vynohradets; Ukraine	3:21.30 ER	Alexander Makarov; Russia	3:28.22	Vincenzo Boni; Italy	3:33.03
S4	Roman Zhdanov; Russia	3:02.28	David Smetanine; France	3:07.75	Darko Duric; Slovenia	3:08.38
S5	Andrew Mullen; Great Britain	2:42.56	Théo Curin; France	2:43.61	Sebastián Rodríguez Veloso; Spain	2:51.36
S14	Thomas Hamer; Great Britain	1:57.96	Jon Margeir Sverrisson; Iceland	1:58.06	Mikhail Kuliabin; Russia	1:58.75

400m Freestyle

Classification	Gold		Silver		Bronze	
S6	Francesco Bocciardo; Italy	5:03.02	Viacheslav Lenskii; Russia	5:19.57	Thijs van Hofweegen; Netherlands	5:24.45
S7	Andrei Gladkov; Russia	4:52.52	Andreas Skaar Bjornstad; Norway	4:58.40	Marian Kvasnytsia; Ukraine	5:01.33
S8	Oliver Hynd; Great Britain	4:24.77	Josef Craig; Great Britain	4:35.87	Bohdan Hrynenko; Ukraine	4:43.76
S9	Federico Morlacchi; Italy	4:19.28	Kristijan Vincetic; Croatia	4:22.95	David Grachat; Portugal	4:28.26
S10	Denys Dubrov; Ukraine	4:08.54	Dmitri Bartasinskii; Russia	4:08.77	Patryk Karlinski; Poland	4:17.09
S11	Israel Oliver; Spain	4:47.62	Viktor Smyrnov; Ukraine	4:56.93	Dmytro Zalevskyy; Ukraine	5:03.21
S13	Ihar Boki (S13); Belarus	3:56.97	Iaroslav Denysenko (S13); Ukraine	3:59.99	Sergey Punko (S12); Russia	4:13.13

==== Backstroke ====
50m Backstroke

Classification	Gold		Silver		Bronze	
S1	Hennadii Boiko; Ukraine	1:06.92	Francesco Bettella; Italy	1:11.27	Anton Kol; Ukraine	1:13.19
S2	Serhii Palamarchuk; Ukraine	58.52	Jacek Czech; Poland	58.92	Dmitrii Kokarev; Russia	1:00.32
S3	Vincenzo Boni; Italy	45.94	Alexander Makarov; Russia	48.03	Miguel Angel Martinez Tajuelo; Spain	52.53
S4	Roman Zhdanov; Russia	43.52 ER	Arnost Petracek; Czech Republic	45.66	Jan Povysil; Czech Republic	47.40
S5	Andrew Mullen; Great Britain	37.92	Zsolt Vereczkei; Hungary	40.21	Jonas Larsen; Denmark	41.67

100m Backstroke

Classification	Gold		Silver		Bronze	
S1	Hennadii Boiko; Ukraine	2:23.75 WR	Francesco Bettella; Italy	2:26.63	Anton Kol; Ukraine	2:31.05
S2	Dmitrii Kokarev; Russia	2:02.25 WR	Serhii Palamarchuk; Ukraine	2:06.47	Aristeidis Makrodimitris; Greece	2:11.23
S6	Oleksandr Komarov; Ukraine	1:18.82	Sebastian Iwanow; Germany	1:19.27	Thijs van Hofweegen; Netherlands	1:20.78
S7	Jonathan Fox; Great Britain	1:10.62	Andrei Gladkov; Russia	1:11.45	Yevheniy Bohodayko; Ukraine	1:12.96
S8	Oliver Hynd; Great Britain	1:06.56	Iurii Bozhynskyi; Ukraine	1:09.35	Niels Korfitz Mortensen; Denmark	1:10.02
S9	James Crisp; Great Britain	1:04.18	Patryk Biskup; Poland	1:04.98	Tamás Tóth; Hungary	1:05.85
S10	Kardo Ploomipuu; Estonia	1:01.69	Riccardo Menciotti; Italy	1:02.62	Denys Dubrov; Ukraine	1:03.03
S11	Wojciech Artur Makowski; Poland	1:09.11	Dmytro Zalevskyy; Ukraine	1:09.96	Viktor Smyrnov; Ukraine	1:10.28
S12	Sergii Klippert; Ukraine	1:01.20	Roman Makarov; Russia	1:01.24	Raman Salei; Azerbaijan	1:01.77
S13	Ihar Boki; Belarus	56.81	Iaroslav Denysenko; Ukraine	59.61	Antti Antero Latikka; Finland	1:03.59
S14	Marc Evers; Netherlands	1:00.70	Mikhail Kuliabin; Russia	1:02.19	Andrei Shabalin; Russia	1:03.17

==== Breaststroke ====
50m Breaststroke

Classification	Gold		Silver		Bronze	
SB2	Dmytro Vynohradets; Ukraine	1:00.89	Serhii Lapchenko; Ukraine	1:04.97	Alexander Makarov; Russia	1:14.79
SB3	Efrem Morelli; Italy	49.16 ER	Miguel Luque; Spain	50.21	Aleksei Lyzhikhin; Russia	52.65

100m Breaststroke

Classification	Gold		Silver		Bronze	
SB4	Ricardo Ten; Spain	1:39.81	Antonios Tsapatakis; Greece	1:40.38	Dmitrii Cherniaev; Russia	1:41.58
SB5	Iurii Luchkin; Russia	1:30.18	Karl Forsman; Sweden	1:34.17	Marco Maria Dolfin; Italy	1:38.61
SB6	Yevheniy Bohodayko; Ukraine	1:22.85	Torben Schmidtke; Azerbaijan	1:23.77	Andreas Skaar Bjornstad; Norway	1:26.45
SB7	Egor Efrosinin; Russia	1:21.34	Bohdan Hrynenko; Ukraine	1:21.66	Victor Chebotarev; Russia	1:27.50
SB8	Federico Morlacchi; Italy	1:12.96	Andreas Onea; Austria	1:13.75	Charles Rozoy; France	1:14.52
SB9	Pavel Poltavtsev; Russia	1:05.81	Denys Dubrov; Ukraine	1:07.71	Aleksei Bugaenko; Russia	1:09.91
SB11	Oleksandr Mashchenko; Ukraine	1:15.22	Israel Oliver; Spain	1:15.51	Viktor Smyrnov; Ukraine	1:18.49
SB12	Uladzimir Izotau; Belarus	1:08.00	Dzmitry Salei; Azerbaijan	1:08.31	Artur Saifutdinov; Russia	1:08.38
SB13	Oleksii Fedyna; Ukraine	1:04.55	Maksim Nikiforov; Russia	1:07.02	Ihar Boki; Belarus	1:07.25
SB14	Scott Quin; Great Britain	1:07.29	Artem Pavlenko; Russia	1:07.63	Adam Ismael Wenham; Norway	1:08.60

==== Butterfly ====
50m Butterfly

Classification	Gold		Silver		Bronze	
S5	Andrew Mullen; Great Britain	36.91	Dmitrii Cherniaev; Russia	38.38	Beytullah Eroglu; Turkey	38.41
S6	Sergey Klyagin; Russia	33.66	Alejandro Yared Rojas Cabrera; Spain	36.31	Yoav Valinsky; Israel	39.14
S7	Yevheniy Bohodayko; Ukraine	29.91	Egor Efrosinin; Russia	31.09	Andriy Kozlenko; Ukraine	32.68

100m Butterfly

Classification	Gold		Silver		Bronze	
S8	Denis Tarasov; Russia	1:01.76	Charles Rozoy; France	1:01.95	Niels Korfitz Moretensen; Denmark	1:05.74
S9	Federico Morlacchi; Italy	1:00.09	Dimosthenis Michalentzakis; Greece	1:00.16	Tamás Sors; Hungary	1:00.78
S10	Denys Dubrov; Ukraine	56.84	Dmitry Grigoryev; Russia	57.73	David Julián Levecq Vives; Spain	58.81
S13	Ihar Boki (S13); Belarus	54.65	Roman Makarov (S12); Russia	57.03	Raman Salei (S12); Azerbaijan	57.98

==== Individual medley ====
150m Individual Medley

Classification	Gold		Silver		Bronze	
SM3	Dmytro Vynohradets; Ukraine	2:59.61	Alexander Makarov; Russia	3:21.00	Mikael Fredriksson; Sweden	3:24.58
SM4	Roman Zhdanov; Russia	2:29.89 ER	Jonas Larsen; Denmark	2:32.19	Jan Povysil; Czech Republic	2:40.04

200m Individual Medley

Classification	Gold		Silver		Bronze	
SM6	Iurii Luchkin; Russia	2:57.41	Iaroslav Semenenko; Ukraine	2:58.26	Yoav Valinsky; Israel	3:00.04
SM7	Yevheniy Bohodayko; Ukraine	2:36.56	Tobias Pollap; Germany	2:44.71	Andrei Gladkov; Russia	2:48.19
SM8	Oliver Hynd; Great Britain	2:25.60	Niels Korfitz Mortensen; Denmark	2:29.76	Andreas Onea; Austria	2:31.10
SM9	Federico Morlacchi; Italy	2:18.39	Tamás Tóth; Hungary	2:21.43	Tamás Sors; Hungary	2:22.42
SM10	Denys Dubrov; Ukraine	2:08.71 WR	Dmytro Vanzenko; Ukraine	2:15.80	Dmitry Grigoryev; Russia	2:17.66
SM11	Israel Oliver; Spain	2:24.66	Oleksandr Mashchenko; Ukraine	2:30.75	Viktor Smyrnov; Ukraine	2:33.68
SM14	Marc Evers; Netherlands	2:11.67	Mikhail Kuliabin; Russia	2:14.21	Thomas Hamer; Great Britain	2:15.94

==== Relay ====
4 × 100 m Freestyle Relay

Classification	Gold		Silver		Bronze	
34 points	Sergey Sukharev (S7); Denis Tarasov (S8); Alexander Skaliukh (S9); Dmitry Grigoryev (S10); Russia	3:52.44	Oliver Hynd (S8); Matthew Wylie (S9); Josef Craig (S8); Lewis White (S9); Great Britain	3:53.47	Oleksandr Komarov (S6); Dmytro Vanzenko (S10); Bohdan Hrynenko (S8); Denys Dubrov (S10); Ukraine	3:57.41

4 × 100 m Medley Relay

Classification	Gold		Silver		Bronze	
34 points	Andrei Gladkov (S7); Pavel Poltavtsev (SB9); Dmitry Grigoryev (S10); Denis Tarasov (S8); Russia	4:10.60	Iurii Bozhynskyi (S8); Dmytro Vanzenko (SB9); Denys Dubrov (S10); Yevheniy Bohodayko (S7); Ukraine	4:19.15	Riccardo Menciotti (S10); Federico Morlacchi (SB8); Simone Ciulli (S10); Francesco Bocciardo (S6); Italy	4:42.57

=== Women ===
==== Freestyle ====
50m Freestyle

Classification	Gold		Silver		Bronze	
S2	Ingrid Thunem (S1); Norway	54.31	Alexandra Agafonova (S2); Russia	1:06.83	Iryna Sotska (S2); Ukraine	1:11.42
S3	Olga Sviderska; Ukraine	46:64	Alexandra Stamatopoulou; Greece	47.89	Iuliia Shishova; Russia	48.70
S4	Arjola Trimi; Italy	41.12	Mariia Lafina; Ukraine	47.74	Maryna Verbova; Ukraine	52.48
S6	Viktoriia Savtsova; Ukraine	32.98 WR	Yelyzaveta Mereshko; Ukraine	33.43	Eleanor Robinson; Great Britain	35.43
S7	Susie Rodgers; Great Britain	33.80	Denise Grahl; Germany	34.25	Erel Halevi; Israel	37.77
S8	Stephanie Slater; Great Britain	30.57	Kateryna Istomina; Ukraine	31.76	Olesia Vladykina; Russia	31.84
S9	Sarai Gascon; Spain	28.89 ER	Natalia Mamlina; Russia	29.79	Nuria Marques Soto; Spain	30.03
S10	Nina Ryabova; Russia	27.60 WR	Elodie Lorandi; France	28.53	Chantalle Zijderveld; Netherlands	28.83
S11	Maja Reichard; Sweden	30.87 WR	Liesette Bruinsma; Netherlands	31.22	Cecilia Camellini; Italy	32.00
S12	Darya Stukalova; Russia	27.00	Hannah Russell; Great Britain	27.46	Naomi Maike Schnittger; Germany	28.44
S13	Anna Stetsenko; Ukraine	27.45	Anna Krivshina; Russia	27.85	Joanna Mendak; Poland	28.62

100m Freestyle

Classification	Gold		Silver		Bronze	
S3	Olga Sviderska; Ukraine	1:39.97	Iuliia Shishova; Russia	1:49.04	Alexandra Stamatopoulou; Greece	1:51.53
S4	Arjola Trimi; Italy	1:28.02 WR	Mariia Lafina; Ukraine	1:38.57	Maryna Verbova; Ukraine	1:54.01
S5	Teresa Perales; Spain; Sarah Louise Rung; Norway	1:21.97	—N/a		Inbal Pezaro; Israel	1:24.73
S6	Yelyzaveta Mereshko; Ukraine	1:12.38	Viktoriia Savtsova; Ukraine	1:15.56	Eleanor Robinson; Great Britain	1:16.96
S7	Susannah Rodgers; Great Britain	1:13.42	Denise Grahl; Germany	1:15.01	Verena Schott; Germany	1:19.30
S8	Olesia Vladykina; Russia	1:09.97	Amalie Vinther; Denmark	1:10.86	Mariia Pavlova; Russia	1:11.86
S9	Sarai Gascon; Spain	1:02.81 ER	Nuria Marques Soto; Spain	1:04.14	Stephanie Millward; Great Britain	1:05.26
S10	Nina Ryabova; Russia	1:00.93	Elodie Lorandi; France	1:01.29	Chantalle Zijderveld; Netherlands	1:02.77
S11	Cecilia Camellini; Italy	1:09.20	Maja Reichard; Sweden	1:09.74	Liesette Bruinsma; Netherlands	1:09.85
S13	Anna Stetsenko (S13); Ukraine	58.05 WR	Darya Stukalova (S12); Russia	58.93	Hannah Russell (S12); Great Britain	59.32

200m Freestyle

Classification	Gold		Silver		Bronze	
S4	Arjola Trimi (S4); Italy	3:10.61 WR	Mariia Lafina (S4); Ukraine	3:23.06	Olga Sviderska (S3); Ukraine	3:31.98
S5	Sarah Louise Rung; Norway	2:51.84	Teresa Perales; Spain	2:58.01	Inbal Pezaro; Israel	2:59.85
S14	Valeriia Shabalina; Russia	2:03.54 WR	Jessica-Jane Applegate; Great Britain	2:06.29	Michelle Alonso Morales; Spain	2:16.87

400m Freestyle

Classification	Gold		Silver		Bronze	
S6	Yelyzaveta Mereshko; Ukraine	5:14.69 WR	Viktoriia Savtsova; Ukraine	5:37.52	Eleanor Robinson; Great Britain	5:43.77
S7	Susie Rodgers; Great Britain	5:27.16	Verena Schott; Germany	5:40.59	Arianna Talamona; Italy	5:41.46
S8	Amalie Vinther; Denmark	5:17.01	Vendula Duskova; Czech Republic	5:26.57	Mariia Pavlova; Russia	5:32.69
S9	Stephanie Millward; Great Britain	4:45.71	Nuria Marques Soto; Spain	4:53.77	Zsofia Konkoly; Hungary	4:54.84
S10	Elodie Lorandi; France	4:35.54	Oliwia Jablonska; Poland	4:35.91	Bianka Pap; Hungary	4:45.77
S11	Liesette Bruinsma; Netherlands	5:20.14	Cecilia Camellini; Italy	5:30.26	Daniela Schulte; Germany	5:38.24

==== Backstroke ====
50m Backstroke

Classification	Gold		Silver		Bronze	
S2	Ingrid Thunem (S1); Norway	1:06.53 WR	Alexandra Agafonova (S2); Russia	1:06.75	Iryna Sotska (S2); Ukraine	1:10.02
S3	Olga Sviderska; Ukraine	56.03	Iuliia Shishova; Russia	59.51	Alexandra Stamatopoulou; Greece	1:01.15
S4	Maryna Verbova; Ukraine	53.76	Arjola Trimi; Italy	54.80	Mariia Lafina; Ukraine	55.59
S5	Teresa Perales; Spain	43.50	Bela Trebinova; Czech Republic	45.14	Sarah Louise Rung; Norway	45.32

100m Backstroke

Classification	Gold		Silver		Bronze	
S2	Iryna Sotska (S2); Ukraine	2:16.63	Ingrid Thunem (S1); Norway	2:25.71 WR	Alexandra Agafonova (S2); Russia	2:34.63
S6	Anastasia Diodorova; Russia	1:26.27	Oksana Khrul; Ukraine	1:27.71	Yelyzaveta Mereshko; Ukraine	1:29.34
S7	Verena Schott; Germany	1:28.14	Denise Grahl; Germany	1:28.95	Arianna Talamona; Italy	1:32.79
S8	Mariia Pavlova; Russia	1:20.42	Olesia Vladykina; Russia	1:22.00	Kseniia Sogomonian; Russia	1:24.29
S9	Nuria Marques Soto; Spain	1:09.51 ER	Stephanie Millward; Great Britain	1:12.68	Zsofia Konkoly; Hungary	1:15.88
S10	Bianka Pap; Hungary	1:09.11	Nina Ryabova; Russia	1:09.29	Anaelle Roulet; France	1:10.78
S11	Maryna Piddubna; Ukraine	1:20.11	Daniela Schulte; Germany	1:22.45	Cecilia Camellini; Italy	1:22.65
S12	Hannah Russell; Great Britain	1:06.18	Darya Stukalova; Russia	1:10.44	Yaryna Matlo; Ukraine	1:13.55
S13	Anna Krivshina; Russia	1:07.05 WR	Anna Stetsenko; Ukraine	1:09.90	Karina Petrikovicova; Slovakia	1:14.85
S14	Valeriia Shabalina; Russia	1:05.31	Jessica-Jane Applegate; Great Britain	1:07.03	Janina Breuer; Germany	1:13.53

==== Breaststroke ====
50m Breaststroke

Classification	Gold		Silver		Bronze	
SB3	Olga Sviderska; Ukraine	1:02.62	Mariia Lafina; Ukraine	1:03.53	Arjola Trimi; Italy	1:04.40

100m Breaststroke

Classification	Gold		Silver		Bronze	
SB4	Sarah Louise Rung; Norway	1:44.49	Giulia Ghiretti; Italy	1:53.63	Irina Deviatova; Russia	2:01.96
SB5	Viktoriia Savtsova; Ukraine	1:38.41	Yelyzaveta Mereshko; Ukraine	1:40.16	Fanni Illes; Hungary	1:48.66
SB6	Charlotte Henshaw; Great Britain	1:37.55	Nicole Turner; Ireland	1:46.29	Nina Kozlova; Ukraine	1:51.47
SB7	Oksana Khrul; Ukraine	1:37.62	Mariia Pavlova; Russia	1:44.47	Vendula Duskova; Czech Republic	1:46.88
SB8	Olesia Vladykina; Russia	1:18.98	Paulina Wozniak; Poland	1:21.47	Claire Cashmore; Great Britain	1:21.53
SB9	Chantalle Zijderveld; Netherlands	1:17.96	Harriet Lee; Great Britain	1:18.71	Nina Ryabova; Russia	1:20.73
SB11	Liesette Bruinsma; Netherlands; Maja Reichard; Sweden	1:25.47	—N/a		Yana Berezhna; Ukraine	1:30.55
SB13	Elena Krawzow; Germany	1:17.44	Rebecca Redfern; Great Britain	1:17.46	Karolina Pelendritou; Cyprus	1:18.60
SB14	Michelle Alonso Morales; Spain	1:13.46	Bethany Firth; Great Britain	1:14.31	Valeriia Shabalina; Russia	1:18.48

==== Butterfly ====
50m Butterfly

Classification	Gold		Silver		Bronze	
S5	Sarah Louise Rung; Norway	43.71	Teresa Perales; Spain	46.14	Réka Kézdi; Hungary	46.41
S6	Oksana Khrul; Ukraine	35.48 WR	Eleanor Robinson; Great Britain	35.66	Nicole Turner; Ireland	38.17
S7	Susie Rodgers; Great Britain	35.90 ER	Judit Rolo Marichal; Spain	38.72	Denise Grahl; Germany	40.78

100m Butterfly

Classification	Gold		Silver		Bronze	
S8	Stephanie Slater; Great Britain	1:09.67	Kateryna Istomina; Ukraine	1:10.24	Olesia Vladykina; Russia	1:17.62
S9	Sarai Gascon; Spain	1:07.61 ER	Nuria Marques Soto; Spain	1:10.41	Claire Cashmore; Great Britain	1:10.62
S10	Nina Ryabova; Russia	1:07.48	Oliwia Jablonska; Poland	1:09.08	Isabel Yinghua Hernandez Santos; Spain	1:10.62
S13	Darya Stukalova (S12); Russia	1:04.92	Joanna Mendak (S13); Poland	1:06.44	Alessia Berra (S13); Italy	1:07.81

==== Individual medley ====
150m Individual Medley

Classification	Gold		Silver		Bronze	
SM4	Mariia Lafina (SM4); Ukraine	2:57.69	Olga Sviderska (SM3); Ukraine	3:01.38 WR	Natalia Gavrilyuk (SM4); Russia	3:20.91

200m Individual Medley

Classification	Gold		Silver		Bronze	
SM5	Sarah Louise Rung; Norway	3:18.11	Inbal Pezaro; Israel	3:39.27	Teresa Perales; Spain	3:41.33
SM6	Yelyzaveta Mereshko; Ukraine	3:03.73	Nicole Turner; Ireland	3:14.41	Verena Schott; Germany	3:15.41
SM7	Arianna Talamona; Italy	3:19.76	Meri-Maari Mäkinen; Finland	3:33.00	Mina Marie Heyerdal Klausen; Norway	3:34.78
SM8	Olesia Vladykina; Russia	2:44.27	Mariia Pavlova; Russia	2:58.25	Amalie Vinther; Denmark	3:07.12
SM9	Sarai Gascon; Spain	2:36.31	Paulina Wozniak; Poland	2:38.12	Nuria Marques Soto; Spain	2:38.26
SM10	Nina Ryabova; Russia	2:30.94	Bianka Pap; Hungary	2:32.76	Chantalle Zijderveld; Netherlands	2:33.67
SM11	Liesette Bruinsma; Netherlands	2:54.17	Maja Reichard; Sweden	2:55.42	Daniela Schulte; Germany	2:56.50
SM14	Valeriia Shabalina; Russia	2:18.37 WR	Bethany Firth; Great Britain	2:21.24	Jessica-Jane Applegate; Great Britain	2:26.49

==== Relay ====
4 × 100 m Freestyle Relay

Classification	Gold		Silver		Bronze	
34 points	Isabel Yingüa Hernández (S10); Teresa Perales (S5); Sarai Gascon (S9); Nuria Marques Soto (S9); Spain	4:34.68	Valeriia Kukanova (S9); Olesia Vladykina (S8); Mariia Pavlova (S8); Natalia Mamlina (S9); Russia	4:40.64	Bianka Pap (S10); Zsofia Konkoly (S9); Luca Sós (S10); Réka Kezdi (S5); Hungary	5:00.47

4 × 100 m Medley Relay

Classification	Gold		Silver		Bronze	
34 points	Stephanie Millward (S9); Harriet Lee (SB9); Claire Cashmore (S9); Susie Rodgers (S7); Great Britain	4:53.15	Mariia Pavlova (S8); Olesia Vladykina (SB8); Irina Grazhdanova (S9); Natalia Mamlina (S9); Russia	4:58.79	Bianka Pap (S10); Fanni Illés (SB5); Zsofia Konkoly (S9); Luca Sós (S10); Hungary	5:15.11

=== Mixed ===
==== Relay ====
4x50 m Freestyle Relay

Classification	Gold		Silver		Bronze	
20 points	Yelyzaveta Mereshko (S6); Oleksii Kabyshev (S5); Dmytro Vynohradets (S3); Viktoriia Savtsova (S6); Ukraine	2:30.26	Vincenzo Boni (S3); Arjola Trimi (S4); Valerio Taras (S7); Emanuela Romano (S6); Italy	2:33.61	Iuliia Shishova (S3); Anastasia Diodorova (S6); Dmitrii Cherniaev (S5); Sergey Klyagin (S6); Russia	2:36.99

4x50 m Medley Relay

Classification	Gold	Silver	Bronze
20 points	Iaroslav Semenenko (S6); Viktoriia Savtsova (SB5); Oksana Khrul (S6); Dmytro Vynohradets (S3); Ukraine	Vincenzo Boni (S3); Giulia Ghiretti (SB4); Federico Morlacchi (S9); Arjola Trimi (S4); Italy	Teresa Perales (S5); Miguel Luque (SB3); Judit Rolo Marichal (S7); Sebastián Rodríguez Veloso (S5); Spain

== Medal table ==
Host nation (Portugal)

Rank	Nation	Gold	Silver	Bronze	Total
1	Ukraine	45	34	31	110
2	Russia	36	33	28	97
3	Great Britain	22	15	9	46
4	Spain	14	10	13	37
5	Italy	13	10	11	34
6	Belarus	8	1	1	10
7	Norway	7	2	4	13
8	Netherlands	6	2	6	14
9	Germany	2	9	9	20
10	Sweden	2	3	1	6
11	Poland	1	7	3	11
12	France	1	6	3	10
13	Hungary	1	3	10	14
14	Denmark	1	3	4	8
15	Estonia	1	0	0	1
16	Czech Republic	0	4	3	7
16	Greece	0	4	3	7
18	Azerbaijan	0	2	4	6
19	Finland	0	2	1	3
19	Ireland	0	2	1	3
21	Israel	0	1	5	6
22	Austria	0	1	1	2
22	Croatia	0	1	1	2
22	Slovenia	0	1	1	2
25	Iceland	0	1	0	1
26	Portugal*	0	0	2	2
27	Cyprus	0	0	1	1
27	Slovakia	0	0	1	1
27	Turkey	0	0	1	1
Totals (29 entries)		160	157	158	475

=== Multiple medallists ===
Many competitors won multiple medals at the 2016 Championships. The following athletes won five gold medals or more.

Name	Country	Medal	Event
Dmytro Vynohradets	Ukraine	Gold; Gold; Gold; Gold; Gold; Gold	50m freestyle S3; 200m freestyle S3; 50 m breaststroke SB2; 150 m ind. medley SM3; 50m freestyle relay 20pts 50m medley relay 20pts
Ihar Boki	Belarus	Gold; Gold; Gold; Gold; Gold; Bronze	50m freestyle S13; 100m freestyle S13; 400m freestyle S13; 100 m backstroke S13; 100 m butterfly S13; 100 m breaststroke – SB13
Sarah Louise Rung	Norway	Gold; Gold; Gold; Gold; Gold; Bronze	100 m freestyle S5; 200 m freestyle S5; 100 m breaststroke SB4; 50 m butterfly S5; 200m medley SM5; 50 m backstroke S5
Sarai Gascón Moreno	Spain	Gold; Gold; Gold; Gold; Gold	50 m freestyle S9; 100 m freestyle S9; 100 m butterfly S9; 200m medley SM9; 100m freestyle relay 34pts
Susie Rodgers	Great Britain	Gold; Gold; Gold; Gold; Gold	50 m freestyle S7; 100 m freestyle S7; 400 m freestyle S7; 50 m butterfly S7; 100m medley relay 34pts
Denis Tarasov	Russia	Gold; Gold; Gold; Gold; Gold	50m freestyle S8; 100m freestyle S8; 100 m butterfly S8; 4x100m freestyle relay 34pts 4x100m medley relay 34pts

== Participating nations ==
Below is the list of countries who participated in the Championships and the requested number of athlete places for each. As this was an Open Championship the countries are split between Europe and the Rest of the World.

=== Europe ===
- Austria (3)
- Azerbaijan (2)
- Belarus (6)
- Belgium (7)
- Croatia (6)
- Cyprus (1)
- Czech Republic (12)
- Denmark (6)
- Estonia (8)
- Finland (4)
- France (7)
- Faroe Islands (1)
- Georgia (2)
- Germany (20)
- Great Britain (26)
- Greece (13)
- Hungary (21)
- Iceland (4)
- Ireland (6)
- Israel (9)
- Italy (19)
- Latvia (1)
- Lithuania (2)
- Malta (1)
- Montenegro (1)
- Netherlands (4)
- Norway (6)
- Poland (17)
- Portugal (20)
- Romania (4)
- Russia (62)
- Slovenia (1)
- Slovakia (3)
- Spain (36)
- Sweden (9)
- Switzerland (3)
- Turkey (13)
- Ukraine (47)

=== Rest of the World ===
- Argentina (11)
- Brazil (13)
- Canada (1)
- Colombia (3)
- Indonesia (5)
- Kazakhstan (9)
- Malaysia (2)
- Mexico (1)
- Mongolia (1)
- Singapore (2)
- South Africa (2)
- Uzbekistan (3)
- Vietnam (5)

== Footnotes ==
Notes
