= 2025 World Para Swimming Championships – Men's 100 metre backstroke =

The Men's 100 metre backstroke events at the 2025 World Para Swimming Championships were held at the Singapore Sports Hub between 21 and 27 September 2025.

== Schedule ==
Eleven events for men will be held across the following schedule:

Men's 100 metre backstroke
Day	Date	Classifications
Day 1	21 Sept	S6; S12
Day 2	22 Sept	S8; S14
Day 3	23 Sept	S1*; S2*
Day 4	24 Sept	S7; S13
Day 5	25 Sept	-
Day 6	26 Sept	S9; S11
Day 7	27 Sept	S10

== Medal summary ==
Event	Gold	Silver	Bronze
S1	Anton Kol; Ukraine	Francesco Bettella; Italy	Iyad Shalabi; Israel
S2	Gabriel Araújo; Brazil	Vladimir Danilenko; Individual Neutral Athletes	Jacek Czech; Poland
S6	Yang Hong; China	Dino Sinovcic; Croatia	Antonio Fantin; Italy
S7	Andrii Trusov; Ukraine	Federico Bicelli; Italy	Christian Sadie; South Africa
S8	Inigo Llopis Sanz; Spain	Eduard Horodianyn; Ukraine	Turgut Aslan Yaraman; Turkey
S9	Yahor Shchalkanau; Individual Neutral Athletes	Bogdan Mozgovoi; Individual Neutral Athletes	Ugo Didier; France
S10	Olivier van de Voort; Netherlands	Thomas Gallagher; Australia	Bas Takken; Netherlands
S11	Albert Gelis; Spain	David Kratochvíl; Czech Republic	Danylo Chufarov; Ukraine
S12	Raman Salei; Azerbaijan	Maksim Vashkevich; Individual Neutral Athletes	Evan Wilkerson; United States
S13	Egor Bolotov; Uzbekistan	Thomas van Wanrooij; Netherlands	Oleksii Virchenko; Ukraine
S14	Benjamin Hance; Australia	Gabriel Bandeira; Brazil	William Ellard; Great Britain

== Race summaries ==
=== S1 ===
The Men's 100 metre backstroke S1 event was held on the evening of the 23 September.

The relevant records at the beginning of the event were as follows:

Record	Athlete	Time	Date	City	Country
World	Hennadii Boiko (UKR)	2:08.01	2016-09-09	Rio de Janeiro	Brazil
Championship	Kamil Otowski (POL)	2:18.60	2023-08-02	Manchester	United Kingdom
Americas	José Ronaldo da Silva (BRA)	2:51.75	2025-09-06	São Paulo	Brazil
European	Hennadii Boiko (UKR)	2:08.01	2016-09-09	Rio de Janeiro	Brazil

==== Final ====
Seven swimmers, representing six nations, took part in a direct final.

Rank	Lane	Athlete	Class	Result	Notes
1st place, gold medalist(s)	5	Anton Kol (UKR)	S1	2:36.54	
2nd place, silver medalist(s)	3	Francesco Bettella (ITA)	S1	2:39.58	
3rd place, bronze medalist(s)	4	Iyad Shalabi (ISR)	S1	2:40.20	
4	6	José Ronaldo da Silva (BRA)	S1	2:53.88	AM
5	2	Dimitrios Karypidis (GRE)	S1	3:20.62	
6	7	Nikolaos Kontou (GRE)	S1	3:44.21	
7	1	Miguel Navarro (ESP)	S1	3:54.77	

=== S2 ===
The Men's 100 metres backstroke S2 event was held on the evening of 23 September.

The relevant records leading into the event were as follows:

Record	Athlete	Time	Date	City	Country
World	Zou Liankang (CHN)	1:45.25	2016-09-09	Rio de Janeiro	Brazil
Championship	Gabriel Araújo (BRA)	1:55.34	2023-08-02	Manchester	United Kingdom
African	David Mc Klopper (RSA)	3:34.69	2017-12-07	Mexico City	Mexico
Americas	Gabriel Araújo (BRA)	1:53.67	2024-08-29	Paris	France
Asian	Zou Liankang (CHN)	1:45.25	2016-09-09	Rio de Janeiro	Brazil
European	Serhii Palamarchuk (UKR)	1:49.76	2016-09-09	Rio de Janeiro	Brazil

==== Final ====
Seven swimmers took part, in a direct final.

Rank	Lane	Athlete	Class	Result	Notes
1st place, gold medalist(s)	4	Gabriel Araújo (BRA)	S2	1:54.58	CR
2nd place, silver medalist(s)	5	Vladimir Danilenko (AIN)	S2	2:02.29	
3rd place, bronze medalist(s)	6	Jacek Czech (POL)	S2	2:03.87	
4	3	Alberto Abarza (CHI)	S2	2:06.74	
5	2	Rodrigo Santillan (PER)	S2	2:17.98	
6	7	Jesus Rey Lopez (MEX)	S2	2:38.17	
7	1	Conrad Hildebrand (SWE)	S2	2:58.54	

=== S6 ===
The Men's 100 metre backstroke S6 event was held on the morning and afternoon of 21 September.

The relevant records in this event leading into the championships were as follows:

Record	Athlete	Time	Date	City	Country
World	Zheng Tao (CHN)	1:10.84	2016-09-08	Rio de Janeiro	Brazil
Championship	Zheng Tao (CHN)	1:12.94	2015-07-18	Glasgow	United Kingdom
African	Ahmed Ali (EGY)	1:25.78	2017-12-05	Mexico City	Mexico
Americas	Talisson Glock (BRA)	1:13.52	2015-07-18	Glasgow	United Kingdom
Asian	Zheng Tao (CHN)	1:10.84	2016-09-08	Rio de Janeiro	Brazil
European	Aleksei Ganiuk (AIN)	1:13.47	2024-04-21	Funchal	Portugal
Oceanian	Matthew Haanappel (AUS)	1:21.25	2012-08-30	London	United Kingdom

==== Heats ====
Ten swimmers took part, representing seven nations and one neutral athlete. The top eight progress to the final.

Rank	Heat	Lane	Athlete	Class	Result	Notes
1	1	5	Dino Sinovcic (CRO)	S6	1:17.25	Q
2	1	4	Yang Hong (CHN)	S6	1:17.43	Q
3	1	6	Luo Yanbo (CHN)	S6	1:19.04	Q
4	1	8	Laurent Chardard (FRA)	S6	1:19.28	Q
5	1	7	Mikhail Evseenko (AIN)	S6	1:19.53	Q
6	1	2	Antonio Fantin (ITA)	S6	1:22.45	Q
7	1	1	David Sanchez Sierra (ESP)	S6	1:23.14	Q
8	1	0	Jesus Alberto Gutierrez (MEX)	S6	1:24.68	Q
9	1	9	Raul Gutierrez (MEX)	S6	1:26.80	Q
	1	3	Matias de Andrade (ARG)	S6		DNS

==== Final ====
Rank	Lane	Athlete	Class	Result	Notes
1st place, gold medalist(s)	5	Yang Hong (CHN)	S6	1:14.94	
2nd place, silver medalist(s)	4	Dino Sinovcic (CRO)	S6	1:15.88	
3rd place, bronze medalist(s)	7	Antonio Fantin (ITA)	S6	1:16.07	
4	6	Laurent Chardard (FRA)	S6	1:17.11	
5	3	Luo Yanbo (CHN)	S6	1:17.78	
6	2	Mikhail Evseenko (AIN)	S6	1:19.42	
7	1	David Sanchez Sierra (ESP)	S6	1:22.78	
8	8	Jesus Alberto Gutierrez (MEX)	S6	1:23.61	

=== S7 ===
The Men's 100 metre backstroke S7 event was held on the morning and evening of 24 September. Ten swimmers took part, with the top eight progressing to the final.

The relevant records in this event leading into the championships were as follows:

Record	Athlete	Time	Date	City	Country
World	Andrii Trusov (UKR)	1:07.60	2024-04-24	Funchal	Portugal
Championship	Bohdan Hrynenko (UKR)	1:08.92	2019-09-12	London	United Kingdom
African	Christian Sadie (RSA)	1:12.99	2023-08-03	Manchester	United Kingdom
Americas	Pipo Carlomagno (ARG)	1:08.83	2021-08-30	Tokyo	Japan
Asian	Nan Gao (CHN)	1:14.71	2012-08-30	London	United Kingdom
European	Andrii Trusov (UKR)	1:07.60	2024-04-24	Funchal	Portugal
Oceanian	Michael Ardern (NZL)	1:19.27	2010-05-31	Manchester	United Kingdom

==== Heats ====
Rank	Heat	Lane	Athlete	Class	Result	Notes
1	1	4	Andrii Trusov (UKR)	S7	1:12.86	Q
2	1	3	Aleksei Ganiuk (AIN)	S7	1:13.79	Q
3	1	6	Christian Sadie (RSA)	S7	1:14.67	Q
4	1	5	Federico Bicelli (ITA)	S7	1:17.56	Q
5	1	8	Sardor Bakhtiyorov (UZB)	S7	1:18.45	Q
6	1	2	Jurijs Semjonovs (LAT)	S7	1:18.64	Q
7	1	7	Wei Soong Toh (SGP)	S7	1:19.45	Q
8	1	1	Huang Xianquan (CHN)	S7	1:22.75	Q
9	1	0	Yaroslav Karpenko (UKR)	S7	1:23.14	

==== Final ====
Rank	Lane	Athlete	Class	Result	Notes
1st place, gold medalist(s)	4	Andrii Trusov (UKR)	S7	1:09.60	
2nd place, silver medalist(s)	6	Federico Bicelli (ITA)	S7	1:12.17	
3rd place, bronze medalist(s)	3	Christian Sadie (RSA)	S7	1:13.03	
4	5	Aleksei Ganiuk (AIN)	S7	1:13.15	
5	1	Wei Soong Toh (SGP)	S7	1:17.50	
6	2	Sardor Bakhtiyorov (UZB)	S7	1:18.87	
7	7	Jurijs Semjonovs (LAT)	S7	1:20.37	
8	8	Huang Xianquan (CHN)	S7	1:22.97	

=== S8 ===
The Men's 100 metre backstroke S8 event was held on the morning and afternoon of 22 September.

The relevant records in this event leading into the championships were as follows:

Record	Athlete	Time	Date	City	Country
World	Robert Griswold (USA)	1:02.55	2021-08-27	Tokyo	Japan
Championship	Konstantin Lisenkov (RUS)	1:03.32	2013-08-12	Montreal	Canada
African	Cristiaan Du Plessis (RSA)	1:14.71	2010-08-15	Eindhoven	Netherlands
Americas	Robert Griswold (USA)	1:02.55	2021-08-27	Tokyo	Japan
Asian	Zhou Cong (CHN)	1:02.90	2016-09-13	Rio de Janeiro	Brazil
European	Konstantin Lisenkov (RUS)	1:03.32	2013-08-12	Montreal	Canada
Oceanian	Peter Leek (AUS)	1:05.56	2010-08-15	Eindhoven	Netherlands

==== Heats ====
Thirteen swimmers representing seven nations and one neutral athlete, took part, with the top eight progressing to the final.

Rank	Heat	Lane	Athlete	Class	Result	Notes
1	2	4	Inigo Llopis Sanz (ESP)	S8	1:06.41	Q
2	1	4	Eduard Horodianyn (UKR)	S8	1:06.64	Q
3	2	5	Kota Kubota (JPN)	S8	1:07.29	Q
4	1	3	Kotaro Ogiwara (JPN)	S8	1:07.63	Q
5	1	6	Reid Maxwell (CAN)	S8	1:10.22	Q
6	1	2	Azizbek Boynazarov (UZB)	S8	1:11.14	Q
7	2	1	Maksim Baskakov (AIN)	S8	1:11.56	Q
8	1	5	Bohdan Hrynenko (UKR)	S8	1:11.73	Q
9	2	2	Sergio Martos Minguet (ESP)	S8	1:11.89	
10	2	7	Yevhenii Mandryka (UKR)	S8	1:12.93	
11	1	7	Marco Ozaeta Velasco (ESP)	S8	1:14.65	
12	2	3	Turgut Aslan Yaraman (TUR)	S8	1:07.41	
	2	6	Liu Fengqi (CHN)	S8		DSQ

==== Final ====
Rank	Lane	Athlete	Class	Result	Notes
1st place, gold medalist(s)	4	Inigo Llopis Sanz (ESP)	S8	1:05.29	
2nd place, silver medalist(s)	5	Eduard Horodianyn (UKR)	S8	1:06.18	
3rd place, bronze medalist(s)	6	Turgut Aslan Yaraman (TUR)	S8	1:06.52	
4	3	Kota Kubota (JPN)	S8	1:07.62	
5	2	Kotaro Ogiwara (JPN)	S8	1:07.71	
6	7	Reid Maxwell (CAN)	S8	1:08.34	
7	1	Azizbek Boynazarov (UZB)	S8	1:11.15	
8	9	Maksim Baskakov (AIN)	S8	1:11.29	

=== S9 ===
The Men's 100 metre backstroke S9 event will be held on 26 September.

The relevant records in this event leading into the championships were as follows:

Record	Athlete	Time	Date	City	Country
World	Simone Barlaam (ITA)	0:59.72	2022-06-17	Funchal	Portugal
Championship	Simone Barlaam (ITA)	0:59.72	2022-06-17	Funchal	Portugal
African	Mohammed Reda Dakouane (MAR)	1:11.17	2024-06-07	Limoges	France
Americas	Justin Zook (USA)	1:01.75	2012-06-15	Bismarck	United States
Asian	Zhou Cong (CHN)	1:03.20	2019-09-10	London	United Kingdom
European	Simone Barlaam (ITA)	0:59.72	2022-06-17	Funchal	Portugal
Oceanian	Timothy Hodge (AUS)	1:01.74	2023-02-17	Melbourne	Australia

==== Heats ====
Twelve swimmers will take part, representing seven nations and two neutral athletes, with the top eight progressing to the final

Rank	Heat	Lane	Athlete	Time	Note
1	1	4	Yahor Shchalkanau (AIN)	1:01.76	Q
2	2	4	Ugo Didier (FRA)	1:03.35	Q
3	2	5	Bogdan Mozgovoi (AIN)	1:03.66	Q
4	1	5	Timothy Hodge (AUS)	1:03.68	Q
5	2	3	Victor dos Santos Almeida (BRA)	1:04.30	Q
6	2	2	Sam de Visser (BEL)	1:05.64	Q
7	1	3	Barry McClements (IRL)	1:05.76	Q
8	2	6	Oliwier Krzyszkowski (POL)	1:06.34	Q
9	1	6	Harrison Vig (AUS)	1:07.48	R
10	1	7	Tommaso Wulzer (ITA)	1:07.65	R
11	2	7	Brenden Hall (AUS)	1:07.68	R
	1	2	Jendi Pangabean (INA)	DSQ	

==== Final ====
Rank	Lane	Athlete	Time	Note
1st place, gold medalist(s)	4	Yahor Shchalkanau (AIN)	1:00.95	
2nd place, silver medalist(s)	3	Bogdan Mozgovoi (AIN)	1:01.30	
3rd place, bronze medalist(s)	5	Ugo Didier (FRA)	1:02.08	
4	2	Victor Dos Santos Almeida (BRA)	1:03.04	
5	6	Timothy Hodge (AUS)	1:03.20	
6	1	Barry Mcclements (IRL)	1:04.51	
7	7	Sam De Visser (BEL)	1:06.00	
8	8	Oliwier Krzyszkowski (POL)	1:06.82	

=== S10 ===
The Men's 100 metre backstroke S10 event will be held on the morning and evening of 27 September. Nine swimmers representing six nations will take part, with the top eight progressing to the final.

The relevant records at the beginning of the event were as follows:

Record	Athlete	Time	Date	City	Country
World	Maksym Krypak (UKR)	0:57.19	2021-09-02	Tokyo	Japan
Championship	Maksym Krypak (UKR)	0:58.00	2019-09-14	London	United Kingdom
African	Achmat Hassiem (RSA)	1:10.96	2011-08-12	Edmonton, Alberta	Canada
Americas	Andre Brasil (BRA)	0:59.55	2016-09-10	Rio de Janeiro	Brazil
Asian	Akito Minai (JPN)	1:04.12	2024-09-06	Paris	France
European	Maksym Krypak (UKR)	0:57.19	2021-09-02	Tokyo	Japan
Oceanian	Michael Anderson (AUS)	1:00.87	2014-08-09	Pasadena	United States

==== Heats ====
Rank	Heat	Lane	Athlete	Time	Note
1	1	4	Olivier van de Voort (NED)	58.87	Q
2	1	7	Stanislav Popov (UKR)	1:02.30	Q
3	1	6	Bas Takken (NED)	1:02.34	Q
4	1	2	Ihor Nimchenko (UKR)	1:03.05	Q
5	1	1	Joao Fidalgo (POR)	1:04.26	Q
6	1	3	Riccardo Menciotti (ITA)	1:05.07	Q
7	1	8	Tomas Cordeiro (POR)	1:06.67	Q
8	1	5	Thomas Gallagher (AUS)	1:12.57	Q
			Turki Alharbi (KSA)	DNS	

==== Final ====
Rank	Lane	Athlete	Time	Note
1st place, gold medalist(s)	4	Olivier van de Voort (NED)	58.53	
2nd place, silver medalist(s)	8	Thomas Gallagher (AUS)	1:00.96	
3rd place, bronze medalist(s)	3	Bas Takken (NED)	1:01.23	
4	7	Riccardo Menciotti (ITA)	1:01.24	
5	6	Ihor Nimchenko (UKR)	1:01.49	
6	5	Stanislav Popov (UKR)	1:01.91	
7	2	Joao Fidalgo (POR)	1:03.64	
8	1	Tomas Cordeiro (POR)	1:05.32	

=== S11 ===
The Men's 100 metre backstroke S11 event will be held on the morning and evening of 26 September. . Reigning champion, Paralympic champion and world record holder Mykhailo Serbin of Ukraine will defend his title.

The relevant records in this event leading into the championships were as follows:

Record	Athlete	Time	Date	City	Country
World	Mykhailo Serbin (UKR)	1:05.84	2024-09-01	Paris	France
Championship	Mykhailo Serbin (UKR)	1:06.01	2023-08-05	Manchester	United Kingdom
African	Hendri Herbst (RSA)	1:14.44	2016-09-09	Rio de Janeiro	Brazil
Americas	Bradley Snyder (USA)	1:08.28	2016-09-09	Rio de Janeiro	Brazil
Asian	Yang Bozun (CHN)	1:07.74	2008-09-13	Beijing	China
European	Mykhailo Serbin (UKR)	1:05.84	2024-09-01	Paris	France
Oceanian	Jeremy McClure (AUS)	1:12.51	2019-09-10	London	United Kingdom

==== Heats ====
Nine swimmers will take part from seven nation, with the top eight progressing to the final

Rank	Heat	Lane	Athlete	Time	Note
1	1	5	Albert Gelis (ESP)	1:06.97	Q
2	1	4	Mykhailo Serbin (UKR)	1:10.01	Q
3	1	3	David Kratochvil (CZE)	1:10.02	Q
4	1	2	Marco Meneses (POR)	1:10.03	Q
5	1	6	Danylo Chufarov (UKR)	1:11.10	Q
6	1	7	Li Zhixin (CHN)	1:11.16	Q
7	1	8	Himanshu Nandal (IND)	1:12.78	Q
8	1	0	Simonas Zvirblis (LTU)	1:18.29	Q
9	1	1	Hua Dongdong (CHN)	1:18.52	R

==== Final ====
Rank	Lane	Athlete	Time	Note
1st place, gold medalist(s)	4	Albert Gelis (ESP)	1:05.14	WR
2nd place, silver medalist(s)	3	David Kratochvil (CZE)	1:06.93	
3rd place, bronze medalist(s)	2	Danylo Chufarov (UKR)	1:07.10	
4	5	Mykhailo Serbin (UKR)	1:07.48	
5	7	Zhixin Li (CHN)	1:09.69	
6	6	Marco Meneses (POR)	1:09.95	
7	1	Himanshu Nandal (IND)	1:12.04	
8	8	Simonas Zvirblis (LTU)	1:16.91	

=== S12 ===
The Men's 100 metre backstroke S12 event was held on the morning and evening of 21 September.

The relevant records heading into the event were as follows:

Record	Athlete	Time	Date	City	Country
World	Stephen Clegg (GBR)	0:59.02	2024-08-31	Paris	France
Championship	Yaroslav Denysenko (UKR)	0:59.40	2019-09-09	London	United Kingdom
African	Franco Smit (RSA)	1:04.40	2019-09-09	London	United Kingdom
Americas	Tucker Dupree (USA)	0:59.71	2014-04-20	Glasgow	United Kingdom
Asian	Maulana Rifky Yavianda (INA)	1:03.55	2023-10-23	Hangzhou	China
European	Stephen Clegg (GBR)	0:59.02	2024-08-31	Paris	France
Oceanian	Jeremy McClure (AUS)	1:05.95	2008-09-13	Beijing	China

==== Heats ====
Eleven swimmers took part, representing seven nations and four neutral athletes, with the top eight progressing to the final.

Rank	Heat	Lane	Athlete	Class	Result	Notes
1	2	4	Raman Salei (AZE)	S12	1:02.00	Q
2	2	5	Maksim Vashkevich (AIN)	S12	1:03.25	Q
3	1	4	Dzmitry Salei (AIN)	S12	1:04.00	Q
4	2	3	Evan Wilkerson (USA)	S12	1:04.25	Q
5	1	3	Arsenii Berezhnoi (AIN)	S12	1:05.20	Q
6	1	5	Douglas Matera (BRA)	S12	1:05.29	Q
7	2	6	Alex Villarejo Martin (ESP)	S12	1:05.83	Q
8	1	6	Egor Kuzmin (AIN)	S12	1:09.17	Q
9	2	2	Roman Mychka (UKR)	S12	1:10.34	
10	1	2	Mohammadhossein Abadi (IRI)	S12	1:13.18	
11	2	6	Serghei Sirovatchin (MDA)	S12	1:20.45	

==== Final ====
Rank	Lane	Athlete	Class	Result	Notes
1st place, gold medalist(s)	4	Raman Salei (AZE)	S12	1:01.58	
2nd place, silver medalist(s)	5	Maksim Vashkevich (AIN)	S12	1:02.17	
3rd place, bronze medalist(s)	6	Evan Wilkerson (USA)	S12	1:03.05	
4	3	Dzmitry Salei (AIN)	S12	1:03.58	
5	7	Douglas Matera (BRA)	S12	1:04.24	
6	2	Arsenii Berezhnoi (AIN)	S12	1:04.58	
7	1	Alex Villarejo Martin (ESP)	S12	1:06.00	
8	8	Egor Kuzmin (AIN)	S12	1:09.40	

=== S13 ===
The Men's 100 metre backstroke S13 event was held on the morning and evening of 24 September. Twelve swimmers took part, representing nine nations and neutral athletes with the top eight progressing to the final.

The relevant records in this event leading into the championships were as follows:

Record	Athlete	Time	Date	City	Country
World	Ihar Boki (BLR)	0:56.36	2021-08-26	Tokyo	Japan
Championship	Ihar Boki (BLR)	0:56.74	2015-07-15	Glasgow	United Kingdom
African	Charles Bouwer (RSA)	0:59.52	2013-08-17	Montreal	Canada
Americas	Nicolas Guy Turbide (CAN)	0:59.28	2018-08-12	Cairns	Australia
Asian	Egor Bolotov (UZB)	0:58.83	2024-06-07	Limoges	France
European	Ihar Boki (BLR)	0:56.36	2021-08-26	Tokyo	Japan
Oceanian	Sean Russo (AUS)	1:01.01	2013-08-17	Montreal	Canada

==== Heats ====
Rank	Heat	Lane	Athlete	Class	Result	Notes
1	2	4	Egor Bolotov (UZB)	S13	59.31	Q
2	1	6	Nicolas Guy Turbide (CAN)	S13	1:00.07	Q
3	2	5	Oleksii Virchenko (UKR)	S13	1:00.46	Q
4	1	5	Thomas van Wanrooij (NED)	S13	1:00.72	Q
5	2	6	Evgenii Lazutin (AIN)	S13	1:01.67	Q
6	1	3	Gabriel Steen (NOR)	S13	1:01.83	Q
7	2	3	Enrique Mollar (ESP)	S13	1:02.36	Q
8	1	2	Genki Saito (JPN)	S13	1:03.31	Q
9	2	7	Yauheni Kavalionak (AIN)	S13	1:03.52	
10	2	2	Nathan Hendricks (RSA)	S13	1:03.54	
11	1	7	Pedro Fernandez Garcia (ESP)	S13	1:07.07	

==== Final ====
Rank	Lane	Athlete	Class	Result	Notes
1st place, gold medalist(s)	4	Egor Bolotov (UZB)	S13	58.97	
2nd place, silver medalist(s)	6	Thomas van Wanrooij (NED)	S13	59.35	
3rd place, bronze medalist(s)	3	Oleksii Virchenko (UKR)	S13	59.45	
4	5	Nicolas Guy Turbide (CAN)	S13	59.87	
5	1	Enrique Mollar (ESP)	S13	1:00.46	
6	7	Gabriel Steen (NOR)	S13	1:01.09	
7	2	Evgenii Lazutin (AIN)	S13	1:01.54	
8	8	Genki Saito (JPN)	S13	1:03.00	

=== S14 ===
The Men's 100 metre backstroke S14 event was held on the morning and evening of 22 September. Reigning champion and world record holder Benjamin Hance of Australia returns to defend his title.

The relevant records in this event leading into the championships were as follows:

Record	Athlete	Time	Date	City	Country
World	Benjamin Hance (AUS)	0:56.35	2025-06-13	Adelaide	Australia
Championship	Benjamin Hance (AUS)	0:57.26	2023-08-01	Manchester	United Kingdom
African	Record Mark (IPC)	1:02.36			
Americas	Gabriel Bandeira (BRA)	0:57.65	2025-05-24	São Paulo	Brazil
Asian	Inkook Lee (KOR)	0:59.82	2016-09-08	Rio de Janeiro	Brazil
European	Mark Tompsett (GBR)	0:58.28	2025-04-17	London	United Kingdom
Oceanian	Benjamin Hance (AUS)	0:56.35	2025-06-13	Adelaide	Australia

==== Heats ====
Twelve swimmers representing nine nations took part, with the top eight progressing to the final.

Rank	Heat	Lane	Athlete	Class	Result	Notes
1	2	4	Benjamin Hance (AUS)	S14	55.99	WR
2	2	5	Mark Tompsett (GBR)	S14	58.70	
3	1	5	Arthur Xavier Ribeiro (BRA)	S14	59.61	
4	2	3	William Ellard (GBR)	S14	1:00.34	
5	1	4	Gabriel Bandeira (BRA)	S14	1:01.00	
6	2	6	Declan Budd (AUS)	S14	1:01.32	
7	2	2	Vasyl Krainyk (UKR)	S14	1:01.70	
8	1	6	Natirat Meeprom (THA)	S14	1:02.00	
9	1	2	Inkook Lee (KOR)	S14	1:02.49	
10	2	7	Rei Kagose (JPN)	S14	1:03.26	
11	1	7	Ariel Alegarbes (PHI)	S14	1:03.76	

==== Final ====
Rank	Lane	Athlete	Class	Result	Notes
1st place, gold medalist(s)	4	Benjamin Hance (AUS)	S14	56.25	
2nd place, silver medalist(s)	2	Gabriel Bandeira (BRA)	S14	58.37	
3rd place, bronze medalist(s)	6	William Ellard (GBR)	S14	58.95	
4	5	Mark Tompsett (GBR)	S14	59.08	
5	3	Arthur Xavier Ribeiro (BRA)	S14	59.86	
6	7	Declan Budd (AUS)	S14	1:01.23	
7	1	Vasyl Krainyk (UKR)	S14	1:01.97	
8	8	Natirat Meeprom (THA)	S14	1:01.99	
