= Sergey Zhilkin =

Russian swimming coach

Sergey Valentinovich Zhilkin
- Born: October 30, 1959 (age 66)
- Education: State Central Order of Lenin Institute of Physical Culture
- Occupation: Swimming coach
- Children: Sergey (1989), Andrey Zhilkin (1995)
- Awards: Honored Coach of Russia; Order of Friendship; Order of Honour; Medal of the Order "For Merit to the Fatherland"

Sergey Valentinovich Zhilkin (Russian: Сергей Валентинович Жилкин; born October 30, 1959) is a Russian swimming coach, Master of Sport of the USSR, Honored Coach of Russia, and recipient of the Order of Friendship, Order of Honour, and the Medal of the Order "For Merit to the Fatherland" II class. He serves as Deputy Head of the Complex Scientific Group of the Russian national swimming team and as a coach at the Yunost Moskvy Sports School of Olympic Reserve.

== Biography ==
Sergey Valentinovich Zhilkin graduated from the State Central Order of Lenin Institute of Physical Culture (SCOLIPC) in 1984. He was awarded the title of Master of Sport of the USSR in 1983. After graduating, he worked for about 10 years at the Department of Swimming at SCOLIPC and was a member of the Complex Scientific Group (CSG) for the trade union sports schools of the RSFSR.

In the 1990s, he worked with members of the national swimming teams of Vietnam and Malaysia.

Since 1987, Zhilkin has been working as a swimming coach and instructor. He is currently a coach-instructor at the State Budgetary Institution of the City of Moscow "Physical Culture and Sports Association 'Yunost Moskvy' of the Department of Sports of the City of Moscow". He also serves as Deputy Head of the Complex Scientific Group of the Russian national swimming team.

Since 2018, he has been coaching Daria Pikalova, silver medalist at the 2019 International Paralympic Committee World Championships.

In 2025, Zhilkin began working with Kirill, a young swimmer from Cheboksary born without arms, who is preparing for the Paralympic Games. The athlete's parents bring him to Moscow for training every month despite financial challenges.

== Achievements and notable students ==
Among Sergei Valentinovich Zhilkin’s students are:

- Andrey Zhilkin – 2018 European Champion as part of the 4x100 m freestyle relay team. Multiple-time Russian champion and former Russian record holder. Honoured Master of Sport of Russia (2020).
- Vsevolod Zanko – Multiple-time Russian champion, medalist at World and European Junior Championships, finalist at the World Championships, semi-finalist at the Olympic Games in Rio de Janeiro, Master of Sport of Russia, International Class.
- Alexander Osipenko – Russian Champion (2017 – 200 m individual medley, 400 m individual medley). Silver medalist (2015, 2016 – 400 m individual medley) and bronze medalist (2014 – 400 m individual medley) at the Russian Championships.
- Olesya Vladykina – Two-time Paralympic champion (2008, 2012), world champion, European champion, world record holder.
- Sergei Punko – Multiple-time champion and medalist at the Paralympic Games in swimming, multiple-time world champion and multiple-time Russian champion. Honoured Master of Sport of Belarus and Honoured Master of Sport of Russia.
- Roman Makarov – Six-time champion of the Summer Paralympic Games, eight-time world champion, Honoured Master of Sport of Russia.
- Sergei Zhilkin (Jr.) – Finalist at the first FINA World Junior Swimming Championships in Rio de Janeiro, Head of the Russian national swimming team.

== Awards ==
- Honored Coach of Russia (2009).
- Order of Friendship (2010).
- Order of Honour (2013).
- Medal of the Order “For Merit to the Fatherland” II class (2020).
