= Vadim Labokha =

Russian swimming coach

Vadim Petrovich Labokha
- Born: March 20, 1983 (age 43)
- Education: Polotsk State University (Physical Education; Economics and Management)
- Occupation: Swimming coach
- Awards: Honored Coach of Russia; Medal of the Order "For Merit to the Fatherland" II class

Vadim Petrovich Labokha (Russian: Вадим Петрович Лабоха; born 20 March 1983) is a Russian swimming coach, Honored Coach of Russia, Master of Sport of the Republic of Belarus in swimming, and a bronze medalist at the 8th Republican Youth Games. He has coached the Russian national Paralympic swimming team.

== Biography ==
Labokha began swimming in 1989. In 2000, he became a Master of Sport of the Republic of Belarus in swimming and won a bronze medal at the 8th Republican Youth Games.

He graduated from Polotsk State University with a degree in Physical Education, qualifying as a teacher of technical labor and physical education (2005). He also studied at the university's Department of Economics and Management.

He started his coaching career in 2005 and has over 20 years of coaching experience. From 2015 to 2016, he served as a coach for the Russian national Paralympic swimming team.

== Notable athletes ==
- Sergei Punko – Multiple-time champion and medalist at the Paralympic Games in swimming, multiple-time world champion and multiple-time Russian champion. Honoured Master of Sport of Belarus and Honoured Master of Sport of Russia.
- Roman Makarov – Six-time champion of the Summer Paralympic Games, eight-time world champion, Honoured Master of Sport of Russia.

== Awards and honors ==
- Honored Coach of Russia (2022)
- Medal of the Order "For Merit to the Fatherland" II class
- Moscow Mayor's Prize (2016)
- Award from "Yunost Moskvy" for coaching a medalist at the IPC World Swimming Championships (2015, UK)
- Nominee for the Presidential Scholarship
