= Swimming at the 2020 Summer Paralympics – Men's 50 metre backstroke S1 =

Men's 50 metre backstroke S1 at the XVI Paralympic Games
- Venue: Tokyo Aquatics Centre
- Dates: 2 September 2021
- Competitors: 7 from 7 nations

Medalists
| 1st place, gold medalist(s) | | Iyad Shalabi | Israel |
| 2nd place, silver medalist(s) | | Anton Kol | Ukraine |
| 3rd place, bronze medalist(s) | | Francesco Bettella | Italy |

The Men's 50 metre backstroke S1 event at the 2020 Paralympic Games took place on 2 September 2021, at the Tokyo Aquatics Centre.

== Final ==
| Rank | Lane | Name | Nationality | Time | Notes |
|---|---|---|---|---|---|
| 1st place, gold medalist(s) | 4 | Iyad Shalabi | Israel | 1.11.79 | |
| 2nd place, silver medalist(s) | 5 | Anton Kol | Ukraine | 1.13.78 | |
| 3rd place, bronze medalist(s) | 3 | Francesco Bettella | Italy | 1.14.87 | |
| 4 | 6 | Jose Ronaldo Da Silva | Brazil | 1.21.57 | AM |
| 5 | 2 | Dimitrios Karypidis | Greece | 1.25.30 | |
| 6 | 7 | Luis Eduardo Rojas | Colombia | 1.37.53 | |
| 7 | 1 | Aliaksei Talai | Belarus | 1.55.58 | |
