= Swimming at the 2016 Summer Paralympics – Men's 50 metre backstroke S1 =

Men's 50 metre backstroke S1 at the XV Paralympic Games
- Venue: Olympic Aquatics Stadium
- Dates: 15 September 2016
- Competitors: 6 from 4 nations

Medalists
1st place, gold medalist(s)		Hennadii Boiko	Ukraine
2nd place, silver medalist(s)		Francesco Bettella	Italy
3rd place, bronze medalist(s)		Anton Kol	Ukraine

The Men's 50 metre backstroke S1 event at the 2016 Paralympic Games took place on 15 September 2016, at the Olympic Aquatics Stadium. No heats were held. The swimmers with the eight fastest times advanced to the final.

== Final ==
19:36 15 September 2016:

Rank	Lane	Name	Nationality	Time	Notes
1st place, gold medalist(s)	4	Hennadii Boiko	Ukraine	1:00.85	
2nd place, silver medalist(s)	5	Francesco Bettella	Italy	1:12.49	
3rd place, bronze medalist(s)	3	Anton Kol	Ukraine	1:15.42	
4	6	Christos Tampaxis	Greece	1:22.30	
5	2	Dimitrios Karypidis	Greece	1:32.09	
6	1	Luis Rojas Osorno	Colombia	1:46.67	
