= Swimming at the 2020 Summer Paralympics – Men's 100 metre freestyle S12 =

Men's 100 metre freestyle S12 at the XVI Paralympic Games
- Venue: Tokyo Aquatics Centre
- Dates: 31 August 2021
- Competitors: 9 from 7 nations

Medalists
1st place, gold medalist(s)		Raman Salei	Azerbaijan
2nd place, silver medalist(s)		Maksym Veraksa	Ukraine
3rd place, bronze medalist(s)		Stephen Clegg	Great Britain

The men's 100 metre freestyle S12 event at the 2020 Paralympic Games took place on 31 August 2021, at the Tokyo Aquatics Centre.

== Heats ==
The swimmers with the top eight times, regardless of heat, advanced to the final.

Rank	Heat	Lane	Name	Nationality	Time	Notes
1	1	5	Stephen Clegg	Great Britain	53.84	Q
2	1	4	Raman Salei	Azerbaijan	53.89	Q
3	2	5	Braedan Jason	Australia	54.07	Q
4	2	4	Maksym Veraksa	Ukraine	54.26	Q
5	2	3	Illia Yaremenko	Ukraine	55.95	Q
6	2	6	Roman Makarov	RPC	1:01.01	Q
7	1	6	Sergey Punko	RPC	1:01.02	Q
	1	3	Charalampos Taiganidis	Greece	DNS	
	2	2	Maksim Vashkevich	Belarus	DNS	

== Final ==
100m freestyle final
Rank	Lane	Name	Nationality	Time	Notes
1st place, gold medalist(s)	5	Raman Salei	Azerbaijan	52.69	
2nd place, silver medalist(s)	6	Maksym Veraksa	Ukraine	52.87	
3rd place, bronze medalist(s)	4	Stephen Clegg	Great Britain	53.43	
4	2	Illia Yaremenko	Ukraine	53.60	
5	3	Braedan Jason	Australia	53.78	OC
6	7	Roman Makarov	RPC	57.56	
7	1	Sergey Punko	RPC	59.30	
