= 2014 IPC Swimming European Championships – Women's 4 × 50 metre freestyle relay =

The Women's 50 metre x 4 freestyle at the 2014 IPC Swimming European Championships was held at the Pieter van den Hoogenband Swimming Stadium in Eindhoven from 4–10 August.

As with other disability relay events, the freestyle works on a points system whereby the classification numbers of each swimmer are totaled to give a number no higher than 20.

== Medalists ==
Event	Gold		Silver		Bronze	
20pts	Yelyzaveta Mereshko (S6); Olena Fedota (S6); Olga Sviderska (S3); Mariia Lafina (S4); Ukraine	2:53.45	Sarah Louise Rung (S5); Mina Marie Heyerdal Klausen (S7); Sara Josefine Hanssen (S6); Ingrid Thunem (S1); Norway	3:02.43	Natalia Gavrilyuk (S4); Anastasia Diodorova (S6); Iuliia Shishova(S3); Oxana Guseva (S7); Russia	3:09.34

== See also ==
- List of IPC world records in swimming
