= Iyad Shalabi =

Arab-Israeli Paralympic swimmer

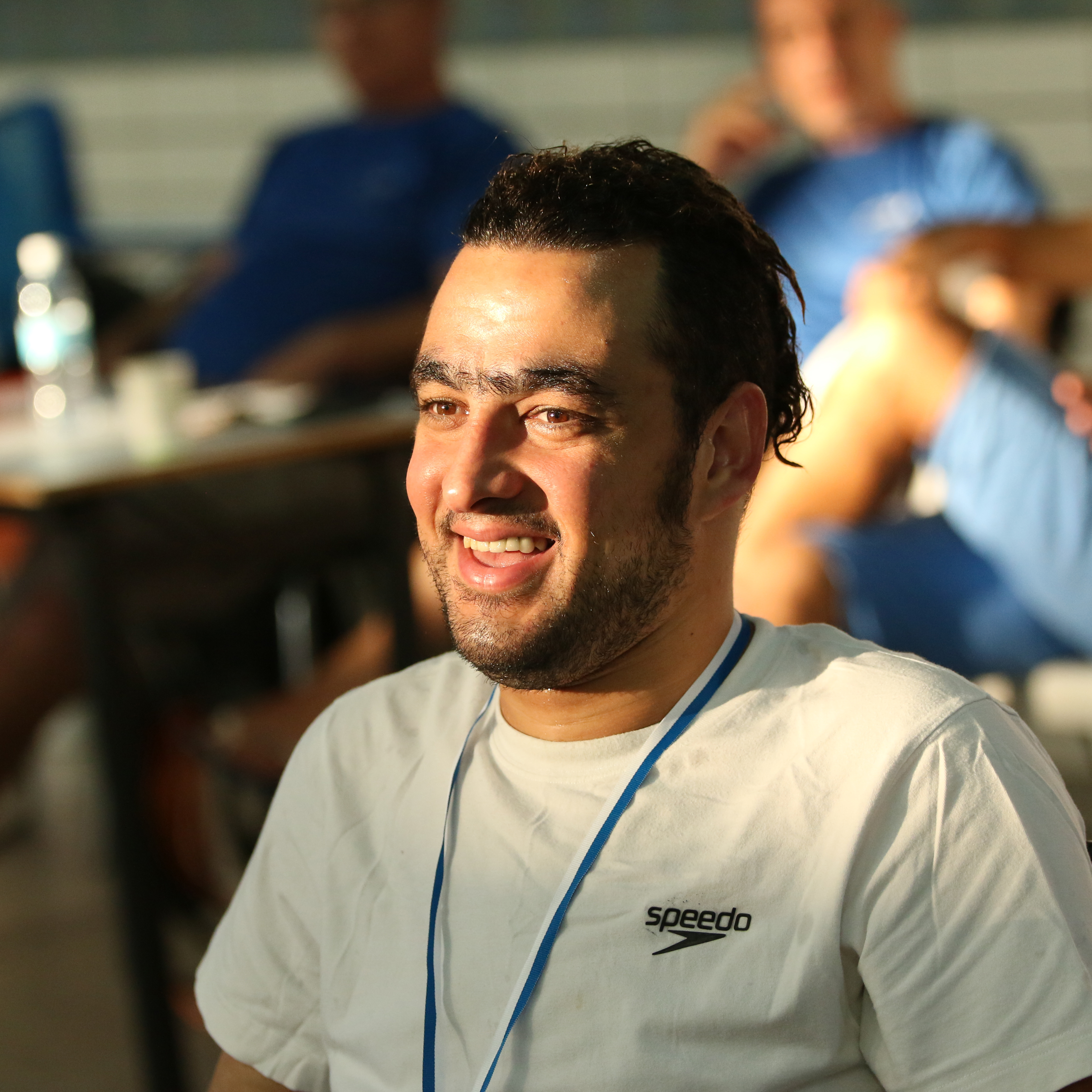

Personal information
- Native name: إياد شلبي
- Nationality: Israeli
- Born: 16 July 1987 (age 38) Shefa-Amr, Israel

Sport
- Sport: Swimming
- Strokes: freestyle backstroke
- Classifications: S1, SM1
- Club: Ilan Rehabilitation and Sports Center
- Coach: Yaacov Beininson
Medal record
Men's para swimming
Representing Israel
Paralympic Games
Gold medal – first place	2020 Tokyo	100 m backstroke S1
Gold medal – first place	2020 Tokyo	50 m backstroke S1
World Championships
Gold medal – first place	2025 Singapore	50 m backstroke S1
Silver medal – second place	2023 Manchester	50 m backstroke S1
Silver medal – second place	2025 Singapore	200 m freestyle S1
Bronze medal – third place	2023 Manchester	200 m freestyle S1
Bronze medal – third place	2025 Singapore	100 m backstroke S1
European Championships
Gold medal – first place	2020 Funchal	50 m backstroke S1
Bronze medal – third place	2018 Dublin	150 m individual medley S3
Bronze medal – third place	2020 Funchal	100 m backstroke S1

Iyad Shalabi (or Eyad Shalaby, Arabic: إياد شلبي, Hebrew: איאד שלבי; born 16 July 1987) is an Arab-Israeli Paralympic champion swimmer. Representing Israel at the 2020 Summer Paralympics in 2021 in Tokyo, Japan, Shalabi won two gold medals in swimming.

== Early life ==
Shalabi is a Muslim Israeli-Arab from Shefa-Amr, Israel. He is both deaf and paraplegic. He was deaf-mute from birth, and at 13 years of age he became paralyzed in all four limbs in an accident in which he fell from a rooftop; he now uses a wheelchair. He has a deaf and mute brother.

== Swimming career ==
He swims at the ILAn (Israel Association for Children with Disabilities) Rehabilitation and Sports Center in Haifa, Israel, and his coach is Yaacov Beininson. His father, Yusuf, goes with his mute son to all of his competitions. He competes in disability classification S1, which is for those with the most severe activity limitations.

At the 2007 Israel Swimming Championships for the Disabled he was announced as by the swimming committee as the Outstanding Swimmer for 2007.

Shalabi represented Israel in the Beijing 2008, London 2012, and Rio 2016 Paralympics.

In 2017, a documentary entitled Swimming Against the Current was screened at the Jerusalem Film Festival which had been directed and produced by Arab Assel Abu Hjoul. It followed him as he prepared for the World Championships in Glasgow.

Shalabi won a bronze medal in the 150-meter individual medley at the 2018 European Championships. He set the world record in his disability category for the 150-meter medley while winning a gold medal at the 2021 European Championships in England in May 2021.

Representing Israel at the 2020 Summer Paralympics in 2021 in Tokyo, Japan, Shalabi won gold medals in swimming at the 100m backstroke S1 event (2:28.04; ahead of Ukrainian silver medalist Anton Kol) and the 50m backstroke S1 event (1:11.79; again ahead of Kol) at 34 years of age. Shalabi was the first Arab-Israeli citizen to win an individual medal in either the Paralympics or the Olympics. Israeli President Isaac Herzog called him to congratulate him, and also congratulated Shalabi in a tweet, calling him a “champion” and “a symbol of power. We are proud of you for the gold medal. Well done!" Israeli Culture and Sports Minister Hili Tropper wrote: "Iyad is an inspiring man whose life has been full of victories. “And today, another great victory. Iyad ... filled us all with pride. We are proud of you, Iyad Shalabi!" Former Israeli Prime Minister Benjamin Netanyahu also congratulated him in a tweet.
