= Ingrid Thunem =

Norwegian Paralympic swimmer

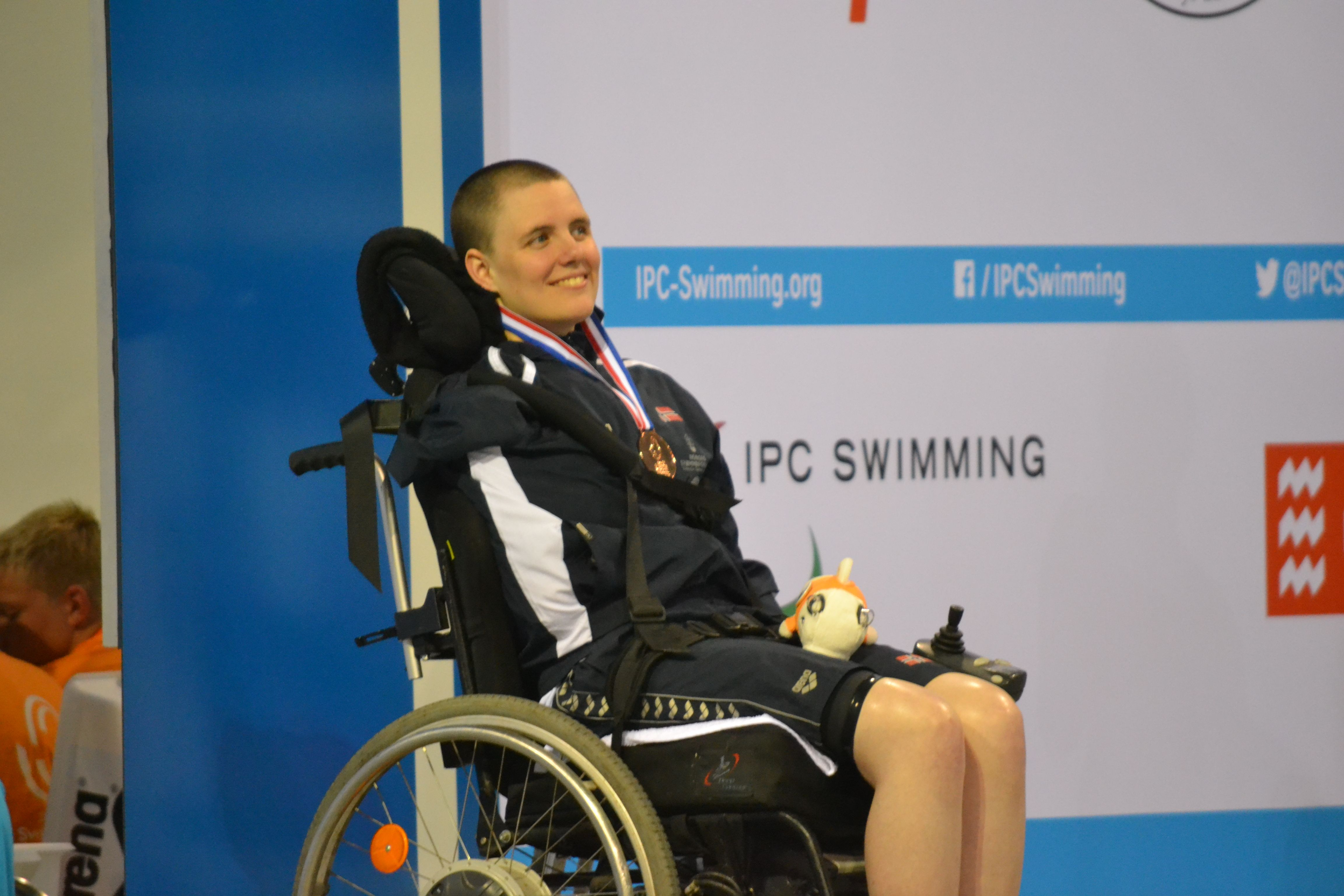
- Thunem after receiving one of her medals at the 2014 IPC Swimming European Championships

Personal information
- Nationality: Norwegian
- Born: 16 July 1989 (age 37) Nordfjordeid, Norway

Sport
- Sport: Swimming
- Strokes: Freestyle, backstroke
- Club: Tromso SK
- Coach: Morten Eklund
Medal record
Event	1st	2nd	3rd
Paralympic Games	0	0	0
World Championships	0	0	2
European Championships	1	3	2
Swimming
Representing Norway
IPC World Championships
Bronze medal – third place	2015 Glasgow	50m backstroke - S2
Bronze medal – third place	2015 Glasgow	100m backstroke - S2
IPC European Championships
Gold medal – first place	2016 Funchal	50m freestyle S2
Silver medal – second place	2014 Eindhoven	Women's 50m freestyle relay 20pts
Silver medal – second place	2014 Eindhoven	Women's 50m medley relay 20pts
Silver medal – second place	2016 Funchal	50 m backstroke – S2
Bronze medal – third place	2014 Eindhoven	100 m backstroke – S2
Bronze medal – third place	2016 Funchal	100 m backstroke – S2

Ingrid Thunem (born 17 July 1989) is a Norwegian Paralympic swimmer. She competes in S1, SB1 (breaststroke) and SM1 (individual medley) events, swimming with motor function in just one arm. She is a multiple world record holder in her classification.

== Early life ==
Thunem was born in Nordfjordeid, Norway, in 1989. She was educated at Eid High School before matriculating to University of Tromsø where she studied pedagogy.

== Swimming career ==
Thunem swam avidly as an able bodied youth, but gave it up at the age of sixteen as she did not want to sacrifice her social life. Thunem returned to swimming as part of her rehabilitation program following her first attack, and found that she had a natural ability for the sport. Initially classified as a S5 disability swimmer, after her condition worsened in 2012 she was re-classified as a S1 competitor, for athletes with the most severe limitations to their natural swimming action.

Her first major meet against international competition came at the 28th International German Championships in Berlin in May 2014. There she led the way by recording five new world records, breaking many of them by very large leads. She broke the S1 record in the 50m freestyle by 16 seconds. Her 100m freestyle time of 1:56.95 took 45 seconds from the previous world record, while she took nearly 30 seconds off the 100m backstroke world record (S1), breaking the record in the preliminary heats before lowering the time further in the finals. In the 150m individual medley (SM1) she finished in 3:45.84, three minutes and thirty-three seconds inside the world record. Her achievements at the German Championships saw Thunem named the Female Disability Swimmer of the Year by Swimming World Magazine.

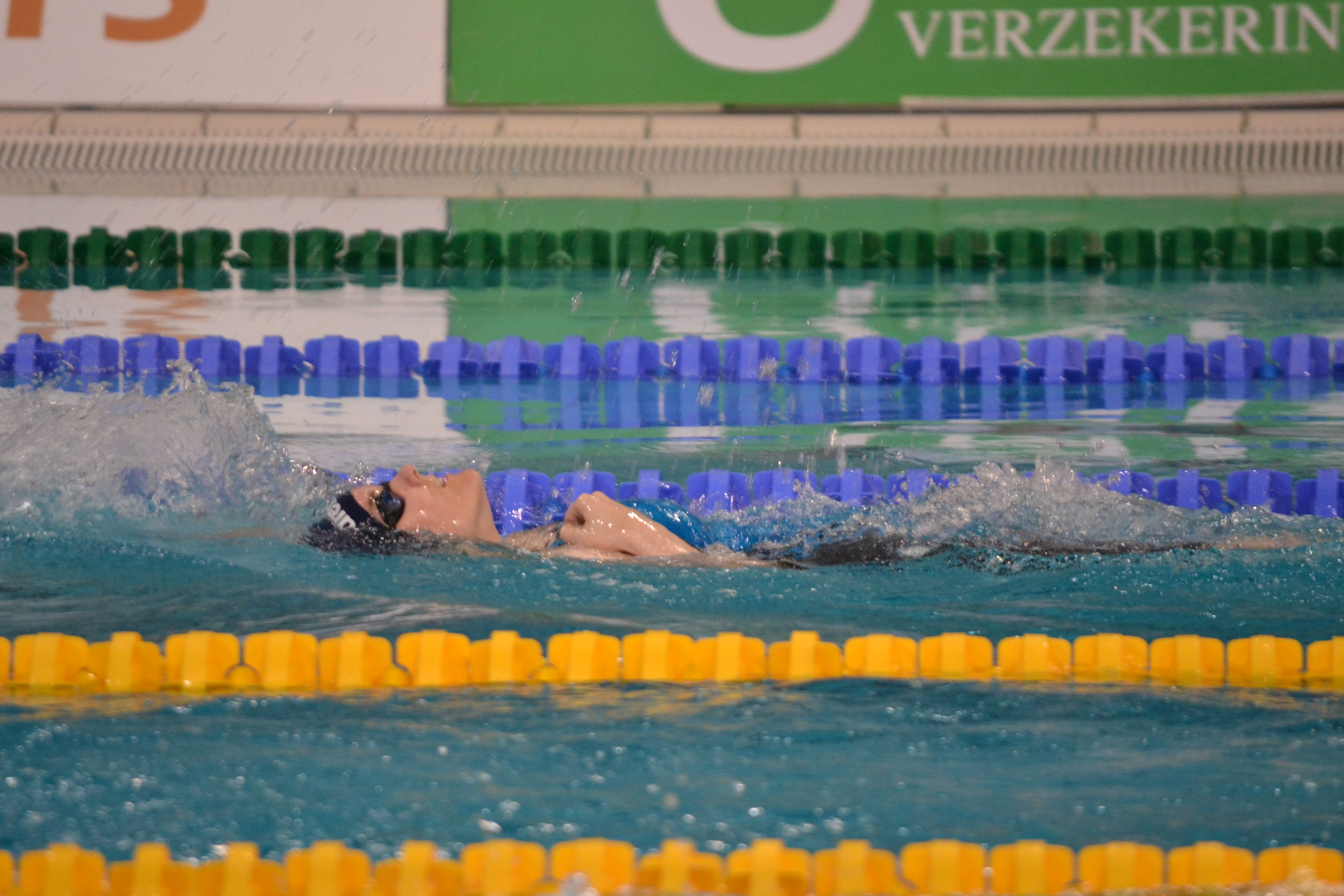
Thunem in action during the S2 backstroke at the 2014 European Championships.

Thunem followed this a few months later by competing at the 2014 IPC Swimming European Championships in Eindhoven. There were no races organised at the championships for S1 swimmers, so Thunem competed in as many races as possible in the events closest to her classification, even though that meant entering the S4 for both the 50m and 100m freestyle. She won three medals in total, the bronze in the 100m backstroke (S2), and she helped her Norwegian teammates take silver in both the Women's 50m freestyle relay (20 points) and the Women's 50m medley relay (20 points).

The following year, Thunem travelled to Glasgow to compete in the 2015 IPC Swimming World Championships. As in the European Championships the year previous, no S1 classification races were contested. Thunem was more selective on this occasion and chose only three events, the 50m backstroke (S2), 100m backstroke (S2) and the 100m breaststroke (SB4). Thunem pulled out of the breaststroke, but she won bronze medals in both of the backstroke events.

In the buildup to the 2016 Summer Paralympics Thunem appeared at her second European Championships, this time held in Funchal, Madeira. In the 50m freestyle S2 she won the gold medal, beating her closest rival and S2 competitor, Alexandra Agafonova, by over 12 seconds. Thunem added a silver in the 50m backstroke (S2) and bronze in the 100m backstroke (S2).

== Personal life ==
In 2010 Thunem contracted a neurological disease that caused paralysis, primarily in her legs for which she required a wheelchair. In 2012 her condition worsened resulting in further paralysis, this time across the whole right-hand side of her body. Thunem was hospitalized again in 2014, with a blood infection which left her comatose for a period, though she was back in training by the end of the year.

Thunem is a lesbian, and revels in her identity as belonging to "a double minority".
