= 2023 World Para Swimming Championships – Men's 200 metre freestyle =

The men's 200m freestyle events at the 2023 World Para Swimming Championships were held at the Manchester Aquatics Centre between 31 July and 6 August.

== Medalists ==
Event	Gold	Silver	Bronze
S1	Anton Kol; Ukraine	Francesco Bettella; Italy	Iyad Shalabi; Israel
S2	Gabriel Araújo; Brazil	Jacek Czech; Poland	Alberto Abarza; Chile
S3	Denys Ostapchenko; Ukraine	Vincenzo Boni; Italy	Diego López Díaz; Mexico
S4	Ami Omer Dadaon; Israel	Angel de Jesus Camacho Ramirez; Mexico	Cameron Leslie; New Zealand
S5	Francesco Bocciardo; Italy	Antoni Ponce Bertran; Spain	Luis Huerta Poza; Spain
S14	Nicholas Bennett; Canada	William Ellard; Great Britain	Jack Ireland; Australia

== Results ==
=== S1 ===
Five swimmers entered this event, which proceeded straight to final on 3 August.

Before the event, the relevant records were as follows.

Record	Swimmer	Time
World record	Itzhak Mamistvalov (ISR)	4:57.79
Championship record	Itzhak Mamistvalov (ISR)	5:04.21

Final

Rank	Name	Nation	Result	Notes
1st place, gold medalist(s)	Anton Kol	Ukraine	4:57.31	WR
2nd place, silver medalist(s)	Francesco Bettella	Italy	5:16.14	
3rd place, bronze medalist(s)	Iyad Shalabi	Israel	5:16.81	
4	Kamil Otowski	Poland	5:38.13	
5	Dimitrios Karypidis	Greece	6:20.74	

=== S2 ===
Eight swimmers entered this event, which proceeded straight to final on 3 August.

Before the event, the relevant records were as follows.

Record	Swimmer	Time
World record	Liu Benying (CHN)	3:41.54
Championship record	Gabriel Araújo (BRA)	3:59.06

Final

Rank	Name	Nation	Result	Notes
1st place, gold medalist(s)	Gabriel Araújo	Brazil	4:01.51	
2nd place, silver medalist(s)	Jacek Czech	Poland	4:22.96	
3rd place, bronze medalist(s)	Alberto Abarza	Chile	4:31.55	
4	Roman Bondarenko	Ukraine	4:39.11	
5	Rodrigo Santillan	Peru	4:47.20	
6	Jesus Rey Lopez Cervantes	Mexico	4:57.87	
7	Bruno Becker	Brazil	4:58.16	
8	Cristopher Tronco Sánchez	Mexico	5:00.14	

=== S3 ===
11 swimmers entered the competition.

The applicable records entering the event were as follows:

Record	Swimmer	Time
World record	Huang Wenpan (China)	3:09.04
Championships record	Huang Wenpan (China)	3:17.77

Heats

Rank	Heat	Lane	Name	Nation	Result	Notes
1	2	4	Denys Ostapchenko	Ukraine	3:22.01	Q
2	1	4	Vincenzo Boni	Italy	3:37.18	Q
3	2	5	Serhii Palamarchuk	Ukraine	3:41.90	Q
4	2	7	Umut Ünlü	Turkey	3:43.53	Q
5	1	5	Diego López Díaz	Mexico	3:47.41	Q
6	2	6	Krzysztof Lechniak	Poland	3:54.30	Q
7	2	3	Daniel Ferrer Robles	Turkey	4:06.55	Q
8	1	3	Marcos Zarate Rodriguez	Mexico	4:07.98	Q
9	1	6	Ioannis Kostakis	Greece	4:21.75	
10	1	2	Patricio Larenas	Chile	4:30.64	
11	2	2	Youssef Elsayed	Egypt	4:44.99	AF

Final

Rank	Name	Nation	Result	Notes
1st place, gold medalist(s)	Denys Ostapchenko	Ukraine	3:19.43	
2nd place, silver medalist(s)	Vincenzo Boni	Italy	3:37.30	
3rd place, bronze medalist(s)	Diego López Díaz	Mexico	3:42.30	
4	Umut Ünlü	Turkey	3:42.46	
5	Serhii Palamarchuk	Ukraine	3:48.58	
6	Krzysztof Lechniak	Poland	3:51.64	
7	Daniel Ferrer Robles	Spain	3:56.89	
8	Marcos Zarate Rodriguez	Mexico	4:03.73	

=== S4 ===
7 swimmers entered the competition.

The applicable records entering the event were as follows:

Record	Swimmer	Time
World record	Ami Omer Dadaon (Israel)	2:44.84
Championships record	Ami Omer Dadaon (Israel)	2:50.91

Heats

Rank	Heat	Lane	Name	Nation	Result	Notes
1	2	4	Ami Omer Dadaon	Israel	2:58.34	Q
2	1	4	Cameron Leslie	New Zealand	3:10.05	Q
3	2	5	Angel de Jesus Camacho Ramirez	Mexico	3:10.25	Q
4	2	3	Luigi Beggiato	Italy	3:10.46	Q
5	1	5	Gustavo Sánchez Martínez	Mexico	3:12.48	Q
6	1	6	Andreas Ernhofer	Austria	3:35.49	Q
7	2	6	Ariel Malyar	Israel	3:32.23	Q

Final

Rank	Athlete	Nation	Result	Notes
1st place, gold medalist(s)	Ami Omer Dadaon	Israel	2:51.58	
2nd place, silver medalist(s)	Angel de Jesus Camacho Ramirez	Mexico	3:00.63	
3rd place, bronze medalist(s)	Cameron Leslie	New Zealand	3:05.45	
4	Gustavo Sánchez Martínez	Mexico	3:06.34	
5	Luigi Beggiato	Italy	3:07.04	
6	Andreas Ernhofer	Austria	3:21.87	
7	Ariel Malyar	Israel	3:35.16	

=== S5 ===
11 swimmers entered the competition.

The applicable records entering the event were as follows:

Record	Swimmer	Time
World record	Francesco Bocciardo (Italy)	2:23.65
Championships record	Francesco Bocciardo (Italy)	2:24.11

Heats

Rank	Heat	Lane	Name	Nation	Result	Notes
1	2	4	Francesco Bocciardo	Italy	2:33.60	
2	1	4	Antoni Ponce Bertran	Spain	2:39.56	
3	1	5	Andrii Drapkin	Ukraine	2:45.41	
4	2	5	Luis Huerta Poza	Spain	2:45.66	
5	1	3	Muhammad Nur Syaiful Zulkafli	Malaysia	2:53.75	
6	2	3	Zy Kher Lee	Malaysia	2:55.98	
7	2	7	Phuchit Aingchaiyaphum	Thailand	2:56.12	
8	2	6	Zeyad Kahil	Egypt	2:56.69	
9	1	2	Alexandros-Stylianos Lergios	Greece	3:01.80	
10	1	6	Sebastián Rodríguez Veloso	Spain	3:03.14	
11	2	2	Ivo Rocha	Portugal	3:04.63	

Final

Rank	Name	Nation	Result	Notes
1st place, gold medalist(s)	Francesco Bocciardo	Italy	2:27.79	
2nd place, silver medalist(s)	Antoni Ponce Bertran	Spain	2:32.71	
3rd place, bronze medalist(s)	Luis Huerta Poza	Spain	2:46.24	
4	Andrii Drapkin	Ukraine	2:46.52	
5	Muhammad Nur Syaiful Zulkafli	Malaysia	2:52.61	
6	Zy Kher Lee	Malaysia	2:53.12	
7	Phuchit Aingchaiyaphum	Thailand	2:56.33	
8	Zeyad Kahil	Egypt	2:56.95	

-->

=== S14 ===
15 swimmers entered the competition.

The applicable records entering the event were as follows:

Record	Swimmer	Time
World record	Reece Dunn (United Kingdom)	1:52.40
Championships record	Gabriel Bandeira (Brazil)	1:52.42

Heats

Rank	Heat	Lane	Name	Nation	Result	Notes
1	1	5	William Ellard	Great Britain	1:55.06	Q
2	1	4	Nicholas Bennett	Canada	1:55.42	Q
3	2	5	Jack Ireland	Australia	1:56.01	Q
4	1	6	Dmytro Vanzenko	Ukraine	1:57.06	Q
5	2	4	Gabriel Bandeira	Brazil	1:58.03	Q
6	1	3	Wai Lok Tang	Hong Kong	1:58.08	Q
7	2	3	Jordan Catchpole	Great Britain	1:58.32	Q
8	2	2	Alexander Hillhouse	Denmark	1:58.81	Q
9	2	6	Tsun Lok Cheung	Hong Kong	1:58.84	
10	2	1	Anku Matsuda	Japan	2:01.38	
11	1	2	Nader Khalili	Finland	2:01.62	
12	1	1	Louis Lawlor	Great Britain	2:01.79	
13	2	7	Hon Yin Wong	Hong Kong	2:02.15	
14	2	8	Shunya Murakami	Japan	2:03.21	
15	1	7	Inkook Lee	South Korea	2:03.70	

Final

The final took place on 31 July.

Rank	Heat	Lane	Athlete	Nation	Result	Notes
1st place, gold medalist(s)	1	5	Nicholas Bennett	Canada	1:54.75	
2nd place, silver medalist(s)	1	4	William Ellard	Great Britain	1:54.79	
3rd place, bronze medalist(s)	1	3	Jack Ireland	Australia	1:55.38	
4	1	6	Dmytro Vanzenko	Ukraine	1:56.40	
5	1	2	Gabriel Bandeira	Brazil	1:56.90	
6	1	8	Alexander Hillhouse	Denmark	1:57.13	
7	1	1	Jordan Catchpole	Great Britain	1:58.49	
8	1	7	Wai Lok Tang	Hong Kong	2:00.14	
