= Swimming at the 2020 Summer Paralympics – Men's 100 metre backstroke S1 =

Men's 100 metre backstroke S1 at the XVI Paralympic Games
- Venue: Tokyo Aquatics Centre
- Dates: 25 August 2021
- Competitors: 7 from 7 nations

Medalists
1st place, gold medalist(s)		Iyad Shalabi	Israel
2nd place, silver medalist(s)		Anton Kol	Ukraine
3rd place, bronze medalist(s)		Francesco Bettella	Italy

The Men's 100 metre backstroke S1 event at the 2020 Summer Paralympics took place on 25 August 2021 at the Tokyo Aquatics Centre. The event was contested by seven swimmers from seven nations.

The S1 classification is designated for swimmers with the most severe physical impairments affecting their limbs and trunk function. Athletes in this class typically have limited propulsion and coordination in the water.

Because only seven swimmers entered the event, no heats were required and a direct final was held.

== Final ==
No heats were needed, as there were only seven swimmers.

100m backstroke final
Rank	Lane	Name	Nationality	Time	Notes
1st place, gold medalist(s)	4	Iyad Shalabi	Israel	2:28.04	
2nd place, silver medalist(s)	5	Anton Kol	Ukraine	2:28.29	
3rd place, bronze medalist(s)	3	Francesco Bettella	Italy	2:32.08	
4	6	Dimitrios Karypidis	Greece	2:58.07	
5	2	Jose Ronaldo da Silva	Brazil	3:03.18	
6	7	Luis Eduardo Rojas	Colombia	3:39.25	
7	1	Aliaksei Talai	Belarus	4:01.23	
