= Roman Makarov =

Russian Paralympic swimmer

Personal information
- Nationality: Russian
- Born: 19 August 1984 (age 41) Mogilev, Byelorussian SSR, Soviet Union

Sport
- Sport: Paralympic swimming
- Disability class: S12
- Club: Youth of Moscow
- Coached by: Vadim Labokha; Sergey Zhilkin
Medal record
Paralympic swimming
Representing RPC
Paralympic Games
Bronze medal – third place	2020 Tokyo	100 m butterfly S12
Representing Russia
Paralympic Games
Gold medal – first place	2012 London	100 m butterfly S12
World Championships
Gold medal – first place	2010 Eindhoven	100 m butterfly S12
Gold medal – first place	2010 Eindhoven	4×100 m freestyle 49pts
Gold medal – first place	2010 Eindhoven	4×100 m medley 49pts
Gold medal – first place	2013 Monreal	100 m butterfly S12
Silver medal – second place	2015 Glasgow	100 m butterfly S13
Bronze medal – third place	2019 London	100 m backstroke S12
Bronze medal – third place	2019 London	mixed 4x100m freestyle relay 49pts
European Championships
Gold medal – first place	2014 Eindhoven	100 m butterfly S12
Silver medal – second place	2016 Funchal	100 m butterfly S12
Silver medal – second place	2016 Funchal	100 m backstroke S12
Bronze medal – third place	2014 Eindhoven	100 m backstroke S12
Bronze medal – third place	2020 Funchal	100 m backstroke S12

Roman Makarov (born 19 August 1984) is a visually impaired Russian Paralympic swimmer who specializes in the butterfly stroke. He represents Russia in elite international events.

== Career ==
Makarov represented Russia at the 2012 Summer Paralympics in the men's 100 metre butterfly S12 event and won a gold medal.

Makarov represented Russian Paralympic Committee athletes at the 2020 Summer Paralympics in the men's 100 metre butterfly S12 event and won a bronze medal.
