= 2014 IPC Swimming European Championships – Women's 4 × 50 metre medley relay =

The Women's 50 metre x 4 medley at the 2014 IPC Swimming European Championships was held at the Pieter van den Hoogenband Swimming Stadium, in Eindhoven from 4–10 August.

As with other disability medley events, the freestyle works on a points system whereby the classification numbers of each swimmer are totaled to give a number no higher than 20.

== Medalists ==
Event	Gold		Silver		Bronze	
20pts	Yelyzaveta Mereshko (S6); Viktoriia Savtsova (SB5); Oksana Khrul (S6); Olga Sviderska (S3); Ukraine	3:02:12	Sara Josefine Hanssen (S6); Ingrid Djupskas (SB7); Sarah Louise Rung (S5); Ingrid Thunem (S1); Norway	3:16.59	Zsanett Adámi (S7); Gitta Ráczkó (SB4); Réka Kézdi (S5); Fanni Illés (S4); Hungary	3:16.87

== See also ==
- List of IPC world records in swimming
