= Swimming at the 2016 Summer Paralympics – Men's 100 metre backstroke S12 =

Men's 100 metre backstroke S12 at the XV Paralympic Games
- Venue: Olympic Aquatics Stadium
- Dates: 14 September 2016
- Competitors: 12 from 10 nations

Medalists
| 1st place, gold medalist(s) | | Sergii Klippert | Ukraine |
| 2nd place, silver medalist(s) | | Raman Salei | Azerbaijan |
| 3rd place, bronze medalist(s) | | Tucker Dupree | United States |

The Men's 100 metre backstroke S12 event at the 2016 Paralympic Games took place on 14 September 2016, at the Olympic Aquatics Stadium. Two heats were held. The swimmers with the eight fastest times advanced to the final.

== Heats ==
=== Heat 1 ===
10:09 14 September 2016:

| Rank | Lane | Name | Nationality | Time | Notes |
|---|---|---|---|---|---|
| 1 | 5 | Raman Salei | Azerbaijan | 1:01.58 | Q |
| 2 | 4 | Sergii Klippert | Ukraine | 1:01.72 | Q |
| 3 | 3 | Dzmitry Salei | Azerbaijan | 1:02.63 | Q |
| 4 | 2 | Anuar Akhmetov | Kazakhstan | 1:08.28 | Q |
| 5 | 6 | Fabrizio Sottile | Italy | 1:08.93 | |
| 6 | 7 | Diego Fernando Cuesta Martinez | Colombia | 1:10.02 | |

=== Heat 2 ===
10:13 14 September 2016:

| Rank | Lane | Name | Nationality | Time | Notes |
|---|---|---|---|---|---|
| 1 | 4 | Tucker Dupree | United States | 1:01.61 | Q |
| 2 | 3 | Stephen Clegg | Great Britain | 1:03.11 | Q |
| 3 | 5 | Charalampos Taiganidis | Greece | 1:03.70 | Q |
| 4 | 6 | Thomaz Matera | Brazil | 1:04.19 | Q |
| 5 | 2 | Daniel Giraldo Correa | Colombia | 1:08.37 | |
| 6 | 7 | Samuel Ciorap | Romania | 1:09.30 | |

== Final ==
18:34 14 September 2016:

| Rank | Lane | Name | Nationality | Time | Notes |
|---|---|---|---|---|---|
| 1st place, gold medalist(s) | 3 | Sergii Klippert | Ukraine | 59.77 | |
| 2nd place, silver medalist(s) | 4 | Raman Salei | Azerbaijan | 1:00.91 | |
| 3rd place, bronze medalist(s) | 5 | Tucker Dupree | United States | 1:01.04 | |
| 4 | 7 | Charalampos Taiganidis | Greece | 1:01.21 | |
| 5 | 2 | Stephen Clegg | Great Britain | 1:02.06 | |
| 6 | 6 | Dzmitry Salei | Azerbaijan | 1:02.70 | |
| 7 | 1 | Thomaz Matera | Brazil | 1:04.33 | |
| 8 | 8 | Anuar Akhmetov | Kazakhstan | 1:09.11 | |
