= Francesco Bettella =

Italian Paralympic swimmer (born 1989)

Personal information
- Born: 23 March 1989 (age 37) Padua, Italy

Sport
- Country: Italy
- Sport: Paralympic swimming
Medal record
Paralympic Games
Silver medal – second place	2016 Rio de Janeiro	50 m backstroke S1
Silver medal – second place	2016 Rio de Janeiro	100 m backstroke S1
Silver medal – second place	2024 Paris	50 m backstroke S1
Bronze medal – third place	2020 Tokyo	50 m backstroke S1
Bronze medal – third place	2020 Tokyo	100 m backstroke S1
Bronze medal – third place	2024 Paris	100 m backstroke S1
World Championships
Gold medal – first place	2022 Madeira	200 m freestyle S1
Silver medal – second place	2022 Madeira	100 m backstroke S1
Silver medal – second place	2023 Manchester	200 m freestyle S1
Silver medal – second place	2025 Singapore	100 m backstroke S1
Bronze medal – third place	2010 Eindhoven	200 m freestyle S2
Bronze medal – third place	2023 Manchester	50 m backstroke S1
Bronze medal – third place	2025 Singapore	200 m freestyle S1
European Championships
Gold medal – first place	2026 Kocaeli	50 m backstroke S1
Silver medal – second place	2026 Kocaeli	100 m backstroke S1
Bronze medal – third place	2018 Dublin	50 m backstroke S2

Francesco Bettella (born 23 March 1989) is an Italian Paralympic swimmer. He represented Italy at the Summer Paralympics in 2012, 2016, 2020 and 2024.

== Career ==
In 2016, he won two medals: the silver medal both in the men's 50 metre backstroke S1 event and in the men's 100 metre backstroke S1 event. He won two bronze medals at the 2020 Summer Paralympics.

He won the bronze medal in the men's 50 metres backstroke S2 at the 2018 World Para Swimming European Championships held in Dublin, Ireland.
