= Iuliia Shishova =

Russian Paralympic swimmer

Personal information
- Born: 30 March 1997 (age 29) Saratov, Russia

Sport
- Sport: Paralympic swimming
- Disability class: S3
- Coached by: Galina Filippova
Medal record
Paralympic swimming
Paralympic Games
Bronze medal – third place	2020 Tokyo	50m backstroke S3
Bronze medal – third place	2020 Tokyo	100m freestyle S3
European Championships
Gold medal – first place	2020 Funchal	50m backstroke S3
Representing Russia
European Championships
Silver medal – second place	2014 Eindhoven	50m breaststroke SB2
Silver medal – second place	2016 Funchal	50m backstroke S3
Bronze medal – third place	2014 Eindhoven	4x50m freestyle relay 20pts
Bronze medal – third place	2016 Funchal	100m freestyle S3

Iuliia Shishova (born 30 March 1997) is a Russian Paralympic swimmer. She won bronze in the Women's 50m backstroke S3 in 2020. She has also won five medals in the World Para Swimming European Championships.
