= Anton Kol =

Ukrainian Paralympic swimmer (born 1990)

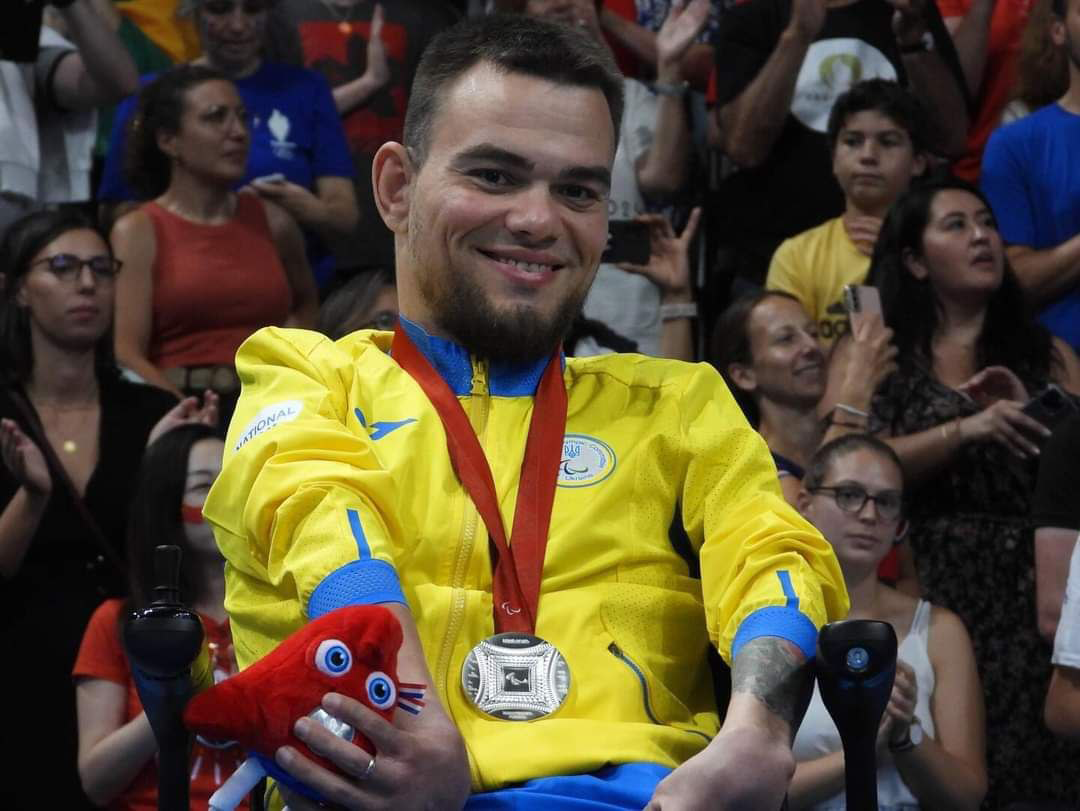
- Kol at the 2024 Summer Paralympics

Personal information
- Born: 1 June 1990 (age 36)

Sport
- Country: Ukraine
- Sport: Paralympic swimming
- Disability: Arthrogryposis
- Disability class: S1
Medal record
Paralympic Games
Silver medal – second place	2020 Tokyo	50 metre backstroke S1
Silver medal – second place	2020 Tokyo	100 metre backstroke S1
Silver medal – second place	2024 Paris	100 m backstroke S1
Bronze medal – third place	2016 Rio de Janeiro	50 metre backstroke S1
Bronze medal – third place	2016 Rio de Janeiro	100 metre backstroke S1
Bronze medal – third place	2024 Paris	50 m backstroke S1
World Championships
Gold medal – first place	2022 Madeira	100 m backstroke S1
Gold medal – first place	2022 Madeira	50 m backstroke S1
Gold medal – first place	2023 Manchester	200 m freestyle S1
Gold medal – first place	2025 Singapore	100 m backstroke S1
Gold medal – first place	2025 Singapore	200 m freestyle S1
Bronze medal – third place	2025 Singapore	50 m backstroke S1
European Championships
Gold medal – first place	2024 Madeira	100 m backstroke S1
Gold medal – first place	2026 Kocaeli	100 m backstroke S1
Silver medal – second place	2024 Madeira	50 m backstroke S1
Silver medal – second place	2026 Kocaeli	50 m backstroke S1

Anton Kol (Ukrainian: Антон Миколайович Коль; born 1 June 1990) is a Ukrainian Paralympic swimmer competing in S1-classification events. He won two silver medals at the 2020 Summer Paralympics held in Tokyo, Japan. He also represented Ukraine at the 2016 Summer Paralympics held in Rio de Janeiro, Brazil and he won the bronze medals in the men's 50 metre backstroke S1 and men's 100 metre backstroke S1 events.

== Career ==
At the 2013 IPC Swimming World Championships he won the silver medal in the men's 50 metre backstroke S1 event and the bronze medal in the men's 100 metre freestyle S1 event.

At the 2014 IPC Swimming European Championships he won the bronze medal in the men's 100 metre freestyle S1 event, the bronze medal in the men's 50 metre freestyle S1 event and the silver medal in the men's 50 metre backstroke S1 event.

At the 2015 IPC Swimming World Championships he won the silver medal in the men's 50 metre backstroke S1 event and also the silver medal in the men's 100 metre backstroke S1 event.

He won the bronze medal in the men's 100 metres backstroke S2 event at the 2018 World Para Swimming European Championships held in Dublin, Ireland. He also finished in 4th place in the men's 50 metres backstroke S2 competition.

At the 2025 World Para Swimming Championships in Singapore, Kol won two world titles—taking gold in the men's 100 m backstroke S1 on 23 September and the men's 200 m freestyle S1 on 24 September—before adding bronze in the men's 50 m backstroke S1 on 26 September.
