= Raman Salei =

Azerbaijani swimmer (born 1994)

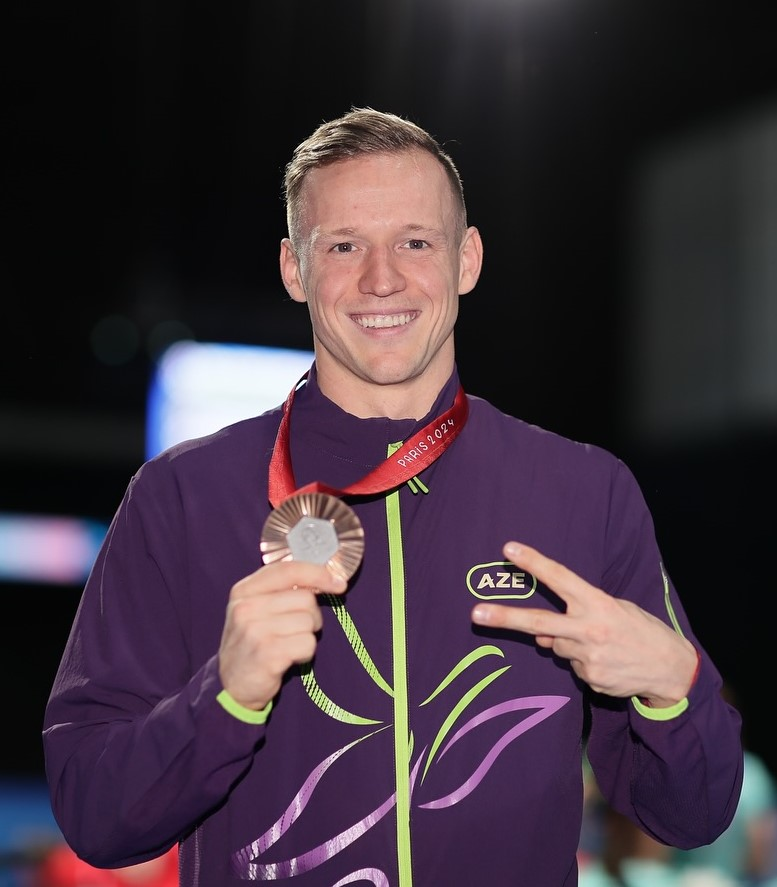
- Salei at the 2024 Summer Paralympics

Personal information
- Full name: Raman Sergeevich Salei
- Nationality: Belarusian
- Citizenship: Azerbaijan
- Born: February 27, 1994 (age 32)

Sport
- Country: Azerbaijan
- Sport: Swimming
Medal record
Men's swimming
Representing Azerbaijan
Paralympic Games
| Gold medal – first place | 2020 Tokyo | 100 m freestyle S12 |
| Gold medal – first place | 2020 Tokyo | 100 m backstroke S12 |
| Gold medal – first place | 2020 Tokyo | 100 m butterfly S12 |
| Silver medal – second place | 2016 Rio de Janeiro | 100 m backstroke S12 |
| Silver medal – second place | 2024 Paris | 100 m backstroke S12 |
| Bronze medal – third place | 2024 Paris | 100 m freestyle S12 |
| Bronze medal – third place | 2024 Paris | 100 m butterfly S12 |
World Championships
| Gold medal – first place | 2022 Madeira | 50 m freestyle S12 |
| Gold medal – first place | 2022 Madeira | 100 m freestyle S12 |
| Gold medal – first place | 2023 Manchester | 100 m freestyle S12 |
| Gold medal – first place | 2025 Singapore | 100 m backstroke S12 |
| Silver medal – second place | 2015 Glasgow | 50 m freestyle S12 |
| Silver medal – second place | 2019 London | 100 m backstroke S12 |
| Silver medal – second place | 2022 Madeira | 100 m butterfly S12 |
| Silver medal – second place | 2023 Manchester | 100 m backstroke S12 |
| Silver medal – second place | 2025 Singapore | 50 m freestyle S12 |
| Bronze medal – third place | 2019 London | 50 m freestyle S12 |
| Bronze medal – third place | 2019 London | 100 m freestyle S12 |
| Bronze medal – third place | 2023 Manchester | 100 m butterfly S12 |
| Bronze medal – third place | 2023 Manchester | 50 m freestyle S12 |
| Bronze medal – third place | 2025 Singapore | 100 m butterfly S12 |
| Bronze medal – third place | 2025 Singapore | 100 m freestyle S12 |
European Championships
| Gold medal – first place | 2020 Funchal | 100 m freestyle S12 |
| Gold medal – first place | 2020 Funchal | 100 m backstroke S12 |
| Silver medal – second place | 2020 Funchal | 100 m butterfly S12 |

Raman Sergeevich Salei (Azerbaijani: Raman Sergeyeviç Salei; born February 27, 1994) is an Azerbaijani paralympic-swimmer of Belarusian origin. He represented Azerbaijan at the 2016 Summer Paralympic Games in Rio de Janeiro and the 2020 Summer Paralympic Games in Tokyo, winning three gold medals and one silver.

== Biography ==
Roman Salei was born on February 27, 1994. In 2013, Salei's elder brother, Dzmitry Salei, decided to compete for Azerbaijan and Salei agreed to join him.

=== 2015 World Championship and 2016 Paralympics ===
At the 2015 IPC Swimming World Championships in Glasgow, Scotland, Salei won the silver medal in the men's 50 m freestyle S12. The following year, at the 2016 Paralympic Games in Rio de Janeiro, Salei took silver in the 100 m backstroke S12. In recognition of his performance at the games, and for his contribution to the development of Azerbaijani sport, Salei was awarded the Order "For Service to the Fatherland" III degree by the President of Azerbaijan, Ilham Aliyev.

=== 2019 World Championship and 2021 Paralympics ===
At the 2019 World Para Swimming Championships, Salei won silver in the 100 m backstroke S12 and bronze in the 50 m freestyle S12 and 100 m freestyle S12. He improved on this performance at the 2020 Summer Paralympics in Tokyo, winning gold in both the 100 metre freestyle S12 and 100 metre backstroke S12 events.

=== 2024 Paralympics ===
Salei represented Azerbaijan at the 2024 Summer Paralympics held in Paris. He competed in the men's 100-meter backstroke in the S12 category, winning the silver medal with a time of 1:00.67. In the 100-meter freestyle event in the S12 category, he earned the bronze medal with a time of 53.65.

By the decree of President Ilham Aliyev on September 10, 2024, Raman Salei was awarded 150,000 manats for securing second and third places at the XVII Summer Paralympics, while his coach was awarded 75,000 manats. In another decree issued on the same day, he was also honored with the 2nd-degree For Service to the Fatherland Order.
