= 2018 World Para Swimming European Championships – Men's 50 metres backstroke =

The men's 50 metres backstroke at the 2018 World Para Swimming European Championships was held at the National Aquatic Centre in Dublin from 13 to 19 August. 4 classification finals are held in all over this event.

== Medalists ==
Event	Gold		Silver		Bronze	
S2	Aristeidis Makrodimitris (GRE)	1:05.07	Jacek Czech (POL)	1:05.22	Francesco Bettella (ITA)	1:10.53
S3	Vincenzo Boni (ITA)	48.78	Denys Ostapchenko (UKR)	52.17	Miguel Anguel Martinez Tajuelo (ESP)	52.49
S4	Arnost Petracek (CZE)	44.87	Matz Topkin (EST)	45.46	Dmytro Vynohradets (UKR)	49.30
S5	Yaroslav Semenenko (UKR)	34.95	Antonio Fantin (ITA)	36.17	Andrew Mullen (GBR)	36.39
WR world record | AR area record | CR championship record | GR games record | NR national record | OR Olympic record | PB personal best | SB season best | WL world leading (in a given season)

== See also ==
- List of IPC world records in swimming
