= Maksim Vashkevich =

Belarusian para swimmer (born 1999)

Personal information
- Nationality: Belarusian
- Born: 31 August 1999 (age 26)

Sport
- Sport: Para swimming
- Disability class: S12
Medal record
Men's para swimming
Representing Neutral Paralympic Athletes
World Championships
| Silver medal – second place | 2025 Singapore | 100 m backstroke S12 |
European Championships
| Gold medal – first place | 2024 Funchal | 100 m backstroke S12 |
Representing Belarus
European Championships
| Silver medal – second place | 2020 Funchal | 100 m backstroke S12 |

Maksim Vashkevich (born 31 August 1999) is a Belarusian para swimmer. He competed at the 2020 and 2024 Summer Paralympics.

== Career ==
Vashkevich represented Neutral Paralympic Athletes at the 2024 Summer Paralympics and finished in fourth place in the 100 metre backstroke S12 event. He then represented Neutral Paralympic Athletes at the 2025 World Para Swimming Championships and won a silver medal in the 100 metre backstroke S12 event.
