= Youth of Moscow =

Youth of Moscow (Russian: Юность Москвы) is a sports association of youth sports schools in Moscow.

== History ==
The association includes 40 sports schools, where 639 coaches train 19,685 students. Among the coaching staff, 100 hold the title of Honored Coach of Russia. Among the athletes: 1,094 have achieved the first sports category, 7,820 hold mass sports categories, 640 are Candidates for Master of Sport, 344 are Masters of Sport, 88 are International Masters of Sport, and 27 are Honoured Master of Sport of Russia.

Over its long history the school has trained many Olympic champions of the USSR and Russia, including synchronized swimmers Anastasia Davydova and Anastasiya Yermakova, gymnasts Tatyana Gorbunova and Daria Shkurikhina, fencers Mikhail Burtsev and Viktoria Nikishina.

The association was established as the "Children and Youth Sports School No. 66 of the Committee for Physical Culture and Sports of the Government of Moscow" on September 12, 1969, by decision of the Kalininsky District Council of People's Deputies of Moscow. After 1993, it underwent multiple renamings, and since June 16, 2006, it has been known as the "Specialized Children and Youth Sports School of Olympic Reserve Yunost Moskvy". In 2013, at the national sports awards ceremony, "Yunost Moskvy" was recognized as the best sports school in Russia.
