= Honoured Master of Sport of Belarus =

== Belarus ==
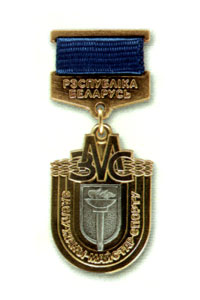
Breast badge of "Honoured Master of Sport of the Republic of Belarus" (2005 version)

The title of "Honoured Master of Sport of the Republic of Belarus" (Belarusian: Заслужаны майстар спорту Рэспублікi Беларусь) is an honorary title conferred by decree of the President of the Republic of Belarus.

The title was established in 1994 as an honorary sports distinction. Under the Law of the Republic of Belarus dated 13 April 1995 "On State Awards of the Republic of Belarus", it was formally recognized as an honorary title. The subsequent law, enacted on 18 May 2004, states:

The honorary title "Honored Master of Sports of the Republic of Belarus" is awarded to athletes, including athletes with disabilities, for achieving high results at the Olympic Games, Paralympic Games, and World Games, championships, world and European championships, and World and European Cups.

— Law of the Republic of Belarus (lawbelarus.com)

On 12 April 1996, individuals who had been awarded the title "Honoured Master of Sport of the USSR" were granted equal status with those awarded the title "Honoured Master of Sport of the Republic of Belarus." (In 1994–1995, several Honoured Masters of Sport of the USSR were also formally awarded the Belarusian title.)

The official description of the badge was approved on 15 January 1996, and a new version was adopted on 8 April 2005, in which the inscriptions were changed from Russian to Belarusian.

There are no clearly defined criteria for the award of the title. Olympic champions and medalists are generally granted the title. In 2002, all members of the national hockey team that placed fourth at the Winter Olympics were also awarded the title. At the Paralympic Games, the title is usually awarded to champions.
