= Honored Master of Sports of Russia =

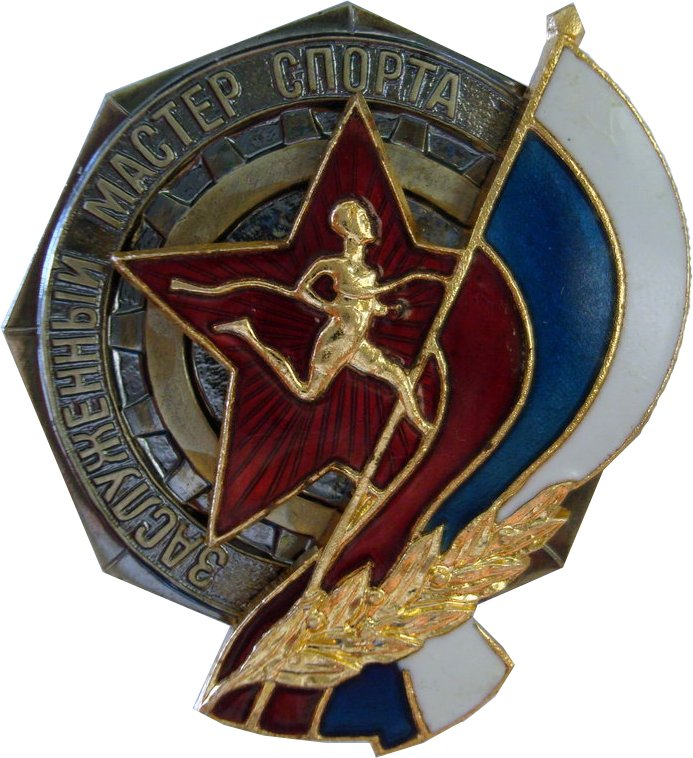
Badge awarded before 2007

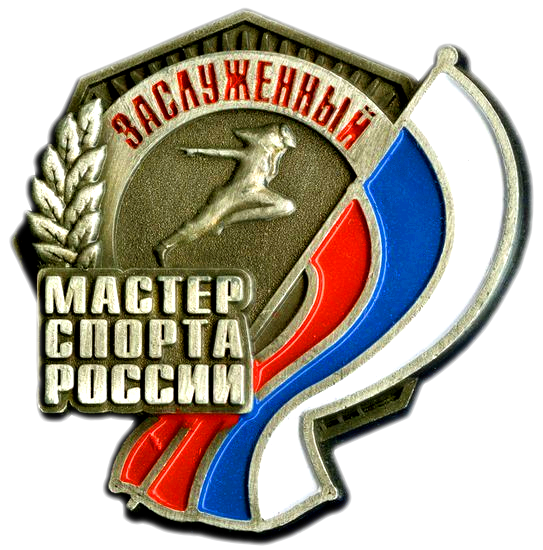
Badge awarded since 2007

The title of "Honoured Master of Sport of Russia" (Russian: Заслуженный мастер спорта России) is an honorary sports title established in 1992.

The latest version of the regulations governing this title was adopted in 2008, with minor amendments to the 2006 order. Decisions on awarding or revoking the title are made by the highest governing body for physical culture and sports in the Russian Federation.

According to current regulations, the title may be awarded to:

Champions and medalists of the Olympic Games, Paralympic Games, and Deaflympics;

World champions in events included in the programs of the Olympic, Paralympic, and Deaflympic Games — in individual events, including relays, groups, pairs, etc., as well as in team sports;

World and European champions, and winners of World and European Cups, who have also accumulated the required number of points in accordance with a special scoring table;

"By way of exception" — "for outstanding contributions to enhancing the prestige of the Russian Federation and Russian sport at the international level, demonstrated through exceptional courage and skill." Although the title of "Honoured Master of Sport of Russia" is awarded to Russian citizens, an exception was made in 2008: following Zenit's victory in the 2007–08 UEFA Cup, team captain Anatoliy Tymoshchuk was awarded the title, despite not holding Russian citizenship. Tymoshchuk is a citizen of Ukraine and had already been awarded the title of "Honoured Master of Sport of Ukraine" in 2005. Other foreign players from Zenit did not receive the Russian title.
