= Hennadii Boiko =

Ukrainian Paralympic swimmer

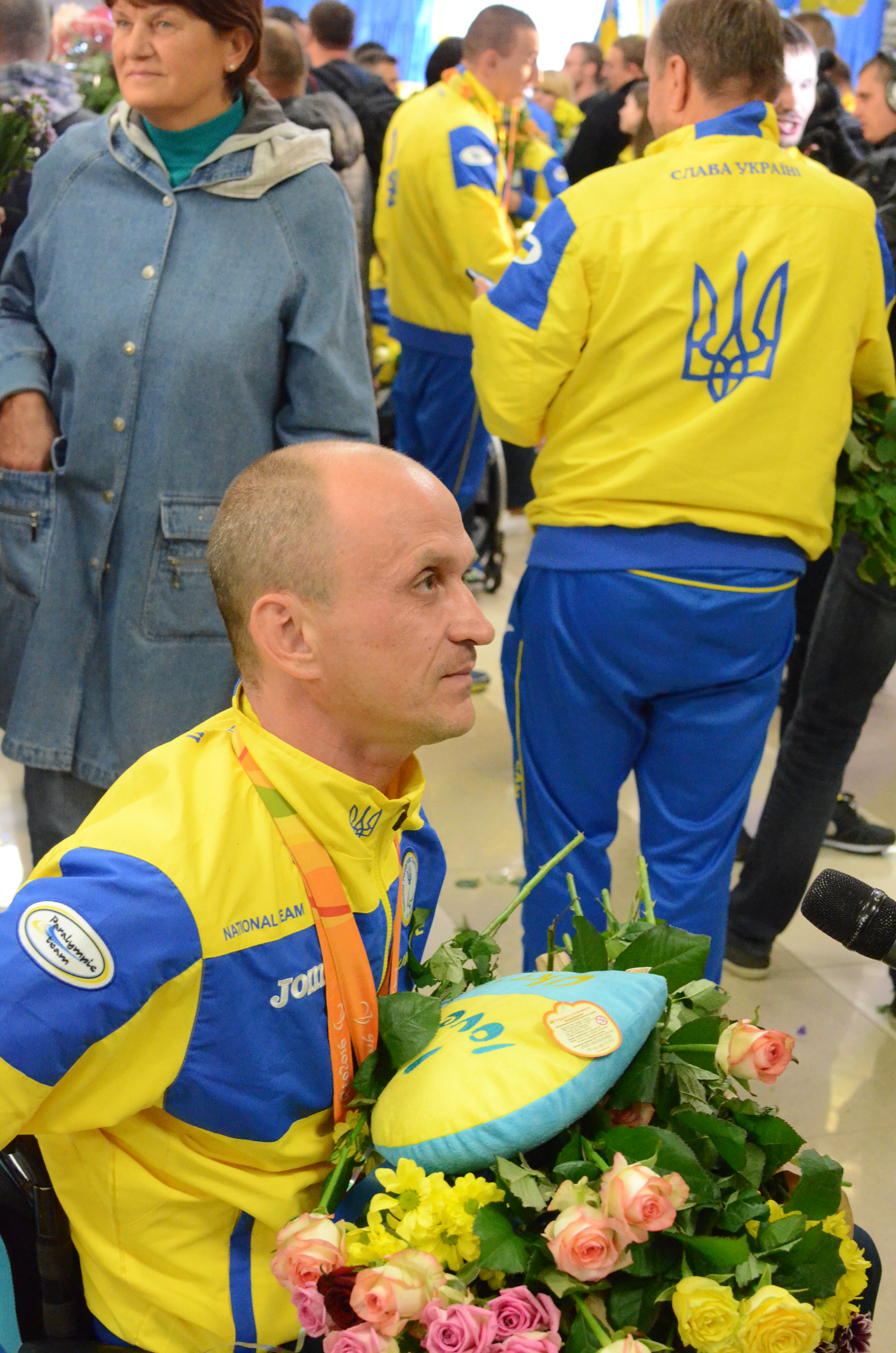

Personal information
- Full name: Hennadii Boiko (Ukrainian: Геннадій Романович Бойко)
- Nationality: Ukrainian
- Born: 3 March 1974 (age 52) Mykolaiv, Ukraine

Sport
- Sport: Swimming
- Strokes: backstroke
- Club: Invasport, Mykolaiv
- Coach: Mykola Iljin, Tamara Iljina
Medal record
Representing Ukraine
Paralympic Games
Gold medal – first place	2012 London	50m backstroke S1
Gold medal – first place	2016 Rio de Janeiro	50m backstroke S1
Gold medal – first place	2016 Rio de Janeiro	100m backstroke S1

Hennadii Boiko (Ukrainian: Геннадій Романович Бойко; born 3 March 1974) is a Paralympic swimmer from Ukraine competing mainly in category S1 events at the 2012 and 2016 Summer Paralympics.
