= S1 (classification) =

Para-swimming classification

S1, SB1, SM1 are Para swimming classifications used for categorising swimmers based on their level of disability. The classifications cover athletes with "very severe coordination problems in four limbs or have no use of their legs, trunk, hands and minimal use of their shoulders only". Swimmers in this class have a variety of different disabilities including cerebral palsy.

Swimming events available for people in this class include the 50m and 100m Freestyle, 200m Freestyle, 50m Backstroke, 50m Butterfly, 50m Breaststroke and 150m Individual Medley events.

== Definition ==
Visualisation of functional mobility for a S1 competitor

This classification is for swimming. In the classification title, S represents Freestyle, Backstroke and Butterfly strokes. SB means breaststroke. SM means individual medley. Swimming classifications are on a gradient, with one being the most severely physically impaired to ten having the least amount of physical disability. Jane Buckley, writing for the Sporting Wheelies, describes the swimmers in this classification as having: "with very severe coordination problems in four limbs or have no use of their legs, trunk, hands and minimal use of their shoulders only. These swimmers usually only swim on their back. Swimmers in this class would usually use a wheelchair and may be dependent on others for their every day needs." The Yass Tribune defined this classification in 2007 as "athlete’s with a minimal range of movement and muscular tone". Swimmers in this classification typically use a wheelchair, swim on their backs, have almost no use of their legs and limited use of their upper body.

== Disability groups ==
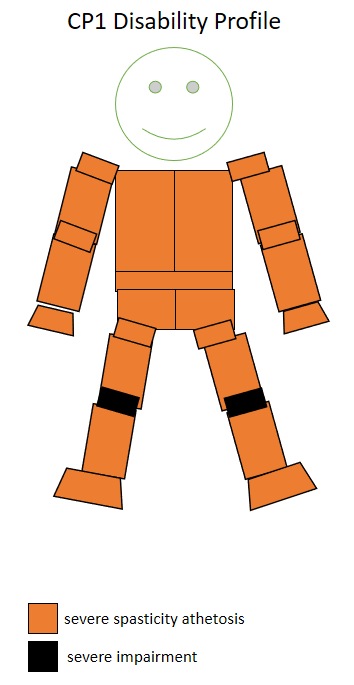
The spasticity athetosis level and location of a CP1 sportsperson.

=== Cerebral palsy ===
One of the disability groups in this classification is swimmers with cerebral palsy, including CP1 classified swimmers.

Some CP1 swimmers in this class require floaters to race. The use of such devices is not allowed in IPC sanctioned events, but is allowed in CP-ISRA sanctioned ones. CP1 swimmers tend to have a passive normalized drag in the range of 1.3 to 1.7. This puts them into the passive drag band of PDB1, and PDB3. CP1 sportspeople tend to use electric wheelchairs. They may have controlled shakes and twitches. They have severely limited use of their trunk and limbs. When participating in sport, CP1 competitors tend to have low energy expenditure. This bodily activity can spike their metabolic rate.

=== Spinal cord injuries ===
People with spinal cord injuries compete in this class, including F1 and F2 sportspeople.

==== F1 ====
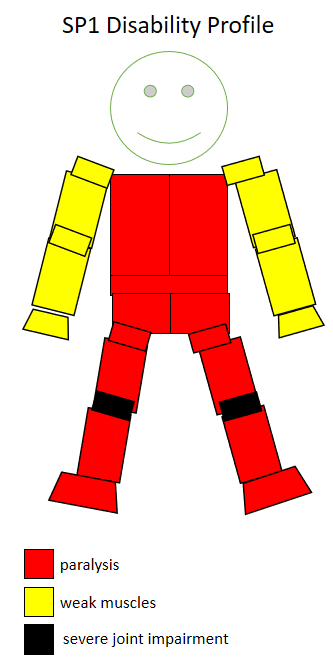
Functional profile of a wheelchair sportsperson in the F1 class.

This is wheelchair sport classification that corresponds to the neurological level C6. In the past, this class was known as 1A Complete. Disabled Sports USA defined the anatomical definition of this class in 2003 as, "Have functional elbow flexors and wrist dorsi-flexors. May have elbow extensors (up to power 3) but usually do not have wrist palmar flexors. May have shoulder weakness. Have no sitting balance." People with C4 lesions have head control, and limited respiratory endurance. People with C5 lesions have abduction of the arms, and flexion of the arm. People with C6 lesions have abduction and flexion of the arms, and wrist extension.

The location of lesions on different vertebrae tend to be associated with disability levels and functionality issues. People with C4 lesions can control electronic devices using a mouth controlled joystick. People with a lesion at C5 or C6 have an impairment that effects the use of their hands and lower arm. People with C5 can perform some actions with one of their arms, and can propel a wheelchair with modified rims that make it easier to do. People with C6 can have a weak grasp with their wrist. They can roll over in bed. They have some independence in that they can eat and groom themselves without assistance. They may also be able to transfer themselves to a wheelchair. In terms of motor functions, people in this class who are C4-C6 tetraplegics may have issues with their biceps, deltoids, rhomboids and rotator cuffs. They may have an absence of sensation in their hands, wrists and forearms. People in this class have a total respiratory capacity of 81% compared to people without a disability. The functional characteristics for this class at the 1990 Stoke Mandeville Games had this class scoring a 0 - 3 for triceps on the MRC scale, with severe weakness of the trunk and lower limbs.

People with spinal cord injuries in S1 tend to be tetraplegics with complete lesions below C5. These S1 swimmers have no hand or wrist flexion so are unable to catch water. Because of a lack of trunk control, they are unstable in the water and have hip drag. As they have no leg and back control, their legs are normally drag in the water in a flexed position. They normally swim the backstroke using a double arm technique. They start in the water with assistance for initial propulsion.

For swimming with the most severe disabilities at the 1984 Summer Paralympics, floating devices and a swimming coach in the water swimming next to the Paralympic competitor were allowed. A study of was done comparing the performance of athletics competitors at the 1984 Summer Paralympics. It found there was little significant difference in performance times between women in 1A (SP1, SP2), 1B (SP3), and 1C (SP3, SP4) in the 25m breaststroke. It found there was little significant difference in performance times between women in 1A (SP1, SP2), 1B (SP3), and 1C (SP3, SP4) in the 25m backstroke. It found there was little significant difference in performance times between women in 1A (SP1, SP2), 1B (SP3), and 1C (SP3, SP4) in the 25m freestyle. It found there was little significant difference in performance times between men in 1A (SP1, SP2), 1B (SP3), and 1C (SP3, SP4) in the 25m backstroke. It found there was little significant difference in performance times between men in 1A (SP1, SP2), 1B (SP3), and 1C (SP3, SP4) in the 25m freestyle. It found there was little significant difference in performance times between men in 1A (SP1, SP2), and 1B (SP3) in the 25m breaststroke.

==== F2 ====
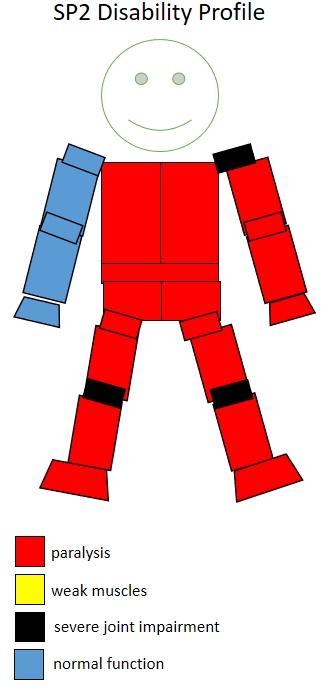
Functional profile of a wheelchair sportsperson in the F2 class.

This is wheelchair sport classification that corresponds to the neurological level C7. In the past, this class was known as 1B Complete, 1A Incomplete. The location of lesions on different vertebrae tend to be associated with disability levels and functionality issues. C7 is associated with elbow flexors. C8 is associated with finger flexors. Disabled Sports USA defined the anatomical definition of this class in 2003 as, ""Have functional elbow flexors and extensors, wrist dorsi-flexors and palmar flexors. Have good shoulder muscle function. May have some finger flexion and extension but not functional." People with lesions at C7 have stabilization and extension of the elbow and some extension of the wrist. People with a lesion at C7 have an impairment that effects the use of their hands and lower arm. They can use a wheelchair using their own power, and do everyday tasks like eating, dressing, and normal physical maintenance. People in this class have a total respiratory capacity of 79% compared to people without a disability.

Swimming classification is done based on a total points system, with a variety of functional and medical tests being used as part of a formula to assign a class. Part of this test involves the Adapted Medical Research Council (MRC) scale. For upper trunk extension, C8 complete are given 0 points.

When classified S1, these swimmers have no hand or wrist flexion so are unable to catch water. Because of a lack of trunk control, they are unstable in the water and have hip drag. As they have no leg and back control, their legs are normally drag in the water in a flexed position. They normally swim the backstroke using a double arm technique. They start in the water with assistance for initial propulsion.

For swimming with the most severe disabilities at the 1984 Summer Paralympics, floating devices and a swimming coach in the water swimming next to the Paralympic competitor were allowed. A study of was done comparing the performance of athletics competitors at the 1984 Summer Paralympics. It found there was little significant difference in performance times between women in 1A (SP1, SP2), 1B (SP3), and 1C (SP3, SP4) in the 25m breaststroke. It found there was little significant difference in performance times between women in 1A (SP1, SP2), 1B (SP3), and 1C (SP3, SP4) in the 25m backstroke. It found there was little significant difference in performance times between women in 1A (SP1, SP2), 1B (SP3), and 1C (SP3, SP4) in the 25m freestyle. It found there was little significant difference in performance times between men in 1A (SP1, SP2), 1B (SP3), and 1C (SP3, SP4) in the 25m backstroke. It found there was little significant difference in performance times between men in 1A (SP1, SP2), 1B (SP3), and 1C (SP3, SP4) in the 25m freestyle. It found there was little significant difference in performance times between men in 1A (SP1, SP2), and 1B (SP3) in the 25m breaststroke.

== History ==
The classification was created by the International Paralympic Committee. In 2003 the committee approved a plan which recommended the development of a universal classification code. The code was approved in 2007, and defines the "objective of classification as developing and implementing accurate, reliable and consistent sport focused classification systems", which are known as "evidence based, sport specific classification". In November 2015, they approved the revised classification code, which "aims to further develop evidence based, sport specific classification in all sports".

== Events ==
There are a number of events that are available for swimmers in this class. They include the 50m and 100m Freestyle, 200m Freestyle, 50m Backstroke, 50m Butterfly, 50m Breaststroke and 150m Individual Medley events.

== At the Paralympic Games ==
For this classification, organisers of the Paralympic Games have the option of including the following events on the Paralympic programme: 50m and 100m Freestyle, 200m Freestyle, 50m Backstroke, 50m Butterfly, 50m Breaststroke and 150m Individual Medley events.

For the 2016 Summer Paralympics in Rio, the International Paralympic Committee had a zero classification at the Games policy. This policy was put into place in 2014, with the goal of avoiding last minute changes in classes that would negatively impact athlete training preparations. All competitors needed to be internationally classified with their classification status confirmed prior to the Games, with exceptions to this policy being dealt with on a case-by-case basis.

== Records ==
In the S1 50 m Freestyle Long Course, the men's world record is held by Itzhak Mamistvalov (Israel) with a time of 01:04.57 and the women's world record is held by Ganna Ielisavetska (Ukraine) with a time of 01:11.73 in 2009. In the S1 100 m Freestyle Long Course, the men's world record is also held by Itzhak Mamistvalov and the women's world record is held by Iryna Sotska (Ukraine).

== Competitors ==
US American swimmers who have been classified by the United States Paralympic Committee as being in this class include Grover Evans, Jennifer Johnson, Rick Keeton and Breanna Marguerite Sprenger. Other swimmers from this class include Alex Taxildaris, Andreas Katsaros, Apostolos Tsaousi and Christos Tampaxis from Greece, Anton Kol, Hennadii Boiko and Oleksandr Golovko from Ukraine, Itzhak Mamistvalov from Israel, Luis Eduardo Rojas Osorno from Columbia and Sarah Lapp from Canada.

== Getting classified ==
Swimming classification tests for S1 swimmers generally have three components. The first is a bench press. The second is water test. The third is in competition observation. As part of the water test, swimmers are often required to demonstrate their swimming technique for all four strokes. They usually swim a distance of 25 meters for each stroke. They are also generally required to demonstrate how they enter the water and how they turn in the pool.

In Australia, to be classified in this category, athletes contact the Australian Paralympic Committee or their state swimming governing body. In the United States, classification is handled by the United States Paralympic Committee on a national level. The classification test has three components: "a bench test, a water test, observation during competition." American swimmers are assessed by four people: a medical classified, two general classified and a technical classifier.
