= Dimitrios Karypidis =

Greek paralympic swimmer

Sport
- Country: Greece
- Sport: Swimming
Medal record
Representing Greece
World Championships
Silver medal – second place	2017 Mexico City	50 m backstroke S1
Silver medal – second place	2017 Mexico City	100 m backstroke S1
Silver medal – second place	2022 Madeira	200 m freestyle S1
Bronze medal – third place	2022 Madeira	50 m backstroke S1
European Championships
Bronze medal – third place	2026 Kocaeli	100 m backstroke S1
Bronze medal – third place	2026 Kocaeli	50 m backstroke S1

Dimitrios Karypidis is a Greek paralympic swimmer. He took the fourth place in the event of 100m backstroke (S1) twice: at the 2020 Paralympics, in Tokyo and at the 2024 Paralympics, in Paris.

== Career ==
Karypidis Competed at the 2017 World Championships, winning two silver medals in backstroke events. Karypidis also competed at the 2016 and 2020 Summer Paralympics, but without winning a medal.
