= 2014 IPC Swimming European Championships – Men's 100 metre freestyle =

The men's 100 metre freestyle at the 2014 IPC Swimming European Championships was held at the Pieter van den Hoogenband Swimming Stadium in Eindhoven from 4–10 August.

== Medalists ==
Event	Gold		Silver		Bronze	
S1	Hennadii Boiko; Ukraine	2:24.59	Itzhak Mamistvalov; Israel	2:30.96	Anton Kol; Ukraine	2:41.96
S2	Serhii Palamarchuk; Ukraine	2:04.57 ER	Dmitrii Kokarev; Russia	2:06.42	Aristeidis Makrodimitris; Greece	2:08.68
S3	Dmytro Vynohradets; Ukraine	1:46.11	Miguel Ángel Martínez; Spain	1:52.96	Ioannis Kostakis; Greece	1:59.44
S4	Andrii Derevinskyi; Ukraine	1:28.36	David Smétanine; France	1:28.68	Richard Oribe; Spain	1:29.57
S5	Sebastián Rodríguez; Spain	1:17.05	Andrew Mullen; Great Britain	1:18.44	James Scully; Ireland	1.22.40
S6	Sascha Kindred; Great Britain	1:09.83	Sebastian Iwanow; Germany	1:10.16	Georgios Sfaltos; Greece	1:13.68
S7	Yevheniy Bohodayko; Ukraine	1:02.37	Matthew Walker; Great Britain	1:03.33	Andrey Gladkov; Russia	1:04.19
S8	Denis Tarasov; Russia	56.27 WR	Konstantin Lisenkov; Russia	58.16	Josef Craig; Great Britain	1:00.52
S9	Federico Morlacchi; Italy	57.05	José Antonio Mari-Alcaraz; Spain	57.24	Tamás Sors; Hungary	57.41
S10	Dmitry Grigoryev; Russia	54.31	Dmitry Bartasinskiy; Russia	54.52	David Levecq; Spain	55.16
S11	Oleksandr Mashchenko; Ukraine	1:01.84	Alexander Chekurov; Russia	1:03.57	Wojciech Makowski; Poland	1:04.24
S12	Maksym Veraksa; Ukraine	52.12	Alexander Nevolin-Svetov; Russia	52.76	Dzmitry Salei; Azerbaijan	52.86
S13	Ihar Boki; Belarus	51.24	Iaroslav Denysenko; Ukraine	51.59	Aleksandr Golintovskii; Russia	53.13

== Results ==
=== S1 ===
Final

Rank	Lane	Name	Nationality	Time	Notes
1st place, gold medalist(s)	5	Hennadii Boiko	Ukraine	2:24.59	
2nd place, silver medalist(s)	4	Itzhak Mamistvalov	Israel	2:30.96	
3rd place, bronze medalist(s)	3	Anton Kol	Ukraine	2:41.96	
4	6	Christos Tampaxis	Greece	2:57.48	
5	2	Oleksandr Golovko	Ukraine	3:10.67	
6	7	Apostolos Tsaousis	Greece	3:34.90	

=== S2 ===
Final

Rank	Lane	Name	Nationality	Time	Notes
1st place, gold medalist(s)	2	Serhii Palamarchuk	Ukraine	2:04.57	ER
2nd place, silver medalist(s)	4	Dmitrii Kokarev	Russia	2:06.42	
3rd place, bronze medalist(s)	3	Aristeidis Makrodimitris	Greece	2:08.68	
4	7	Ievgen Panibratets	Ukraine	2:17.06	
5	1	Iad Josef Shalabi	Israel	2:25.84	
6	5	Jacek Czech	Poland	2:33.19	
7	8	Ales Secnik	Slovenia	2:56.24	

=== S3 ===
Final

Rank	Lane	Name	Nationality	Time	Notes
1st place, gold medalist(s)	4	Dmytro Vynohradets	Ukraine	1:46.11	
2nd place, silver medalist(s)	5	Miguel Angel Martinez	Spain	1:52.96	
3rd place, bronze medalist(s)	3	Ioannis Kostakis	Greece	1:59.44	
4	1	Alexander Makarov	Russia	2:02.14	
5	6	Mikael Fredriksson	Sweden	2:04.91	
6	2	Frederic Bussi	France	2:14.78	
7	7	Pavlo Miasoiedov	Ukraine	2:47.93	

=== S4 ===
Heat 1

Rank	Lane	Name	Nationality	Time	Notes
1	3	Michael Schoenmaker	Netherlands	1:29.95	Q
2	2	Andrii Derevinskyi	Ukraine	1:30.22	Q
3	6	Richard Oribe	Spain	1:30.27	Q
4	4	David Smetanine	France	1:31.85	Q
5	5	Darko Duric	Slovenia	1:33.06	Q
6	7	Arnost Petracek	Czech Republic	1:36.13	Q
7	8	Nelson Lopes	Portugal	1:51.98	Q
8	1	Denys Rosolovych	Ukraine	1:59.69	Q
9	0	Krzysztof Stefanowski	Poland	2:05.37	

Final

Rank	Lane	Name	Nationality	Time	Notes
1st place, gold medalist(s)	5	Andrii Derevinskyi	Ukraine	1:28.36	
2nd place, silver medalist(s)	6	David Smetanine	France	1:28.68	
3rd place, bronze medalist(s)	3	Richard Oribe	Spain	1:29.57	
4	4	Michael Schoenmaker	Netherlands	1:30.42	
5	2	Darko Duric	Slovenia	1:30.89	
6	7	Arnost Petracek	Czech Republic	1:36.92	
7	8	Denys Rosolovych	Ukraine	1:45.51	
8	1	Nelson Lopes	Portugal	1:50.30	

=== S5 ===
Heat 1

Rank	Lane	Name	Nationality	Time	Notes
1	5	Andrew Mullen	Great Britain	1:18.42	Q
2	4	Sebastian Rodriguez	Spain	1:20.51	Q
3	3	James Scully	Ireland	1:21.66	Q
4	6	Jordi Gordillo	Spain	1:23.84	Q
5	8	Roman Zhdanov	Russia	1:25.99	Q
6	2	Jonas Larsen	Denmark	1:26.06	Q
7	7	Matija Grebenic	Croatia	1:27.66	Q
8	1	Kirill Popov	Russia	1:29.48	Q
9	0	Tomi Brajsa	Croatia	1:41.69	
10	9	Matz Topkin	Estonia	2:15.01	

Final

Rank	Lane	Name	Nationality	Time	Notes
1st place, gold medalist(s)	5	Sebastian Rodriguez	Spain	1:17.05	
2nd place, silver medalist(s)	4	Andrew Mullen	Great Britain	1:18.44	
3rd place, bronze medalist(s)	3	James Scully	Ireland	1:22.40	
4	2	Roman Zhdanov	Russia	1:24.51	
5	6	Jordi Gordillo	Spain	1:25.80	
6	7	Jonas Larsen	Denmark	1:25.96	
7	1	Matija Grebenic	Croatia	1:27.06	
8	8	Kirill Popov	Russia	1:28.46	

=== S6 ===
Final

Rank	Lane	Name	Nationality	Time	Notes
1st place, gold medalist(s)	4	Sascha Kindred	Great Britain	1:09.83	
2nd place, silver medalist(s)	2	Sebastian Iwanow	Germany	1:10.16	
3rd place, bronze medalist(s)	3	Georgios Sfaltos	Greece	1:13.68	
4	6	Sergey Klyagin	Russia	1:14.99	
5	5	Yoav Valinsky	Israel	1:15.44	
6	1	Antun Brzak	Croatia	1:24.31	
7	7	Karl Forsman	Sweden	1:27.27	
8	8	Ivo Rocha	Portugal	1:33.47	

=== S7 ===
Heats

Rank	Heat	Lane	Name	Nationality	Time	Notes
1	1	4	Matthew Walker	Great Britain	1:04.34	Q
2	1	5	Sergey Sukharev	Russia	1:04.60	Q
3	2	5	Andrey Gladkov	Russia	1:06.27	Q
4	2	4	Yevheniy Bohodayko	Ukraine	1:07.10	Q
5	1	6	Nikolaos Tsotras	Greece	1:07.11	q
6	2	2	Mor Mesery	Israel	1:07.33	q
7	2	3	Tobias Pollap	Germany	1:07.34	q
8	1	3	Oleksandr Komarov	Ukraine	1:07.38	q
9	1	2	Francesco Bocciardo	Italy	1:11.09	
10	1	7	Charalampos Papaioannou	Greece	1:12.33	
11	2	7	Hannes Schuermann	Germany	1:12.56	
12	2	1	Luca Curmi	Malta	2:37.09	

Final

Rank	Lane	Name	Nationality	Time	Notes
1st place, gold medalist(s)	6	Yevheniy Bohodayko	Ukraine	1:02.37	
2nd place, silver medalist(s)	4	Matthew Walker	Great Britain	1:03.33	
3rd place, bronze medalist(s)	3	Andrey Gladkov	Russia	1:04.19	
4	5	Sergey Sukharev	Russia	1:04.25	
5	1	Tobias Pollap	Germany	1:05.50	
6	8	Oleksandr Komarov	Ukraine	1:06.21	
7	2	Nikolaos Tsotras	Greece	1:06.92	
8	7	Mor Mesery	Israel	1:07.87	

=== S8 ===
Final

Rank	Lane	Name	Nationality	Time	Notes
1st place, gold medalist(s)	4	Denis Tarasov	Russia	56.27	WR
2nd place, silver medalist(s)	5	Konstantin Lisenkov	Russia	58.16	
3rd place, bronze medalist(s)	3	Josef Craig	Great Britain	1:00.52	
4	2	Iurii Bozhynskyi	Ukraine	1:02.36	
5	7	Niels Mortensen	Denmark	1:02.79	
6	1	Torben Schmidtke	Germany	1:04.11	
7	8	Joshua Grob	Switzerland	1:06.96	
—	6	Bohdan Hrynenko	Ukraine	DSQ	

=== S9 ===
Heats

Rank	Heat	Lane	Name	Nationality	Time	Notes
1	2	4	Jose Antonio Mari Alcaraz	Spain	57.51	Q
2	2	5	Tamas Toth	Hungary	57.79	Q
3	1	4	Federico Morlacchi	Italy	58.18	Q
4	1	5	Leo Lahteenmaki	Finland	58.40	Q
5	1	3	David Grachat	Portugal	58.69	q
6	1	2	Tamas Sors	Hungary	58.80	q
7	2	3	Alexander Skaliukh	Russia	58.93	q
8	2	2	Csaba Meilinger	Hungary	59.23	q
9	1	1	Kristijan Vincetic	Croatia	59.46	
10	2	6	Matthew Wylie	Great Britain	59.58	
11	2	7	Alexander Demyanenko	Russia	1:00.30	
12	1	7	Nemanja Tadic	Serbia	1:08.51	

Final

Rank	Lane	Name	Nationality	Time	Notes
1st place, gold medalist(s)	3	Federico Morlacchi	Italy	57.05	
2nd place, silver medalist(s)	4	Jose Antonio Mari Alcaraz	Spain	57.24	
3rd place, bronze medalist(s)	7	Tamas Sors	Hungary	57.41	
4	1	Alexander Skaliukh	Russia	57.84	
5	5	Tamas Toth	Hungary	57.89	
6	2	David Grachat	Portugal	58.53	
7	6	Leo Lahteenmaki	Finland	58.62	
8	8	Csaba Meilinger	Hungary	58.85	

=== S10 ===
Heats

Rank	Heat	Lane	Name	Nationality	Time	Notes
1	2	4	Dmitry Grigorev	Russia	55.26	Q
2	1	4	Dmitry Bartasinskiy	Russia	56.81	Q
3	2	5	David Levecq	Spain	56.94	Q
4	1	5	Robert Welbourn	Great Britain	56.99	Q
5	1	3	Simone Ciulli	Italy	57.32	q
6	1	6	Artem Isaev	Russia	57.61	q
7	2	2	Rafal Kalinowski	Poland	57.63	q
8	1	2	Patryk Karlinski	Poland	58.08	q
9	2	7	Gino Caetano	Portugal	58.10	
10	2	6	Maksym Isaiev	Ukraine	58.22	
11	1	1	Klaus Steinhauer	Germany	58.95	
12	1	7	Patryk Kowalski	Poland	59.22	
13	2	1	Ludvig Nyren	Sweden	59.58	

Final

Rank	Lane	Name	Nationality	Time	Notes
1st place, gold medalist(s)	4	Dmitry Grigorev	Russia	54.31	
2nd place, silver medalist(s)	5	Dmitry Bartasinskiy	Russia	54.52	
3rd place, bronze medalist(s)	3	David Levecq	Spain	55.16	
4	6	Robert Welbourn	Great Britain	55.58	
5	2	Simone Ciulli	Italy	57.06	
5	8	Patryk Karlinski	Poland	57.06	
7	7	Artem Isaev	Russia	57.18	
8	1	Rafal Kalinowski	Poland	57.31	

=== S11 ===
Final

Rank	Lane	Name	Nationality	Time	Notes
1st place, gold medalist(s)	4	Oleksandr Mashchenko	Ukraine	1:01.84	
2nd place, silver medalist(s)	3	Alexander Chekurov	Russia	1:03.57	
3rd place, bronze medalist(s)	2	Wojciech Makowski	Poland	1:04.24	
4	5	Viktor Smyrnov	Ukraine	1:04.41	
5	6	Dmytro Zalevskyy	Ukraine	1:04.65	
6	7	Marcin Ryszka	Poland	1:09.44	

=== S12 ===
Heat 1

Rank	Lane	Name	Nationality	Time	Notes
1	4	Maksym Veraksa	Ukraine	53.04	Q
2	5	Aleksandr Nevolin-Svetov	Russia	53.65	Q
3	6	Dzmitry Salei	Azerbaijan	53.72	Q
4	1	Stepan Smagin	Russia	54.82	Q
5	8	Fabrizio Sottile	Italy	55.93	Q
6	0	Daniel Simon	Germany	56.37	Q
7	3	Danylo Chufarov	Ukraine	56.40	Q
8	7	Omar Font	Spain	56.51	Q
9	2	Oleksii Fedyna	Ukraine	58.10	

Final

Rank	Lane	Name	Nationality	Time	Notes
1st place, gold medalist(s)	4	Maksym Veraksa	Ukraine	52.12	
2nd place, silver medalist(s)	5	Aleksandr Nevolin-Svetov	Russia	52.76	
3rd place, bronze medalist(s)	3	Dzmitry Salei	Azerbaijan	52.86	
4	6	Stepan Smagin	Russia	53.93	
5	2	Fabrizio Sottile	Italy	55.00	
6	8	Omar Font	Spain	55.09	
7	1	Danylo Chufarov	Ukraine	55.15	
8	7	Daniel Simon	Germany	55.98	

=== S13 ===
Final

Rank	Lane	Name	Nationality	Time	Notes
1st place, gold medalist(s)	4	Ihar Boki	Belarus	51.24	
2nd place, silver medalist(s)	5	Iaroslav Denysenko	Ukraine	51.59	
3rd place, bronze medalist(s)	3	Aleksandr Golintovskii	Russia	53.13	
4	6	Andrei Bukov	Russia	56.38	
5	2	Antti Antero Latikka	Finland	58.63	
6	7	Vitor Encarnacao	Portugal	59.51	

== See also ==
- List of IPC world records in swimming
