= Hannah Russell =

British Paralympic swimmer (born 1996)

Hannah Russell OBE
Personal information
- Full name: Hannah Russell
- Nationality: British
- Born: 5 August 1996 (age 29) Chertsey, England

Sport
- Sport: Swimming
- Club: Woking SC
Medal record
Women's para swimming
Representing Great Britain
Paralympic Games
Gold medal – first place	2016 Rio de Janeiro	100 m backstroke S12
Gold medal – first place	2016 Rio de Janeiro	50 m freestyle S12
Gold medal – first place	2020 Tokyo	100 m backstroke S12
Silver medal – second place	2012 London	400 m freestyle S12
Bronze medal – third place	2012 London	100 m butterfly S12
Bronze medal – third place	2016 Rio de Janeiro	100 m freestyle S13
Bronze medal – third place	2020 Tokyo	100m freestyle S12
World Championships
Gold medal – first place	2013 Montreal	100 m backstroke S12
Gold medal – first place	2015 Glasgow	50 m freestyle S12
Silver medal – second place	2013 Montreal	100 m butterfly S12
Silver medal – second place	2013 Montreal	50 m freestyle S12
Silver medal – second place	2013 Montreal	100 m freestyle S12
Silver medal – second place	2015 Glasgow	100 m backstroke S12
Silver medal – second place	2015 Glasgow	100 m freestyle S13
Silver medal – second place	2022 Madeira	50m freestyle S12
Silver medal – second place	2022 Madeira	100m freestyle S12
Bronze medal – third place	2013 Montreal	400 m freestyle S12
European Championships
Gold medal – first place	2014 Eindhoven	100m backstroke S12
Gold medal – first place	2016 Funchal	100 m backstroke S12
Silver medal – second place	2014 Eindhoven	50m freestyle S12
Silver medal – second place	2014 Eindhoven	100m freestyle S12
Silver medal – second place	2014 Eindhoven	400m freestyle S12
Silver medal – second place	2014 Eindhoven	100m butterfly S12
Silver medal – second place	2014 Eindhoven	200m medley S12
Silver medal – second place	2016 Funchal	50 m freestyle S12
Bronze medal – third place	2016 Funchal	100 m freestyle S13
Representing England
Commonwealth Games
Silver medal – second place	2022 Birmingham	50 m freestyle S13

Hannah Russell (born 5 August 1996) is a British Paralympic swimmer competing in S12 classification events. In 2012, she became British S12 champion in the 100m backstroke and qualified for the 2012 Summer Paralympic Games where she won a silver in the 400m freestyle and a bronze in the 100m butterfly. In the 2016 Summer Paralympic Games, she won the gold medal in the 100m backstroke with the time of 1:06:06 earning her the World Record.

== Career history ==
=== Road to London 2012 ===
Russell was born in Ottershaw, Surrey in 1992. Russell, who has a visual impairment, took up swimming at the age of five, first joining Woking Swimming Club, before then moving to Guildford City Swimming Club at the age of twelve. She was educated at Gordon's School in West End in Surrey, before switching to Kelly College in Tavistock. In 2010, she was scouted through the 'Playground to Podium' initiative, a British system of spotting sporting talent in young people with a disability. After being classified as S12 in 2011, she entered the 2011 IPC European Championships, in Berlin. There she won two medals, silver in the 100 m backstroke and bronze in the 100 m butterfly. In 2012, she took part in the 2012 British Championships, taking another two medals, taking gold in the 100 m backstroke and silver in the 400 m freestyle. During the British Championship, Russell broke the European record in the S12 class 100 m backstroke, with a time of 1:09.52. Later that month, at the Nationwide Junior and Youth Swimming Championships in Sheffield, she broke two S12 world records, in the 400 m freestyle and the 100 m backstroke.

Although stating that her sights were set on qualifying for the 2016 Summer Paralympics in Rio, Russell's results were good enough to make the Great Britain swimming team for the 2012 Games in London. At 16 years old, she was one of the youngest members of the team, and was entered into five S12 events; the 50 m freestyle, 100 m freestyle, 400 m freestyle, 100 m backstroke, and 100 m butterfly. In her first event, the 400 m freestyle she swam a personal best of 4:38.60 to take the silver, her first paralympic medal. She finished 0.71 seconds behind Oxana Savchenko of Russia. She won her second medal of the Games, a bronze, in the 100 m butterfly.

=== Montreal to Rio ===
In 2013 Russell entered her first IPC Swimming World Championships when she travelled to Montreal as part of the Great Britain team. There she won five medals, a bronze in the 400m freestyle, three silver in the 50m freestyle, 100m freestyle and 100m butterfly and became world champion in the 100m backstroke. The following year she took part in the 2014 IPC Swimming European Championships in Eindhoven. At the games she continued her rivalry with Russian Darya Stukalova which began in Montreal. Russell won six medals, all silver, apart from the 100m backstroke for which she took gold on the day of her eighteenth birthday. Just after her eighteenth birthday, she returned to Woking Swimming Club and has had dual membership of Woking Swimming Club and City of Manchester Aquatics since May 2016. Her final major international before the 2016 Paralympics was the 2015 IPC Swimming World Championships, held in Glasgow. The 2015 Championships had a narrower list of events for S12 classification swimmers, and Russell entered only three events, winning gold in the 50m freestyle and two silver medals in the 100m backstroke and 100m freestyle.

=== Mental health break ===
In 2019 Russell took a break from swimming as a result of anxiety and depression. During this time she completed a degree in sports science from the University of Salford and was inspired to return to swimming by watching the 2019 Para-swimming World Championships.

=== Tokyo 2020 ===
At the Tokyo 2020 Paralympic Games Russell won the gold medal in the S12 Women's 100m Backstroke and a bronze medal in the S12 Women's 100m Freestyle, also competing in the S13 Women's 50m Freestyle.

Russell was appointed Member of the Order of the British Empire (MBE) in the 2017 New Year Honours and Officer of the Order of the British Empire (OBE) in the 2022 New Year Honours for services to swimming.

At the Commonwealth Games in Birmingham in 2022, Hannah Russell won her first Commonwealth Games medal. She took the silver medal in the Women’s 50m Freestyle S13.
