= 2014 IPC Swimming European Championships – Women's 200 metre individual medley =

The Women's 200 metre individual medley at the 2014 IPC Swimming European Championships was held at the Pieter van den Hoogenband Swimming Stadium, in Eindhoven from 4–10 August.

== Medalists ==
Event	Gold		Silver		Bronze	
SM5	Sarah Louise Rung; Denmark	3:25.37	Teresa Perales; Spain	3:42.23	Nataliia Shestopal; Ukraine	3:53.01
SM6	Ellie Simmonds; Great Britain	3:04.07 WR	Yelyzaveta Mereshko; Ukraine	3:09.00	Anastasia Diodorova; Russia	3:20.49
SM7	Oxana Guseva; Russia	3:16.05	Arianna Talamona; Italy	3:26.11	Mina Marie Heyerdal Klausen; Norway	3:37.41
SM8	Stephanie Slater; Great Britain	2:41.73	Olesya Vladykina; Russia	2:46.36	Amalie Vinther; Denmark	3:03.16
SM9	Amy Marren; Great Britain	2:35.10	Stephanie Millward; Great Britain	2:38.08	Sarai Gascon; Spain	2:38.18
SM10	Nina Ryabova; Russia	2:34.30	Oliwia Jablonska; Poland	2:36.42	Eleni Papadopoulos; Great Britain	2:36.89
SM11	Daniela Schulte; Germany	2:58.63	Elisabeth Egel; Estonia	3:01.54	Maja Reichard; Sweden	3:02.40
SM12	Darya Stukalova; Russia	2:29.39	Hannah Russell; Great Britain	2:35.79	Maria Delgado Nadal; Spain	2:44.97
SM13	Joanna Mendak; Poland	2:38.67	Deborah Font; Spain	2:40.31	Elena Krawzow; Germany	2:41.99
SM14	Valeriia Shabalina; Russia	2:24.18 WR	Marlou van der Kulk; Netherlands	2:28.94	Jessica-Jane Applegate; Great Britain	2:30.43

== See also ==
- List of IPC world records in swimming
