= 2014 IPC Swimming European Championships – Women's 100 metre breaststroke =

The Women’s 100 metre breaststroke at the 2014 IPC Swimming European Championships was held at the Pieter van den Hoogenband Swimming Stadium in Eindhoven from 4–10 August.

== Medalists ==
Event	Gold		Silver		Bronze	
SB4	Sarah Louise Rung; Norway	1:44.64	Giulia Ghiretti; Italy	2:00.10	Natalia Shavel; Belarus	2:01.27
SB5	Kirsten Bruhn; Germany	1.37.90	Sabine Weber-Treiber; Austria	1:54.90	Fanni Illes; Hungary	1.59.13
SB6	Ellie Simmonds; Great Britain	1:41.26	Nina Kozlova; Ukraine	1:53.12	Arianna Talamona; Italy	1:54.83
SB7	Ulyana Kuznetsova; Russia	1:29.54 ER	Oksana Khrul; Ukraine	1:35.96	Lisa den Braber; Netherlands	1:36.17
SB8	Claire Cashmore; United Kingdom; Olesya Vladykina; Russia	1:20.93	—		Paulina Wozniak; Poland	1:24.87
SB9	Chantalle Zijderveld; Netherlands	1:17.39 ER	Khrystyna Yurchenko; Ukraine	1:19.32	Nina Ryabova; Russia	1:20.57
SB11	Maja Reichard; Sweden	1:28.74	Yana Berezhna; Ukraine	1:31.66	Elisabeth Egel; Estonia	1:35.30
SB12	Karolina Pelendritou; Cyprus	1:16.63	Emely Telle; Germany	1:20.82	Carla Casals; Spain	1:23.12
SB13	Elena Krawzow; Germany	1:19.55 ER	Deborah Font Jiménez; Spain	1:23.90	Maryna Stabrovska; Ukraine	1:24.29
SB14	Michelle Alonso Morales; Spain	1:15.83 WR	Magda Toeters; Netherlands	1:17.60	Nicole Lough; Great Britain	1:18.27

== See also ==
- List of IPC world records in swimming
