= 2018 World Para Swimming European Championships – Men's 50 metres butterfly =

The men's 50 metres butterfly at the 2018 World Para Swimming European Championships was held at the National Aquatic Centre in Dublin from 13 to 19 August. Two classification finals were held in all over this event.

== Medalists ==
Event	Gold		Silver		Bronze	
S5	Yaroslav Semenenko (UKR)	35.90	Andrew Mullen (GBR)	37.28	Beytullah Eroglu (TUR)	38.87
S6	David Sanchez Sierra (ESP)	34.26	Alejandro Yared Rojas Cabrera (ESP)	36.13	Bence Ivan (HUN)	37.65
WR world record | AR area record | CR championship record | GR games record | NR national record | OR Olympic record | PB personal best | SB season best | WL world leading (in a given season)

== See also ==
- List of IPC world records in swimming
