= Scott Quin =

Scottish swimmer (born 1990)

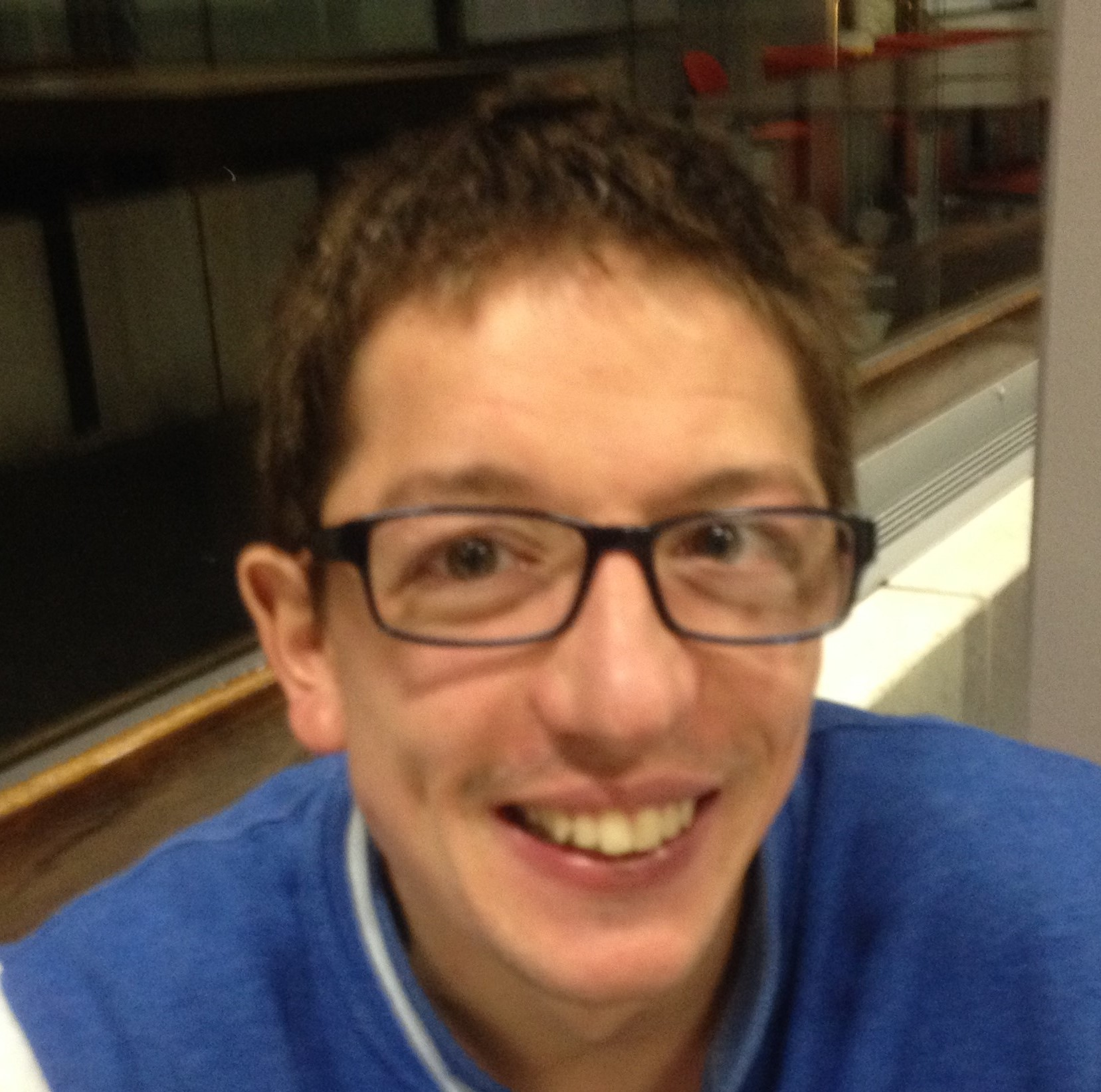

Personal information
- Born: 1 July 1990 (age 35) Edinburgh, Scotland
- Height: 1.70 m (5 ft 7 in)

Sport
- Country: United Kingdom
- Sport: Swimming
- Club: Warrender Baths Club
- Coached by: Laurel Bailey / Kris Gilchrist
Medal record
Men's para swimming
Representing Great Britain
Paralympic Games
Silver medal – second place	2016 Rio de Janeiro	100 m backstroke (S14)
World Championships
Silver medal – second place	2015 Glasgow	100 m breaststroke SB14
European Championships
Gold medal – first place	2016 Funchal	100 m breaststroke – SB14
Silver medal – second place	2014 Eindhoven	100 m breaststroke SB14

Scott Quin (born 1 July 1990) is a Scottish parasport swimmer competing in S14, SB14 and SM14 classification events, specialising in the 100m breaststroke. He has won medals at both the IPC Swimming European Championships and the IPC Swimming World Championships.

== Personal history ==
Quin was born in Edinburgh, Scotland in 1990. He has Crouzon syndrome and tunnel vision. He attended Willowpark Primary and completed his secondary education at Saltersgate.

== Sporting career ==
Quin took up swimming in 2000, joining his first swimming club Loanhead Dolphins. He switched club to Warrender Baths Club and in 2011 he made a major competitive breakthrough when he finished fifth in the MC (multi-classification) 100m breaststroke at the British Swimming Championships in Manchester. His achievements in Manchester saw him secure a place with the British team to compete at the 2011 IPC Swimming European Championships in Berlin, again coming fifth in the final.

In 2012 Quin took his first major British medal when he won bronze at the MC 100m breaststroke at the London Aquatics Centre. Later that year Quin faced a personal setback when he failed to make the British squad for the 2012 Summer Paralympics, after missing qualification by 0.11 seconds. He rallied himself in 2013 to win gold at the British Gas International event in March where he set a new personal best in the 100m breaststroke. A month later he secured a place with the British team at the World Championship qualification trials held in Sheffield. At the 2013 IPC Swimming World Championships in Montreal, Quinn finished second in his heat and in the final posted a time of 1:08.81 to finish fifth.

In 2014 Quin again made the British squad, travelling to Eindhoven to compete in the IPC Swimming European Championships. At the Championships he competed in both the 200m individual medley SM14 and his favoured 100m breaststroke S14. He finished just outside the medal position in fourth in the medley, but he won his first major international medal when he took silver behind Marc Evers of the Netherlands. Quin followed his success in Eindhoven when he represented Great Britain at his second IPC World Championships, this time on home soil when the competition was held in Glasgow. In a repeat of the European result, Quin won silver behind Evers, sharing second place with world record holder Yasuhiro Tanaka with whom he recorded an identical time of 1:07.99.
