= Dzmitry Salei =

Belarusian Paralympic swimmer

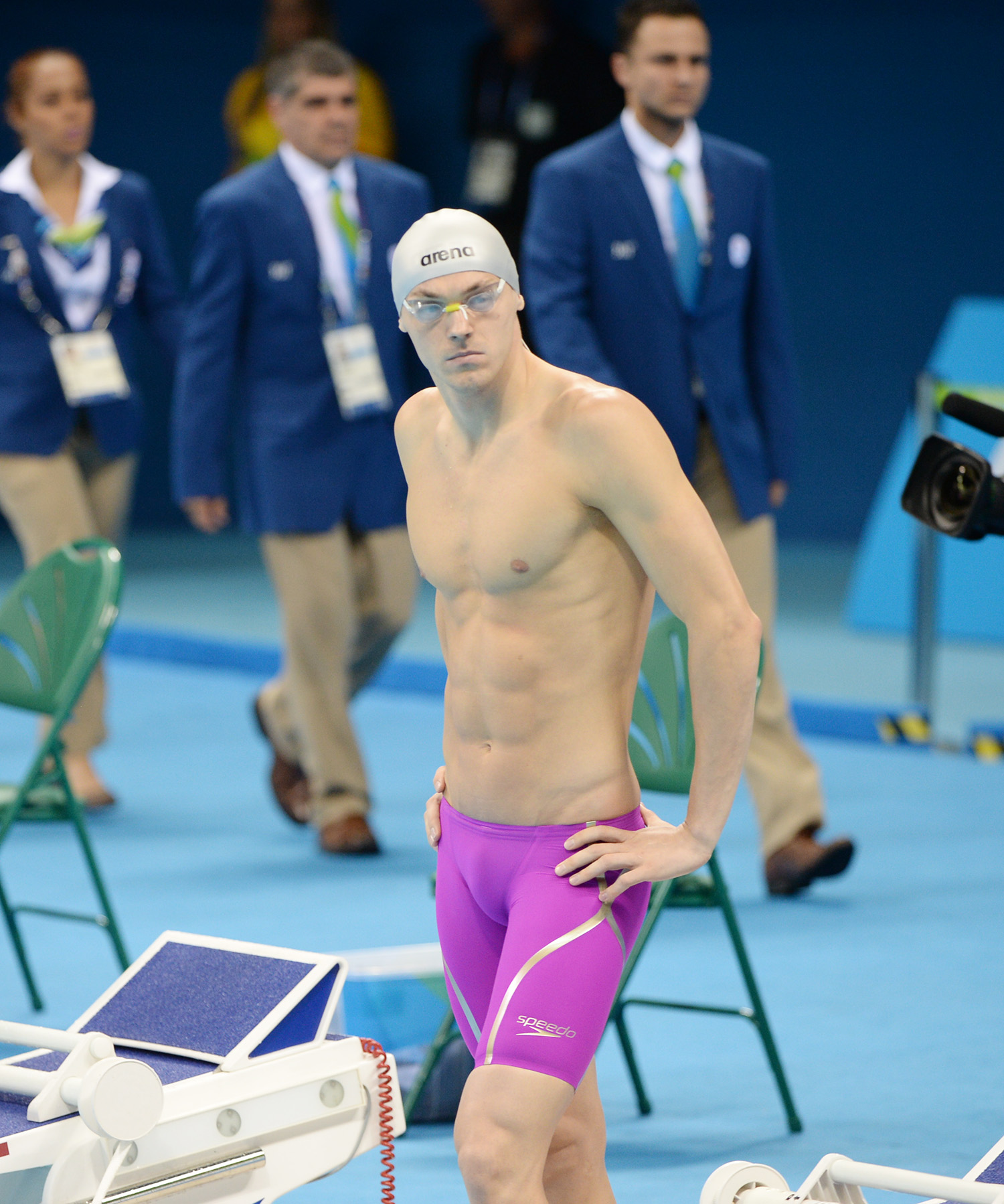
- Dzmitry Salei (2016)

Personal information
- Nationality: Belarus
- Born: November 3, 1989 (age 36)

Sport
- Sport: Swimming
Medal record
Men's para swimming
Representing Belarus
Paralympic Games
Gold medal – first place	2008 Beijing	100 m butterfly S13
World Championships
Gold medal – first place	2010 Eindhoven	50m Freestyle S13
Gold medal – first place	2010 Eindhoven	100m Freestyle S13
Silver medal – second place	2006 Durban	4x100m Freestyle Relay 49 Pts
Silver medal – second place	2006 Durban	4x100m Medley Relay 49 Pts
Silver medal – second place	2010 Eindhoven	100m Butterfly S13
Silver medal – second place	2010 Eindhoven	200m Individual Medley SM13
European Championships
Silver medal – second place	2009 Reykjavik	100 m freestyle S13
Silver medal – second place	2009 Reykjavik	100 m butterfly S13
Bronze medal – third place	2009 Reykjavik	200 m medley SM13
Representing Azerbaijan
Paralympic Games
Silver medal – second place	2016 Rio de Janeiro	50 metre freestyle S12
Silver medal – second place	2016 Rio de Janeiro	100 m breaststroke SB12
World Championships
Silver medal – second place	2015 Glasgow	100m breaststroke SB12
Bronze medal – third place	2015 Glasgow	200 m medley SM13
Bronze medal – third place	2015 Glasgow	50 metre freestyle - S12
European Championships
Gold medal – first place	2014 Eindhoven	200m medley S12
Silver medal – second place	2014 Eindhoven	50m freestyle S12
Silver medal – second place	2014 Eindhoven	100m butterfly S12
Silver medal – second place	2016 Funchal	50m freestyle S12
Silver medal – second place	2016 Funchal	100 m breaststroke – SB12
Bronze medal – third place	2014 Eindhoven	100m freestyle S12
Bronze medal – third place	2014 Eindhoven	100m breaststroke SB12
Representing Neutral Paralympic Athletes
World Championships
Silver medal – second place	2025 Singapore	100 m butterfly S12

Dzmitry Salei (born 3 November 1989) is a visually impaired Belarusian Paralympic swimmer who temporarily switched national teams to Azerbaijan.

He competed for Belarus at the 2008 and 2012 Summer Paralympics winning the gold in the 100m butterfly S13.

His brother is Raman Salei, also a Paralympic swimmer.
