= 2013 IPC Swimming World Championships – Women's 4 × 100 metre freestyle relay =

The women's 4 x 100 metre freestyle relay at the 2013 IPC Swimming World Championships was held at the Parc Jean Drapeau Aquatic Complex in Montreal from 12–18 August.

== Medalists ==
Points	Gold	Silver	Bronze
34 pts	Stephanie Millward S9; Susannah Rodgers S7; Claire Cashmore S9; Amy Marren S9; United Kingdom	Aurelie Rivard S10; Morgan Bird S8; Katarina Roxon S9; Brianna Nelson S7; Canada	Cortney Jordan S7; Anna Johannes S9; Elizabeth Smith S9; Jessica Long S8; United States

== See also ==
- List of IPC world records in swimming
