= Sebastian Iwanow =

German Paralympic swimmer

Personal information
- Nationality: German
- Born: 29 June 1985 (age 41) Bergisch Gladbach, Germany
- Education: Humboldt University of Berlin

Sport
- Disability class: S6, SB6, SM6
- Club: SG Bayer
Medal record
Representing Germany
Paralympic Games
Silver medal – second place	2012 London	100 m freestyle - S6
Bronze medal – third place	2012 London	100 m backstroke - S6
IPC Swimming World Championships
Gold medal – first place	2010 Eindhoven	100 m freestyle - S6
Bronze medal – third place	2006 Durban	S6 100 m freestyle - S6
Bronze medal – third place	2010 Eindhoven	50 m freestyle - S6
Bronze medal – third place	2015 Glasgow	200 m medley SM6
IPC European Championships
Gold medal – first place	2014 Eindhoven	50 m freestyle – S6
Gold medal – first place	2014 Eindhoven	400 m freestyle – S6
Silver medal – second place	2014 Eindhoven	100 m freestyle – S6
Silver medal – second place	2014 Eindhoven	100 m backstroke – S6
Silver medal – second place	2016 Funchal	100 m backstroke – S6
Bronze medal – third place	2014 Eindhoven	50 m butterfly – S6

Sebastian Iwanow (born 29 June 1985) is a German paraswimmer and Paralympic medal winner.

== Biography ==
Iwanow was born in 1985 in Bergisch Gladbach. He competes in the S6, SM6 and SB6 classifications.
