= 2014 IPC Swimming European Championships – Men's 100 metre breaststroke =

The Men’s 100 metre breaststroke at the 2014 IPC Swimming European Championships was held at the Pieter van den Hoogenband Swimming Stadium, in Eindhoven from 4–10 August.

== Medallists ==
Event	Gold		Silver		Bronze	
SB4	Ricardo Ten; Spain	1:37.29	Antonios Tsapatakis; Greece	1:39.23	Efrem Morelli; Italy	1:49.64
SB5	Karl Forsman; Sweden	1:36.44	Iurii Luchkin; Russia	1:38.11	Niels Grunenberg; Germany	1.38.80
SB6	Yevheniy Bohodayko; Ukraine	1:22.22	Torben Schmidtke; Germany	1:22.97	Christoph Burkard; Germany	1:28.92
SB7	Simon Boer; Netherlands	1:20.33	Bohdan Hrynenko; Ukraine	1:23.27	Sascha Kindred; Great Britain	1:27.28
SB8	Federico Morlacchi; Italy	1:13.00	Oscar Salguero Galisteo; Spain	1:14.72	James Crisp; Great Britain	1:16.14
SB9	Pavel Poltavtsev; Russia	1:06.65	Dmitry Grigorev; Russia	1:09.28	Dmitry Bartasinskiy; Russia	1.11.14
SB11	Oleksandr Mashchenko; Ukraine	1:16.02	Israel Oliver Peña; Spain	1:17.39	Viktor Smyrnov; Ukraine	1:17.98
SB12	Oleksii Fedyna; Ukraine	1:04.07 WR	Uladzimir Izotau; Belarus	1:05.62	Dzmitry Salei; Azerbaijan	1:06.97
SB14	Marc Evers; Netherlands	1:07.11	Scott Quin; Great Britain	1:07.95	Aaron Moores; Great Britain	1:09.65

== See also ==
- List of IPC world records in swimming
