= 2014 IPC Swimming European Championships – Men's 4 × 50 metre medley relay =

The Men's 50 metre x 4 medley at the 2014 IPC Swimming European Championships was held at the Pieter van den Hoogenband Swimming Stadium, in Eindhoven from 4–10 August.

As with other disability relay events, the medley works on a points system whereby the classification numbers of each swimmer are totaled to give a number no higher than 20.

== Medalists ==
Event	Gold		Silver		Bronze	
20pts	Dmytro Vynohradets (S3); Oleksandr Komarov (SB6); Yevheniy Bohodayko (S7); Andrii Derevinskyi (S4); Ukraine	2:43.16	Miguel Ángel Martínez (S3); Miguel Luque (SB3); José Antonio Mari-Alcaraz (S9); Sebastián Rodríguez (S5); Spain	2:46.86	Aleksei Lyzhikhin (S4); Iuruii Luchkin (SB5); Sergey Klyagin(S6); Roman Zhdanov (S5); Russia	2:54.31

== See also ==
- List of IPC world records in swimming
