= 2013 IPC Swimming World Championships – Women's 4 × 100 metre medley relay =

The women's 4 x 100 metre medley relay at the 2013 IPC Swimming World Championships was held at the Parc Jean Drapeau Aquatic Complex in Montreal from 12–18 August.

== Medalists ==
Points	Gold	Silver	Bronze
34 points	Stephanie Millward S9; Claire Cashmore SB8; Stephanie Slater S8; Amy Marren S9; United Kingdom	Nina Ryabova S10; Olesya Vladykina SB8; Irina Grazhdanova S9; Oxana Guseva S7; Russia	Lu Dong S6; Zhang Meng SB9; Jiang Shengnan S8; Lin Ping S9; China

== See also ==
- List of IPC world records in swimming
