= 2014 IPC Swimming European Championships – Women's 100 metre backstroke =

The Women's 100 metre backstroke at the 2014 IPC Swimming European Championships was held at the Pieter van den Hoogenband Swimming Stadium, in Eindhoven from 4–10 August.

== Medalists ==
Event	Gold		Silver		Bronze	
S2	Ganna Ielisavetska; Ukraine	2:16.31 WR	Iryna Sotska; Ukraine	2:21.11	Ingrid Thunem; Norway	2:27.94
S6	Anastasia Diodorova; Russia	1:28.76	Julia Castelló; Spain	1:33.06	Oksana Khrul; Ukraine	1:34.73
S7	Kirsten Bruhn; Germany	1:23.05	Susannah Rodgers; Great Britain	1:30.24	Mina Marie Heyerdal Klausen; Norway	1:32.74
S8	Stephanie Slater; United Kingdom	1:17.42	Olesya Vladykina; Russia	1:19.57	Kateryna Istomina; Ukraine	1:22.89
S9	Stephanie Millward; Great Britain	1:10.98	Amy Marren; Great Britain	1:13.21	Nuria Marques Soto; Spain	1:13.90
S10	Summer Mortimer; Netherlands	1:06.46 ER	Alice Tai; Great Britain	1:09.19	Bianka Pap; Hungary	1:10.96
S11	Cecilia Camellini; Italy	1:23.32	Daniela Schulte; Germany	1:23.84	Maryna Piddubna; Ukraine	1:25.77
S12	Hannah Russell; United Kingdom	1:08.29	Darya Stukalova; Russia	1:09.28	Oxana Savchenko; Russia	1:12.07
S13	Anna Krivshina; Russia	1:08.47	Sterre Veerman; Netherlands	1:13.84	Karina Petrikovicova; Slovakia	1:17.13
S14	Valeriia Shabalina; Russia	1:06.72	Marlou van der Kulk; Netherlands	1:08.26	Jessica-Jane Applegate; Great Britain	1:08.57

== See also ==
- List of IPC world records in swimming
