= 2014 IPC Swimming European Championships – Men's 4 × 50 metre freestyle relay =

The Men's 50 metre x 4 freestyle at the 2014 IPC Swimming European Championships was held at the Pieter van den Hoogenband Swimming Stadium, in Eindhoven from 4–10 August.

As with other disability relay events, the freestyle works on a points system whereby the classification numbers of each swimmer are totaled to give a number no higher than 20.

== Medalists ==
Event	Gold		Silver		Bronze	
20pts	Iaroslav Semenenko (S6); Dmytro Vynohradets (S3); Andrii Derevinskyi (S4); Yevheniy Bohodayko (S7); Ukraine	2:28.41	Richard Oribe (S4); Ricardo Ten (S5); Jordi Gordillo (S5); Sebastián Rodríguez (S5); Spain	2:36.11	Aleksei Lyzhikhin (S4); Kirill Popov (S5); Roman Zhdanov(S5); Sergey Klyagin (S6); Russia	2:46.32

== See also ==
- List of IPC world records in swimming
