= 2014 IPC Swimming European Championships – Men's 200 metre individual medley =

The Men’s 200 metre individual medley at the 2014 IPC Swimming European Championships was held at the Pieter van den Hoogenband Swimming Stadium, in Eindhoven from 4–10 August.

== Medalists ==
Event	Gold		Silver		Bronze	
SM5	Andrew Mullen; Great Britain	3:06.78	Antonios Tsapatakis; Greece	3:19.28	Roman Zhdanov; Russia	3:19.42
SM6	Sascha Kindred; Great Britain	2:40.82 ER	Iaroslav Semenenko; Ukraine	2:58.25	Yoav Valinsky; Israel	3:01.76
SM7	Yevheniy Bohodayko; Ukraine	2:34.15	Andrey Galdkov; Russia	2:43.61	Tobias Pollap; Germany	2:47.65
SM8	Oliver Hynd; Great Britain	2.52.22	Konstantin Lisenkov; Russia	2:30.34	Niels Korfitz Mortensen; Denmark	2:32.81
SM9	Federico Morlacchi; Italy	2:17.82	Tamás Sors; Hungary; Tamás Tóth; Hungary	2:20.73	—	
SM10	Denys Dubrov; Ukraine	2:15.05	Dmitry Grigoryev; Russia	2:15.60	Dmytro Vanzenko; Ukraine	2:15.94
SM11	Israel Oliver; Spain	2:26.29	Oleksandr Mashchenko; Ukraine	2:29.83	Viktor Smyrnov; Ukraine	2:34.68
SM12	Dzmitry Salei; Azerbaijan	2:13.00	Danylo Chufarov; Ukraine	2:14.24	Sergii Klippert; Ukraine	2:15.19
SM14	Marc Evers; Netherlands	2.11.87 WR	Jack Thomas; Great Britain	2:17.99	Craig Harris; Great Britain	2:18.71

== See also ==
- List of IPC world records in swimming
