= 2014 IPC Swimming European Championships – Men's 200 metre freestyle =

The men's 200 metre freestyle at the 2014 IPC Swimming European Championships was held at the Pieter van den Hoogenband Swimming Stadium in Eindhoven from 4–10 August.

== Medalists ==
Event	Gold		Silver		Bronze	
S2	Dmitrii Kokarev; Russia	4:22.06 WR	Serhii Palamarchuk; Ukraine	4:35.81	Aristeidis Makrodimitris; Greece	4:37.54
S3	Dmytro Vynohradets; Ukraine	3:44.62	Miguel Angel Martinez; Spain	3:52.95	Ioannis Kostakis; Greece	4:02.46
S4	Andrii Derevinskyi; Ukraine	3:08.33	Richard Oribe; Spain	3:10.71	Michael Schoenmaker; Netherlands	3:12.25
S5	Andrew Mullen; Great Britain	2:46.27	Sebastian Rodriguez; Spain	2:47.61	James Scully; Ireland	2:53.13
S14	Jon Margeir Sverrisson; Iceland	1:58.60 ER	Thomas Hamer; Great Britain	2:00.36	Jack Thomas; Great Britain	2:02:42

== See also ==
- List of IPC world records in swimming
