= 2014 IPC Swimming European Championships – Women's 400 metre freestyle =

Women's 400 meter freestyle swimming competition

The Women’s 400 metre freestyle at the 2014 IPC Swimming European Championships was held at the Pieter van den Hoogenband Swimming Stadium in Eindhoven from 4–10 August.

== Medalists ==
Event	Gold		Silver		Bronze	
S6	Ellie Simmonds; United Kingdom	5:28.31	Yelyzaveta Mereshko; Ukraine	5:35.08	Thelma Bjornsdottir; Iceland	6:03.67
S7	Susannah Rodgers; United Kingdom	5:22.74	Oxana Guseva; Russia	5:40.87	Arianna Talamona; Italy	5:45.29
S8	Amalie Vinther; Denmark	5:17.48	Romy Pansters; Netherlands	5:29.83	Lisa den Braber; Netherlands	5:40.53
S9	Stephanie Millward; United Kingdom	4:41.99	Amy Marren; United Kingdom	4:47.66	Nuria Marques; Spain	5:01.95
S10	Elodie Lorandi; France	4:38.76	Oliwia Jablonska; Poland	4:44.04	Alice Tai; Great Britain	4:47.52
S12	Darya Stukalova; Russia	4:43.78	Hannah Russell; Great Britain	4:45.72	Naomi Maike Schnittger; Germany	4:48.84
S13	Deborah Font; Spain	4:46.12	Marta Gómez; Spain	4:53.47	Anna Krivshina; Russia	5:07.09

== See also ==
- List of IPC world records in swimming
