= 2014 IPC Swimming European Championships – Mixed 4 × 50 metre freestyle relay =

The Mixed 50 metre x 4 freestyle at the 2014 IPC Swimming European Championships was held at the Pieter van den Hoogenband Swimming Stadium, in Eindhoven from 4–10 August.

As with other disability relay events, the freestyle works on a points system whereby the classification numbers of each swimmer are totaled to give a number no higher than 20. This was the first time the European Championships have included a mixed sex event, which required each team to be made up of two male and two female competitors.

== Medalists ==
Event	Gold		Silver		Bronze	
20pts	Julia Castelló (S6); Richard Oribe (S4); Teresa Perales (S5); Sebastián Rodríguez (S5); Spain	2:36.29	Efrem Morelli (S5); Arjola Trimi (S4); Andrea Castagneto (S5); Stefania Chiarioni (S5); Italy	2:38.38	Sergey Sukharev (S7); Iuliia Shishova (S3); Aleksei Lyzhikhin (S4); Anastasia Diodorova(S6); Russia	2:40.35

== See also ==
- List of IPC world records in swimming
