= Swimming at the 2020 Summer Paralympics – Women's 100 metre backstroke S12 =

Women's 100 metre backstroke S12 at the XVI Paralympic Games
- Venue: Tokyo Aquatics Centre
- Dates: 27 August 2021
- Competitors: 8 from 8 nations

Medalists
1st place, gold medalist(s)		Hannah Russell	Great Britain
2nd place, silver medalist(s)		Daria Pikalova	RPC
3rd place, bronze medalist(s)		Maria Carolina Santiago	Brazil

The Women's 100 metre backstroke S12 event at the 2020 Paralympic Games took place on 27 August 2021, at the Tokyo Aquatics Centre.

== Final ==
17:06 27 August 2021:

100m backstroke final
Rank	Lane	Name	Nationality	Time	Notes
1st place, gold medalist(s)	5	Hannah Russell	Great Britain	1:08.44	
2nd place, silver medalist(s)	4	Daria Pikalova	RPC	1:08.76	
3rd place, bronze medalist(s)	3	Maria Carolina Santiago	Brazil	1:09.18	
4	6	María Delgado	Spain	1:12.83	
5	7	Alessia Berra	Italy	1:14.33	
6	1	Yaryna Matlo	Ukraine	1:16.25	
7	2	Analuz Pellitero	Argentina	1:17.78	
8	8	Aliya Rakhimbekova	Kazakhstan	1:23.74	
