= 2014 IPC Swimming European Championships – Women's 50 metre freestyle =

The Women’s 50 metre freestyle at the 2014 IPC Swimming European Championships was held at the Pieter van den Hoogenband Swimming Stadium, in Eindhoven from 4–10 August.

== Medallists ==
Event	Gold		Silver		Bronze	
S4	Arjola Trimi; Italy	44.11	Lisette Teunissen; Netherlands	46.97	Olga Sviderska; Ukraine	47.06 WR
S5	Teresa Perales; Spain	37.19	Inbal Pezaro; Israel	39.68	Anita Fatis; France	40.52
S6	Yelyzaveta Mereshko; Ukraine	35.19	Ellie Simmonds; Great Britain	35.23	Olena Fedota; Ukraine	37.65
S7	Susannah Rodgers; United Kingdom	33.50	Denise Grahl; Germany	33.71	Kirsten Bruhn; Germany	36.13
S8	Stephanie Slater; Great Britain	30.44 ER	Kateryna Istomina; Ukraine	31.59	Olesya Vladykina; Russia	31.90
S9	Sarai Gascón Moreno; Spain	29.04 WR	Amy Marren; United Kingdom; Natalia Mamlina; Russia	30.00	—	
S10	Summer Mortimer; Netherlands	28.12	Nina Ryabova; Russia	28.56	Elodie Lorandi; France	28.64
S11	Cecilia Camellini; Italy	31.13	Maja Reichard; Sweden	32.17	Daniela Schulte; Germany	33.86
S12	Darya Stukalova; Russia	27.42	Hannah Russell; Great Britain	27.51	Oxana Savchenko; Russia	27.58
S13	Anna Krivshina; Russia	27.77	Joanna Mendak; Poland	27.91	Elena Krawzow; Germany	28.65

== See also ==
- List of IPC world records in swimming
