= 2014 IPC Swimming European Championships – Men's 150 metre individual medley =

The Men’s 150 metre individual medley at the 2014 IPC Swimming European Championships was held at the Pieter van den Hoogenband Swimming Stadium, in Eindhoven from 4–10 August.

== Medalists ==
Event	Gold		Silver		Bronze	
SM3	Dmytro Vynohradets; Ukraine	2:49.74	Andrii Derevinskyi; Ukraine	3:05.92	Ioannis Kostakis; Netherlands	3:20.03
SM4	Jonas Larsen; Denmark	2:39.27	Miguel Luque Ávila; Spain	2:47.27	Michael Schoenmaker; Germany	2:50.77

== See also ==
- List of IPC world records in swimming
