= 2014 IPC Swimming European Championships – Men's 4 × 100 metre medley relay =

The Men's 1000 metre x 4 medley at the 2014 IPC Swimming European Championships was held at the Pieter van den Hoogenband Swimming Stadium, in Eindhoven from 4–10 August.

As with other disability relay events, the medley works on a points system whereby the classification numbers of each swimmer are totaled to give a number no higher than 34.

== Medalists ==
Event	Gold		Silver		Bronze	
34pts	Konstantin Lisenkov (S8); Pavel Poltavtsev (SB9); Alexander Skaliukh (S9); Denis Tarasov (S8); Russia	4:09.99	Oliver Hynd (S8); Jack Bridge (SB9); James Hollis (S10); Matthew Walker (S7); United Kingdom	4:20.70	Antoni Ponce Bertran (S7); Oscar Salguero Galisteo (SB8); David Levecq (S10); Jose Antonio Mari Alcaraz (S9); Spain	4:32.23

== See also ==
- List of IPC world records in swimming
