= 2014 IPC Swimming European Championships – Women's 100 metre freestyle =

The Women’s 100 metre freestyle at the 2014 IPC Swimming European Championships was held at the Pieter van den Hoogenband Swimming Stadium in Eindhoven from 4–10 August.

== Medalists ==
Event	Gold		Silver		Bronze	
S4	Arjola Trimi; Italy	1:33.89	Lisette Teunissen; Netherlands	1:36.73	Olga Sviderska; Ukraine	1:42.16
S5	Teresa Perales; Spain	1:20.32	Sarah Louise Rung; Norway	1:22.82	Inbal Pezaro; Israel	1:23.66
S6	Yelyzaveta Mereshko; Ukraine	1:13.80 ER	Ellie Simmonds; Great Britain	1:14.49	Olena Fedota; Ukraine	1:21.68
S7	Susannah Rodgers; Great Britain	1:12.06	Denise Grahl; Germany	1:15.36	Oxana Guseva; Russia	1:17.13
S8	Stephanie Slater; Great Britain	1:07.03	Amalie Vinther; Denmark	1:10.38	Romy Pansters; Netherlands	1:16.39
S9	Stephanie Millward; Great Britain	1:04.08	Amy Marren; Great Britain	1.04.22	Sarai Gascón Moreno; Spain	1:05.33
S10	Élodie Lorandi; France	1:01.05	Summer Mortimer; Netherlands	1:01.18	Oliwia Jablonska; Poland	1:03.63
S11	Cecilia Camellini; Italy	1:09.34	Daniela Schulte; Germany	1:12.61	Maja Reichard; Sweden	1:13.07
S12	Darya Stukalova; Russia	59.77	Hannah Russell; Great Britain	1:00.62	Oxana Savchenko; Russia	1:00.84
S13	Anna Krivshina; Russia	1:01.82	Joanna Mendak; Poland	1:01.83	Deborah Font; Spain	1:02.20

== See also ==
- List of IPC world records in swimming
