= Stephanie Slater =

British Paralympic swimmer

Stephanie Slater MBE
Personal information
- Full name: Stephanie Slater MBE
- Nationality: British (English)
- Born: 7 February 1991 (age 35) Preston, England

Sport
- Sport: Swimming
- Strokes: Butterfly; Medley; Sprint Freestyle
- Club: Preston Swimming Club
- Coach: NPC: Rob Greenwood & Graeme Smith. Preston Swimming Club: Steve Heaps
Medal record
Swimming
Representing Great Britain
Summer Paralympics
Gold medal – first place	2016 Rio de Janeiro	4 x 100-metre medley relay 34 pts
Silver medal – second place	2016 Rio de Janeiro	Women's S8 100m Butterfly
World Championships
Gold medal – first place	2013 Montreal	34pt 4x100m Medley Relay
Silver medal – second place	2013 Montreal	200m Individual Medley SM8
Silver medal – second place	2013 Montreal	100m Butterfly S8
IPC European Championships
Gold medal – first place	2014 Eindhoven	100m backstroke S8
Gold medal – first place	2014 Eindhoven	100m butterfly S8
Gold medal – first place	2014 Eindhoven	100m freestyle relay 34pts
Gold medal – first place	2014 Eindhoven	50m freestyle S8
Gold medal – first place	2014 Eindhoven	100m freestyle S8
Gold medal – first place	2014 Eindhoven	4x100m medley relay 34pts
Gold medal – first place	2014 Eindhoven	200m Individual Medley
Gold medal – first place	2016 Funchal	50 m freestyle S8
Gold medal – first place	2016 Funchal	100 m butterfly S8
Representing England
Commonwealth Games
Silver medal – second place	2014 Glasgow	100m freestyle S8

Stephanie Slater (born 7 February 1991) is a British Paralympic swimmer competing in S8 classification events. Slater began her sporting career as an able bodied athlete, but after suffering nerve damage to her left arm she switched to parasport.

== Early career ==
Slater was born in 1991 in Preston, England and began swimming from the age of three. A talented swimmer as a youth, Slater challenged as an able bodied athlete and began entering British Championships from 2006. Specialising in the breaststroke, she continually improved during the British Championships, finishing 4th in the 100 m breaststroke final in 2009. In the 2010 Championship, she took silver in the 50 m breaststroke and was seen as a prospect for the British team at the 2010 Commonwealth Games in Delhi, and a future Olympic athlete.

While training at Team GB's Intensive Training Centre in Swansea, she experienced severe weakness and intense pain to her left arm while swimming. The injury did not clear and she was forced to pull out from her goal of making the Commonwealth Games. After two years of several tests and scans, it was diagnosed that Slater had suffered nerve damage to her brachial plexus which ended her career as an able-bodied athlete. Slater also has a degenerative eye condition affecting both eyes called Keratoconus. Slater had to have collagen cross-linking and also a corneal transplant due to the severity of her condition.

== World Championships ==
Slater returned home to Preston to her family after her condition had been diagnosed, and having been a games maker at the London 2012 Paralympics in the Aquatics Centre, this inspired her to return to the pool as a para-swimmer. In December 2012 she began entering events as a para-swimmer. She entered the British International Disability Swimming Championships in Sheffield in April 2013. There she set a British and European record when she recorded a time of 1:11.03 in the 100 m Butterfly S8. Not only did she take the gold medal with this record time, but she also qualified for her first World Championships in Montreal.

At the IPC Swimming World Championships in Montreal 2013, Slater competed in the Women's 200m IM SM8, Women's 100m Breastroke SB8, Women's 100m Butterfly S8 and the Women's 34pt 4 × 100 m Medley Relay.

- Women's 200m IM SM8 – Silver – 2.40.73 – European record
- Women's 100m Breaststroke SB8 – 5th – 1.26.34
- Women's 100m Butterfly S8 – Silver – 1.10.12 – European record
- Women's 34pt 4 × 100 m Medley Relay (Butterfly Leg) – Gold – 4.46.21 – world record

== Commonwealth Games 2014 ==
On 22 May 2014 Slater was named as part of the England team which will compete at the 2014 Commonwealth Games in Scotland. She will be entering the S8 100m Freestyle event and was quoted as stating, "I feel very privileged to have been selected to represent England in what will be my first Commonwealth Games".

== European Championships 2014 ==
After the Commonwealth Games, Slater will be heading to the IPC European Championships, in Eindhoven, the Netherlands, in August. She secured five European Championship selection times.

Stephanie had a very successful debut at the IPC European Championships in Eindhoven. She competed in 5 individual events and two relay swims.

- Women's S8 100m Butterfly – 1.08.20 – GOLD – World Record
- Women's S8 50m Freestyle – 30.44 – GOLD – European Record
- Women's S8 100m Freestyle – 1.07.03 – GOLD
- Women's S8 100m -Backstroke – 1.17.42 – GOLD
- Women's SM8 200m Individual Medley – 2.41.73 – GOLD
- Women's 34pt 4 × 100 m Medley Relay (Butterfly leg) – 4.46.89 – GOLD
- Women's 34pt 4 × 100 m Freestyle Relay – 4.27.21 – GOLD

== Paralympic Games 2016 ==
At the 2016 Rio Paralympics, Slater won gold in the women's 4 x 100m medley relay 34pts and silver in the women's S8 100m Butterfly.

== Retirement ==
In February 2018, Slater announced her retirement, due to the degeneration of her medical conditions. She wrote, "I have thought long and hard and explored all options with my medical and support teams about this hard decision but at the end of the day I have to think about my health and well-being long-term. It came down to the fact that just one wrong dive or turn could cause a life-changing injury. It is heartbreaking for me because I felt potentially I had more to give. I have sadly been battling for the last 3 years with a decline in my health and this must be my number one priority now."

Following Stephanie's retirement she studied for a BSc (Hons) Child Nursing degree at Liverpool John Moores University, completing this with a first-class honours degree.
