= Dmitry Grigoryev (swimmer) =

Russian Paralympic swimmer

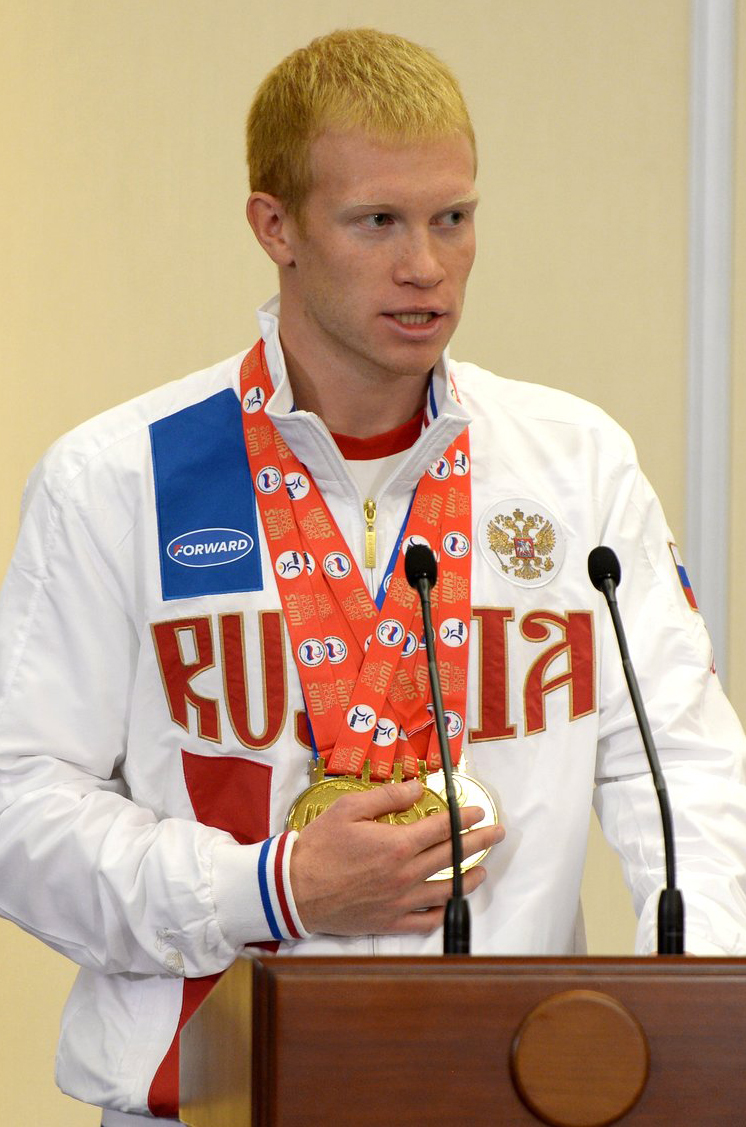
- Grigoryev in 2015

Personal information
- Native name: Дмитрий Сергеевич Григорьев
- Full name: Dmitry Sergeyevich Grigoryev
- Born: 21 August 1992 (age 33) Moscow, Russia
- Height: 1.76 m (5 ft 9 in)

Sport
- Sport: Swimming
- Club: Adaptive Sports School: Moscow
- Coached by: Alexander Shchelochkov

Achievements and titles
- Olympic finals: 2012
Medal record
Representing Russia
Paralympic Games
Silver medal – second place	2012 London	100 m butterfly – S10
Silver medal – second place	2012 London	4×100 m medley relay 34pts
Silver medal – second place	2012 London	4×100 m freestyle relay 34pts
World Championships
Gold medal – first place	2015 Glasgow	4x100 m medley relay 34pts
Silver medal – second place	2013 Montreal	100 m butterfly S10
Silver medal – second place	2013 Montreal	4x100 m medley relay 34pts
Bronze medal – third place	2013 Montreal	4x100 m freestyle relay 34pts
Bronze medal – third place	2015 Glasgow	100 m butterfly S10
European Championships
Gold medal – first place	2014 Eindhoven	50m freestyle S10
Gold medal – first place	2014 Eindhoven	100m freestyle S10
Gold medal – first place	2014 Eindhoven	100m butterfly S10
Gold medal – first place	2016 Funchal	50m freestyle S10
Gold medal – first place	2016 Funchal	100m freestyle S10
Gold medal – first place	2016 Funchal	4x100m freestyle relay 34pts
Gold medal – first place	2016 Funchal	4x100m medley relay 34pts
Silver medal – second place	2014 Eindhoven	100m breaststroke SB9
Silver medal – second place	2014 Eindhoven	200m I. Medley S8
Silver medal – second place	2016 Funchal	100 m butterfly – S10
Bronze medal – third place	2016 Funchal	200 m ind. medley SM10
Representing Neutral Paralympic Athletes
European Championships
Bronze medal – third place	2024 Madeira	100 m freestyle S10

Dmitry Sergeyevich Grigoryev (Russian: Дмитрий Сергеевич Григорьев; born 21 August 1992) is a Paralympic swimmer from Russia competing mainly in category S10 events. At the 2012 Summer Paralympics in London he won three medals, including silver in the 100 metre butterfly. He has represented Russia at three IPC World Championships with a total of five medals won.

== Personal history ==
Grigoryev was born in Moscow, Russia in 1992. After undergoing surgery to remove a tumor from his leg, Grigoryev experienced muscle atrophy and loss of control to the limb.

== Career history ==
Grigoryev took to swimming as an alternative to electo-stimulation after his operation. He first represented Russia at a major international competition at the 2010 IPC Swimming World Championships in Eindhoven. He competed in six events, with his best result being fifth place in his favoured event, the 100m butterfly.
