= 2014 IPC Swimming European Championships – Women's 4 × 100 metre freestyle relay =

The Women's 100 metre x 4 freestyle at the 2014 IPC Swimming European Championships was held at the Pieter van den Hoogenband Swimming Stadium, in Eindhoven from 4–10 August.

As with other disability relay events, the freestyle works on a points system whereby the classification numbers of each swimmer are totaled to give a number no higher than 34.

== Medalists ==
Event	Gold		Silver		Bronze	
34pts	Stephanie Millward (S9); Susannah Rodgers (S7); Stephanie Slater (S8); Alice Tai (S10); Great Britain	4:27.21	Nuria Marques (S9); Teresa Perales (S5); Sarai Gascon (S9); Isabel Yingüa Hernández (S10); Spain	4:38.71	Oxana Guseva (S7); Natalia Mamlina (S9); Olesya Vladykina(S8); Nina Ryabova (S10); Russia	4:40.31

== See also ==
- List of IPC world records in swimming
