= 2014 IPC Swimming European Championships – Men's 100 metre backstroke =

The Men’s 100 metre backstroke at the 2014 IPC Swimming European Championships was held at the Pieter van den Hoogenband Swimming Stadium, in Eindhoven from 4–10 August.

== Medalists ==
Event	Gold		Silver		Bronze	
S2	Dmitrii Kokarev; Russia	2:07.63 WR	Serhii Palamarchuk; Ukraine	2:08.11	Aristeidis Makrodimitris; Greece	2:14.27
S6	Iaroslav Semenenko; Ukraine	1:17.96	Sebastian Iwanow; Germany	1:20.37	Sergey Klyagin; Russia	1:23.79
S7	Andrey Gladkov; Russia	1:10.13	Yevheniy Bohodayko; Ukraine	1:12.85	Marian Kvasnytsia; Ukraine	1:13.94
S8	Iurii Bozhynskyi; Ukraine	1:04.56	Konstantin Lisenkov; Russia	1:05.72	Denis Tarasov; Russia	1:05.75
S9	James Crisp; Great Britain	1:04.30	Tamas Toth; Hungary	1:05.44	Patryk Biskup; Poland	1:07.08
S10	Olivier van de Voort; Netherlands	1:01.09	Kardo Ploomipuu; Estonia	1:01.27	Sven Decaesstecker; Belgium	1:04.47
S11	Dmytro Zalevskyy; Ukraine	1:08.68	Viktor Smyrnov; Ukraine	1:10.17	Oleksandr Mashchenko; Ukraine	1:13.44
S12	Aleksandr Nevolin-Svetov; Russia	1:00.21	Sergii Klippert; Ukraine	1:00.78	Roman Makarov; Russia	1:02.63
S14	Marc Evers; Netherlands	1:00.14 WR	Jack Thomas; United Kingdom	1:03.44	Aaron Moores; United Kingdom	1:03.50

== See also ==
- List of IPC world records in swimming
