= 2014 IPC Swimming European Championships – Women's 150 metre individual medley =

The Women’s 150 metre individual medley at the 2014 IPC Swimming European Championships was held at the Pieter van den Hoogenband Swimming Stadium, in Eindhoven from 4–10 August.

== Medalists ==
| Event | Gold | | Silver | | Bronze | |
|---|---|---|---|---|---|---|
| SM4 | Mariia Lafina; Ukraine | 3:14.31 | Lisette Teunissen; Netherlands | 3:19.06 | Olga Sviderska; Ukraine | 3:19.20 WR |

== See also ==
- List of IPC world records in swimming
