= 2014 IPC Swimming European Championships – Men's 100 metre butterfly =

The Men’s 100 metre butterfly at the 2014 IPC Swimming European Championships was held at the Pieter van den Hoogenband Swimming Stadium, in Eindhoven from 4–10 August.

== Medalists ==
Event	Gold		Silver		Bronze	
S8	Charles Rozoy; France	1.02.03	Denis Tarasov; Ukraine	1:02.46	Konstantin Lisenkov; Russia	1:04.44
S9	Federico Morlacchi; Italy	59.60	Alexander Skaliukh; Russia	1:00.09	Kristijan Vincetic; Croatia	1:00.70
S10	Dmitry Grigorev; Russia	56.84 ER	David Julián Levecq Vives; Spain	58.05	Denys Dubrov; Ukraine	58.53
S12	Roman Makarov; Russia	57.58	Dzmitry Salei; Azerbaijan	57.97	Anton Stabrovskyy; Ukraine	59.44

== See also ==
- List of IPC world records in swimming
