= 2014 IPC Swimming European Championships – Men's 400 metre freestyle =

The men's 400 metre freestyle at the 2014 IPC Swimming European Championships was held at the Pieter van den Hoogenband Swimming Stadium in Eindhoven from 4–10 August.

== Medalists ==
Event	Gold		Silver		Bronze	
S6	Sebastian Iwanow; Germany	5:39.20	Yoav Valinsky; Israel	5:43.07	Karl Forsman; Sweden	6:14.91
S7	Andrey Gladkov; Russia	4:49.80	Andreas Skaar Bjornstad; Norway	4:59.76	Marian Kvasnytsia; Ukraine	5:02.89
S8	Oliver Hynd; United Kingdom	4:31.66	Denis Tarasov; Russia	4:33.67	Josef Craig; United Kingdom	4:38.14
S9	Federico Morlacchi; Italy	4:18.34	Kristijan Vincetic; Croatia	4:23.14	David Grachat; Portugal	4.26.61
S10	Dmitry Bartasinskiy; Russia	4:16.04 ER	Robert Welbourn; Great Britain	4:12.96	Patryk Karlinski; Poland	4:18.22
S12	Danylo Chufarov; Ukraine	4:10.19	Sergey Punko; Russia	4:14.73	Stepan Smagin; Russia	4:26.18

== See also ==
- List of IPC world records in swimming
