= Nicole Lough =

British Paralympic swimmer

Personal information
- Born: South Shields, Great Britain

Sport
- Country: Great Britain
- Sport: Paralympic swimming
- Disability class: SB14
- Event: Breaststroke
- Club: Team Northumbria
Medal record
Paralympic swimming
Representing Great Britain
World Championships
| Bronze medal – third place | 2013 Montreal | Women's 100m breaststroke SB14 |
European Championships
| Bronze medal – third place | 2014 Eindhoven | Women's 100m breaststroke SB14 |

Nicole Lough (born 1995) is a former British Paralympic swimmer who competed at international level events. She swam mainly breaststroke swimming events and was a World and European bronze medalist.
