= 2014 IPC Swimming European Championships – Women's 50 metre butterfly =

The Women’s 50 metre butterfly at the 2014 IPC Swimming European Championships was held at the Pieter van den Hoogenband Swimming Stadium, in Eindhoven from 4–10 August.

== Medalists ==
Event	Gold		Silver		Bronze	
S6	Sarah Louise Rung; Norway	42.43	Teresa Perales; Spain	46.88	Réka Kézdi; Hungary	48.07
S6	Oksana Khrul; Ukraine	38.25	Olena Fedota; Ukraine	39.01	Anastasia Diodorova; Russia	39.03
S7	Susannah Rodgers; Great Britain	36.58	Oxana Guseva; Russia	41.26	Denise Grahl; Germany	45.77

== See also ==
- List of IPC world records in swimming
