= Jonas Larsen =

Danish Paralympic swimmer (born 1992)

Personal information
- Born: 11 March 1992 (age 34)

Sport
- Country: Denmark
- Sport: Paralympic swimming
- Disability: Proximal femoral focal deficiency
Medal record
Paralympic Games
Bronze medal – third place	2016 Rio de Janeiro	150 m medley SM4
World Championships
Bronze medal – third place	2013 Montreal	150 m medley SM4
European Championships
Gold medal – first place	2014 Eindhoven	150 m medley SM4
Silver medal – second place	2016 Funchal	150 m medley SM4
Bronze medal – third place	2016 Funchal	50 m backstroke S5

Jonas Larsen (born 11 March 1992) is a Danish Paralympic swimmer. He represented Denmark at the 2012 Summer Paralympics and at the 2016 Summer Paralympics and he won the bronze medal in the men's 150 metre individual medley SM4 event in 2016.

At the 2013 World Championships held in Montreal, Quebec, Canada, he won the bronze medal in the men's 150 metre medley SM4 event.

At the 2014 European Championships held in Eindhoven, Netherlands, he won the gold medal in the men's 150 metre individual medley SM4 event. Two years later, at the 2016 European Championships held in Funchal, Madeira, he won two medals: the silver medal in the men's 150 metre individual medley SM4 event and the bronze medal in the men's 50 metre backstroke S5 event.
