= 2014 IPC Swimming European Championships – Men's 50 metre backstroke =

The Men’s 50 metre backstroke at the 2014 IPC Swimming European Championships was held at the Pieter van den Hoogenband Swimming Stadium, in Eindhoven from 4–10 August.

== Medalists ==
Event	Gold		Silver		Bronze	
S1	Hennadii Boiko; Ukraine	1:07.24	Anton Kol; Ukraine	1:16.87	Christos Tampaxis; Greece	1:23.20
S2	Serhii Palamarchuk; Ukraine	1:00.83	Dmitrii Kokarev; Russia	1:01.80	Aristeidis Makrodimitris; Greece	1:01.83
S3	Dmytro Vynohradets; Ukraine	49.19	Miguel Ángel Martínez; Spain	52.45	Mikael Fredriksson; Sweden	1:00.04
S4	Arnost Petracek; Czech Republic	48.65	Aleksei Lyzhikhin; Russia	50.33	Nelson Lopes; Portugal	53.34
S5	Andrew Mullen; Great Britain	37.56 ER	Zsolt Vereczkei; Hungary	40.17	Roman Zhdanov; Russia	41.27

== See also ==
- List of IPC world records in swimming
