= 2014 IPC Swimming European Championships – Men's 50 metre butterfly =

The Men's 50 metre butterfly at the 2014 IPC Swimming European Championships was held at the Pieter van den Hoogenband Swimming Stadium, in Eindhoven from 4–10 August.

== Medalists ==
Event	Gold		Silver		Bronze	
S5	Andrew Mullen; Great Britain	37.66 ER	Beytullah Eroglu; Turkey	38.18	Andrea Castagneto; Italy	40.76
S6	Sascha Kindred; Great Britain	32.71	Sergey Klyagin; Russia	33.41	Sebastian Iwanow; Germany	36.71
S7	Yevheniy Bohodayko; Ukraine	30.13	Andriy Kozlenko; Ukraine	33.04	Valerio Taras; Italy	33.76

== See also ==
- List of IPC world records in swimming
