= Susie Rodgers =

British Paralympic swimmer

Susie Rodgers MBE
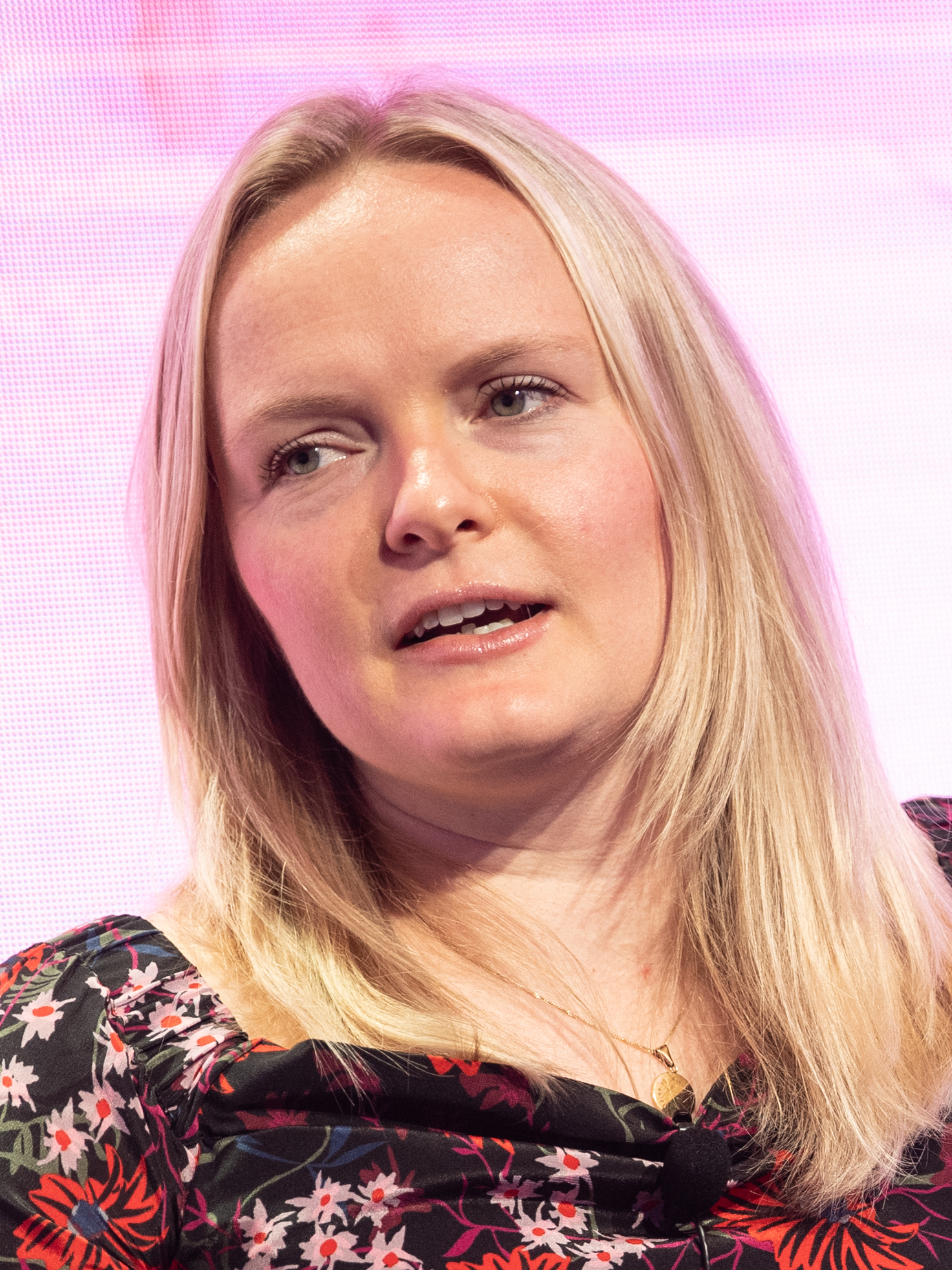
- Rodgers during the WEF 2019

Personal information
- Full name: Susannah Elizabeth Joy Rodgers
- Nationality: British (English)
- Born: 9 August 1983 (age 42) Stockton-on-Tees, England
- Website: https://www.susannahrodgers.com

Sport
- Sport: Swimming
Medal record
Women's para swimming
Representing Great Britain
Paralympic Games
Gold medal – first place	2016 Rio de Janeiro	50 m butterfly S7
Bronze medal – third place	2016 Rio de Janeiro	400m freestyle S7
Bronze medal – third place	2016 Rio de Janeiro	50m freestyle S7
Bronze medal – third place	2012 London	100 m freestyle
Bronze medal – third place	2012 London	400 m freestyle
Bronze medal – third place	2012 London	4×100 m freestyle relay
World Championships
Gold medal – first place	2013 Montreal	4x100 m freestyle relay 34pts
Gold medal – first place	2015 Glasgow	4x100m medley relay 34pts
Silver medal – second place	2013 Montreal	50 m freestyle S7
Silver medal – second place	2013 Montreal	100 m freestyle S7
Silver medal – second place	2013 Montreal	400 m freestyle S7
Silver medal – second place	2013 Montreal	50 m butterfly S7
Bronze medal – third place	2015 Glasgow	100 m freestyle S7
European Championships
Gold medal – first place	2011 Berlin	100 m freestyle S7
Gold medal – first place	2011 Berlin	50 m butterfly S7
Gold medal – first place	2011 Berlin	100 m backstroke S7
Gold medal – first place	2011 Berlin	400 m freestyle S7
Gold medal – first place	2011 Berlin	100m freestyle relay 34pts
Silver medal – second place	2011 Berlin	50 m freestyle S7
Gold medal – first place	2014 Eindhoven	50 m freestyle S7
Gold medal – first place	2014 Eindhoven	100 m freestyle S7
Gold medal – first place	2014 Eindhoven	400 m freestyle S7
Gold medal – first place	2014 Eindhoven	50 m butterfly S7
Gold medal – first place	2014 Eindhoven	100m freestyle relay 34pts
Gold medal – first place	2016 Funchal	50 m freestyle S7
Gold medal – first place	2016 Funchal	100 m freestyle S7
Gold medal – first place	2016 Funchal	400 m freestyle S7
Gold medal – first place	2016 Funchal	50 m butterfly S7
Gold medal – first place	2016 Funchal	100m medley relay 34pts

Susannah Elizabeth Joy Rodgers, MBE (born 9 August 1983) is a British Paralympic swimmer. She competes in S7 classification events and won three bronze medals at the 2012 Summer Paralympics and a gold at the 2016 Summer Paralympics.

== Personal life ==
Rodgers was born on 9 August 1983 in Stockton-on-Tees, England. She was born without a fully formed arm or leg on the left side of her body. Susie was announced as a Young Global Leader by the World Economic Forum in 2018, a year after her retirement from professional sport in 2017.

She graduated with a Bachelor of Arts (BA) degree in modern languages from the University of Newcastle and is able to speak Catalan, French, German, Italian, and Spanish. She combined her swimming career with a job as a project manager for the British Council. She is a qualified non-executive director through the Financial Times NED programme, amongst other roles.

== Swimming ==
Rodgers first learned to swim when living in Egypt as a child but did not take up competitive swimming until she was inspired by watching the British team at the 2008 Summer Paralympics. She competes in the S7 Paralympic classification for swimmers with a physical impairment.

Her first appearance at an international event came at the 2011 IPC European Championships held in Berlin, Germany. At the meet Rodgers won six medals, five gold and one silver. She won individual gold in the 400 metres freestyle, in a new European record time, and relay gold in the 34pt 4×100 m freestyle alongside Louise Watkin, Lauren Steadman and Claire Cashmore. Her second individual gold medal came in the 100 metres backstroke as she set a time of 1:26.09, a new British record, to beat German world record holder Kirsten Bruhn into second place. She won her fourth gold medal by setting a new European record time of 36.74 seconds in the 50 metres butterfly, and followed it with her fifth in the 100 metres freestyle. She also won a silver medal in the 50 metres freestyle.

She was selected to compete for Great Britain at the 2012 Summer Paralympics in London, United Kingdom, as part of a 44-swimmer squad. At the Games she competed in the 50, 100 and 400 freestyle, the 50 meters butterfly, the 100 metres backstroke and the 4×100 m freestyle relay. Rodgers won bronze medals in the 100 metres freestyle and the relay, alongside Cashmore, Watkin and Stephanie Millward. She completed a hat trick of bronze medals by finishing third in the 400 metres freestyle, setting new European records in both the heats and the final, to win Great Britain's one hundredth medal of the Games. She also achieved finishes of fourth in the butterfly and sixth in the backstroke.

In 2013 Rodgers was selected to represent Great Britain again, this time at the IPC Swimming World Championships in Montreal. In her three individual freestyle events; the 50 m S7, 100 m S7 and the 400 m S7 she was beaten into silver on each occasion by American Cortney Jordan. In her only butterfly event, the 50 m S7, she again took second place, this time losing the top podium place to Canada's Brianna Nelson. Rodgers left Canada with one more medal, taking the gold in the 4x100 m freestyle relay (34 points) alongside Stephanie Millward, Claire Cashmore and Amy Marren. The second and third places in the 100m relay went to Canada and the US, those teams contained both Nelson and Jordan.

At the 2016 Rio Paralympics, Rodgers won gold in the women's 50m butterfly S7, and a bronze in both the women's 400m freestyle S7 and women's 50m freestyle S7

She was appointed Member of the Order of the British Empire (MBE) in the 2017 New Year Honours for services to swimming. In 2012, she was granted the Freedom of the City of London having been nominated by the Honorary President of the Guild of Young Freemen, Sir David Wootton of which she was a member and Mark Boleat.
