= 2014 IPC Swimming European Championships – Women's 4 × 100 metre medley relay =

The Women's 100 metre x 4 medley at the 2014 IPC Swimming European Championships was held at the Pieter van den Hoogenband Swimming Stadium, in Eindhoven from 4–10 August.

As with other disability medley events, the freestyle works on a points system whereby the classification numbers of each swimmer are totaled to give a number no higher than 34.

== Medalists ==
Event	Gold		Silver		Bronze	
34pts	Stephanie Millward (S9); Claire Cashmore (SB8); Stephanie Slater (S8); Amy Marren (S9); Great Britain	4:46.89	Valeriia Kukanova (S9); Olesya Vladykina (SB8); Nina Ryabova (S10); Oxana Guseva (S7); Russia	5:07.05	Julia Castello Farre (S6); Sarai Gascon (SB9); Isabel Yingüa Hernández (S10); Nuria Marques Soto (S9); Spain	5:08.89

== See also ==
- List of IPC world records in swimming
