= 2014 IPC Swimming European Championships – Men's 50 metre breaststroke =

The Men's 50 metre breaststroke at the 2014 IPC Swimming European Championships was held at the Pieter van den Hoogenband Swimming Stadium, in Eindhoven from 4–10 August.

== Medalists ==
Event	Gold		Silver		Bronze	
SB3	Miguel Luque; Spain	50.54	Michael Schoenmaker; Netherlands	51.98	Vasilis Tsagkaris; Greece	52.71

== See also ==
- List of IPC world records in swimming
