= 2014 IPC Swimming European Championships – Women's 100 metre butterfly =

The Women’s 100 metre butterfly at the 2014 IPC Swimming European Championships was held at the Pieter van den Hoogenband Swimming Stadium, in Eindhoven from 4–10 August.

== Medalists ==
Event	Gold		Silver		Bronze	
S8	Stephanie Slater; Great Britain	1:08.20 WR	Kateryna Istomina; Ukraine	1:09.09	Amalie Vinther; Denmark	1:19.36
S9	Sarai Gascon; Spain	1:10.47	Amy Marren; Great Britain	1:11.09	Stephanie Millward; Great Britain	1:12.17
S10	Oliwia Jabłońska; Poland	1:07.90 ER	Nina Ryabova; Russia	1:09.91	Luca Sós; Hungary	1:10.10
S12	Darya Stukalova; Russia	1:05.13	Hannah Russell; Great Britain	1:09.91	María Delgado; Spain	1:11.13

== See also ==
- List of IPC world records in swimming
