= 2014 IPC Swimming European Championships – Women's 50 metre backstroke =

The Women’s 50 metre backstroke at the 2014 IPC Swimming European Championships was held at the Pieter van den Hoogenband Swimming Stadium, in Eindhoven from 4–10 August.

== Medalists ==
Event	Gold		Silver		Bronze	
S2	Ganna Ielisavetska; Ukraine	1:04.38	Alexandra Agafonova; Russia	1:07.49	Iryna Sotska; Ukraine	1:07.78
S4	Lisette Teunissen; Netherlands	51.91	Maryna Verbova; Ukraine	55.47	Mariia Lafina; Ukraine	1:00.37
S5	Teresa Perales; Spain	43.87	Sarah Louise Rung; Norway	46.50	Anita Fatis; France	49.84

== See also ==
- List of IPC world records in swimming
