= 2014 IPC Swimming European Championships – Men's 4 × 100 metre freestyle relay =

The Men's 100 metre x 4 freestyle at the 2014 IPC Swimming European Championships was held at the Pieter van den Hoogenband Swimming Stadium, in Eindhoven from 4–10 August.

As with other disability relay events, the freestyle works on a points system whereby the classification numbers of each swimmer are totaled to give a number no higher than 34.

== Medalists ==
Event	Gold		Silver		Bronze	
34pts	Alexander Demyanenko (S9); Alexander Skaliukh (S9); Konstantin Lisenkov (S8); Denis Tarasov (S8); Russia	3:52.16	Dmytro Vanzenko (S10); Marian Kvasnytsia (S7); Denys Dubrov (S10); Yevheniy Bohodayko (S7); Ukraine	4:00.20	Sascha Kindred (S6); Robert Welbourn (S10); James Hollis(S10); Josef Craig (S8); Great Britain	4:02.41

== See also ==
- List of IPC world records in swimming
