= Alexander Skaliukh =

Russian Paralympic swimmer

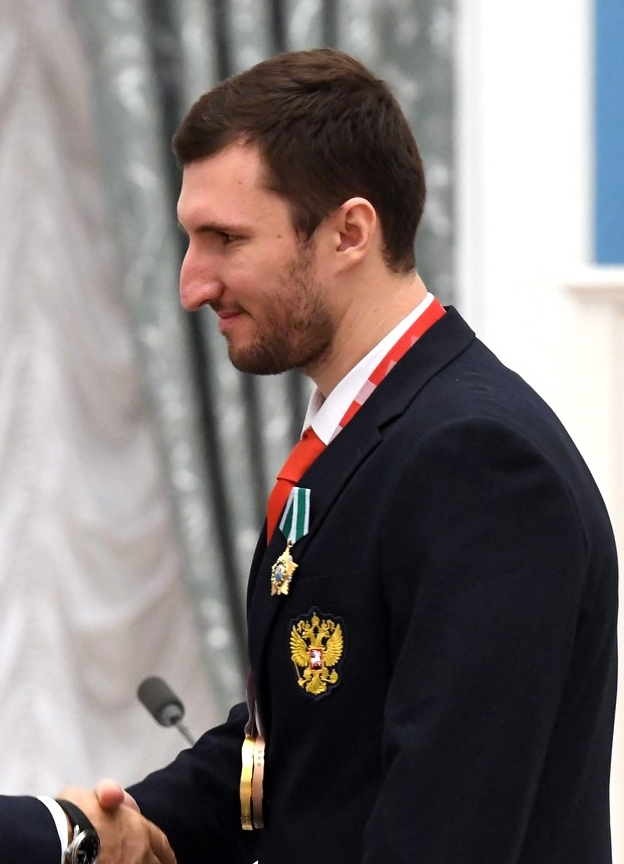
- Skaliukh in 2021

Personal information
- Nationality: Russian
- Born: 15 June 1994 (age 32) Taganrog, Russia

Sport
- Sport: Paralympic swimming
- Disability class: S9
- Club: Rostov Regional Centre of Olympic Preparation No.1
- Coached by: Alexei Polyakov
Medal record
Representing RPC
Paralympic Games
Gold medal – first place	2020 Tokyo	4×100 m medley relay
Bronze medal – third place	2020 Tokyo	100 m butterfly S9
Representing Russia
World Championships
Gold medal – first place	2015 Glasgow	50 m freestyle S9
Gold medal – first place	2015 Glasgow	100 m freestyle S9
Gold medal – first place	2015 Glasgow	100 m butterfly S9
Gold medal – first place	2015 Glasgow	4×100 m freestyle relay
Gold medal – first place	2019 London	4×100 m medley relay
Silver medal – second place	2013 Montreal	4×100 m medley relay
Bronze medal – third place	2019 London	100 m butterfly S9
European Championships
Gold medal – first place	2014 Eindhoven	4×100 m freestyle relay
Gold medal – first place	2014 Eindhoven	4×100 m medley relay
Gold medal – first place	2016 Funchal	4×100 m freestyle relay
Silver medal – second place	2014 Eindhoven	100 m butterfly S9
Bronze medal – third place	2014 Eindhoven	50 m freestyle S9

Alexander Petrovich Skaliukh (Russian: Александр Петрович Скалиух; born 15 June 1994) is a Russian Paralympic swimmer. He represented Russian Paralympic Committee athletes at the 2020 Summer Paralympics.

== Paralympics ==
Skaliukh represented Russian Paralympic Committee athletes at the 2020 Summer Paralympics and won a gold medal in the men's 4 × 100 m medley relay and a bronze medal in the 100 metre butterfly S9 event.
