= 2014 IPC Swimming European Championships – Women's 50 metre breaststroke =

The Women’s 50 metre breaststroke at the 2014 IPC Swimming European Championships was held at the Pieter van den Hoogenband Swimming Stadium, in Eindhoven from 4–10 August.

== Medalists ==
Event	Gold		Silver		Bronze	
SB2	Jennie Ekström; Sweden	1:11.47 WR	Iuliia Shishova; Russia	1:16.32	Cecilie Kristiansen; Denmark	1:28.07
SB3	Irina Kolmogorova; Russia	1:05.71	Natalia Gavrilyuk; Russia	1:07.03	Mariia Lafina; Ukraine	1:08.35

== See also ==
- List of IPC world records in swimming
