= 2014 IPC Swimming European Championships – Women's 200 metre freestyle =

The Women’s 200 metre freestyle at the 2014 IPC Swimming European Championships was held at the Pieter van den Hoogenband Swimming Stadium in Eindhoven from 4–10 August.

== Medalists ==
Event	Gold		Silver		Bronze	
S4	Arjola Trimi; Italy	3:25.00	Lisette Teunissen; Netherlands	3:30.25	Mariia Lafina; Ukraine	3:51.99
S5	Sarah Louise Rung; Norway	2:53.75	Inbal Pezaro; Israel	2:59.84	Katalin Engelhardt; Hungary	3:32.45
S14	Valeriia Shabalina; Russia	2:06.76	Jessica-Jane Applegate; Great Britain	2:08.36	Chloe Davies; Great Britain	2:12.36

== See also ==
- List of IPC world records in swimming
