= Daria Pikalova =

Russian Paralympic swimmer

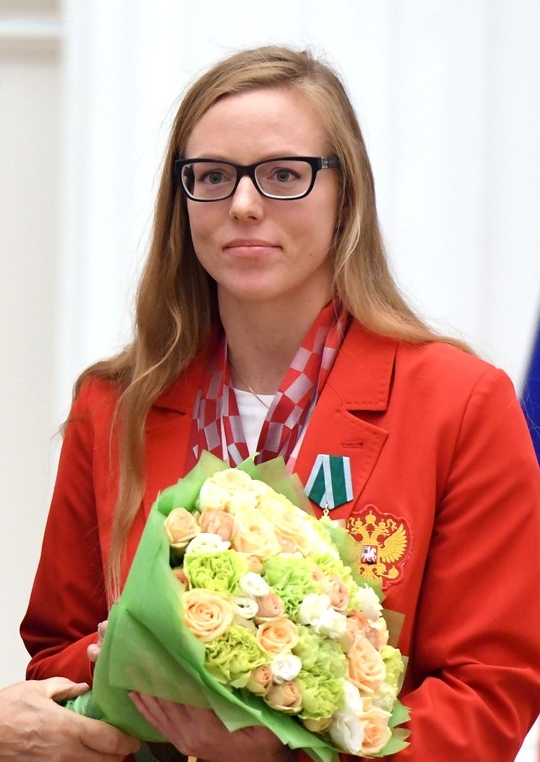

Personal information
- Full name: Daria Sergeyevna Pikalova
- Born: Daria Sergeyevna Stukalova; 22 August 1994 (age 31)

Sport
- Sport: Swimming
Medal record
Women's swimming
Representing RPC
Paralympic Games
Gold medal – first place	2020 Tokyo	mixed 4×100 m freestyle relay 49pts
Silver medal – second place	2020 Tokyo	100 m backstroke S12
Silver medal – second place	2020 Tokyo	100 m freestyle S12
Bronze medal – third place	2020 Tokyo	100 m butterfly S13
Representing Russia
Paralympic Games
Silver medal – second place	2012 London	100m butterfly SM12
Bronze medal – third place	2012 London	50m freestyle S12
Bronze medal – third place	2012 London	100m freestyle S12
Bronze medal – third place	2012 London	200m medley SM12
IPC World Championships
Gold medal – first place	2013 Montreal	50m freestyle S12
Gold medal – first place	2013 Montreal	100m freestyle S12
Gold medal – first place	2013 Montreal	100m butterfly S12
Gold medal – first place	2013 Montreal	200m medley SM12
Gold medal – first place	2013 Montreal	400m freestyle S12
Gold medal – first place	2015 Glasgow	100m backstroke S12
Gold medal – first place	2015 Glasgow	100m butterfly S13
Silver medal – second place	2013 Montreal	100m backstroke S12
Silver medal – second place	2015 Glasgow	200m medley S12
Silver medal – second place	2015 Glasgow	50 m freestyle S12
IPC European Championships
Gold medal – first place	2014 Eindhoven	50m freestyle S12
Gold medal – first place	2014 Eindhoven	100m freestyle S12
Gold medal – first place	2014 Eindhoven	400m freestyle S12
Gold medal – first place	2014 Eindhoven	100m butterfly S12
Gold medal – first place	2014 Eindhoven	200m medley S12
Gold medal – first place	2014 Eindhoven	100m backstroke S12
Gold medal – first place	2016 Funchal	50 m freestyle S12
Gold medal – first place	2016 Funchal	100 m butterfly S13
Silver medal – second place	2016 Funchal	100 m freestyle S13
Silver medal – second place	2016 Funchal	100 m backstroke S12

Darya Sergeyevna Pikalova (Russian: Да́рья Серге́евна Пика́лова, née Stukalova; born 22 August 1994) is a Russian Paralympic swimmer. Her husband Alexander Pikalov is also a paralympic swimmer.

== Career ==
She won a silver medal and three bronze medals on her debut Paralympic appearance representing Russia at the 2012 Summer Paralympics. She won five gold medals and a silver medal at the 2013 IPC Swimming World Championships in Montreal.

She also represented Russian Paralympic Committee athletes at the 2020 Summer Paralympics and claimed bronze medal in the women's butterfly S13 event at the 2020 Summer Paralympics.
