= Sebastián Rodríguez Veloso =

Spanish Paralympic swimmer (born 1957)

Sebastián Rodríguez
Personal information
- Full name: Sebastián Rodríguez Veloso
- Nationality: Spanish
- Born: 27 February 1957 (age 69) Cádiz, Andalusia, Spain

Sport
- Sport: Swimming
- Strokes: Freestyle
Medal record
Men's swimming
Representing Spain
Paralympic Games
Gold medal – first place	2000 Sydney	50 m freestyle S5
Gold medal – first place	2000 Sydney	100 m freestyle S5
Gold medal – first place	2000 Sydney	200 m freestyle S5
Gold medal – first place	2000 Sydney	4×50 m freestyle 20 pts
Gold medal – first place	2000 Sydney	4×50 m medley 20 pts
Gold medal – first place	2004 Athens	50 m freestyle S5
Gold medal – first place	2004 Athens	100 m freestyle S5
Gold medal – first place	2004 Athens	200 m freestyle S5
Silver medal – second place	2008 Beijing	200 m freestyle S5
Silver medal – second place	2008 Beijing	4×50 m freestyle 20 pts
Silver medal – second place	2012 London	50 m freestyle S5
Bronze medal – third place	2008 Beijing	50 m freestyle S5
Bronze medal – third place	2008 Beijing	4×50 m medley 20 pts
Bronze medal – third place	2012 London	100 m freestyle S5
Bronze medal – third place	2012 London	200 m freestyle S5
IPC World Championships
Gold medal – first place	2015 Glasgow	Men's 50m freestyle S5
IPC European Championships
Gold medal – first place	2009 Reykjavik	50 m freestyle S5
Gold medal – first place	2009 Reykjavik	100 m freestyle S5
Gold medal – first place	2009 Reykjavik	4x50m medley relay 20pts
Gold medal – first place	2014 Eindhoven	Men's 50m freestyle S5
Gold medal – first place	2014 Eindhoven	Men's 100m freestyle S5
Gold medal – first place	2014 Eindhoven	Men's 200m freestyle S5
Gold medal – first place	2014 Eindhoven	4x50m mixed freestyle relay 20pts
Bronze medal – third place	2016 Funchal	100m freestyle S5
Bronze medal – third place	2016 Funchal	200m freestyle S5
Bronze medal – third place	2016 Funchal	Mixed 50m medley relay 20pts

Sebastián Rodríguez Veloso (Spanish pronunciation: [seβasˈtjan roˈðɾiɣeθ]; born 27 February 1957) is a Spanish Paralympic swimmer. He has competed at four Paralympic Games, winning fifteen medals: eight gold, four silver and three bronze. His attendance at the Games was controversial after it was revealed that he had been jailed for bomb attacks while a member of First of October Anti-Fascist Resistance Groups (GRAPO).

== Early life and criminal activities ==
Rodríguez was born in Cádiz, Andalusia, Spain on 27 February 1957. He is nicknamed Chano.

In the 1980s he was a member of the Spanish terrorist organisation First of October Anti-Fascist Resistance Groups (Spanish: Grupos de Resistencia Antifascista Primero de Octubre, GRAPO). In 1984, at the age of 26, he was jailed for 84 years for his role in the murder of Seville business leader Rafael Padura and a series of bomb attacks.

In 1990 while in prison he went on hunger strike for 432 days, leaving his health permanently damaged and resulting in him losing the use of his legs. He was released on parole from prison in 1994 under a Spanish law which says that the seriously ill should not be jailed, and in 2007 he was pardoned by the Spanish Government.

== Swimming ==
Rodríguez is an S5 swimmer. In his swimming career, he has earned over 20 medals. His training base is Vigo.

In 2010, Rodríguez competed at the Tenerife International Open. Rodríguez competed at the 2010 Adapted Swimming World Championship in the Netherlands. Ahead of the competition, he attended a swimming camp with the national team that was part of the Paralympic High Performance Program (HARP Program). He competed at the 2011 IPC European Swimming Championships in Berlin, Germany. He earned a gold medal. He almost finished first in the 4x50 meter freestyle relay with teammates Richard Oribe, Alvaro Bayona and Jordi Gordillo but a bad touch led to disqualification. He competed at the 2013 IPC Swimming World Championships.

=== Paralympics ===
Rodríguez first competed at the Paralympics at the 2000 Sydney Games. He took part having told Spanish officials that he lost his legs in a traffic accident, but in reality he had lost the use of his legs while in prison. He won five gold medals at the Games and set four new world records. Three of his golds came in individual freestyle events in the S5 classification, as he set world records in the 50 metres, 100 metres and 200 metres. He also won gold medals as part of the Spanish relay teams in the 4×50 m freestyle 20 pts and the 4×50 m medley 20 pts, setting a new world record in the freestyle relay. The truth about how he came to be disabled was revealed by a Spanish newspaper during the Games, which led to calls for him to return his medals; however, his participation was backed by politicians from his home town.

At the 2004 Summer Paralympics held in Athens, Greece, Rodriguez won a further three gold medals. He successfully defended his titles in the 50 m, 100 m and 200 m freestyle events, setting new world records in the final of each event.

In 2008 he competed in his third Paralympics at the Beijing Games in China. Rodríguez won four medals: silvers in the 200 m freestyle and the 4×50 m freestyle 20 pts, and bronze medals in the 50 m freestyle and the 4×50 m medley relay 20 pts.

His fourth Paralympic appearance came at the 2012 Games in London, United Kingdom. He won three medals at the Games; silvers in the 50 m freestyle and 200 m freestyle, and a bronze in the 100 m.
