= Sascha Kindred =

British Paralympic swimmer

Personal information
- Nationality: British
- Born: 13 December 1977 (age 48) Münster, West Germany
- Height: 1.88 m (6 ft 2 in)
- Website: SaschaKindred.co.uk

Sport
- Sport: Swimming
- Club: Leominster Kingfisher
Medal record
Men's para swimming
Representing Great Britain
Event	1st	2nd	3rd
Paralympic Games	7	3	3
World Championships	8	3	5
European Championships	4	1	1
Total	19	7	9
Paralympic Games
Gold medal – first place	2000 Sydney	200 m medley SM6
Gold medal – first place	2000 Sydney	100 m breaststroke SB7
Gold medal – first place	2004 Athens	200 m ind. medley SM6
Gold medal – first place	2004 Athens	100 m breaststroke SB7
Gold medal – first place	2008 Beijing	200 m ind. medley SM6
Gold medal – first place	2008 Beijing	100 m breaststroke SB7
Gold medal – first place	2016 Rio	200 m ind. medley SM6
Silver medal – second place	1996 Atlanta	100 m breaststroke SB7
Silver medal – second place	2000 Sydney	4×100 m medley 34 pts
Silver medal – second place	2012 London	200 m ind. medley SM6
Bronze medal – third place	2000 Sydney	4×50 m freestyle 20 pts
Bronze medal – third place	2004 Athens	4×50 m freestyle 20 pts
Bronze medal – third place	2008 Beijing	50 m butterfly S6
World Championships
Gold medal – first place	2002 Mar del Plata	100 m medley SB7
Gold medal – first place	2002 Mar del Plata	200 m medley SM6
Gold medal – first place	2002 Mar del Plata	4x100 m medley relay 34pts
Gold medal – first place	2006 Durban	100 m medley SB7
Gold medal – first place	2006 Durban	200 m medley SM6
Gold medal – first place	2010 Eindhoven	200 m medley SM6
Gold medal – first place	2013 Montreal	200 m medley SM6
Gold medal – first place	2015 Glasgow	200 m medley SM6
Silver medal – second place	1998 Christchurch	100 m breaststroke SB7
Silver medal – second place	1998 Christchurch	200 m medley SM6
Silver medal – second place	2010 Eindhoven	50 m butterfly S6
Bronze medal – third place	2002 Mar del Plata	4x50 m freestyle relay 20pts
Bronze medal – third place	2006 Durban	4x50 m medley relay 20pts
Bronze medal – third place	2006 Durban	50 m butterfly S6
Bronze medal – third place	2013 Montreal	100 m medley SB7
Bronze medal – third place	2015 Glasgow	50 m butterfly S6
European Championships
Gold medal – first place	2009 Reykjavik	100 m backstroke – SB7
Gold medal – first place	2009 Reykjavik	50 m butterfly – S6
Gold medal – first place	2009 Reykjavik	200 m ind. medley – SM6
Gold medal – first place	2014 Eindhoven	50m butterfly S6
Silver medal – second place	2009 Reykjavik	4x50m medley relay 20pts
Bronze medal – third place	2014 Eindhoven	4x100m freestyle relay 34pts

Sascha Kindred (born 13 December 1977 in Münster, Germany) is a British swimmer who has competed in six Summer Paralympic Games, winning thirteen medals.

== Early life ==
Born in Germany, Kindred moved to Britain at the age of 3. He began swimming for a club at the age of 11. He attended Mossley Hollins High School and Kaskenmoor secondary school for a short period of time before going into training at local swimming clubs such as Oldham.

Kindred has cerebral palsy, which affects the right side of his body. He competes in the S6 (butterfly), SM6 (medley) and SB7 (breaststroke) classifications.

== Paralympic career ==
Sascha is one of the most successful Paralympic athletes ever, taking part in 6 Paralympic Games.

Kindred first competed at the Paralympic Games in Atlanta 1996 and won a silver medal in the 100 m breaststroke SB7. In May 2016 it has been announced that he will be representing Great Britain once more, and for the 6th time, in the Paralympic Games in Rio later in the year.

At the 2000 games in Sydney, Kindred won two gold medals, a silver, and a bronze. He described the games as his biggest sporting achievement so far.

In the 2004 Athens Paralympics, Kindred won two gold medals, successfully defending the 100 m breaststroke SB7 and 200 m individual medley SM6 titles he had won in Sydney. He also won a bronze medal in the 4×50 m freestyle 20 pts.

Kindred won his fifth Paralympic gold in the 200 m individual medley SM6 at the 2008 Games in Beijing, where he set a new world record time of 2:49.19 and earned the title for the third consecutive year. He then won a second gold of the games, six titles overall, and set another world record of 1:22.18 in the 100 m breaststroke SB7. The third medal he won was a bronze in the 50 m butterfly S6. He went on to his fifth Paralympic Games in London where he won a silver medal in the 200m IM in a time of 2:41.50

In addition to his success in the Paralympics, Kindred has won 19 medals (9 gold) at IPC World Championships, 24 medals (9 gold) at European Championships, and a gold medal at the 2006 Paralympic World Cup in Manchester.

== Personal life ==
Kindred's wife is fellow British Paralympic gold medal-winning swimmer Nyree Lewis. Together the pair, who live in Herefordshire, are known as the "golden couple" of British disability swimming.

He includes amongst his sporting heroes Eric Cantona, Michael Johnson and Carl Lewis, and is a supporter of Manchester United.

Kindred was appointed Officer of the Order of the British Empire (OBE) in the 2009 New Year Honours and Commander of the Order of the British Empire (CBE) in the 2017 New Year Honours for services to swimming.

Kindred received an Honorary Doctorate of Laws from the University of Bath in May 2017.

== See also ==
- Great Britain at the 2008 Summer Paralympics
- List of Paralympic records in swimming
- Swimming at the 2008 Summer Paralympics
- Swimming at the 2004 Summer Paralympics
- Swimming at the 2000 Summer Paralympics
- Swimming at the 1996 Summer Paralympics
