= Andrew Mullen =

British Paralympic swimmer

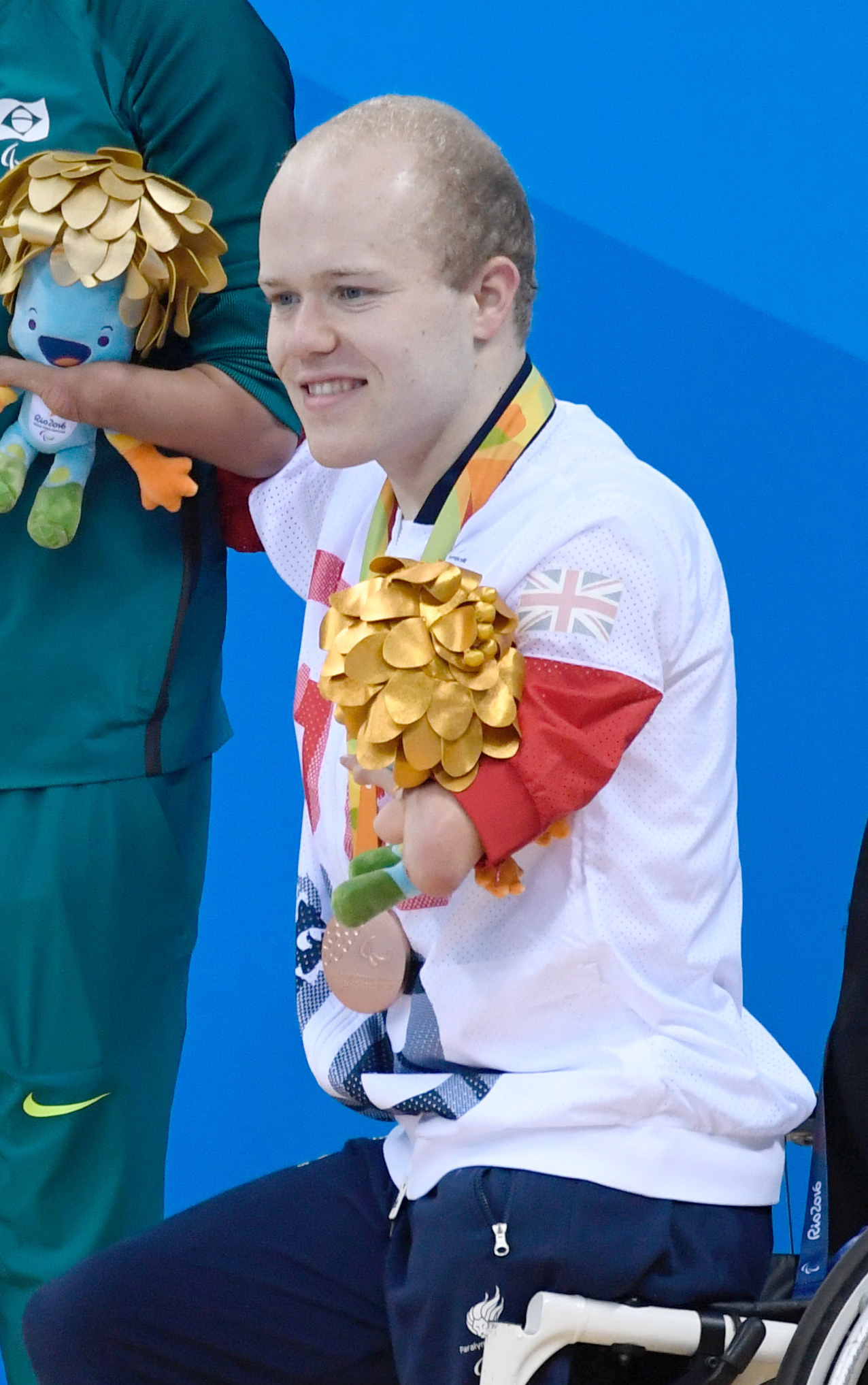
- Mullen at the 2016 Paralympics

Personal information
- Full name: Andrew Euan Mullen
- Born: 29 November 1996 (age 29) Glasgow, Scotland

Sport
- Sport: Swimming
- Strokes: Freestyle, Backstroke, Butterfly
- Club: City of Glasgow Swim Team
- Coach: Ian Wright
Medal record
Men's para swimming
Representing Great Britain
Paralympic Games
Silver medal – second place	2016 Rio de Janeiro	50m backstroke S5
Bronze medal – third place	2016 Rio de Janeiro	100 m freestyle S5
Bronze medal – third place	2016 Rio de Janeiro	200 m freestyle S5
World Championships
Silver medal – second place	2013 Montreal	50 m backstroke S5
Silver medal – second place	2013 Montreal	200 m individual medley SM5
Silver medal – second place	2015 Glasgow	50 m backstroke S5
Silver medal – second place	2015 Glasgow	200 m freestyle S5
Bronze medal – third place	2013 Montreal	50 m butterfly S5
Bronze medal – third place	2015 Glasgow	50 m butterfly S5
Bronze medal – third place	2015 Glasgow	100 m freestyle
European Championships
Gold medal – first place	2014 Eindhoven	200 m individual medley SM5
Gold medal – first place	2014 Eindhoven	50 m butterfly S5
Gold medal – first place	2014 Eindhoven	50 m backstroke S5
Gold medal – first place	2016 Funchal	100 m freestyle S5
Gold medal – first place	2016 Funchal	200 m freestyle S5
Gold medal – first place	2016 Funchal	50 m backstroke S5
Gold medal – first place	2016 Funchal	50 m butterfly – S5
Silver medal – second place	2011 Berlin	50m butterfly S5
Silver medal – second place	2014 Eindhoven	50m freestyle S5
Silver medal – second place	2014 Eindhoven	100 m freestyle S5
Bronze medal – third place	2011 Berlin	200 m individual medley S5

Andrew Mullen (born 29 November 1996) is a British Paralympian swimmer. Mullen competes in the S5 disability category in freestyle, backstroke and butterfly, specialising in sprint events. He competed in the 2012 and 2016 Summer Paralympics and won a silver and two bronze medals in 2016. Earlier in 2013 he won silver and bronze at the World Championships in Montreal.

== Personal history ==
Mullen was born in Glasgow, Scotland in 1996. He was born with a shortened left leg. He was educated at Mearns Castle High School.

== Swimming career ==
Mullen began swimming from a young age, and at the age of seven he became a member of Temple Swimming club. While at Temple he entered meets organized by Scottish Disability Sport, showing promise as a competitive swimmer. At the age of 10, after attending a gala in Dundee, he was approached by Paralympic champion swimmer Kenny Cairns, who believed Mullen had the potential to challenge at the highest level of the sport. Mullen took great inspiration from the meeting, giving him the belief to become a world champion. Mullen increased his training hours after being accepted by local club REN 96. At the age of 12 he was accepted into the Scottish Junior Squad, travelling to Sheffield for further training sessions.

In 2010 Mullen recorded times that saw him accepted into the British Swimming World Class Talent Programme. This led to him entering his first international swimming competition when he was part of the British team to compete at the 2011 IPC Swimming European Championships in Berlin. He entered three events, all in the S5 category, the 100m freestyle, 50m butterfly and 200m individual medley. He took two medals at the games, silver in the butterfly and bronze in the individual medley. In 2012 at the age of 15, he qualified for the Great Britain team for the 2012 Summer Paralympics in London.

At the 2012 Paralympics, Mullen was entered for the 50m freestyle, 50m butterfly and 50m individual medley. In his first event, the 50m freestyle he progressed through the heats, taking the final slot as the eighth fastest qualifier. In the final he finished eighth. His second event the 50m backstroke he again qualified through the heats, this time finishing in second place, and recording the fourth fastest time. The finals saw Mullen finishing fourth, just over half a second behind bronze medalist Zsolt Vereczkei of Hungary. Mullen's final event, the 50m butterfly, he again qualified through his heats only to again finish just outside the medals in fourth position.

Mullen was back in the British team the next year when he travelled to Montreal to compete in the 2013 IPC Swimming World Championships. There he was entered into five events in the S5 category: the 50m Butterfly, 50m Backstroke, 200m Individual Medley, 100m Freestyle and 50m Freestyle. He finished 5th in the 50m freestyle and 4th in the 100m freestyle, but medaled in the other three events. He took silver in the 200m individual medley and 50m backstroke, beaten to first place on both occasions by Brazil's Daniel Dias. In the 50m butterfly he won bronze, again behind Dias (silver) and Roy Perkins (gold).
