= Iaroslav Semenenko =

Ukrainian paralympic swimmer

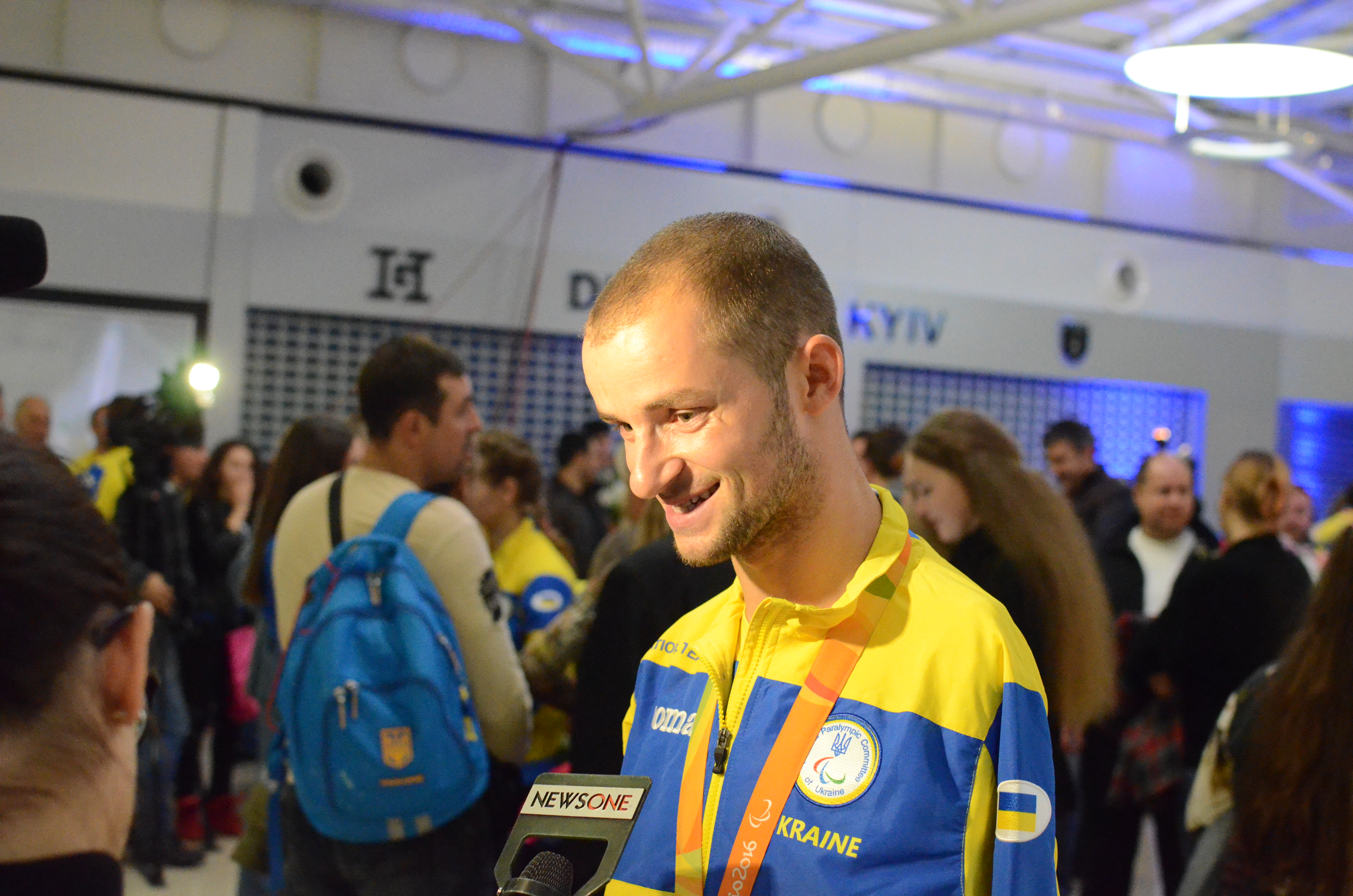
- Semenenko in 2016

Sport
- Country: Ukraine
- Sport: Swimming
Medal record
Paralympic Games
Representing Ukraine
Men's para swimming
Bronze medal – third place	2016 Rio de Janeiro	100 m backstroke S6
Bronze medal – third place	2024 Paris	Mixed 4×50 m medley relay 20pts
World Championships
Silver medal – second place	2010 Eindhoven	4×50 m freestyle 20pts
Silver medal – second place	2010 Eindhoven	4×50 m medley 20pts
Silver medal – second place	2013 Montreal	4 × 50 m freestyle 20pts
Bronze medal – third place	2010 Eindhoven	200 m medley SM6
Bronze medal – third place	2013 Montreal	100 m backstroke S6
Bronze medal – third place	2015 Glasgow	100 m backstroke S6
European Championships
Gold medal – first place	2014 Eindhoven	4×50 m freestyle 20pts
Gold medal – first place	2014 Eindhoven	100 m backstroke S6
Gold medal – first place	2016 Madeira	4×50 m medley 20pts
Gold medal – first place	2024 Madeira	50 m backstroke S5
Silver medal – second place	2009 Reykjavik	100 m breaststroke SB7
Silver medal – second place	2016 Madeira	200 m medley SM6
Silver medal – second place	2026 Kocaeli	50 m backstroke S5
Bronze medal – third place	2026 Kocaeli	4×50 m medley 20pts

Iaroslav Semenenko (Ukrainian: Ярослав Сергійович Семененко; born 4 June 1987) is a Ukrainian paralympic swimmer. He participated at the 2016 Summer Paralympics in the swimming competition, being awarded the bronze medal in the men's 100 metre backstroke S6 event. Semenenko had participated at the 2008 and 2012 Summer Paralympics in the swimming competition without winning a medal. On 13 September 2012, he was awarded the title "Honorary Citizen Of The City Of Slovyansk".
