= Arianna Talamona =

Italian Paralympic swimmer (born 1994)

Personal information
- Born: 5 June 1994 (age 32) Varese, Italy
- Height: 170 cm (5 ft 7 in)

Sport
- Country: Italy
- Sport: Para swimming
- Disability: Strumpell-Lorrain disease
- Disability class: S5
- Club: Polha Varese
- Coached by: Massimiliano Tosin; Micaela Biava
Medal record
Women's Para swimming
Representing Italy
World Championships
Gold medal – first place	2019 London	Women's 50m butterfly S5
Gold medal – first place	2019 London	Women's 200m individual medley SM5
Silver medal – second place	2019 London	Women's 100m freestyle S5
Silver medal – second place	2019 London	Women's 200m freestyle S5
European Championships
Gold medal – first place	2016 Funchal	Women's 200m individual medley SM7
Gold medal – first place	2018 Dublin	Women's 4x50m freestyle relay
Silver medal – second place	2014 Eindhoven	Women's 200m individual medley SM7
Bronze medal – third place	2014 Eindhoven	Women's 400m freestyle S7
Bronze medal – third place	2014 Eindhoven	Women's 100m breaststroke SB6
Bronze medal – third place	2014 Eindhoven	Women's 4x50m medley relay
Bronze medal – third place	2016 Funchal	Women's 100m backstroke S7
Bronze medal – third place	2016 Funchal	Women's 400m freestyle S7

Arianna Talamona (born 5 June 1994 in Varese) is an Italian Para swimmer who competes in international level events.

Talamona was diagnosed with Strumpell-Lorrain disease which affects her spinal cord and uses a wheelchair, she has inherited this medical condition from her mother. Talamona started swimming aged eight to help strengthen her muscles and began competing internationally at the 2011 IPC Swimming European Championships in Berlin where she competed in four events but didn't receive medals.
