= Amy Marren =

British Paralympic swimmer (born 1998)

Amy Marren MBE PLY
Personal information
- Full name: Amy Marren
- Nationality: British (English)
- Born: 14 August 1998 (age 28) Newham, East London, England
- Education: Hall Mead Academy, Upminster, Essex. The Campion School, Hornchurch, Essex.
- Height: 1.63 m (5 ft 4 in)

Sport
- Sport: Swimming
- Strokes: All
- Club: Romford Town Swimming Club
Medal record
Swimming
Representing Great Britain
Bronze medal – third place	2016 Rio de Janeiro	200m Individual Medley SM9
IPC World Championships
Gold medal – first place	2013 Montreal	200m medley SM9
Gold medal – first place	2013 Montreal	100m butterfly S9
Gold medal – first place	2013 Montreal	34 point 4x100m freestyle relay
Gold medal – first place	2013 Montreal	34 point 4x100m IM Relay
Silver medal – second place	2013 Montreal	100m freestyle S9
Silver medal – second place	2013 Montreal	100m backstroke S9
IPC European Championships
Gold medal – first place	2014 Eindhoven	4x100m medley relay 34pts
Gold medal – first place	2014 Eindhoven	200M IM SM9
Silver medal – second place	2014 Eindhoven	50m freestyle S9
Silver medal – second place	2014 Eindhoven	400m freestyle S9
Silver medal – second place	2014 Eindhoven	100m backstroke S9
Silver medal – second place	2014 Eindhoven	100m butterfly S9
Silver medal – second place	2014 Eindhoven	100m Freestyle S9

Amy Marren (born 14 August 1998) is a British para swimmer who became the SM9 200m individual medley world champion at the 2013 IPC Swimming World Championships.

At the same championships, she won gold in the S9 100m butterfly, as well as being a member of the British women’s relay teams that won both the 4x100m freestyle relay and the 4x100m medley relay (breaking the previous world record, also set by GB in 2011, by six seconds).

Marren also won silver medals in the S9 100m backstroke and the S9 100m freestyle, finishing behind British teammate Stephanie Millward.

Marren won a bronze medal in the 200m individual medley at the 2016 Paralympic Games in Rio, after only qualifying for the GB Team by 0.2 seconds.
