= 2014 IPC Swimming European Championships =

European Swimming Competition held in 2014

3rd IPC Swimming European Championships
- Host city: Eindhoven, Netherlands
- Date: 4 – 10 August
- Venue: Pieter van den Hoogenband Swimming Stadium
- Nations: 35
- Athletes: 376

The 2014 IPC Swimming European Championships was an international swimming competition held in Eindhoven, the Netherlands, from the 4th to the 10th of August. Around 375 athletes from 35 different countries attended. The venue, the Pieter van den Hoogenband Swimming Stadium, also held the 2010 IPC Swimming World Championships.

== Venue ==

The Championship was staged at the Pieter van den Hoogenband Swimming Stadium located in the south of Eindhoven. The complex contains three outdoor swimming pools, all renovated shortly before the staging of the competition.

== Coverage ==
As with the 2013 IPC Swimming World Championships, the IPC will continue to show live streaming of the finals on ParalympicSport.TV. In the United Kingdom Channel 4 continued their commitment to parasport with their own live streaming Paralympics website with pool-side commentary and live action shown daily on their sister channel More4.

== Events ==
=== Classification ===
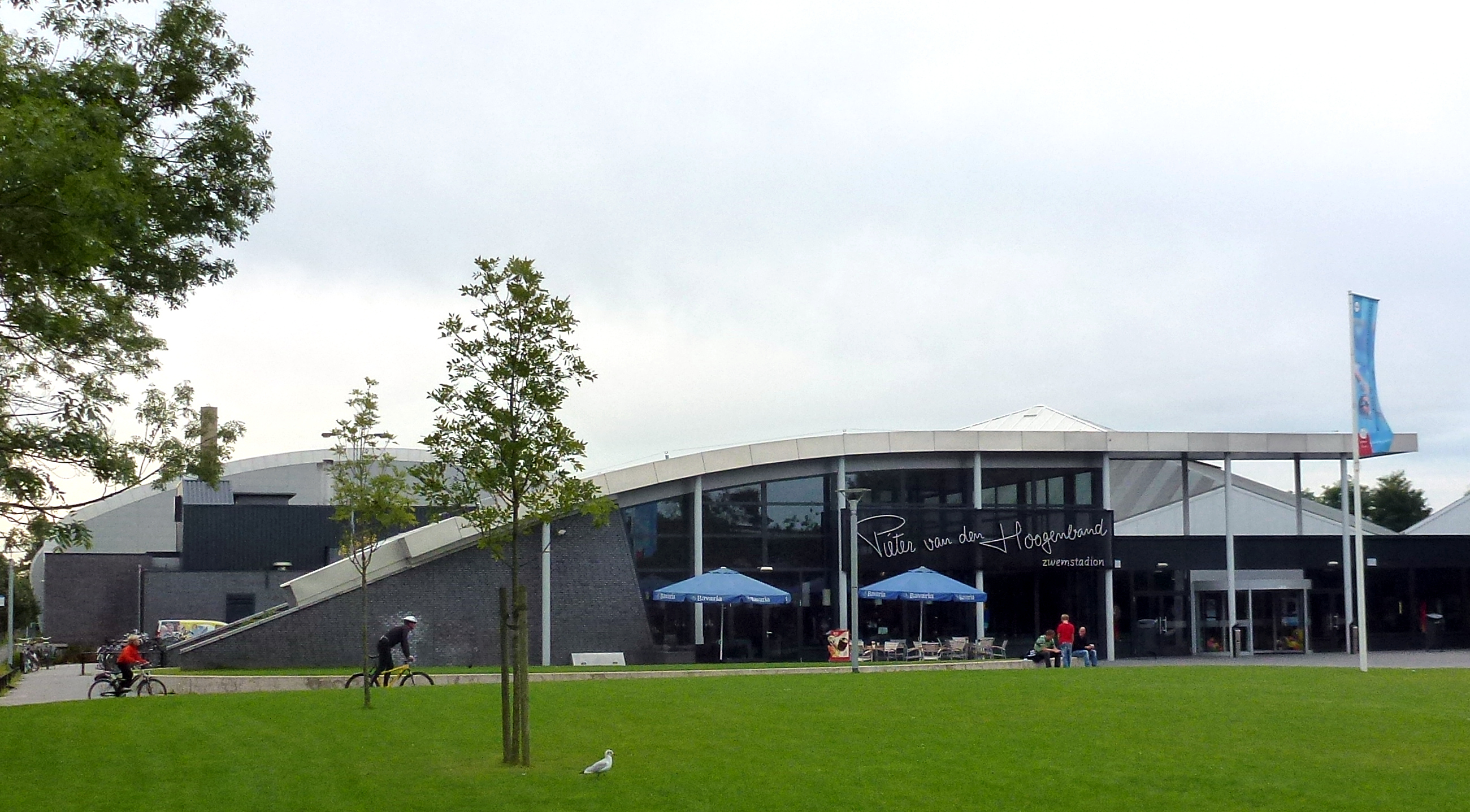
The Pieter van den Hoogenband Zwemstadion in 2012

Athletes are allocated a classification for each event based upon their disability to allow fairer competition between athletes of similar ability. The classifications for swimming are:

- Visual impairment
  - S11-S13
- Intellectual impairment
  - S14
- Other disability
  - S1-S10 (Freestyle, backstroke and butterfly)
  - SB1-SB9 (breaststroke)
  - SM1-SM10 (individual medley)

Classifications run from S1 (severely disabled) to S10 (minimally disabled) for athletes with physical disabilities, and S11 (totally blind) to S13 (legally blind) for visually impaired athletes. Blind athletes must use blackened goggles.

=== Schedule ===
Finals

Date →		4 Aug	5 Aug	6 Aug	7 Aug	8 Aug	9 Aug	10 Aug
50 m Freestyle	Men; Details	S10; S9	S1; S3; S2; S4; S7	S6	S13; S11; S12		S5	S8
50 m Freestyle	Women; Details	S9; S10	S4; S7	S6	S11; S12; S13		S5	S8
100 m freestyle	Men; Details	S1; S2; S3; S4; S5		S9		S7; S6	S11; S13; S8; S12	S10
100 m freestyle	Women; Details	S5; S4		S9		S7; S6	S8; S11; S12; S13	S10
200 m freestyle	Men; Details			S3; S2		S4; S14; S5		
200 m freestyle	Women; Details			S4		S5; S14		
400 m freestyle	Men; Details	S6; S7	S8; S9		S10			S12
400 m freestyle	Women; Details	S6; S7	S8; S9		S10			S13; S12
50m backstroke	Men; Details					S1; S2; S3		S4; S5
50m backstroke	Women; Details					S2		S4; S5
100 m backstroke	Men; Details	S14; S8	S11; S12		S2; S7		S6; S9; S10	
100 m backstroke	Women; Details	S14; S8	S11; S12; S13		S2; S7		S9; S10; S6	
50 m breaststroke	Men; Details							SB3
50 m breaststroke	Women; Details							SB2; SB3
100m breaststroke	Men; Details	SB11; SB12	SB4; SB5	SB9; SB14	SB8	SB7		SB6
100m breaststroke	Women; Details	SB11; SB12; SB13	SB4; SB5	SB9; SB14	SB8	SB7		SB6
50 m butterfly	Men; Details		S6	S5			S7	
50 m butterfly	Women; Details		S6	S5			S7	
100m butterfly	Men; Details		S10	S8		S12		S9
100m butterfly	Women; Details		S10	S8		S12		S9
150m medley	Men; Details						SM3; SM4	
150m medley	Women; Details						SM4	
200m medley	Men; Details			SM11; SM8; SM7; SM12	SM5; SM6	SM10; SM9		SM14
200m medley	Women; Details			SM7; SM11; SM12; SM13; SM8	SM5; SM6	SM10; SM9		SM14
4×50m freestyle relays	Men; Details				20 pts			
4×50m freestyle relays	Women; Details				20 pts			
4×50m freestyle relays	Mixed; Details		20 pts					
4×50m medley relays	Men; Details					20 pts		
4×50m medley relays	Women; Details					20 pts		
4 × 100 m freestyle relays	Men; Details						34 pts	
4 × 100 m freestyle relays	Women; Details						34 pts	
4 × 100 m medley relays	Men; Details							34 pts
4 × 100 m medley relays	Women; Details							34 pts

== Medal table ==
* Host nation (Netherlands)

Rank	Nation	Gold	Silver	Bronze	Total
1	Ukraine	37	29	28	94
2	Russia	34	32	29	95
3	Great Britain	30	27	16	73
4	Spain	15	19	14	48
5	Italy	11	2	6	19
6	Netherlands*	9	11	5	25
7	Germany	6	8	10	24
8	Norway	4	5	3	12
9	Sweden	3	1	4	8
10	France	3	1	3	7
11	Poland	2	4	6	12
12	Denmark	2	1	4	7
13	Belarus	2	1	1	4
14	Azerbaijan	1	2	2	5
15	Czech Republic	1	1	0	2
16	Iceland	1	0	1	2
17	Cyprus	1	0	0	1
18	Israel	0	5	2	7
19	Hungary	0	4	6	10
20	Greece	0	3	11	14
21	Estonia	0	2	1	3
22	Croatia	0	1	1	2
23	Austria	0	1	0	1
23	Finland	0	1	0	1
23	Turkey	0	1	0	1
26	Ireland	0	0	2	2
27	Belgium	0	0	1	1
27	Portugal	0	0	1	1
27	Slovakia	0	0	1	1
Totals (29 entries)		162	162	158	482

=== Multiple medallists ===
Many competitors won multiple medals at the 2014 Championships. The following athletes won five gold medals or more.

Name	Country	Medal	Event
Yevheniy Bohodayko	Ukraine	Gold; Gold; Gold; Gold; Gold; Gold; Gold; Silver; Silver	50m freestyle - S7; 100m freestyle - S7; 100m breaststroke - SB6; 200m medley - SM7; 100m butterfly - S3; Men's 4x50m medley relay 20pts 4x50m freestyle relay 20pts 100m backstroke - S7; 4 × 100 m freestyle relay 34pts
Dmytro Vynohradets	Ukraine	Gold; Gold; Gold; Gold; Gold; Gold; Gold; Silver	50m freestyle - S3; 100m freestyle - S3; 200m freestyle - S3; 150m medley - SM3; 50m backstroke - S3; Men's 4x50m medley relay 20pts 4x50m freestyle relay 20pts Mixed 4x50m freestyle relay 20pts
Stephanie Slater	Great Britain	Gold; Gold; Gold; Gold; Gold; Gold; Gold	50m freestyle - S8; 100m freestyle - S8; 200m medley - S8; 50m butterfly - S8; 100m backstroke S8; 4 × 100 m freestyle relay 34pts 4 × 100 m medley relay 34pts
Susannah Rodgers	Great Britain	Gold; Gold; Gold; Gold; Gold; Silver	50m freestyle - S7; 100m freestyle - S7; 400m freestyle - S7; 50m butterfly - S7; 4 × 100 m freestyle relay 34pts 100m backstroke S7
Darya Stukalova	Russia	Gold; Gold; Gold; Gold; Gold; Silver	50m freestyle - S12; 100m freestyle - S12; 400m freestyle - S12; 200m medley - SM12; 100m butterfly - S12; 100m backstroke - S12

== Highlights ==
=== Day 1 (4 August) ===
Ukraine finished the first day of the championship at the top of the medals table with six golds. The first record of the day fell to Summer Mortimer who broke the European record for the women's 50m freestyle in the S10 category. This was Mortimer's first major international competition since switching to the Netherlands teams after a successful career as a Canadian swimmer. Germany's Elena Krawzow also set a new European record, set when she won the women's 100m backstroke SB13. who set a new European record for the Women's 100 metre breastroke S13. Sarai Gascón Moreno of Spain shaved a hundredth of a second off her own European record to equal South Africa's Natalie du Toit's 50m freestyle S9 world record in the last swim of the morning session.

In the afternoon session records continued to fall. The Netherlands' Marc Evers broke his own World record, set at last year's World Championships in Montreal, while winning the 100m backstroke S14 final. Oleksii Fedyna of Ukraine set a new world record in the 100m breaststroke SB12, taking nearly two seconds of Uladzimir Izotau's old record, while beating the Belarusian into second place. In the very next heat, Fedyna's fellow countryman Serhii Palamarchuk recorded a European record in the S2 100m freestyle. Before the end of the day, two new European records were set, both in the 50m freestyle. They were made by Dmityr Grigorev of Russia in the men's S10 while Summer Mortimer beat her own record set in the morning session in the women's S10.

=== Day 2 (5 August) ===
Oliver Hynd of Great Britain won the first medal of the day, in the men's 400m freestyle S8. Hynd would see his team mates collect another four gold medals throughout the day, a total bettered only by Ukraine, who won another six to double their tally. Further successes in the morning session included Amalie Vinther collecting Denmark's first medal of the Championship, winning the women's 400m freestyle S8. While there was double Italian success with gold medals for Federico Morlacchi (men's 400m freestyle S9) and Cecilia Camellini (women's 100m backstroke S11).

Records continued to fall on day two with Russia's Dmitrii Kokarev setting a new world record in the men's 50m freestyle S2 with a time of 58.43 and making him the first European to swim under a minute in this class. In the women's 50m freestyle S4 Italy's Arjola Trimi secured her country's third gold of the day. In the same race Olga Sviderska of Ukraine, unable to compete at her own classification due to the absence of an S3 race, set a new world record in her class when she took bronze. In the final three races of the day, two European records fell. Dmitry Grigorev broke his second European record of the games with a time of 56.84 in men's 100m butterfly S10, this was followed the very next race when 17-year-old Polish athlete Oliwia Jablonska also broke the European record in the women's race, also in the S10 class.

=== Day 3 (6 August) ===
The morning session on day 3 started with a new world record in the first final; Great Britain's Stephanie Slater picked up her second gold of the Championships, when she took off more than a second from Jessica Long's record in the 100m butterfly S8. The host nation picked up their third gold of the tournament when Chantalle Zijderveld broke the European record in the women's 100m Butterfly S8. Ukraine continued their strong championship with a further gold medal in the morning, a third win for Dmytro Vynohradets who finished the session with the 200m Freestyle S3 title. Russia won three further gold medals completing their first clean sweep of the games, when Pavel Poltavtsev, Dmitry Grigorev and Dmitry Bartasinskiy took gold, silver and bronze in the 100m breaststroke SB9.

In the afternoon session, Russia began with their fourth and final gold of the day when Kokarev broke the world record in the 200m freestyle S2. A second world record fell in the afternoon, Spain's Michelle Alonso Morales taking a second off her own record in the 100m Breaststroke SB14 that she set two years previously in the London Paralympics. Both Italy and Ukraine added two further gold medals, Arjola Trimi (200m freestyle S4) and Federico Morlacchi (200m freestyle S9) for Italy and Yelyzaveta Mereshko (50m freestyle S6) and Yevheniy Bohodayko (200m individual medley SM12). The day ended as it started with success for Great Britain with Stephanie Slater winning the 200m individual medley SM8. Britain finished as the day's most successful country with five golds in total, which also included a new European record for Andrew Mullen in the men's 50m butterfly S5.

== Participating nations ==
Below is the list of countries who agreed to participate in the Championships and the requested number of athlete places for each.

- Austria (2)
- Azerbaijan (2)
- Belarus (4)
- Belgium (5)
- Croatia (9)
- Cyprus (1)
- Czech Republic (3)
- Denmark (6)
- Estonia (7)
- Finland (4)
- France (9)
- Germany (19)
- Great Britain (30)
- Greece (21)
- Hungary (16)
- Iceland (4)
- Ireland (5)
- Israel (8)
- Italy (15)
- Latvia (1)
- Lithuania (3)
- Malta (3)
- Netherlands (16)
- Norway (9)
- Poland (17)
- Portugal (10)
- Romania (2)
- Russia (51)
- Serbia (1)
- Slovenia (2)
- Slovakia (4)
- Spain (23)
- Sweden (7)
- Switzerland (1)
- Turkey (6)
- Ukraine (51)

== Footnotes ==
Notes
