= 2023 World Para Swimming Championships – Men's 50 metre freestyle =

The men's 50m freestyle events at the 2023 World Para Swimming Championships were held at the Manchester Aquatics Centre between 31 July and 6 August. Events were held in eleven classifications.

== Medalists ==
Event	Gold	Silver	Bronze
S3	Denys Ostapchenko; Ukraine	Daniel Ferrer Robles; Spain	Serhii Palamarchuk; Ukraine
S4	Ami Omer Dadaon; Israel	Cameron Leslie; New Zealand	Takayuki Suzuki; Japan
S5	Guo Jincheng; China	Yuan Weiyi; China	Samuel Da Silva Di Oliviera; Brazil
S6	Antonio Fantin; Italy	Daniel Xavier Mendes; Brazil	Laurent Chardard; France
S7	Andrii Trusov; Ukraine	Carlos Serrano Zárate; Colombia	Yurii Shenhur; Ukraine
S8	Dimosthenis Michalentzakis; Greece	Noah Jaffe; United States	Gabriel Silva de Souza; Brazil
S9	Simone Barlaam; Italy	Fredrik Solberg; Norway	Ugo Didier; France
S10	Rowan Crothers; Australia	Thomas Gallagher; Australia	Phelipe Melo; Brazil
S11	Rogier Dorsman; Netherlands	Keiichi Kimura; Japan	Hua Dongdong; China
S12	Maksym Veraksa; Ukraine	Illia Yaremenko; Ukraine	Raman Salei; Azerbaijan
S13	Oleksii Virchenko; Ukraine	Islam Aslanov; Uzbekistan	Nicolas Guy Turbide; Canada

== Results ==
=== S3 ===
13 Swimmers representing 10 national teams entered the race. Heats were held in the morning of Friday 4 August. The top eight swimmers, regardless of heat, qualified for the final.

This event is open to S1 and S2 swimmers in addition to the S3 classification. The applicable records entering the event were as follows:

Record	Swimmer	Time
S3 World record	Huang Wenpan (China)	38.81
S3 Championship record	Huang Wenpan (China)	38.81
S2 World record	Zou Liankang (China)	50.65
S2 Championship record	Zou Liankang (China)	55.29
S1 World record	Itzhak Mamistvalov (Israel)	1:03.80
S1 Championship record	Itzhak Mamistvalov (Israel)	1:08.22

Heats

Rank	Heat	Lane	Name	Nation	Class	Result	Notes
1	1	5	Serhii Palamarchuk	Ukraine	S3	44.90	Q
2	2	5	Denys Ostapchenko	Ukraine	S3	46.25	Q
3	2	4	Diego López Díaz	Mexico	S3	47.68	Q
4	1	4	Daniel Ferrer Robles	Spain	S3	47.74	Q
5	1	6	Krzysztof Lechniak	Poland	S3	51.23	Q
6	1	3	Gabriel Araújo	Brazil	S2	51.30	Q CR
7	2	3	Marcos Zarate Rodriguez	Mexico	S3	51.57	Q
8	2	6	Ahmed Kelly	Australia	S3	51.89	Q
9	2	2	Charkorn Kaewsri	Thailand	S3	55.80	
10	1	2	Ioannis Kostakis	Greece	S3	59.19	
11	1	7	Patricio Larenas Albayay	Chile	S3	1:01.22	
12	2	1	Youssef Elsayed	Egypt	S3	1:03.46	
13	2	7	Bruno Becker	Brazil	S2	1:04.85	

Final

Rank	Name	Nation	Result	Notes
1st place, gold medalist(s)	Denys Ostapchenko	Ukraine	45.01	
2nd place, silver medalist(s)	Daniel Ferrer Robles	Spain	45.68	
3rd place, bronze medalist(s)	Serhii Palamarchuk	Ukraine	45.89	
4	Diego López Díaz	Mexico	48.03	
5	Gabriel Araújo	Brazil	51.84	
6	Marcos Zarate Rodriguez	Mexico	51.94	
7	Ahmed Kelly	Australia	52.35	
8	Krzysztof Lechniak	Poland	52.68	

=== S4 ===
9 Swimmers representing 8 national teams entered the race. Heats were held in the morning of Friday 4 August. The top eight swimmers, regardless of heat, qualified for the final.

The applicable records entering the event were as follows:

Record	Swimmer	Time
World record	Ami Omer Dadaon (Israel)	36.25
Championship record	Ami Omer Dadaon (Israel)	36.25

Heats

Rank	Heat	Lane	Name	Nation	Result	Notes
1	1	4	Cameron Leslie	New Zealand	37.50	Q
2	2	4	Ami Omer Dadaon	Israel	38.58	Q
3	2	5	Takayuki Suzuki	Japan	39.03	Q
4	2	3	Ángel de Jesús Camacho Ramírez	Mexico	39.59	Q
5	1	5	Ariel Malyar	Israel	41.19	Q
6	1	6	Andreas Ernhofer	Austria	42.58	Q
7	1	3	Luigi Beggiato	Italy	42.81	Q
8	2	6	Jo Gi-seong	South Korea	43.06	Q
9	2	2	Matz Topkin	Estonia	45.73	

Final

Rank	Name	Nation	Result	Notes
1st place, gold medalist(s)	Ami Omer Dadaon	Israel	36.26	
2nd place, silver medalist(s)	Cameron Leslie	New Zealand	37.22	
3rd place, bronze medalist(s)	Takayuki Suzuki	Japan	38.63	
4	Ángel de Jesús Camacho Ramírez	Mexico	39.10	
5	Ariel Mayar	Israel	40.27	
6	Luigi Beggiato	Italy	41.14	
7	Andreas Ernhofer	Austria	41.56	
8	Jo Gi-seong	South Korea	42.65	

=== S5 ===
13 Swimmers representing seven national teams entered the race. Heats were held in the morning of Monday 21 July. The top eight swimmers, regardless of heat, qualify for the final.

The applicable records entering the event were as follows:

Record	Swimmer	Time
World record	Antonio Fantin (ITA)	30.16
Championship record	Daniel de Faria Dias (ITA)	31.83

Heats

Rank	Heat	Lane	Name	Nation	Result	Notes
1	2	4	Guo Jincheng	China	30.09	Q WR CR
2	1	7	Yuan Weiyi	China	31.63	Q CR
3	1	4	Samuel Da Silva De Oliveira	Brazil	32.80	Q
4	2	5	Lichao Wang	China	33.11	Q
5	2	1	Oleksandr Komarov	Ukraine	33.33	Q
6	1	5	Francesco Bocciardo	Italy	33.50	Q
7	2	3	Muhammad Nur Syaiful Zulkafli	Malaysia	33.74	Q
8	2	7	Eigo Tanaka	Japan	33.80	Q
9	2	6	Yaroslav Semenenko	Ukraine	34.05	
10	1	3	Andrii Drapkin	Ukraine	34.21	
11	1	6	Bertran Antoni Ponce	Spain	35.16	
12	2	2	Kaede Hinata	Japan	35.57	
13	1	2	Sebastian Rodriguez	Spain	36.48	

Final

Rank	Lane	Athlete	Nation	Result	Notes
1st place, gold medalist(s)	4	Guo Jincheng	China	29.78	WR CR
2nd place, silver medalist(s)	5	Yuan Weiyi	China	31.57	
3rd place, bronze medalist(s)	3	Samuel Da Silva De Oliveira	Brazil	31.58	
4	6	Lichao Wang	China	31.73	
5	2	Oleksandr Komarov	Ukraine	32.23	
6	1	Muhammad Nur Syaiful Zulkafli	Malaysia	33.26	
7	7	Francesco Bocciardo	Italy	33.58	
8	8	Eigo Tanaka	Japan	34.49	

=== S6 ===
12 Swimmers representing 9 national teams entered the race. Heats were held in the morning of Friday 4 August. The top eight swimmers, regardless of heat, qualified for the final.

The applicable records entering the event were as follows:

Record	Swimmer	Time
World record	(China) Xu Qing	28.57
Championship record	(Italy) Antonio Fantin	29.16

Heats

Rank	Heat	Lane	Name	Nation	Result	Notes
1	2	4	Antonio Fantin	Italy	29.00	Q, CR
2	2	5	Daniel Xavier Mendes	Brazil	29.81	Q
3	1	5	Laurent Chardard	France	30.34	Q
4	1	3	Talisson Glock	Brazil	30.53	Q
4	2	6	Jia Hongguang	China	30.53	Q
6	2	2	Wang Jingang	China	31.09	Q
7	1	6	Georgios Sfaltos	Greece	31.80	Q
8	2	7	David Rendón	Colombia	32.53	Q
9	1	2	Raul Gutierrez Bermudez	Mexico	32.76	
10	2	3	Daniel Videira	Portugal	33.28	
11	1	7	Mateus Angula	Namibia	46.91	
	1	4	Nelson Crispín	Colombia		DSQ

Final

Rank	Name	Nation	Result	Notes
1st place, gold medalist(s)	Antonio Fantin	Italy	28.59	CR
2nd place, silver medalist(s)	Daniel Xavier Mendes	Brazil	29.74	
3rd place, bronze medalist(s)	Laurent Chordard	France	30.02	
4	Talisson Glock	Brazil	30.40	
5	Jia Hongguang	China	30.42	
6	Wang Jingang	China	30.73	
7	David Rendón	Colombia	32.24	
8	Georgios Sfaltos	Greece	32.37	

=== S7 ===
9 Swimmers representing 7 national teams entered the race. Heats were held in the morning of 5 August. The top eight swimmers, regardless of heat, qualify for the final.

The applicable records entering the event were as follows:

Record	Swimmer	Time
World record	(Ukraine) Andrii Trusov	27.07
Championship record	(Ukraine) Andrii Trusov	27.07

Heats

Rank	Name	Nation	Result	Notes
1	Carlos Serrano Zárate	Colombia	28.48	Q
2	Yurii Shenhur	Ukraine	28.64	Q
3	Andrii Trusov	Ukraine	28.99	Q
4	Christian Sadie	South Africa	29.20	Q
5	Yevhenii Bohodaiko	Ukraine	29.94	Q
6	Toh Wei Soong	Singapore	30.38	Q
7	Suyash Narayan Jadhav	India	32.64	Q
8	Federico Bicelli	Italy	32.93	Q
9	Ahmed Alhindawi	Bahrain	42.93	

Final

The final was held at 18:06 on 5 August.

Rank	Name	Nation	Result	Notes
1st place, gold medalist(s)	Andrii Trusov	Ukraine	27.38	
2nd place, silver medalist(s)	Carlos Serrano Zárate	Colombia	27.79	AM
3rd place, bronze medalist(s)	Yurii Shenhur	Ukraine	28.09	
4	Federico Bicelli	Italy	28.62	
5	Yevhenii Bohodaiko	Ukraine	28.83	
6	Christian Sadie	South Africa	29.45	
7	Toh Wei Soong	Singapore	29.64	
8	Suyash Narayan Jadhav	India	32.24	

=== S8 ===
10 Swimmers representing 10 national teams entered the race. Heats were held in the morning of 4 August. The top eight swimmers, regardless of heat, qualify for the final.

The applicable records entering the event were as follows:

Record	Swimmer	Time
World record	Denis Tarasov RPC	25.32
Championship record	Denis Tarasov RPC	25.34

Heats

Rank	Heat	Lane	Name	Nation	Result	Notes
1	1	4	Dimosthenis Michalentzakis	Greece	27.00	Q
2	2	5	Noah Jaffe	United States	27.09	Q
3	2	4	Gabriel Silva de Souza	Brazil	27.57	Q
4	1	5	Michal Golus	Poland	27.59	Q
5	1	6	Wu Hongliang	China	27.81	Q
6	2	6	Halim Abd Mohammad	Malaysia	28.07	Q
7	1	2	Diogo Cancela	Portugal	28.08	Q
8	1	3	Alberto Amodeo	Italy	28.55	Q
9	2	3	Luis Andrade Guillen	Mexico	28.98	
10	2	2	Sergio Martos	Spain	29.17	

Final

Rank	Lane	Athlete	Nation	Result	Notes
1st place, gold medalist(s)	4	Dimosthemos Michalentzakis	Greece	27.01	
2nd place, silver medalist(s)	5	Noah Jaffe	United States	27.14	
3rd place, bronze medalist(s)	3	Gabriel Silva de Souza	Brazil	27.32	
4	1	Diogo Cancela	Portugal	27.55	
5	6	Michal Golus	Poland	27.57	
6	2	Wu Hongliang	China	27.68	
7	7	Halim Abd Mohammad	Malaysia	28.21	
8	8	Alberto Amodeo	Italy	28.61	

=== S9 ===
9 swimmers representing eight national teams entered the race. Heats were held in the morning of 6 August. The top eight swimmers, regardless of heat, qualify for the final.

The applicable records entering the event were as follows:

Record	Swimmer	Time
World record	Simone Barlaam (ITA)	24.00
Championship record	Simone Barlaam (ITA)	24.00

Heats

Rank	Heat	Lane	Name	Nation	Result	Notes
1	2	4	Simone Barlaam	Italy	24.35	Q
2	1	4	Fredrik Solberg	Norway	25.06	Q
3	1	3	Dmytro Vasylenko	Ukraine	26.08	Q
4	2	5	Jamal Hill	United States	26.22	Q
5	2	3	Martinez Schrenck	Spain	26.39	Q
6	1	5	Ugo Didier	France	26.44	Q
7	2	6	Malte Braunschweig	Germany	26.66	Q
8	1	6	José Antonio Mari	Spain	26.85	Q
9	2	2	Scody Victor	Mauritius	33.23	

Final

Rank	Lane	Swimmer	Nation	Time	Notes
1st place, gold medalist(s)	4	Simone Barlaam	Italy	23.96	WR CR
2nd place, silver medalist(s)	5	Fredrik Solberg	Norway	25.16	
3rd place, bronze medalist(s)	7	Ugo Didier	France	25.79	
4	6	Jamal Hill	United States	25.95	
5	3	Dmytro Vasylenko	Ukraine	26.23	
6	2	Martinez Schrenck	Spain	26.41	
7	1	Malte Braunschweig	Germany	26.6	
8	8	José Antonio Mari	Spain	26.76	

=== S10 ===
16 Swimmers representing seven national teams entered the race. Heats were held in the morning of Monday 21 July. The top eight swimmers, regardless of heat, qualify for the final.

The applicable records entering the event were as follows:

Record	Swimmer	Time
World record	Andre Brasil (BRA)	23.16
Championship record	Andre Brasil (BRA)	23.20

Heats

Rank	Heat	Lane	Name	Nation	Result	Notes
1	2	4	Rowan Crothers	Australia	23.58	Q
2	1	4	Thomas Gallagher	Australia	23.60	Q
3	2	5	Phelipe Melo	Brazil	23.75	Q
4	2	3	Ihor Nimchenko	Ukraine	24.24	Q
5	1	5	Stefano Raimondi	Italy	24.44	Q
6	1	3	David Levecq	Spain	25.20	Q
7	1	6	Alan Ogorzalek	Poland	25.39	Q
8	2	6	Florent Marais	France	25.66	Q
9	2	7	William Martin	Australia	25.89	
10	2	8	Sina Zeyghaminejad	Iran	26.03	
11	1	1	Akito Minai	Japan	26.18	
12	1	7	Justin Kaps	Germany	26.19	
13	2	1	Shahin Izadyar	Iran	26.23	
14	2	2	Alexander Elliot	Canada	26.25	
15	1	2	Nicolas Matias Nieto	Argentina	26.29	
-	1	8	Zeiad Essam Hasby	Egypt	DSQ	

Final

The final was held at 20:34 on 31 July.

Rank	Lane	Athlete	Nation	Result	Notes
1st place, gold medalist(s)	4	Rowan Crothers	Australia	23.42	
2nd place, silver medalist(s)	5	Thomas Gallagher	Australia	23.70	
3rd place, bronze medalist(s)	3	Phelipe Melo	Brazil	23.72	
4	6	Ihor Nimchenko	Ukraine	24.03	
5	2	Stefano Raimondi	Italy	24.15	
6	7	David Levecq	Spain	25.06	
7	8	Florent Marais	France	25.27	
8	1	Alan Ogorzalek	Poland	25.41	

=== S11 ===
13 Swimmers representing ten national teams entered the race. Heats were held in the morning of Monday 21 July, the final that evening. The top eight swimmers, regardless of heat, qualify for the final.

The applicable records entering the event were as follows:

Record	Swimmer	Time
World record	Yang Bozun (ITA)	25.27
Championship record	Brad Snyder (USA)	25.28

Heats

Rank	Heat	Lane	Name	Nation	Result	Notes
1	2	5	Keiichi Kimura	Japan	26.32	Q
2	1	4	Edgaras Matakas	Lithuania	26.54	Q
3	2	4	Rogier Dorsman	Netherlands	26.61	Q
4	2	3	Hua Dongdong	China	26.63	Q
5	1	5	Uchu Tomita	Japan	26.73	Q
6	2	7	Danylo Chufarov	Ukraine	27.04	Q
7	1	3	David Kratochvil	Czech Republic	27.21	Q
8	1	7	Mykhailo Serbin	Ukraine	27.28	Q
9	1	6	Correa De S Rheine	Brazil	27.42	
10	2	6	Elvira J Cantero	Spain	27.67	
11	2	2	Marco Meneses	Portugal	28.01	
12	2	1	Wojciech Makowski	Poland	28.36	
13	1	2	Jarra M Dambelleh	Spain	28.95	

Final

The final took place at 19:31 on 31 July.

Rank	Lane	Athlete	Nation	Result	Notes
1st place, gold medalist(s)	3	Rogier Dorsman	Netherlands	25.89	
2nd place, silver medalist(s)	4	Keiichi Kimura	Japan	26.05	
3rd place, bronze medalist(s)	6	Hua Dongdong	China	26.09	
4	5	Edgaras Matakas	Lithuania	26.36	
5	7	Danylo Chufarov	Ukraine	26.41	
6	2	Uchu Tomita	Japan	26.67	
7	8	Mykhailo Serbin	Ukraine	26.79	
8	1	David Kratochvil	Czech Republic	27.56	

=== S12 ===
11 Swimmers entered the race. Heats were held in the morning of 2 August. The top eight swimmers, regardless of heat, qualify for the final.

The applicable records entering the event were as follows:

Record	Swimmer	Time
World record	Maksym Veraksa (Ukraine)	22.99
Championship record	Maksym Veraksa (Ukraine)	23.26

Heats

Rank	Heat	Lane	Athlete	Nation	Result	Notes
1	1	4	Maksym Veraksa	Ukraine	24.22	Q
2	2	5	Raman Salei	Azerbaijan	24.78	Q
3	2	4	Illia Yaremenko	Ukraine	24.8	Q
4	1	5	Stephen Clegg	Great Britain	25.11	Q
5	1	6	Alex Villarejo Martin	Spain	25.58	Q
6	1	3	Douglas Matera	Brazil	25.71	Q
7	2	6	Maulana Rifky Yavianda	Indonesia	25.78	Q
8	2	2	Tamayo Borja Sanz	Spain	26.38	Q
9	1	2	Jahan Abadi Karimi	Iran	27.44	
10	2	7	Serghei Sirovatchin	Moldova	29.55	
11	2	3	Oleksii Fedyna	Ukraine	29.91	

Final

Rank	Heat	Lane	Athlete	Nation	Result	Notes
1st place, gold medalist(s)	1	4	Maksym Veraksa	Ukraine	24.17	
2nd place, silver medalist(s)	1	3	Illia Yaremenko	Ukraine	24.38	
3rd place, bronze medalist(s)	1	5	Raman Salei	Azerbaijan	24.40	
4	1	6	Stephen Clegg	Great Britain	24.75	
5	1	7	Douglas Matera	Brazil	25.28	
6	1	2	Alex Villarejo Martin	Spain	25.80	
7	1	1	Rifky Yavianda	Indonesia	25.98	
8	1	8	Borja Sanz Tamayo	Spain	26.38	

=== S13 ===
8 Swimmers representing 5 national teams entered the race. The race progressed straight to final on 4 August.

The applicable records entering the event were as follows:

Record	Swimmer	Time
World record	Ihar Boki BPC	23.20
Championship record	Ihar Boki BPC	23.20

Final

Rank	Lane	Athlete	Nation	Result	Notes
1st place, gold medalist(s)	5	Oleksii Virchenko	Ukraine	23.47	
2nd place, silver medalist(s)	4	Islam Aslanov	Uzbekistan	23.78	
3rd place, bronze medalist(s)	6	Nicolas Turbide	Canada	23.88	AR
4	7	Taliso Engel	Germany	24.27	
5	3	Muzaffar Tursunkhujaev	Uzbekistan	24.49	
6	2	Kyrylo Garashchenko	Ukraine	24.89	
7	8	Kirill Pankov	Uzbekistan	25.30	
8	1	E Mollar Alhambra	Spain	25.51	

-->
