= 2022 World Para Swimming Championships – Men's 50 metre freestyle =

The men's 50m freestyle events at the 2022 World Para Swimming Championships were held at the Penteada Olympic Swimming Complex in Madeira between 12–18 June.

== Medalists ==
Event	Gold	Silver	Bronze
S3	Diego López Díaz; Mexico	Jesús Hernández Hernández; Mexico	Denys Ostapchenko; Ukraine
S4	Ami Omer Dadaon; Israel	Cameron Leslie; New Zealand	Takayuki Suzuki; Japan
S5	Francesco Bocciardo; Italy	Samuel da Silva de Oliveira; Brazil	Muhammad Nur Syaiful Zulkafli; Malaysia
S6	Antonio Fantin; Italy	Nelson Crispín; Colombia	Thijs van Hofweegen; Netherlands
S7	Andrii Trusov; Ukraine	Carlos Serrano Zárate; Colombia	Federico Bicelli; Italy
S8	Gabriel Cristiano Silva de Souza; Brazil	Dimosthenis Michalentzakis; Greece	Michał Golus; Poland
S9	Simone Barlaam; Italy	Fredrik Solberg; Norway Jamal Hill; United States	
S10	Rowan Crothers; Australia	Phelipe Rodrigues; Brazil	Stefano Raimondi; Italy
S11	Rogier Dorsman; Netherlands	Edgaras Matakas; Lithuania	Keiichi Kimura; Japan
S12	Raman Salei; Azerbaijan	Illia Yaremenko; Ukraine	Maksym Veraska; Ukraine
S13	Oleksii Virchenko; Ukraine	Kyrylo Garashchenko; Ukraine	Islam Aslanov; Uzbekistan

== Results ==
=== S3 ===
Heats

15 swimmers from eleven nations took part. The swimmers with the top eight times, regardless of heat, advanced to the final.

Rank	Heat	Lane	Name	Nation	Result	Notes
1	2	4	Diego López Díaz	Mexico	45.61	Q
2	2	5	Jesús Hernández Hernández	Mexico	46.45	Q
3	1	5	Josia Topf	Germany	46.80	Q
4	1	4	Denys Ostapchenko	Ukraine	47.50	Q
5	1	3	Vincenzo Boni	Italy	50.57	Q
6	2	6	Marcos Zarate Rodriguez	Mexico	50.82	Q
7	1	6	Miguel Ángel Martínez	Spain	54.88	Q
8	2	2	Grant Patterson	Australia	55.02	Q
9	1	2	Charkorn Kaeswri	Thailand	56.66	
10	2	7	Ioannis Kostakis	Greece	57.70	
11	1	8	Patricio Larenas Albayay	Chile	59.08	
12	2	7	Krzysztof Lechniak	Poland	59.30	
13	1	7	Bruno Becker da Silva	Brazil	1:00.19	
14	2	8	Youssef Elsayed	Egypt	1:02.30	
15	2	3	Daniel Ferrer Robles	Spain	DNS	

Final

The final was held on 16 June 2022.

Rank	Name	Nation	Result	Notes
1st place, gold medalist(s)	Diego López Díaz	Mexico	44.85	
2nd place, silver medalist(s)	Jesús Hernández Hernández	Mexico	46.05	
3rd place, bronze medalist(s)	Denys Ostapchenko	Ukraine	46.45	
4	Josia Topf	Germany	46.90	
5	Vincenzo Boni	Italy	48.49	
6	Marcos Zarate Rodriguez	Mexico	53.26	
7	Grant Patterson	Australia	55.73	
8	Miguel Ángel Martínez	Spain	56.11	

=== S4 ===
Heats

12 swimmers from 11 nations took part. The swimmers with the top eight times, regardless of heat, advanced to the final.

Rank	Heat	Lane	Name	Nation	Result	Notes
1	2	4	Cameron Leslie	New Zealand	36.75	Q, WR
2	1	4	Ami Omer Dadaon	Israel	38.56	Q
3	2	5	Takayuki Suzuki	Japan	39.43	Q
4	2	3	Ángel de Jesús Camacho Ramírez	Mexico	41.28	Q
5	1	3	Ariel Malyar	Israel	41.31	Q
6	1	5	Luigi Beggiato	Italy	42.05	Q
7	1	6	Jo Giseong	South Korea	42.30	Q
8	2	2	Andreas Ernhofer	Austria	44.18	Q
9	2	6	Arnost Petracek	Czech Republic	44.44	
10	1	7	Lyndon Longhorne	United Kingdom	45.06	
11	1	2	Matz Topkin	Estonia	45.12	
12	2	7	Miguel Luque	Spain	45.73	

Final

The final was held on 16 June 2022.

Rank	Name	Nation	Result	Notes
1st place, gold medalist(s)	Ami Omer Dadaon	Israel	36.25	WR
2nd place, silver medalist(s)	Cameron Leslie	New Zealand	36.71	OC
3rd place, bronze medalist(s)	Takayuki Suzuki	Japan	38.99	
4	Ángel de Jesús Camacho Ramírez	Mexico	40.10	
5	Luigi Beggiato	Italy	40.21	
6	Jo Giseong	South Korea	42.80	
7	Andreas Ernhofer	Austria	44.02	
8	Ariel Malyar	Israel	44.83	

=== S5 ===
Heats

11 swimmers from nine nations took part. The swimmers with the top eight times, regardless of heat, advanced to the final.

Rank	Heat	Lane	Name	Nation	Result	Notes
1	2	5	Samuel da Silva de Oliveira	Brazil	33.28	Q
2	1	4	Francesco Bocciardo	Italy	33.94	Q
3	2	4	Muhammad Nur Syaiful Zulkafli	Malaysia	34.22	Q
4	2	3	Antoni Ponce Bertran	Spain	34.99	Q
5	2	6	Kaede Hinata	Japan	35.01	Q
6	1	5	Sebastián Rodríguez Veloso	Spain	36.54	Q
7	1	2	Phuchit Aingchaiyaphum	Thailand	36.57	Q
8	1	6	Luis Huerta Poza	Spain	36.79	Q
9	2	7	Abbas Karimi	United States	36.95	
10	1	3	Siyazbek Daliyev	Kazakhstan	37.13	
11	2	2	Alexandros-Stylianos Lergios	Greece	37.40	

Final

The final was held on 12 June 2022.

Rank	Athlete	Nation	Result	Notes
1st place, gold medalist(s)	Francesco Bocciardo	Italy	33.11	
2nd place, silver medalist(s)	Samuel da Silva de Oliveira	Brazil	33.28	
3rd place, bronze medalist(s)	Muhammad Nur Syaiful Zulkafli	Malaysia	33.81	
4	Antoni Ponce Bertran	Spain	35.29	
5	Kaede Hinata	Japan	35.48	
6	Sebastián Rodríguez Veloso	Spain	35.74	
7	Phuchit Aingchaiyaphum	Greece	36.41	
8	Luis Huerta Poza	Spain	37.40	

=== S6 ===
Heats

14 swimmers from eleven nations took part. The swimmers with the top eight times, regardless of heat, advanced to the final.

Rank	Heat	Lane	Name	Nation	Result	Notes
1	2	4	Antonio Fantin	Italy	29.39	Q
2	2	5	Nelson Crispín	Colombia	29.74	Q
3	1	4	Thijs van Hofweegen	Netherlands	30.34	Q
4	1	5	Daniel Xavier Mendes	Brazil	30.56	Q
5	2	3	Laurent Chardard	France	30.59	Q
6	1	3	Talisson Glock	Brazil	30.88	Q
7	1	2	Georgios Sfaltos	Greece	32.10	Q
8	2	6	Juan Jose Gutierrez Bermudez	Mexico	32.14	Q
9	2	7	Leo McCrea	Switzerland	32.66	
10	2	2	Panagiotis Christakis	Greece	32.79	
11	2	1	Daniel Videira	Portugal	33.56	
12	1	6	Raul Gutierrez Bermudez	Mexico	33.61	
13	1	7	Alejandro Yared Rojas Cabrera	Spain	34.15	
14	1	1	Mateus Angula	Angola	44.16	

Final

The final was held on 16 June 2022.

Rank	Name	Nation	Result	Notes
1st place, gold medalist(s)	Antonio Fantin	Italy	29.16	CR
2nd place, silver medalist(s)	Nelson Crispín	Colombia	29.68	
3rd place, bronze medalist(s)	Thijs van Hofweegen	Netherlands	29.94	
4	Daniel Xavier Mendes	Brazil	30.08	
5	Laurent Chardard	France	30.29	
6	Talisson Glock	Brazil	31.37	
7	Georgios Sfaltos	Greece	32.26	
8	Juan Jose Gutierrez Bermudez	Mexico	32.73	

=== S7 ===
Final

The final was held on 17 June 2022.

Rank	Name	Nation	Result	Notes
1st place, gold medalist(s)	Andrii Trusov	Ukraine	27.57	
2nd place, silver medalist(s)	Carlos Serrano Zárate	Colombia	28.23	
3rd place, bronze medalist(s)	Federico Bicelli	Italy	28.65	
4	Matthew Levy	Australia	28.76	
5	Christian Sadie	South Africa	29.65	
6	Yevhenii Bohodaiko	Ukraine	29.73	
7	Suyash Narayan Jadhav	India	32.02	

=== S8 ===
Heats

13 swimmers from eleven nations took part. The swimmers with the top eight times, regardless of heat, advanced to the final.

Rank	Heat	Lane	Name	Nation	Result	Notes
1	2	4	Gabriel Cristiano Silva de Souza	Brazil	27.12	Q
2	1	4	Dimosthenis Michalentzakis	Greece	27.23	Q
3	1	3	Michał Golus	Poland	27.82	Q
4	2	6	Felix Cowan	Canada	28.11	Q
5	1	5	Sergio Salvador Martos Minguet	Spain	28.24	Q
6	2	5	Luis Armando Andrade Guillen	Mexico	28.28	Q
7	2	3	Alberto Amodeo	Italy	29.11	Q
8	2	2	Jurijs Semjonovs	Latvia	29.44	Q
9	1	6	Patchara Singhmanon	Thailand	29.49	
10	2	1	Shridhar Nagappa Malagi	India	29.52	
11	1	2	Carlos Martinez Fernandez	Spain	29.61	
12	1	7	Zach Zona	Canada	29.63	
13	2	7	Diogo Cancela	Portugal	32.52	

Final

The final was held on 16 June 2022.

Rank	Athlete	Nation	Result	Notes
1st place, gold medalist(s)	Gabriel Cristiano Silva de Souza	Brazil	27.19	
2nd place, silver medalist(s)	Dimosthenis Michalentzakis	Greece	27.37	
3rd place, bronze medalist(s)	Michał Golus	Poland	27.56	
4	Felix Cowan	Canada	27.63	
5	Sergio Salvador Martos Minguet	Spain	28.19	
6	Luis Armando Andrade Guillen	Mexico	28.25	
7	Alberto Amodeo	Italy	29.03	
8	Jurijs Semjonovs	Latvia	29.26	

=== S9 ===
Final

The final was held on 18 June 2022.

Rank	Athlete	Nation	Result	Notes
1st place, gold medalist(s)	Simone Barlaam	Italy	24.00	=WR
2nd place, silver medalist(s)	Fredrik Solberg	Norway	25.66	
2nd place, silver medalist(s)	Jamal Hill	United States	25.66	
4	William Martin	Australia	25.82	
5	Ariel Enrique Schrenck Martinez	Spain	26.30	
6	Simone Ciulli	Italy	26.49	
7	Jose Antonio Mari Alcaraz	Spain	26.59	
8	Leo Lahteenmaki	Finland	26.61	

=== S10 ===
Heats

11 swimmers from nine nations took part. The swimmers with the top eight times, regardless of heat, advanced to the final.

Rank	Heat	Lane	Name	Nation	Result	Notes
1	2	4	Rowan Crothers	Australia	23.68	Q
2	2	5	Stefano Raimondi	Italy	24.33	Q
3	1	4	Phelipe Rodrigues	Brazil	24.50	Q
4	1	5	David Levecq	Spain	25.26	Q
5	2	2	Alan Ogorzalek	Poland	25.57	Q
6	2	3	Alec Elliot	Canada	25.67	Q
7	1	3	Riccardo Menciotti	Italy	25.80	Q
8	2	6	Jack Gill	Canada	25.84	Q
9	1	6	Nicolas Matias Nieto	Argentina	25.88	
10	2	7	Akito Minai	Japan	26.19	
11	1	2	Justin Kaps	Germany	26.41	

Final

The final was held on 12 June 2022.

Rank	Athlete	Nation	Result	Notes
1st place, gold medalist(s)	Rowan Crothers	Australia	23.51	
2nd place, silver medalist(s)	Phelipe Rodrigues	Brazil	23.76	
3rd place, bronze medalist(s)	Stefano Raimondi	Italy	23.95	
4	David Levecq	Spain	25.18	
5	Alan Ogorzalek	Poland	25.42	
6	Alec Elliot	Canada	25.67	
7	Riccardo Menciotti	Italy	25.75	
8	Jack Gill	Canada	25.83	

=== S11 ===
Heats

14 swimmers from 11 nations took part. The swimmers with the top eight times, regardless of heat, advanced to the final.

Rank	Heat	Lane	Name	Nation	Result	Notes
1	2	4	Edgaras Matakas	Lithuania	26.08	Q
2	2	5	Rogier Dorsman	Netherlands	26.42	Q
3	2	2	José Ramón Cantero Elvira	Spain	27.24	Q
4	1	3	Matheus Rheine Correa de Souza	Brazil	27.65	Q
5	1	5	Keiichi Kimura	Japan	27.69	Q
6	1	4	Wendell Belarmino Pereira	Brazil	27.75	Q
7	1	6	Uchu Tomita	Japan	27.76	Q
8	2	7	Marco Meneses	Portugal	27.86	Q
9	1	2	José Luiz Perdigão Maia	Brazil	28.12	
10	2	1	David Kratochvil	Czech Republic	28.32	
11	1	7	Matthew Cabraja	Canada	28.58	
12	2	3	Wojciech Makowski	Poland	28.77	
13	1	1	Leider Albeiro Lemus Rojas	Colombia	29.23	
	2	6	Mykhailo Serbin	Ukraine	DNS	

Final

The final was held on 12 June 2022.

Rank	Athlete	Nation	Result	Notes
1st place, gold medalist(s)	Rogier Dorsman	Netherlands	26.04	
2nd place, silver medalist(s)	Edgaras Matakas	Lithuania	26.19	
3rd place, bronze medalist(s)	Keiichi Kimura	Japan	26.96	
4	Matheus Rheine Correa de Souza	Brazil	27.29	
5	José Ramón Cantero Elvira	Spain	27.38	
6	Uchu Tomita	Japan	27.44	
7	Wendell Belarmino Pereira	Brazil	27.55	
8	Marco Meneses	Portugal	28.00	

=== S12 ===
Final

The final was held on 14 June 2022.

Rank	Athlete	Nation	Result	Notes
1st place, gold medalist(s)	Raman Salei	Azerbaijan	24.18	
2nd place, silver medalist(s)	Illia Yaremenko	Ukraine	24.20	
3rd place, bronze medalist(s)	Maksym Veraska	Ukraine	24.32	
4	Oleksii Fedyna	Ukraine	24.70	
5	Stephen Clegg	United Kingdom	24.85	
6	Borja Sanz Tamayo	Spain	26.17	

=== S13 ===
Heats

11 swimmers from 7 nations took part. The swimmers with the top eight times, regardless of heat, advanced to the final.

Rank	Heat	Lane	Name	Nation	Result	Notes
1	2	4	Islam Aslanov	Uzbekistan	24.15	Q
2	1	4	Oleksii Virchenko	Ukraine	24.19	Q
3	2	5	Kyrylo Garashchenko	Ukraine	24.61	Q
4	1	3	Muzaffar Tursunkhujaev	Uzbekistan	24.63	Q
5	1	5	Taliso Engel	Germany	24.75	Q
6	2	6	Kamil Rzetelski	Poland	25.20	Q
7	1	6	Douglas Matera	Brazil	25.50	Q
8	2	2	Ivan Salguero Oteiza	Spain	25.51	Q
9	1	2	Enrique José Alhambra Mollar	Spain	26.04	
10	2	7	Guilherme Batista Silva	Brazil	26.30	
	2	3	Nicolas-Guy Turbide	Canada	DNS	

Final

The final was held on 16 June 2022.

Rank	Athlete	Nation	Result	Notes
1st place, gold medalist(s)	Oleksii Virchenko	Ukraine	24.03	
2nd place, silver medalist(s)	Kyrylo Garashchenko	Ukraine	24.35	
3rd place, bronze medalist(s)	Islam Aslanov	Uzbekistan	24.38	
4	Taliso Engel	Germany	24.53	
5	Muzaffar Tursunkhujaev	Uzbekistan	24.65	
6	Douglas Matera	Brazil	25.17	
7	Kamil Rzetelski	Poland	25.36	
8	Ivan Salguero Oteiza	Spain	25.47	
