= Swimming at the 2020 Summer Paralympics – Men's 200 metre freestyle S4 =

Men's 200 metre freestyle S4 at the XVI Paralympic Games
- Venue: Tokyo Aquatics Centre
- Dates: 30 August 2021
- Competitors: 15 from 12 nations

Medalists
| 1st place, gold medalist(s) | | Ami Omer Dadaon | Israel |
| 2nd place, silver medalist(s) | | Takayuki Suzuki | Japan |
| 3rd place, bronze medalist(s) | | Roman Zhdanov | RPC |

The men's 200 metre freestyle S4 event at the 2020 Paralympic Games took place on 30 August 2021, at the Tokyo Aquatics Centre.

== Heats ==
The swimmers with the top eight times, regardless of heat, advanced to the final.

| Rank | Heat | Lane | Name | Nationality | Time | Notes |
|---|---|---|---|---|---|---|
| 1 | 2 | 4 | Ami Omer Dadaon | Israel | 2:56.66 | Q |
| 2 | 2 | 5 | Takayuki Suzuki | Japan | 3:03.47 | Q |
| 3 | 1 | 6 | Ángel de Jesús Camacho Ramírez | Mexico | 3:05.26 | Q |
| 4 | 1 | 3 | Luigi Beggiato | Italy | 3:05.40 | Q |
| 5 | 1 | 4 | Roman Zhdanov | RPC | 3:06.06 | Q |
| 6 | 1 | 5 | Gustavo Sánchez Martínez | Mexico | 3:07.79 | Q |
| 7 | 2 | 3 | Jo Giseong | South Korea | 3:13.77 | Q |
| 8 | 2 | 6 | David Smétanine | France | 3:14.09 | Q |
| 9 | 2 | 1 | Lyndon Longhorne | Great Britain | 3:25.07 | |
| 10 | 2 | 2 | Xavier Torres | Spain | 3:25.84 | |
| 11 | 1 | 2 | Maksim Emelianov | RPC | 3:27.63 | |
| 12 | 1 | 7 | Tomi Brajša | Croatia | 3:32.14 | |
| 13 | 2 | 7 | Ariel Malyar | Israel | 3:38.51 | |
| 14 | 1 | 1 | Andreas Ernhofer | Austria | 3:39.44 | |
| | 2 | 8 | Eric Tobera | Brazil | DNS | |

== Final ==
200m freestyle final
| Rank | Lane | Name | Nationality | Time | Notes |
|---|---|---|---|---|---|
| 1st place, gold medalist(s) | 4 | Ami Omer Dadaon | Israel | 2:44.84 | WR |
| 2nd place, silver medalist(s) | 5 | Takayuki Suzuki | Japan | 2:55.15 | |
| 3rd place, bronze medalist(s) | 2 | Roman Zhdanov | RPC | 2:58.48 | |
| 4 | 6 | Luigi Beggiato | Italy | 3:00.85 | |
| 5 | 3 | Ángel de Jesús Camacho Ramírez | Mexico | 3:01.50 | |
| 6 | 7 | Gustavo Sánchez Martínez | Mexico | 3:09.78 | |
| 7 | 1 | Jo Giseong | South Korea | 3:13.81 | |
| 8 | 8 | David Smetanine | France | 3:14.81 | |
