= Swimming at the 2020 Summer Paralympics – Men's 100 metre freestyle S4 =

Men's 100 metre freestyle S4 at the XVI Paralympic Games
- Venue: Tokyo Aquatics Centre
- Dates: 26 August 2021
- Competitors: 15 from 11 nations

Medalists
1st place, gold medalist(s)		Takayuki Suzuki	Japan
2nd place, silver medalist(s)		Luigi Beggiato	Italy
3rd place, bronze medalist(s)		Roman Zhdanov	RPC

The Men's 100 metre freestyle S4 event at the 2020 Paralympic Games took place on 26 August 2021, at the Tokyo Aquatics Centre.

== Heats ==
The swimmers with the top 8 times, regardless of heat, advanced to the final.

Rank	Heat	Lane	Name	Nationality	Time	Notes
1	2	3	Luigi Beggiato	Italy	1:22.93	Q
2	2	5	Takayuki Suzuki	Japan	1:27.48	Q
3	1	6	Angel Camocho Ramirez	Mexico	1:28.02	Q
4	1	4	Roman Zhdanov	RPC	1:29.60	Q
5	1	5	Jo Giseong	South Korea	1:30.41	Q
6	2	6	Gustavo Sánchez Martínez	Mexico	1:30.80	Q
7	1	3	David Smetanine	France	1:32.52	Q
8	2	7	Lyndon Longhorne	Great Britain	1:34.27	Q
9	2	2	Ariel Malyar	Israel	1:36.04	
10	1	2	Eric Tobera	Brazil	1:36.20	
11	2	1	Andreas Ernhofer	Austria	1:38.49	
12	1	7	Vincenzo Boni	Italy	1:39.56	
13	1	1	Maksim Emelianov	RPC	1:42.31	
14	2	8	Miguel Martinez Tajuelo	Spain	1:53.89	
	2	4	Ami Omer Dadaon	Israel	DSQ	

== Final ==
100m freestyle final
Rank	Lane	Name	Nationality	Time	Notes
1st place, gold medalist(s)	5	Takayuki Suzuki	Japan	1:21.58	PR
2nd place, silver medalist(s)	4	Luigi Beggiato	Italy	1:23.21	
3rd place, bronze medalist(s)	6	Roman Zhdanov	RPC	1:26.95	
4	3	Angel Camocho Ramirez	Mexico	1:27.71	
5	2	Jo Giseong	South Korea	1:28.46	
6	1	David Smetanine	France	1:29.47	
7	8	Lyndon Longhorne	Great Britain	1:33.30	
8	7	Gustavo Sánchez Martínez	Mexico	1:35.55	
