= 2025 World Para Swimming Championships – Men's 50 metre breaststroke =

The men's 50 metre breaststroke events at the 2025 World Para Swimming Championships will be held at the Singapore Aquatic Centre between 21 and 27 September 2025. There are two races at this distance.

== Schedule ==
The 50 metre breaststroke events for men will be held across the following schedule:

men's 50 metre breaststroke
Day	Date	Classifications
Day 1	21 Sept	SB2, SB3
Day 2	22 Sept	
Day 3	23 Sept	
Day 4	24 Spt	
Day 5	25 Sept	
Day 6	26 Sept	
Day 7	27 Sept	

== Medal summary ==
Event	Gold	Silver	Bronze
SB2	Jose Arnulfo Castorena Velez; Mexico	Ismail Barlov; Bosnia and Herzegovina	Igor Bobyrev; Individual Neutral Athletes
SB3	Ami Omer Dadaon; Israel	Takayuki Suzuki; Japan	Efrem Morelli; Italy

== Race summaries ==
=== SB2 ===
The men's 50 metre breaststroke SB2 event will be held on 21 September. SB1 swimmers are eligible for this event.

The relevant records at the beginning of the event were as follows:

Record	Athlete	Time	Date	City	Country
SB1
World	Aliaksei Talai (BLR)	1:18.42	2021-04-17	Lignano Sabbiadoro	Italy
Championship	Aliaksei Talai (BLR)	1:26.09	2019-09-09	London	United Kingdom
Americas	Curtis Lovejoy (USA)	1:29.94	2009-05-25	Manchester	United Kingdom
European	Aliaksei Talai (BLR)	1:18.42	2021-04-17	Lignano Sabbiadoro	Italy
SB2
World	Huang Wenpan (CHN)	0:50.65	2016-09-14	Rio de Janeiro	Brazil
Championship	Huang Wenpan (CHN)	0:52.81	2017-12-05	Mexico City	Mexico
African	Amr Abdalla (EGY)	1:54.98	2021-06-19	Berlin	Germany
Americas	Jose Arnulfo Castorena Velez (MEX)	0:55.92	2023-04-20	Minneapolis	United States
Asian	Huang Wenpan (CHN)	0:50.65	2016-09-14	Rio de Janeiro	Brazil
European	Dmytro Vynohradets (UKR)	0:55.03	2016-09-14	Rio de Janeiro	Brazil
Oceania	Grant Patterson (AUS)	1:00.76	2019-09-09	London	United Kingdom

==== Heats ====
Eleven swimmers will take part, with the top eight progressing to the final.

Rank	Heat	Lane	Athlete	Time	Note
1	1	4	José Arnulfo Castorena (MEX)	57.51	Q
2	2	5	Ismail Barlov (BIH)	59.26	Q
3	1	5	Grant Patterson (AUS)	1:04.84	Q
4	2	4	Igor Bobyrev (AIN)	1:06.07	Q
5	2	3	Emmanuele Marigliano (ITA)	1:09.77	Q
6	2	2	Methasit Nakananram (THA)	1:12.91	Q
7	2	6	Marcos Zárate (MEX)	1:13.76	Q
8	1	6	Charkorn Kaewsri (THA)	1:18.74	Q
9	1	3	Ioannis Kostakis (GRE)	1:28.89	R
10	1	2	Krzysztof Lechniak (POL)	1:32.13	R
11	2	7	Bruno Becker (BRA)	1:43.80	0

==== Final ====
Rank	Lane	Athlete	Time	Note
1st place, gold medalist(s)		José Arnulfo Castorena (MEX)	57.41	
2nd place, silver medalist(s)		Ismail Barlov (BIH)	58.55	
3rd place, bronze medalist(s)		Igor Bobyrev (AIN)	1:02.13	
4		Grant Patterson (AUS)	1:04.66	
5		Emmanuele Marigliano (ITA)	1:07.58	
6		Methasit Nakananram (THA)	1:09.39	
7		Marcos Zárate (MEX)	1:13.66	
8		Charkorn Kaewsri (THA)	1:16.73	

=== SB3 ===
The men's 50 metre breaststroke SB3 event will be held on 21 September.

The relevant records at the beginning of the event were as follows:

Record	Athlete	Time	Date	City	Country
World	Roman Zhdanov (IPC)	0:46.49	2021-08-25	Tokyo	Japan
Championship	Efrem Morelli (ITA)	0:47.49	2019-09-15	London	United Kingdom
African	Youssef Elsayed (EGY)	1:17.24	2019-04-27	Glasgow	United Kingdom
Americas	Jonathan Dieleman (CAN)	0:50.08	2016-09-14	Rio de Janeiro	Brazil
Asian	Jin Zhipeng (CHN)	0:47.54	2016-09-14	Rio de Janeiro	Brazil
European	Roman Zhdanov (IPC)	0:46.49	2021-08-25	Tokyo	Japan
Oceania	Ahmed Kelly (AUS)	0:50.88	2014-08-10	Pasadena	United States

==== Heats ====
Nine swimmers will take part, with the top eight progressing to the final.

Rank	Heat	Lane	Athlete	Time	Note
1	1	6	Ami Omer Dadaon (ISR)	49.23	Q
2	1	2	Giseong Jo (KOR)	49.79	Q
3	1	5	Miguel Luque (ESP)	50.35	Q
4	1	4	Takayuki Suzuki (JPN)	50.92	Q
5	1	3	Efrem Morelli (ITA)	51.01	Q
6	1	1	Vicente Gil (ESP)	53.34	Q
7	1	7	Andreas Ernhofer (AUT)	53.85	Q
8	1	0	Artur Apostolaki (AIN)	54.31	Q
9	1	8	Dimitri Granjux (FRA)	56.91	R
10	1	2	Krzysztof Lechniak (POL)	1:32.13	R
11	2	7	Bruno Becker (BRA)	1:43.80	

==== Final ====
Rank	Lane	Athlete	Time	Note
1st place, gold medalist(s)	4	Ami Omer Dadaon (ISR)	48.17	
2nd place, silver medalist(s)	6	Takayuki Suzuki (JPN)	48.53	
3rd place, bronze medalist(s)	2	Efrem Morelli (ITA)	49.43	
4	5	Jo Gi-seong (KOR)	49.54	
5	3	Miguel Luque Ávila (ESP)	49.59	
6	1	Andreas Ernhofer (AUT)	52.60	
7	7	Vicente Gil Ros (ESP)	53.16	
8	8	Artur Apostolaki (AIN)	53.91	
