= Swimming at the 2020 Summer Paralympics – Men's 50 metre breaststroke SB3 =

Men's 50 metre breaststroke SB3 at the XVI Paralympic Games
- Venue: Tokyo Aquatics Centre
- Dates: 25 August 2021
- Competitors: 12 from 10 nations

Medalists
1st place, gold medalist(s)		Roman Zhdanov	RPC
2nd place, silver medalist(s)		Miguel Luque Ávila	Spain
3rd place, bronze medalist(s)		Takayuki Suzuki	Japan

The Men's 50 metre breaststroke SB3 event at the 2020 Paralympic Games took place on 25 August 2021, at the Tokyo Aquatics Centre.

== Heats ==
The swimmers with the top 8 times, regardless of heat, advanced to the final.

Rank	Heat	Lane	Name	Nationality	Time	Notes
1	2	4	Efrem Morelli	Italy	49.35	Q
2	1	5	Miguel Luque Ávila	Spain	50.06	Q
3	1	4	Roman Zhdanov	RPC	50.44	Q
4	2	3	Maksim Emelianov	RPC	51.33	Q
5	2	5	Tatayuki Suzuki	Japan	51.75	Q
6	1	3	Jo Giseong	South Korea	53.11	Q
7	2	6	Andreas Ernhofer	Austria	54.18	Q
8	1	6	Ahmed Kelly	Australia	55.45	Q
9	2	2	Gustavo Sánchez Martínez	Mexico	56.05	
10	1	2	Eric Tobera	Brazil	57.37	
11	1	7	Ronystony Cordeiro da Silva	Brazil	57.80	
12	2	7	Lyndon Longhorne	Great Britain	58.79	

== Final ==
50 metre breathstroke
Rank	Lane	Name	Nationality	Time	Notes
1st place, gold medalist(s)	3	Roman Zhdanov	RPC	46.49	WR
2nd place, silver medalist(s)	5	Miguel Luque Ávila	Spain	49.08	
3rd place, bronze medalist(s)	2	Tatayuki Suzuki	Japan	49.32	
4	4	Efrem Morelli	Italy	49.42	
5	6	Maksim Emelianov	RPC	50.63	
6	7	Jo Giseong	South Korea	51.58	
7	8	Ahmed Kelly	Australia	54.89	
8	1	Andreas Ernhofer	Austria	55.00	
