= 2023 World Para Swimming Championships – Men's 50 metre breaststroke =

The men's 50m breaststroke events at the 2023 World Para Swimming Championships were held at the Manchester Aquatics Centre between 31 July and 6 August.

== Medalists ==
Event	Gold	Silver	Bronze
SB2	José Arnulfo Castorena; Mexico	Cristopher Tronco Sánchez; Mexico	Emmanuele Marigliano; Italy
SB3	Jo Giseong; South Korea	Miguel Luque Ávila; Spain	Takayuki Suzuki; Japan

== Results ==
=== SB2 ===
Heats

Ten swimmers from seven nations took part. The swimmers with the top eight times, regardless of heat, advanced to the final.

Rank	Heat	Lane	Name	Nation	Result	Notes
1	2	4	José Arnulfo Castorena	Mexico	58.63	Q
2	2	5	Emmanuele Marigliano	Italy	1:06.35	Q
3	1	5	Ioannis Kostakis	Greece	1:06.68	Q
4	1	4	Cristopher Tronco Sánchez	Mexico	1:07.04	Q
5	2	6	Ismail Barlov	Bosnia and Herzegovina	1:07.84	Q
6	2	3	Marcos Rafael Zarate Rodriguez	Mexico	1:12.11	Q
7	1	6	Charkorn Kaewsri	Thailand	1:12.47	Q
8	2	2	Gabriel Araújo	Brazil	1:18.80	Q
9	1	2	Bruno Becker	Brazil	1:42.75	
	1	3	Daniel Ferrer Robles	Spain	DSQ	

Final

The final was held on 31 July.

Rank	Name	Nation	Result	Notes
1st place, gold medalist(s)	José Arnulfo Castorena	Mexico	57.76	
2nd place, silver medalist(s)	Cristopher Tronco Sánchez	Mexico	1:04.93	
3rd place, bronze medalist(s)	Emmanuele Marigliano	Italy	1:07.06	
4	Ioannis Kostakis	Greece	1:07.43	
5	Ismail Barlov	Bosnia and Herzegovina	1:08.77	
6	Marcos Rafael Zarate Rodriguez	Mexico	1:12.48	
7	Gabriel Araújo	Brazil	1:13.56	
8	Charkorn Kaewsri	Thailand	1:15.94	

=== SB3 ===
Final

Seven swimmers from six nations took part.

Rank	Name	Nation	Result	Notes
1st place, gold medalist(s)	Jo Giseong	South Korea	49.21	
2nd place, silver medalist(s)	Miguel Luque Ávila	Spain	49.90	
3rd place, bronze medalist(s)	Takayuki Suzuki	Japan	50.69	
4	Ami Omer Dadaon	Israel	50.94	
5	Andreas Ernhofer	Austria	51.52	
6	Ángel de Jesús Camacho Ramírez	Mexico	57.10	
7	Gustavo Sánchez Martínez	Mexico	57.41	
