= Swimming at the 2020 Summer Paralympics – Men's 50 metre freestyle S4 =

Men's 50 metre freestyle S4 at the XVI Paralympic Games
- Venue: Tokyo Aquatics Centre
- Dates: 2 September 2021
- Competitors: 17 from 14 nations

Medalists
1st place, gold medalist(s)		Ami Omer Dadaon	Israel
2nd place, silver medalist(s)		Takayuki Suzuki	Japan
3rd place, bronze medalist(s)		Luigi Beggiato	Italy

The men's 50 metre freestyle S4 event at the 2020 Paralympic Games took place on 2 September 2021, at the Tokyo Aquatics Centre.

== Heats ==
The swimmers with the top eight times, regardless of heat, advanced to the final.

Rank	Heat	Lane	Name	Nationality	Time	Notes
1	2	4	Takayuki Suzuki	Japan	38.25	Q
2	3	4	Ami Omer Dadaon	Israel	38.42	Q
3	1	4	Luigi Beggiato	Italy	38.76	Q
4	2	6	Ángel de Jesús Camacho Ramírez	Mexico	39.74	Q
5	3	6	Liu Benying	China	39.98	Q
6	2	3	Ariel Malyar	Israel	40.48	Q
7	1	6	Arnošt Petráček	Czech Republic	40.64	Q
8	3	3	Eric Tobera	Brazil	41.34	Q
9	2	5	Jo Giseong	South Korea	41.78	
10	2	2	Ronystony Cordeiro	Brazil	41.91	
11	3	5	Roman Zhdanov	RPC	42.18	
12	1	3	David Smétanine	France	42.68	
13	3	2	Gustavo Sánchez Martínez	Mexico	42.89	
14	1	5	Matz Topkin	Estonia	43.91	
15	1	2	Andreas Ernhofer	Austria	45.10	
16	3	7	Lyndon Longhorne	Great Britain	45.78	
17	2	7	Tomi Brajša	Croatia	48.33	

== Final ==
50m freestyle final
Rank	Lane	Name	Nationality	Time	Notes
1st place, gold medalist(s)	5	Ami Omer Dadaon	Israel	37.21	PR
2nd place, silver medalist(s)	4	Takayuki Suzuki	Japan	37.70	
3rd place, bronze medalist(s)	3	Luigi Beggiato	Italy	38.12	
4	6	Ángel de Jesús Camacho Ramírez	Mexico	39.37	
5	2	Liu Benying	China	39.98	
6	8	Eric Tobera	Brazil	41.46	
7	7	Ariel Malyar	Israel	41.70	
	1	Arnošt Petráček	Czech Republic	DSQ	
