= 2019 World Para Swimming Championships – Men's 150 metre individual medley =

The men's 150m individual medley events at the 2019 World Para Swimming Championships were held in the London Aquatics Centre at the Queen Elizabeth Olympic Park in London between 9–15 September.

== Medalists ==
Event	Gold	Silver	Bronze
SM3	Diego Lopez Diaz; Mexico	Ahmed Kelly; Australia	Grant Patterson; Australia
SM4	Roman Zhdanov; Russia	Ami Omer Dadaon; Israel	Takayuki Suzuki; Japan
