= 2018 World Para Swimming European Championships – Men's 150 metres individual medley =

The men's 150 metres individual medley at the 2018 World Para Swimming European Championships was held at the National Aquatic Centre in Dublin from 13 to 19 August. 2 classification finals are held in all over this event.

== Medalists ==
Event	Gold		Silver		Bronze	
S3	Ioannis Kostakis (GRE)	3:36.61	Mikael Fredriksson (SWE)	3:47.01	Iyad Shalabi (ISR)	5:03.28 WR(S1)
S4	Ami Omer Dadaon (ISR)	2:39.95	Efrem Morelli (ITA)	2:46.13	Dmytro Vynohradets (UKR)	2:48.54
WR world record | AR area record | CR championship record | GR games record | NR national record | OR Olympic record | PB personal best | SB season best | WL world leading (in a given season)

== See also ==
- List of IPC world records in swimming
