= 2019 World Para Swimming Championships – Men's 50 metre breaststroke =

The men's 50m breaststroke events at the 2019 World Para Swimming Championships were held in the London Aquatics Centre at the Queen Elizabeth Olympic Park in London between 9–15 September.

== Medalists ==
Event	Gold	Silver	Bronze
SB2	Arnulfo Castorena; Mexico	Grant Patterson; Australia	Ioannis Kostakis; Greece
SB3	Efrem Morelli; Italy	Takayuki Suzuki; Japan	Roman Zhdanov; Russia
