= 2019 World Para Swimming Championships – Men's 200 metre freestyle =

The men's 200m freestyle events at the 2019 World Para Swimming Championships were held in the London Aquatics Centre at the Queen Elizabeth Olympic Park in London between 9–15 September.

== Medalists ==
Event	Gold	Silver	Bronze
S2	Alexander Makarov; Russia	Alberto Abarza; Chile	Vladimir Danilenko; Russia
S3	Diego Lopez Diaz; Mexico	Denys Ostapchenko; Ukraine	Zou Liankang; China
S4	Roman Zhdanov; Russia	Takayuki Suzuki; Japan	Ami Omer Dadaon; Israel
S5	Francesco Bocciardo; Italy	Antoni Ponce Bertran; Spain	Theo Curin; France
S14	Reece Dunn; Great Britain	Thomas Hamer; Great Britain	Jordan Catchpole; Great Britain
