= Swimming at the 2020 Summer Paralympics – Men's 150 metre individual medley SM4 =

Men's 150 metre individual medley SM4 at the XVI Paralympic Games
- Venue: Tokyo Aquatics Centre
- Dates: 28 August 2021
- Competitors: 13 from 10 nations

Medalists
1st place, gold medalist(s)		Roman Zhdanov	RPC
2nd place, silver medalist(s)		Ami Omer Dadaon	Israel
3rd place, bronze medalist(s)		Takayuki Suzuki	Japan

The men's 150 metre individual medley SM4 event at the 2020 Paralympic Games took place on 28 August 2021, at the Tokyo Aquatics Centre.

== Heats ==
The swimmers with the top eight times, regardless of heat, advanced to the final.

Rank	Heat	Lane	Name	Nationality	Time	Notes
1	2	4	Roman Zhdanov	RPC	2:29.83	Q
2	1	4	Ami Omer Dadaon	Israel	2:33.92	Q
3	2	5	Takayuki Suzuki	Japan	2:45.77	Q
4	3	3	Miguel Luque Ávila	Spain	2:46.89	Q
5	2	2	Dmytro Vynohradets	Ukraine	2:47.21	Q
6	2	6	Xavier Torres	Spain	2:49.27	Q
7	1	5	Efrem Morelli	Italy	2:50.38	Q
8	2	1	Liu Benying	China	2:50.48	Q
9	1	2	Ángel de Jesús Camacho Ramírez	Mexico	2:51.49	
10	1	3	Andreas Ernhofer	Austria	2:51.58	
11	1	6	Gustavo Sánchez Martínez	Mexico	2:52.35	
12	1	7	Lyndon Longhorne	Great Britain	2:52.76	
13	2	7	Maksim Emelianov	RPC	2:54.56	

== Final ==
150m individual medley final
Rank	Lane	Name	Nationality	Time	Notes
1st place, gold medalist(s)	4	Roman Zhdanov	RPC	2:21.17	WR
2nd place, silver medalist(s)	5	Ami Omer Dadaon	Israel	2:29.48	
3rd place, bronze medalist(s)	3	Takayuki Suzuki	Japan	2:40.53	
4	6	Miguel Luque Ávila	Spain	2:45.78	
5	2	Dmytro Vynohradets	Ukraine	2:46.31	
6	7	Xavier Torres	Spain	2:47.74	
7	1	Efrem Morelli	Italy	2:48.63	
-	8	Liu Benying	China	DSQ	
