= 2018 World Para Swimming European Championships – Men's 200 metres freestyle =

The men's 200 metres freestyle at the 2018 World Para Swimming European Championships was held at the National Aquatic Centre in Dublin from 13 to 19 August. 5 classification finals are held in all over this event.

== Medalists ==
Event	Gold		Silver		Bronze	
S2	Aristeidis Makrodimitris (GRE)	4:53.06	Roman Bondarenko (UKR)	5:02.24	Jacek Czech (POL)	5.08.39
S3	Vincenzo Boni (ITA)	3:31.38	Denys Ostapchenko (UKR)	3:42.03	Miguel Angel Martinez Tajuelo (ESP)	3:49.57
S4	Michael Schoenmaker (NED)	3:07.12	Ami Omer Dadaon (ISR)	3:10.76	Darko Đurić (SLO)	3:13.86
S5	Francesco Bocciardo (ITA)	2:23.65 WR	Antonio Fantin (ITA)	2:26.53	Antoni Ponce Bertran (ESP)	2:34.18
S14	Tom Hamer (GBR)	1:55.71 WR	Jordan Catchpole (GBR)	1:59.64	Michiel Jorink (NED)	2:01.16
WR world record | AR area record | CR championship record | GR games record | NR national record | OR Olympic record | PB personal best | SB season best | WL world leading (in a given season)

== See also ==
- List of IPC world records in swimming
