= 2023 World Para Swimming Championships – Men's 150 metre individual medley =

The men's 150m individual medley events at the 2023 World Para Swimming Championships were held at the Manchester Aquatics Centre between 31 July and 6 August.

== Medalists ==
Event	Gold	Silver	Bronze
SM3	Ahmed Kelly; Australia	Marcos Zárate; Mexico	Emmanuele Marigliano; Italy
SM4	Ami Omer Dadaon; Israel	Jo Giseong; South Korea	Angel de Jesus Camacho Ramirez; Mexico

== Results ==
=== SM3 ===
Heats
Rank	Heat	Lane	Name	Nation	Result	Notes
1	2	4	Ahmed Kelly	Australia	3:03.19	Q
2	2	5	Marcos Zárate	Mexico	3:18.87	Q
3	1	5	Emmanuele Marigliano	Italy	3:27.27	Q
4	2	3	Diego López Díaz	Mexico	3:31.02	Q
5	1	3	Ioannis Kostakis	Greece	3:41.73	Q
6	1	6	Ismail Barlov	Bosnia and Herzegovina	3:45.11	Q
4	2	6	Charkorn Kaewsri	Thailand	3:49.78	Q
8	1	4	Daniel Ferrer Robles	Spain	3:55.05	Q
9	2	2	Krzysztof Lechniak	Poland	3:59.30	
10	1	2	Youssef Elsayed	Egypt	4:30.84	

Finals
Rank	Name	Nation	Result	Notes
1	Ahmed Kelly	Australia	2:58.59	OC (Oceanic record)
2	Marcos Zárate	Mexico	3:19.28	
3	Emmanuele Marigliano	Italy	3:29.03	
4	Daniel Ferrer Robles	Spain	3:33.04	
5	Diego López Díaz	Mexico	3:36.20	
6	Ioannis Kostakis	Greece	3:37.77	
7	Ismail Barlov	Bosnia and Herzegovina	3:40.35	
8	Charkorn Kaewsri	Thailand	3:51.59	

=== SM4 ===
Heats
Rank	Heat	Lane	Name	Nation	Result	Notes
1	2	4	Ami Omer Dadaon	Israel	2:36.45	Q
2	1	4	Jo Giseong	South Korea	2:38.04	Q
3	1	3	Andreas Ernhofer	Austria	2:47.64	Q
4	1	5	Gustavo Ramon Sanchez Martinez	Mexico	2:47.95	Q
5	2	6	Dmytro Vynohradets	Ukraine	2:48.62	Q
6	2	5	Ángel de Jesús Camacho Ramírez	Mexico	2:48.82	Q
7	2	3	Miguel Luque	Spain	2:58.38	Q
8	1	6	Jesus Hernandez Hernandez	Mexico	3:02.93	Q
9	2	2	Nicolas Carlos Ricci	Argentina	3:14.41	

Finals
Rank	Name	Nation	Result	Notes
1	Ami Omer Dadaon	Israel	2:32.67	
2	Jo Giseong	South Korea	2:34.15	
3	Ángel de Jesús Camacho Ramírez	Mexico	2:40.51	
4	Andreas Ernhofer	Austria	2:45.49	
5	Dmytro Vynohradets	Ukraine	2:46.66	
6	Miguel Luque	Spain	2:49.63	
7	Gustavo Ramon Sanchez Martinez	Mexico	2:51.10	
8	Jesus Hernandez Hernandez	Mexico	3:03.58	
