= 2022 World Para Swimming Championships – Men's 150 metre individual medley =

The men's 150m individual medley events at the 2022 World Para Swimming Championships were held at the Penteada Olympic Swimming Complex in Madeira between 12–18 June.

== Medalists ==
Event	Gold	Silver	Bronze
SM3	Jesús Hernández Hernández; Mexico	Josia Topf; Germany	Grant Patterson; Australia
SM4	Ami Omer Dadaon; Israel	Andreas Ernhofer; Austria	Miguel Luque Ávila; Spain

== Results ==
=== SM3 ===
Heats

11 swimmers from 11 nations took part. The swimmers with the top eight times, regardless of heat, advanced to the final.

Rank	Heat	Lane	Name	Nation	Result	Notes
1	2	4	Jesús Hernández Hernández	Mexico	3:00.13	Q
2	1	4	Grant Patterson	Australia	3:12.54	Q
3	2	3	Josia Topf	Germany	3:15.93	Q
4	1	5	Marcos Rafael Zarate Rodriguez	Mexico	3:22.97	Q
5	1	3	Emmanuele Marigliano	Italy	3:30.60	Q
6	1	6	Ioannis Kostakis	Greece	3:40.75	Q
7	2	2	Charkorn Kaewsri	Thailand	3:46.20	Q
8	1	2	Youssef Elsayed	Egypt	4:13.68	Q
9	2	2	Patricio Tse Anibal Lopez Fernandez	Dominican Republic	5:05.41	
	2	5	Diego López Díaz	Mexico	DNS	
	2	6	Daniel Ferrer Robles	Spain	DNS	

Final

The final was held on 13 June 2022.

Rank	Athlete	Nation	Result	Notes
1st place, gold medalist(s)	Jesús Hernández Hernández	Mexico	3:02.69	
2nd place, silver medalist(s)	Josia Topf	Germany	3:11.21	
3rd place, bronze medalist(s)	Grant Patterson	Australia	3:13.17	
4	Marcos Rafael Zarate Rodriguez	Mexico	3:20.33	
5	Emmanuele Marigliano	Italy	3:23.84	
6	Ioannis Kostakis	Greece	3:39.12	
	Charkorn Kaewsri	Thailand	DSQ	
	Youssef Elsayed	Egypt	DSQ	
