= Igor Bobyrev =

Russian Paralympic swimmer (born 2002)

Personal information
- Native name: Игорь Бобырев
- Nationality: Russian
- Born: 6 March 2002 (age 24)

Sport
- Sport: Para swimming
- Disability class: S3, SB2
Medal record
Men's para swimming
Representing Neutral Paralympic Athletes
World Championships
Bronze medal – third place	2025 Singapore	50 m breaststroke SB2
Representing Russia
European Championships
Gold medal – first place	2026 Kocaeli	50 m breaststroke SB2

Igor Bobyrev (Russian: Игорь Бобырев, born 6 March 2002) is a Russian Paralympic swimmer.

== Career ==
In September 2025, Bobyrev competed at the 2025 World Para Swimming Championships and won a bronze medal in the 50 metre breaststroke SB2 event with a time of 1:02.13.

In April 2026, he competed at the Russian Championships and won a gold medal in the 50 metre breaststroke with a world record time of 59.98 seconds. He also set a Russian record in the 50 metre freestyle with a time of 45.00 seconds. In September 2026, he competed at the 2026 World Para Swimming European Championships and won a gold medal in the 50 metre breaststroke SB2 event.
