= Ahmed Kelly =

Australian Paralympic swimmer

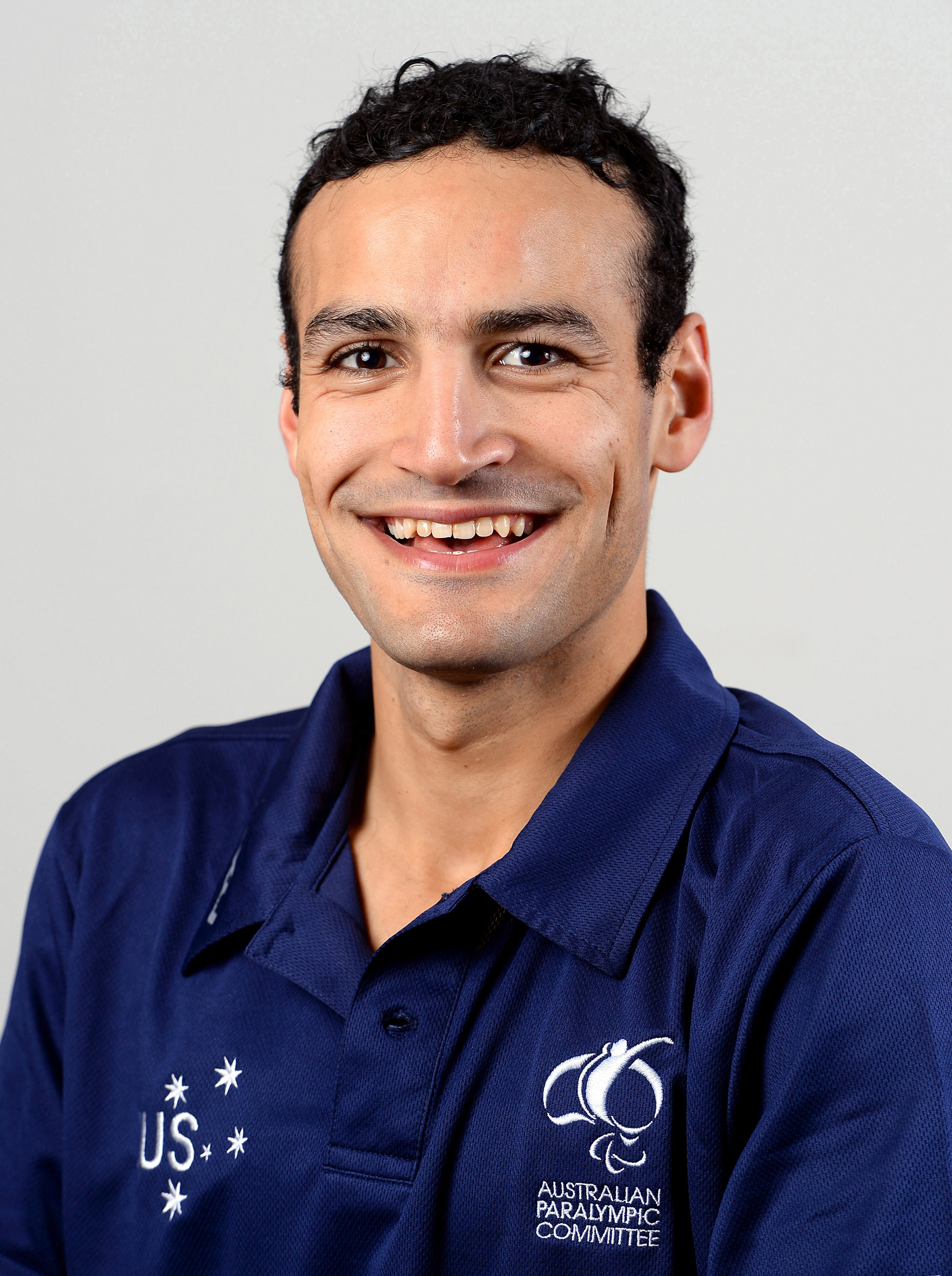
- 2016 Australian Paralympic team portrait of Kelly

Personal information
- Full name: Ahmed Kelly
- Nickname: Liquid Nails
- Nationality: Australian
- Born: 18 November 1991 (age 34) Baghdad, Iraq
- Education: Carey Baptist Grammar School; La Trobe University

Sport
- Sport: Swimming
- Strokes: Breaststroke
- Classifications: S4, SB3, SM4
- Club: Yarra Plenty Waves
- Coach: Alex Hirschauer
Medal record
Men's paralympic swimming
Representing Australia
Paralympic Games
Silver medal – second place	2020 Tokyo	150m ind. medley SM3
Silver medal – second place	2024 Paris	150m ind. medley SM3
World Championships
Gold medal – first place	2023 Manchester	150m ind. medley SM3
Silver medal – second place	2019 London	150m ind. medley SM3
Silver medal – second place	2025 Singapore	150m ind. medley SM3

Ahmed Kelly (born 18 November 1991) is an Iraqi-born Australian Paralympic swimmer. He has competed at four Paralympics Games, winning two silver medals.

== Biography ==
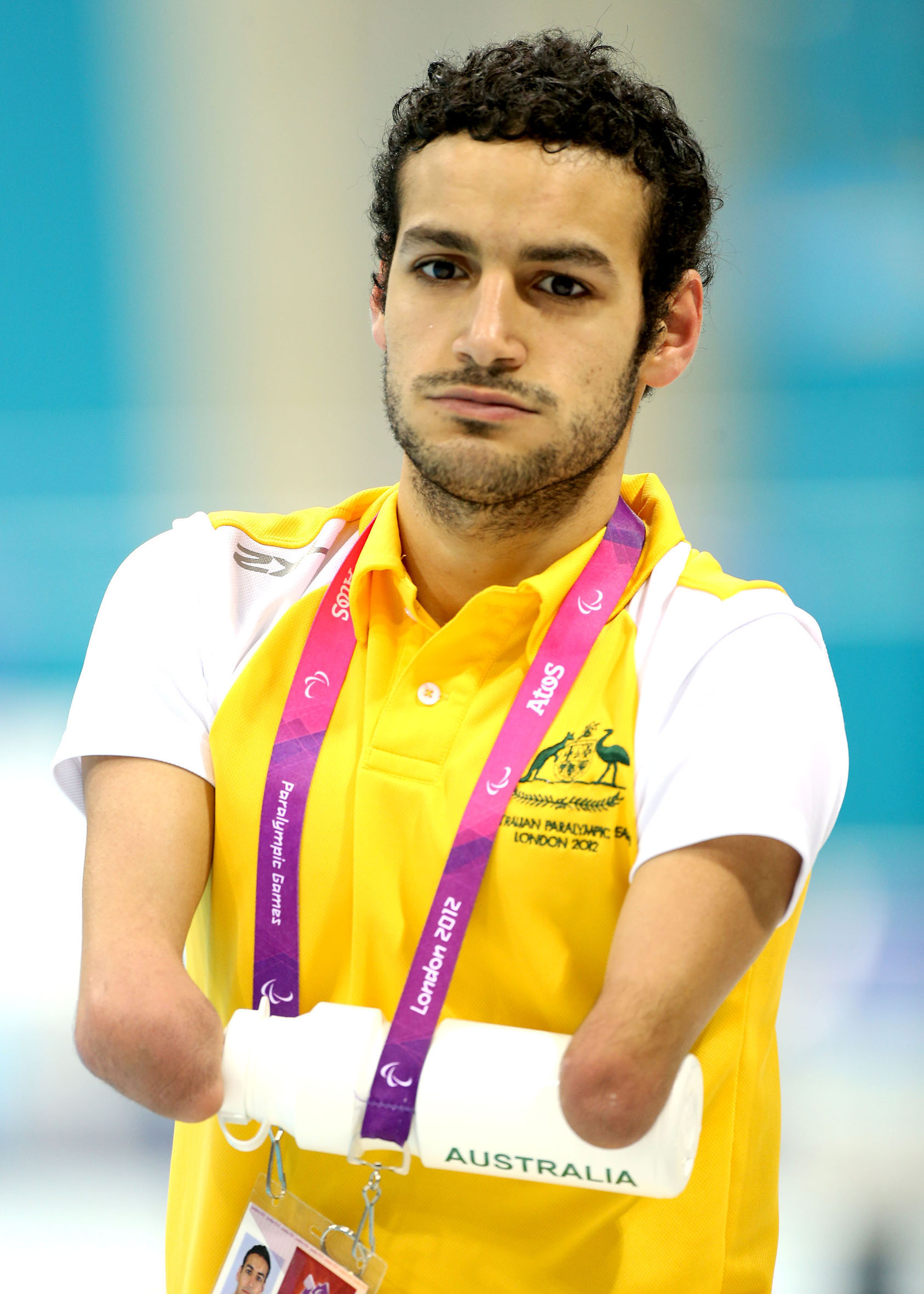
Kelly at the 2012 London Paralympics

Nicknamed "Liquid Nails", Kelly was born on 18 November 1991 in Baghdad, Iraq with a double arm and leg deficiency. Until the age of seven, he lived at Baghdad's Mother Teresa Orphanage with his brother, Emmanuel, who has a similar disability. Moira Kelly, on her own, met the brothers in 1998 and with her parents' help, brought them to Victoria, Australia, in 2000 to get medical care for their disability. Kelly's treatment involved having parts of his legs removed that were deficient, and then being fitted with prosthesis. Moira adopted the brothers in 2000. In 2009, he became an Australian citizen. Ahmed attended secondary school at Assumption College Kilmore, in Kilmore, Victoria, from year levels 7 to 10 and Carey Grammar for levels 11 and 12. His primary school was St.Patrick's Primary School Kilmore, also in Kilmore. He was featured on the ABC's "Race to London". In 2013, he commenced studying a Bachelor of Arts at La Trobe University in Melbourne and completed it in 2021.

His brother has appeared on Australia's X-Factor. He has Bangladeshi-born twin sisters who were conjoined at birth. They attend his swimming meets to cheer for Kelly.

Kelly played Australian rules football for a team in Kilmore. When playing, he did not wear prosthetic arms. He played Australian Rules for his school's Year 7/8 team.

== Swimming ==
Kelly is an S4, SB3 (breaststroke), SM4 (individual medley) classified swimmer.He has been coached by Brad Harris, Yuriy Vdovychenko and in 2024 by Alex Hirschauer. He has a scholarship with the Victorian Institute of Sport.

He started swimming in 2008, after making a switch from Australian rules football.

Kelly first represented Australia in 2009 at the Darwin-hosted Oceania Paralympic Championships.

In 2009, he competed in the Arafura Games. He competed in the 2010 Australian National Championships, finishing first in the 100 metre breaststroke event in world record time.

He repeated this feat in 2011 where he again set a world record. He represented Australia at the 2012 Summer Paralympics in four events. His best result was fourth in the Men's 50m Breaststroke SB3.

At the 2015 IPC Swimming World Championships in Glasgow, he competed in five events – Men's 50m Freestyle S4, Men's 150m Individual Medley SM4, Men's 50m Backstroke, Men's 50m Breaststroke SB3 and Men's 4 x 50m Freestyle Relay 20 Points. His best result was sixth in the Men's 50m Breaststroke SB3.

Kelly competed in four events at the 2016 Rio Paralympic Games. He placed seventh in Men's 50m Breaststroke SB3 and sixth in Mixed 4 x 50m Freestyle Relay (20 points). He also competed in Men's 50m Backstroke S3 and Men's 150m Individual Medley SM4 but didn't progress to the finals.

At the 2019 World Para Swimming Championships, London, Kelly won the silver medal in the Men's 150m Individual Medley SM3.

Kelly won his first Paralympic medal at the 2020 Tokyo Paralympics, by winning the silver medal in the Men's 150 m individual medley SM3 with a time of 3:02.23, just over 5 seconds slower than the gold medal winner Jesús Hernández Hernández of Mexico. He competed in the Men's 50 m breaststroke SB3 final and finished seventh.

At the 2023 World Para Swimming Championships, Manchester, England, he won the gold medal in the Men's 150m individual medley SM3.

Kelly competed at the 2024 Summer Paralympics in Paris, France – his fourth Summer Paralympics. He was initially disqualified after performing butterfly instead of front crawl during the freestyle leg of the Men's 150m medley SM3 heat, but was reinstated after a protest by the Australian delegation was upheld, as any stroke other than breaststroke or backstroke is permitted in the freestyle leg. He would go on to claim Silver in the final. He swam in the Men's 50 m backstroke S3 and Men's 50 m freestyle S3 but did not medal. In 2024, he was awarded a Victorian Institute of Sport Coach Award.

At the 2025 World Para Swimming Championships in Singapore, he won the silver medal in the Men's 150m medley SM3.
