= 2019 World Para Swimming Championships – Men's 50 metre backstroke =

The men's 50m backstroke events at the 2019 World Para Swimming Championships were held in the London Aquatics Centre at the Queen Elizabeth Olympic Park in London between 9–15 September.

== Medalists ==
Event	Gold	Silver	Bronze
S2	Alexander Makarov; Russia	Jacek Czech; Poland	Vladimir Danilenko; Russia
S3	Diego Lopez Diaz; Mexico	Zou Liankang; China	Liu Benying; China
S4	Cameron Leslie; New Zealand	Arnost Petracek; Czech Republic	Roman Zhdanov; Russia
S5	Wang Lichao; China	Yaroslav Semenenko; Ukraine	Daniel Dias; Brazil
