= 2019 World Para Swimming Championships =

Swimming competition

- Host city: London
- Date: 9 - 15 September
- Venue: London Aquatics Centre
- Nations: 73
- Athletes: 637

The 2019 World Para Swimming Championships was the tenth edition of the World Para Swimming Championships run by the International Paralympic Committee (IPC). The championships were held from February to June in seven countries across five continents and served as a qualifying event for Paralympic swimming at the 2020 Summer Paralympics. The event was sponsored by Allianz.

In 2017, the IPC announced that the event would be hosted in Kuching, Malaysia. However, on 27 January 2019, Malaysia were stripped of their hosting rights because their government refused to allow Israeli athletes into the country to compete.

On 15 April 2019, London, United Kingdom was announced as the new host for the championships, now rescheduled to take place from 9 - 15 September.

== Host selection ==
In September 2017, World Para Swimming (formerly IPC Swimming) granted hosting rights to Kuching, Malaysia, who prevailed over a bid from London in United Kingdom. The award was made with the understanding that they would permit all qualified athletes to compete. In 2019, as part of a solidarity move with the Palestinian National Authority, Malaysia announced that they would ban Israeli athletes from entering the event in a move that was supported by 29 Malaysian non-governmental organizations. The Malaysian Paralympic Council said they were following a Malaysian government policy to bar Israelis from competition as Malaysia bans Israeli passport holders from entering the country. After a meeting held in London, the IPC decreed that this was a politically motivated exclusion and stripped Malaysia of their hosting rights. This came after an Israel Foreign Affairs Ministry statement saying the ban of Israeli athletes was "shameful and totally opposes the Olympic spirit". Malaysian Prime Minister Mahathir Mohamad stood by the decision, calling Israel "a country which does not obey international laws" and said "I don't understand because the world has the power but still has to listen to Israel."

The IPC requested bids as stand-in hosts by 11 February. London was selected to host the championships at the Queen Elizabeth Park in April 2019.

== Participating nations ==
637 swimmers from 73 nations participated.

- Argentina (10)
- Australia (34)
- Austria (4)
- Azerbaijan (3)
- Belarus (12)
- Belgium (1)
- Brazil (26)
- Canada (18)
- Chile (3)
- China (41)
- Chinese Taipei (1)
- Colombia (6)
- Croatia (5)
- Cyprus (1)
- Czech Republic (8)
- Denmark (3)
- Dominican Republic (1)
- Egypt (8)
- El Salvador (1)
- Estonia (4)
- Finland (5)
- France (10)
- Georgia (1)
- Germany (15)
- Great Britain (24) Host nation
- Greece (14)
- Honduras (1)
- Hong Kong (8)
- Hungary (8)
- Iceland (6)
- India (1)
- Indonesia (4)
- Iran (3)
- Ireland (8)
- Israel (9)
- Italy (22)
- Japan (14)
- Kazakhstan (11)
- Kenya (2)
- Laos (1)
- Latvia (1)
- Lithuania (2)
- Malaysia (5)
- Malta (2)
- Mauritius (1)
- Mexico (17)
- Montenegro (1)
- Myanmar (1)
- Namibia (1)
- Nepal (2)
- Netherlands (11)
- New Zealand (7)
- Nigeria (1)
- Norway (4)
- Panama (1)
- Peru (2)
- Philippines (2)
- Poland (10)
- Portugal (9)
- Russia (52)
- Serbia (1)
- Singapore (5)
- Slovakia (1)
- Slovenia (1)
- South Africa (7)
- South Korea (4)
- Spain (37)
- Sweden (6)
- Switzerland (3)
- Thailand (5)
- Turkey (8)
- Uganda (1)
- Ukraine (43)
- United States (17)
- Uzbekistan (7)

== Events ==
The series was held at venues in seven countries. Events commenced on 15 February in Melbourne, Australia. Further events were held in April in Indianapolis, São Paulo and Glasgow, in May in Singapore, in May and June in Lignano Sabbiadoro, and in Berlin on 9 June.

The championships served as one of the qualifying events for swimming at the 2020 Summer Paralympics in Tokyo, Japan.

=== Medal table ===
The medals table as of day 7.

* Host nation (Great Britain)

2019 World Para Swimming Championships medal table
Rank	Nation	Gold	Silver	Bronze	Total
1	Italy (ITA)	20	18	12	50
2	Great Britain (GBR)*	19	14	14	47
3	Russia (RUS)	18	15	21	54
4	Ukraine (UKR)	17	22	16	55
5	United States (USA)	14	16	5	35
6	China (CHN)	13	11	17	41
7	Netherlands (NED)	8	8	5	21
8	Belarus (BLR)	7	1	2	10
9	Colombia (COL)	6	1	3	10
10	New Zealand (NZL)	6	1	0	7
11	Brazil (BRA)	5	6	6	17
12	Mexico (MEX)	5	1	1	7
13	Japan (JPN)	3	7	4	14
14	Spain (ESP)	3	5	6	14
15	Germany (GER)	3	2	1	6
16	Greece (GRE)	3	1	1	5
17	Australia (AUS)	2	7	14	23
18	Canada (CAN)	2	7	5	14
19	Singapore (SGP)	2	0	0	2
20	Uzbekistan (UZB)	1	4	3	8
21	Israel (ISR)	1	2	1	4
22	Hungary (HUN)	1	1	2	4
23	Poland (POL)	1	1	1	3
24	Croatia (CRO)	1	0	0	1
25	France (FRA)	0	3	6	9
26	Azerbaijan (AZE)	0	1	3	4
27	Chile (CHI)	0	1	1	2
27	Turkey (TUR)	0	1	1	2
29	Czech Republic (CZE)	0	1	0	1
29	Portugal (POR)	0	1	0	1
31	Argentina (ARG)	0	0	4	4
32	Ireland (IRL)	0	0	2	2
32	Switzerland (SUI)	0	0	2	2
34	Hong Kong (HKG)	0	0	1	1
34	Iceland (ISL)	0	0	1	1
34	Malaysia (MAS)	0	0	1	1
34	South Korea (KOR)	0	0	1	1
Totals (37 entries)		161	159	163	483

== Broken records ==
A total of 188 records were broken during the Championships: 39 World records, 55 Championship records, 22 African and Oceanian records, 21 Asian records, 17 American records and 12 European records.

=== World records ===
Event	Round	Name	Nation	Time	Date
Men's 50m breaststroke SB1	Final	Aliaksei Talai	Belarus	1:26.09	9 September
Women's 400m freestyle S12	Final	Rebecca Meyers	United States	4:22.34	9 September
Women's 400m freestyle S6	Final	Jiang Yuyan	China	5:13.32	9 September
Men's 200m freestyle S14	Final	Reece Dunn	Great Britain	1:52.96	9 September
Men's 100m freestyle S9	Final	Simone Barlaam	Italy	54.10	9 September
Men's 100m breaststroke SB5	Final	Andrei Granichka	Russia	1:27.15	9 September
Men's 100m freestyle S4	Final	Roman Zhdanov	Russia	1:21.28	10 September
Men's 100m backstroke S9	Final	Simone Barlaam	Italy	1:01.22	10 September
Women's 100m backstroke S8	Final	Alice Tai	Great Britain	1:08.04	10 September
Men's 400m freestyle S7	Final	Mark Malyar	Israel	4:33.64	10 September
Women's 100m backstroke S11	Final	Wang Xinyi	China	1:16.40	10 September
Mixed 4x50m medley relay 20pts	Final	Peng Qiuping; Song Lingling; Wang Jingang; Wang Lichao	China	2:32.59	10 September
Women's 200m individual medley SM6	Final	Maisie Summers-Newton	Great Britain	2:57.24	11 September
Men's 100m breaststroke SB14	Final	Naohide Yamaguchi	Japan	1:04.95	11 September
Women's 100m breaststroke SB11	Final	Ma Jia	China	1:22.36	11 September
Men's 100m breaststroke SB7	Final	Carlos Serrano Zárate	Colombia	1:11.31	11 September
Men's 100m backstroke S7	Final	Bohdan Hrynenko	Ukraine	1:08.92	12 September
Men's 50m backstroke S4	Heat 1	Roman Zhdanov	Russia	41.50	12 September
Men's 200m individual medley SM11	Final	Rogier Dorsman	Netherlands	2:22.02	12 September
Women's 200m individual medley SM11	Final	Liesette Bruinsma	Netherlands	2:46.49	12 September
Mixed 4x100m freestyle relay S14	Final	Jessica-Jane Applegate; Reece Dunn; Bethany Firth; Thomas Hamer	Great Britain	3:42.21	12 September
Men's 50m butterfly S5	Final	Wang Lichao	China	31.52	12 September
Women's 200m individual medley SM12	Final	Rebecca Meyers	United States	2:24.56	13 September
Men's 50m freestyle S4	Final	Cameron Leslie	New Zealand	37.14	13 September
Women's 4x100m medley relay	Final	Stephanie Millward; Toni Shaw; Alice Tai; Brock Whiston	Great Britain	4:36.31	13 September
Men's 50m backstroke S5	Final	Wang Lichao	China	32.59	14 September
Men's 200m individual medley SM14	Final	Dai Tokairin	Japan	2:08.16	14 September
Women's 200m individual medley SM8	Final	Brock Whiston	Great Britain	2:35.30	14 September
Men's 200m freestyle S4	Final	Roman Zhdanov	Russia	2:53.06	14 September
Women's 50m butterfly S6	Final	Jiang Yuyan	China	34.86	14 September
Mixed 4x100m freestyle relay	Final	Yaroslav Denysenko; Kyrylo Garashchenko; Maryna Piddubna; Anna Stetsenko	Ukraine	3:51.85	14 September
Women's 100m breaststroke SB6	Final	Liu Daomin	China	1:29.87	15 September
Women's 100m breaststroke SB8	Final	Brock Whiston	Great Britain	1:13.83	15 September
Men's 100m butterfly S14	Final	Reece Dunn	Great Britain	54.46	15 September
Women's 100m butterfly S14	Final	Valeriia Shabalina	Russia	1:03.68	15 September
Men's 50m breaststroke SB3	Final	Efrem Morelli	Italy	47.49	15 September
Men's 50m freestyle S7	Final	Andrii Trusov	Ukraine	27.07	15 September
Men's 50m freestyle S9	Final	Simone Barlaam	Italy	24.00	15 September
Women's 400m freestyle S11	Final	Liesette Bruinsma	Netherlands	5:02.19	15 September

== Schedule ==
Purple squares mark final heats scheduled.

Date →		9 Mon	10 Tues	11 Wed	12 Thurs	13 Fri	14 Sat	15 Sun
50m freestyle	Men; Details	S5; S10; S11		S12		S4; S6; S8	S3	S7; S9; S13
50m freestyle	Women; Details	S5; S10; S11		S12		S4; S6; S8		S7; S9; S13
100m freestyle	Men; Details	S8; S9	S4; S6	S13	S10	S11; S12	S7	S5
100m freestyle	Women; Details	S8; S9	S4; S6	S13	S10	S11; S12	S7	S3; S5
200m freestyle	Men; Details	S14	S5		S2		S4	S3
200m freestyle	Women; Details	S14	S5					
400m freestyle	Men; Details	S6; S13	S7	S10	S8	S9		S11
400m freestyle	Women; Details	S6; S13	S7	S10	S8	S9		S11
50m backstroke	Men; Details				S3; S4	S2	S1; S5	
50m backstroke	Women; Details				S3; S4	S2	S5	
100m backstroke	Men; Details	S12	S8; S9; S11; S13; S14	S1; S2	S6; S7		S10	
100m backstroke	Women; Details	S12	S8; S9; S11; S13; S14	S2	S6; S7		S10	
50m breaststroke	Men; Details	SB2						SB3
50m breaststroke	Women; Details							SB3
100m breaststroke	Men; Details	SB4; SB5		SB7; SB11; SB14	SB12; SB13		SB9	SB6; SB8
100m breaststroke	Women; Details	SB4; SB5		SB7; SB11; SB14	SB12; SB13		SB9	SB6; SB8
50m butterfly	Men; Details	S7			S5		S6	
50m butterfly	Women; Details	S7			S5		S6	
100m butterfly	Men; Details		S12	S8; S9		S10	S11; S13	S14
100m butterfly	Women; Details			S8; S9		S10	S13	S14
150m individual medley	Men; Details			SM4			SM3	
150m individual medley	Women; Details			SM4				
200m individual medley	Men; Details		SM10	SM6	SM11	SM7; SM13	SM8; SM9; SM14	
200m individual medley	Women; Details		SM10	SM6	SM5; SM11	SM7; SM13	SM8; SM9; SM14	
Freestyle relay	Details			Mixed; 4x50m (20pts)	Mixed; 4x50m (S14)		Mixed; 4x100m (20pts)	Men/Women; 4x100m (34pts)
Medley relay	Details		Mixed; 4x50m (20pts)			Men/Women; 4x100m (34pts)		

=== Multi-medalists ===
List of male and female multi-medalists who have won three gold medals or five medals.

==== Men ====
Name	Nation	Medals	Events
Ihar Boki	Belarus	Gold; Gold; Gold; Gold; Gold; Gold; Bronze	Men's 50m freestyle S13; Men's 100m freestyle S13; Men's 100m backstroke S13; Men's 100m butterfly S13; Men's 400m freestyle S13; Men's 200m individual medley SM13; Men's 100m breaststroke SB13
Simone Barlaam	Italy	Gold; Gold; Gold; Gold; Gold; Silver	Men's 50m freestyle S9; Men's 100m freestyle S9; Men's 100m backstroke S9; Men's 100m butterfly S9; Men's 4x100m freestyle relay Men's 4x100m medley relay
Maksym Krypak	Ukraine	Gold; Gold; Gold; Gold; Gold; Silver	Men's 100m freestyle S10; Men's 100m backstroke S10; Men's 100m butterfly S10; Men's 400m freestyle S10; Men's 200m individual medley SM10; Men's 4x100m freestyle relay
Diego López Díaz	Mexico	Gold; Gold; Gold; Gold	Men's 50m freestyle S3; Men's 50m backstroke S3; Men's 200m freestyle S3; Men's 150m individual medley SM3
Wang Lichao	China	Gold; Gold; Gold; Gold	Men's 50m backstroke S5; Men's 50m butterfly S5; Mixed 4x50m freestyle relay Mixed 4x50m medley relay
Stefano Raimondi	Italy	Gold; Gold; Gold; Silver; Silver; Silver; Silver; Silver	Men's 50m freestyle S10; Men's 100m breaststroke SB9; Men's 4x100m freestyle relay Men's 100m freestyle S10; Men's 100m backstroke S10; Men's 100m butterfly Men's 200m individual medley SM10; Men's 4x100m medley relay
Yaroslav Denysenko	Ukraine	Gold; Gold; Gold; Silver; Bronze	Men's 100m freestyle S12; Men's 100m backstroke S12; Mixed 4x100m freestyle relay Men's 50m freestyle S12; Men's 100m butterfly S12
Reece Dunn	Great Britain	Gold; Gold; Gold; Silver	Men's 100m butterfly S14; Men's 200m freestyle S14; Mixed 4x100m freestyle relay S14; Men's 200m individual medley SM14
Wang Jingang	China	Gold; Gold; Gold; Silver	Men's 50m butterfly S6; Mixed 4x50m freestyle relay Mixed 4x50m medley relay Men's 200m individual medley SM6
Roman Zhdanov	Russia	Gold; Gold; Gold; Bronze; Bronze; Bronze; Bronze	Men's 100m freestyle S4; Men's 200m freestyle S4; Men's 150m individual medley SM4; Men's 50m freestyle S4; Men's 50m backstroke S4; Men's 50m breaststroke SB3; Mixed 4x50m freestyle relay
Nelson Crispín	Colombia	Gold; Gold; Gold; Bronze; Bronze	Men's 50m freestyle S6; Men's 100m freestyle S6; Men's 100m breaststroke SB6; Men's 50m butterfly S6; Men's 200m individual medley SM6
Carlos Serrano Zárate	Colombia	Gold; Gold; Gold; Bronze	Men's 100m freestyle S7; Men's 100m breaststroke SB7; Men's 200m individual medley SM7; Men's 50m butterfly S7
Andrei Kalina	Russia	Gold; Gold; Gold	Men's 100m breaststroke SB8; Men's 200m individual medley SM9; Men's 4x100m medley relay
Alexander Makarov	Russia	Gold; Gold; Gold	Men's 50m backstroke S2; Men's 100m backstroke S2; Men's 200m freestyle S2
Dimosthenis Michalentzakis	Greece	Gold; Gold; Gold	Men's 50m freestyle S8; Men's 100m freestyle S8; Men's 100m butterfly S8
Antonio Fantin	Italy	Gold; Gold; Silver; Silver; Silver; Silver	Men's 400m freestyle S6; Men's 4x100m freestyle relay Men's 50m freestyle S6; Men's 100m freestyle S6; Mixed 4x50m freestyle relay Mixed 4x50m medley relay
Francesco Bocciardo	Italy	Gold; Gold; Silver; Silver; Bronze	Men's 100m freestyle S5; Men's 200m freestyle S5; Men's 50m freestyle S5; Mixed 4x50m freestyle relay Men's 100m breaststroke SB4
Andrii Trusov	Ukraine	Gold; Silver; Silver; Bronze; Bronze	Men's 50m freestyle S7; Men's 400m freestyle S7; Men's 4x100m freestyle relay Men's 100m freestyle S7; Men's 200m individual medley SM7
Takayuki Suzuki	Japan	Silver; Silver; Silver; Silver; Bronze	Men's 50m freestyle S4; Men's 100m freestyle S4; Men's 200m freestyle S4; Men's 50m breaststroke SB3; Men's 150m individual medley SM4

==== Women ====
Name	Nation	Medals	Events
Alice Tai	Great Britain	Gold; Gold; Gold; Gold; Gold; Gold; Gold	Women's 50m freestyle S8; Women's 100m freestyle S8; Women's 100m backstroke S8; Women's 100m butterfly S8; Women's 400m freestyle S8; Women's 4x100m freestyle relay Women's 4x100m medley relay
Carlotta Gilli	Italy	Gold; Gold; Gold; Gold; Silver; Bronze	Women's 50m freestyle S13; Women's 100m freestyle S13; Women's 100m backstroke S13; Women's 200m individual medley SM13; Women's 100m butterfly S13; Women's 400m freestyle S13
Sophie Pascoe	New Zealand	Gold; Gold; Gold; Gold	Women's 50m freestyle S9; Women's 100m freestyle S9; Women's 100m backstroke S9; Women's 100m butterfly S9
Brock Whiston	Great Britain	Gold; Gold; Gold; Gold	Women's 100m breaststroke SB8; Women's 200m individual medley SM8; Women's 4x100m freestyle relay Women's 4x100m medley relay
Valeriia Shabalina	Russia	Gold; Gold; Gold; Silver; Silver; Bronze	Women's 100m butterfly S14; Women's 200m freestyle S14; Women's 200m individual medley SM14; Women's 100m backstroke S14; Mixed 4x100m freestyle relay S14; Women's 100m breaststroke SB14
Liesette Bruinsma	Netherlands	Gold; Gold; Gold; Silver; Silver	Women's 100m freestyle S11; Women's 400m freestyle S11; Women's 200m individual medley SM11; Women's 50m freestyle S11; Women's 100m breaststroke SB11
Leanne Smith	United States	Gold; Gold; Gold; Silver	Women's 50m breaststroke SB3; Women's 100m freestyle S3; Women's 150m individual medley SM4; Women's 50m backstroke S3
Jiang Yuyan	China	Gold; Gold; Gold; Bronze; Bronze	Women's 50m butterfly S6; Women's 100m freestyle S6; Women's 400m freestyle S6; Women's 50m freestyle S6; Women's 100m backstroke S6
Tully Kearney	Great Britain	Gold; Gold; Gold	Women's 50m freestyle S5; Women's 100m freestyle S5; Women's 200m freestyle S5
Yelyzaveta Mereshko	Ukraine	Gold; Gold; Silver; Silver; Silver; Bronze	Women's 50m freestyle S6; Women's 100m breaststroke SB5; Women's 100m freestyle S6; Women's 400m freestyle S6; Women's 200m individual medley SM6; Mixed 4x50m medley relay
McKenzie Coan	United States	Gold; Gold; Silver; Silver; Silver	Women's 100m freestyle S7; Women's 400m freestyle S7; Women's 50m freestyle S7; Women's 4x100m freestyle relay Women's 4x100m medley relay
Arianna Talamona	Italy	Gold; Gold; Silver; Silver; Silver	Women's 50m butterfly S5; Women's 200m individual medley SM5; Women's 100m freestyle S5; Women's 200m freestyle S5; Mixed 4x50m freestyle relay
Toni Shaw	Great Britain	Gold; Gold; Silver; Silver; Bronze; Bronze	Women's 4x100m freestyle relay Women's 4x100m medley relay Women's 100m butterfly S9; Women's 400m freestyle S9; Women's 100m freestyle S9; Women's 200m individual medley SM9
Arjola Trimi	Italy	Gold; Gold; Silver; Silver; Bronze; Bronze	Women's 50m freestyle S4; Women's 100m freestyle S4; Mixed 4x50m freestyle relay Mixed 4x50m medley relay Women's 50m backstroke S4; Women's 150m individual medley SM4
Maryna Piddubna	Ukraine	Gold; Gold; Silver; Silver; Bronze	Women's 50m freestyle S11; Mixed 4x100m freestyle relay Women's 100m freestyle S11; Women's 200m individual medley SM11; Women's 100m backstroke S11
Aurelie Rivard	Canada	Gold; Gold; Silver; Bronze; Bronze	Women's 50m freestyle S10; Women's 100m freestyle S10; Women's 400m freestyle S10; Women's 100m backstroke S10; Women's 4x100m freestyle relay
Jessica Long	United States	Silver; Silver; Silver; Silver; Silver; Bronze	Women's 100m freestyle S8; Women's 100m butterfly S8; Women's 200m individual medley SM8; Women's 4x100m freestyle relay Women's 4x100m medley relay Women's 400m freestyle S8

== See also ==
- 2019 World Para Athletics Championships
- Swimming at the 2020 Summer Paralympics
