= Ami Omer Dadaon =

Israeli Paralympic swimmer

Ami Dadaon
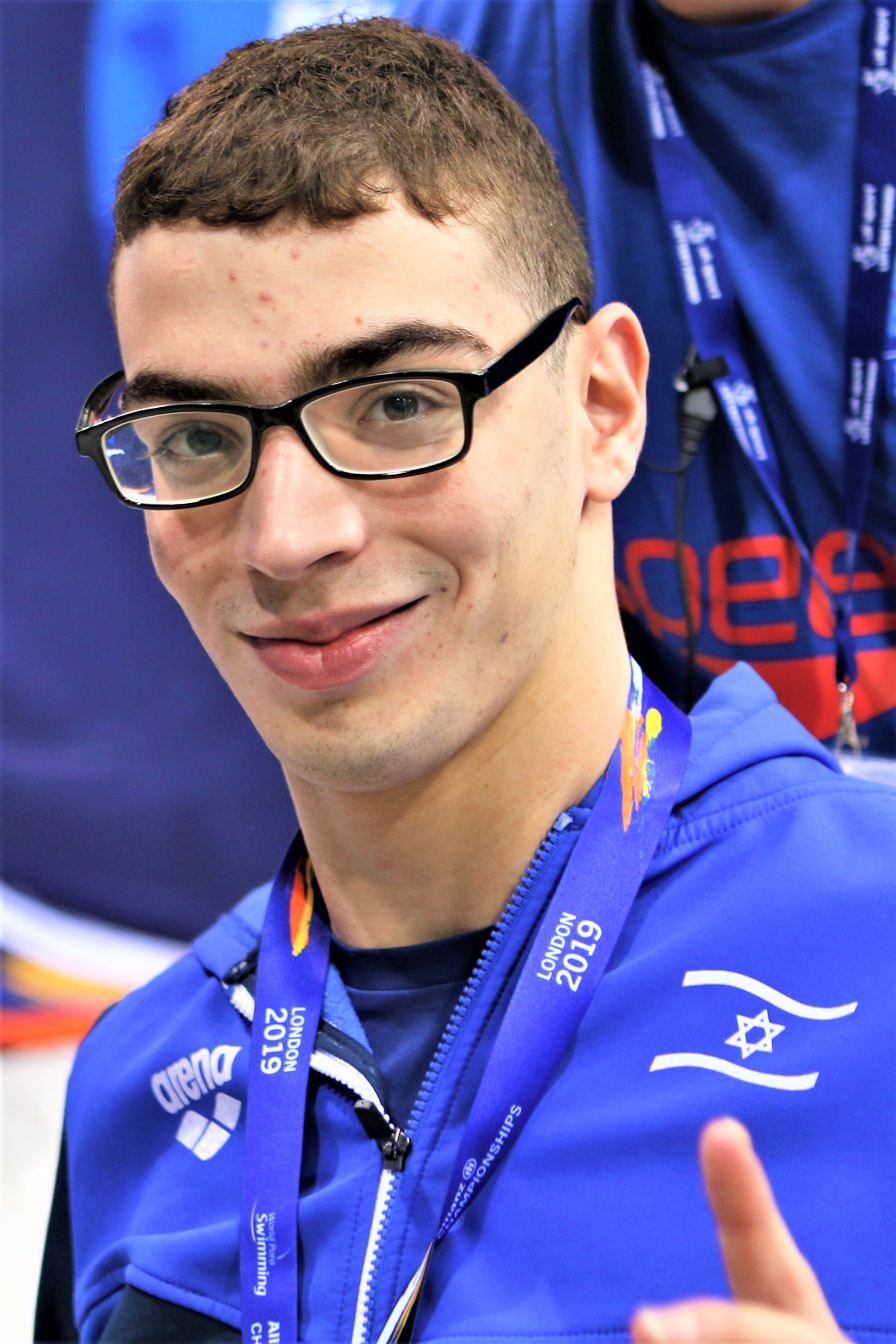

Personal information
- Native name: עמי עומר דדאון
- Full name: Ami Omer Dadaon
- Nationality: Israeli
- Born: 26 December 2000 (age 25) Haifa, Israel
- Home town: Kiryat Ata, Israel

Sport
- Country: Israel
- Sport: Para swimming
- Disability class: S4, SM4
- Club: Ilan Sport Center
- Coached by: Jacob Beninson
Medal record
Men's para swimming
Representing Israel
Event	1st	2nd	3rd
Paralympic Games	4	2	1
World Championships	10	2	1
European Championships	9	4	0
Total	23	8	2
Paralympic Games
Gold medal – first place	2020 Tokyo	50m freestyle S4
Gold medal – first place	2020 Tokyo	200m freestyle S4
Gold medal – first place	2024 Paris	100m freestyle S4
Gold medal – first place	2024 Paris	200m freestyle S4
Silver medal – second place	2020 Tokyo	150m ind. medley SM4
Silver medal – second place	2024 Paris	150 m ind. medley SM4
Bronze medal – third place	2024 Paris	50m freestyle S4
World Championships
Gold medal – first place	2022 Madeira	150m ind. medley SM4
Gold medal – first place	2022 Madeira	50m freestyle S4
Gold medal – first place	2022 Madeira	200m freestyle S4
Gold medal – first place	2023 Manchester	50m freestyle S4
Gold medal – first place	2023 Manchester	100m freestyle S4
Gold medal – first place	2023 Manchester	200m freestyle S4
Gold medal – first place	2023 Manchester	150m ind. medley SM4
Gold medal – first place	2025 Singapore	50m breaststroke SB3
Gold medal – first place	2025 Singapore	50m freestyle S4
Gold medal – first place	2025 Singapore	100m freestyle S4
Silver medal – second place	2019 London	150m ind. medley SM4
Silver medal – second place	2025 Singapore	150m ind. medley SM4
Bronze medal – third place	2019 London	200m freestyle S4
European Championships
Gold medal – first place	2018 Dublin	100m freestyle S4
Gold medal – first place	2018 Dublin	150m ind. medley S4
Gold medal – first place	2020 Funchal	50m freestyle S4
Gold medal – first place	2020 Funchal	100m freestyle S4
Gold medal – first place	2020 Funchal	200m freestyle S4
Gold medal – first place	2024 Funchal	50m freestyle S4
Gold medal – first place	2024 Funchal	100m freestyle S4
Gold medal – first place	2024 Funchal	200m freestyle S4
Gold medal – first place	2024 Funchal	50m breaststroke S4
Silver medal – second place	2018 Dublin	50m breaststroke SB3
Silver medal – second place	2018 Dublin	200m freestyle S4
Silver medal – second place	2020 Funchal	150m ind. medley SM4
Silver medal – second place	2024 Funchal	150m ind. medley SM4

Ami Omer Dadaon (Hebrew: עמי עומר דדאון; sometimes written Dadon; born 26 December 2000) is an Israeli Paralympic swimmer. He has won four gold medals at the Paralympics, ten gold medals at the World Championships, and nine gold medals at the European Championships. He represented Israel at the 2020 and 2024 Summer Paralympics.

== Early life ==
Dadaon was born in Haifa, Israel. He was born prematurely and was quadriplegic and had cerebral palsy from birth. He lives in Kiryat Ata, Israel.

== Swimming career ==
Dadaon started swimming when he was six years old. He began swimming at the Israel Association for Children with Disabilities as rehabilitation therapy. In December 2017, he was awarded the Israeli Sports Award for Young Para Athlete of the Year.

Dadaon made his World Championships debut for Israel in 2019 and won a silver medal in the 150 metre individual medley and a bronze medal in the 200 metre freestyle.

=== 2020 Summer Paralympics ===
Dadaon represented Israel at the 2020 Summer Paralympics and won gold medals in the 50 metre freestyle S4 and 200 metre freestyle S4, and a silver medal in the 150 metre individual medley SM4 event. He set a world record in the 200 metre freestyle event with a time of 2:44.84.

=== 2022–2023 ===
Dadaon competed at the 2022 World Para Swimming Championships and won gold medals in the 150 metre individual medley, 50 metre freestyle and 200 metre freestyle. He again competed at the 2023 World Para Swimming Championships and won gold medals in the 150 metre individual medley, 50 metre freestyle, 100 metre freestyle and 200 metre freestyle. He set a world record in the 100 metre freestyle event with a time of 1:18.94.

=== 2024 Summer Paralympics ===
Dadaon represented Israel at the 2024 Summer Paralympics and won a gold medal in the 100 metre freestyle S4. He established a new Paralympic record in the heats with a time of 1:19.33. He said: ""I will sing Hatikvah. That's all I wanted – to represent the people of Israel in this period and to give them hope."

He also won a gold medal in 200 metre freestyle S4, a silver medal in 150 metre individual medley SM4, and a bronze medal in the 50 metre freestyle S4 events. After he won his silver medal following the news that six Israeli hostages had been found dead in Gaza, he said: "It wasn’t an easy day for the people of Israel. It affected me, I live for Israel and for our country. We’re fighting on so many different fronts, but, at least on my own front, I hope I succeeded."

== 2025 season ==
At the 2025 World Para Swimming Championships in Singapore, Dadaon won three gold medals and one silver. He took gold in the men's 50m freestyle S4, 100m freestyle S4 and 50m breaststroke SB3, and added a silver in the 150m individual medley SM4.

== See also ==
- List of IPC world records in swimming – Men's long course
- List of Paralympic records in swimming
