= Daniel Xavier Mendes =

Brazilian Paralympic swimmer (born 2002)

Personal information
- Born: 8 April 2002 (age 24) Resende, Brazil

Sport
- Sport: Paralympic swimming
- Disability class: S6
Medal record
Men's paralympic swimming
Representing Brazil
Paralympic Games
Bronze medal – third place	2024 Paris	Mixed 4×50 m freestyle relay 20 pts

Daniel Xavier Mendes (born 8 April 2002) is a Brazilian Paralympic swimmer. He represented Brazil at the 2024 Summer Paralympics.

== Career ==
Xavier Mendes represented Brazil at the 2024 Summer Paralympics and won a bronze medal in the mixed 4x50 metre freestyle relay event.
