= Luigi Beggiato =

Italian Paralympic swimmer (born 1998)

Personal information
- National team: Italy
- Born: 7 April 1998 (age 28) Monselice, Italy

Sport
- Sport: Paralympic swimming
- Disability class: S4
Medal record
Paralympic swimming
Representing Italy
Event	1st	2nd	3rd
Paralympics	0	2	1
European Championships	0	1	2
Total	0	3	3
Paralympic Games
Silver medal – second place	2020 Tokyo	100 m freestyle S4
Silver medal – second place	2020 Tokyo	Mixed 4×50 m freestyle
Bronze medal – third place	2020 Tokyo	50 m freestyle S4
European Championships
Silver medal – second place	2020 Funchal	50 m freestyle S4
Bronze medal – third place	2020 Funchal	100 m freestyle S4
Bronze medal – third place	2020 Funchal	200 m freestyle S4

Luigi Beggiato (born 7 April 1998) is an Italian Paralympic swimmer who won a medal at 2020 Summer Paralympics.

== Career ==
Beggiato represented Italy in the men's 100 metre freestyle S4 event at the 2020 Summer Paralympics and won a silver medal. He also competed in the mixed 4 × 50 metre freestyle relay 20pts and won a silver medal.
