= Bruno Becker =

Brazilian swimmer (born 1990)

Personal information
- Full name: Bruno Becker da Silva
- Born: 17 November 1990 (age 35) Curitiba, Brazil

Sport
- Country: Brazil
- Sport: Paralympic swimming
- Disability: Phocomelia
- Disability class: S2
Medal record
Paralympic swimming
Representing Brazil
Parapan American Games
Bronze medal – third place	2019 Lima	50m freestyle S2
Bronze medal – third place	2019 Lima	100m freestyle S2
Bronze medal – third place	2019 Lima	200m freestyle S2

Bruno Becker da Silva (born 17 November 1990) is a Brazilian Paralympic swimmer who competes at international swimming competitions, He was born without his right arm and his legs are impaired. He is a triple Parapan American Games bronze medalist in freestyle swimming. He competed at the 2020 Summer Paralympics and became the first athlete from Rio do Sul to win a medal at the Parapan American Games and compete at the Paralympic Games.

== Inspiration ==
Becker began training to swim after his younger brother Marcelo drowned in a waterfall in Atalanta at the age of thirteen. Bruno described his brother as an inspiration, motivating and "would be his right arm" which Bruno was born without.
