= Takayuki Suzuki (swimmer) =

Japanese Paralympic swimmer

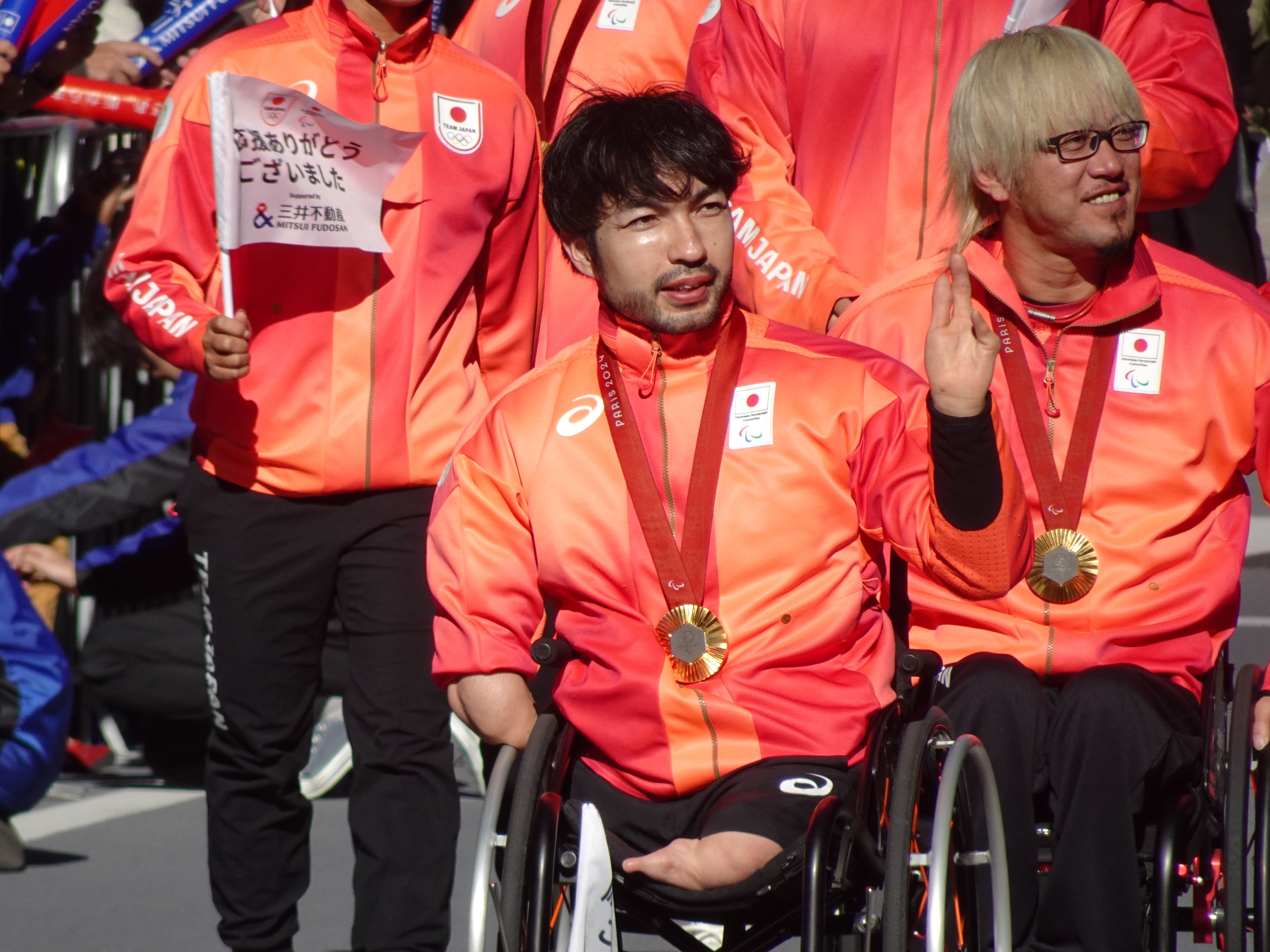
- Takayuki Suzuki at Paris 2024 Summer Olympians and Paralympians Japan National Team parade event on November 30th, 2024

Personal information
- Native name: 鈴木孝幸
- Nationality: Japan
- Born: January 23, 1987 (age 39) Hamamatsu, Shizuoka, Japan
- Height: 117 cm (3 ft 10 in)
- Weight: 45 kg (99 lb)

Sport
- Sport: Swimming
- Classifications: S5, SB3, SM4
Medal record
Men's swimming
Representing Japan
Paralympic Games
Gold medal – first place	2008 Beijing	50 m breaststroke SB3
Gold medal – first place	2020 Tokyo	100 m freestyle S4
Gold medal – first place	2024 Paris	50 m breaststroke SB3
Silver medal – second place	2004 Athens	4×50 m medley relay 20 pts
Silver medal – second place	2020 Tokyo	200 m freestyle S4
Silver medal – second place	2020 Tokyo	50 m freestyle S4
Silver medal – second place	2024 Paris	50 m freestyle S4
Silver medal – second place	2024 Paris	100 m freestyle S4
Bronze medal – third place	2008 Beijing	150 m ind. medley SM4
Bronze medal – third place	2012 London	50 m breaststroke SB3
Bronze medal – third place	2012 London	150 m ind. medley SM4
Bronze medal – third place	2020 Tokyo	50 m breaststroke SB3
Bronze medal – third place	2020 Tokyo	150 m ind. medley SM4
Bronze medal – third place	2024 Paris	200 m freestyle S4
World Championships
Silver medal – second place	2025 Singapore	50 m breaststroke SB3
Bronze medal – third place	2022 Madeira	50 m breaststroke SB3
Bronze medal – third place	2022 Madeira	50 m freestyle S4
Bronze medal – third place	2023 Manchester	50 m breaststroke SB3
Bronze medal – third place	2023 Manchester	50 m freestyle S4
Bronze medal – third place	2023 Manchester	100 m freestyle S4
Bronze medal – third place	2025 Singapore	50 m freestyle S4
Asian Para Games
Gold medal – first place	2010 Guangzhou	200 m freestyle S5
Gold medal – first place	2010 Guangzhou	100 m freestyle S5
Gold medal – first place	2018 Jakarta	200 m freestyle S4
Gold medal – first place	2018 Jakarta	100 m freestyle S4
Gold medal – first place	2018 Jakarta	50 m freestyle S4
Gold medal – first place	2018 Jakarta	50 m breaststroke SB3
Gold medal – first place	2018 Jakarta	Mixed 4×50m freestyle relay
Gold medal – first place	2022 Hangzhou	100 m freestyle S4
Gold medal – first place	2026 Aichi–Nagoya	50 m freestyle S4
Gold medal – first place	2026 Aichi–Nagoya	50 m breaststroke SB3
Bronze medal – third place	2010 Guangzhou	50 m butterfly S5

Takayuki Suzuki (鈴木 孝幸, Suzuki Takayuki; born January 23, 1987) is a Paralympic swimmer from Japan competing mainly in category events.

== Career ==
Takayuki was part of the Japanese contingent as two Paralympics, 2004 Summer Paralympics and the 2008 Summer Paralympics. In 2004 he was part of the Japanese squad that won a silver in the 4x50m medley behind a new Paralympic record set by the Brazilian team, he was also part of the squad that finished fourth in the 4x50m freestyle. Individually he finished eighth in the individual medley and seventh in the 100m freestyle. At the 2008 games Takayuki set a new world record in the heats of the 50m breaststroke going on to win the gold medal in the final, he also won a bronze in the 150m individual medley, he finished eighth in the 200m freestyle, seventh in the 100m freestyle but failed to make the final of the 50m freestyle.
