= Jo Gi-seong =

South Korean Paralympic swimmer

Jo Giseong
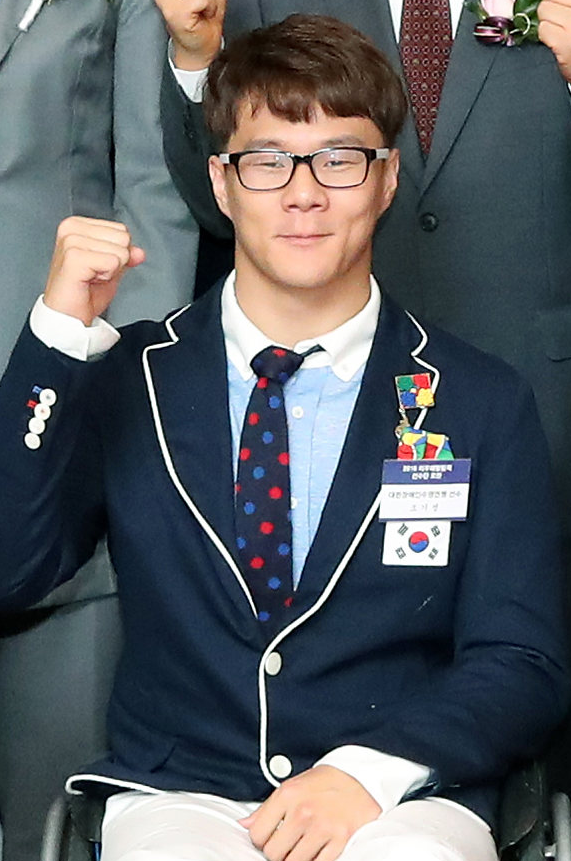

Personal information
- Nationality: South Korean
- Born: 20 December 1995 (age 30) Seoul, South Korea

Korean name
- Hangul: 조기성
- RR: Jo Giseong
- MR: Cho Kisŏng

Sport
- Country: Republic of Korea
- Sport: Swimming
- Disability class: S4
Medal record
Men's paralympic swimming
World Championships
Gold medal – first place	2015 Glasgow	100 m freestyle S4
Gold medal – first place	2015 Glasgow	200 m freestyle S4
Gold medal – first place	2023 Manchester	50 m breaststroke SB3
Silver medal – second place	2023 Manchester	150 m ind. medley SM4
Silver medal – second place	2015 Glasgow	50 m freestyle S4
Asian Para Games
Silver medal – second place	2018 Jakarta	200 m freestyle S4 (1–4)
Silver medal – second place	2018 Jakarta	100 m freestyle S4 (1–4)
Silver medal – second place	2018 Jakarta	50 m freestyle S4 (1–4)
Silver medal – second place	2022 Hangzhou	100 m freestyle S4

Jo Giseong (born 20 December 1995) is a Paralympic swimmer from South Korea competing in the S4 classification.

== Career ==
He came to prominence at the 2014 Asian Para Games and cemented his reputation with two golds at the 2015 IPC Swimming World Championships in Glasgow where he won two gold medals in the 100m and 200m freestyle events.
