= S4 (classification) =

Para-swimming classification

S4, SB3, SM4 are Para swimming classifications used for categorising swimmers based on their level of disability. Swimmers in this class have coordination problems affecting all four of their limbs, or have movement in their arms, some trunk function and no leg function. Events this class can participate in include 50m and 100m Freestyle, 200m Freestyle, 50m Backstroke, 50m Butterfly, 50m Breaststroke, and 150m Individual Medley events. The class competes at the Paralympic Games.

== Sport ==
This classification is for swimming. In the classification title, S represents Freestyle, Backstroke and Butterfly strokes. SB means breaststroke. SM means individual medley. Swimming classifications are on a gradient, with one being the most severely physically impaired to ten having the least amount of physical disability. Jane Buckley, writing for the Sporting Wheelies, describes the swimmers in this classification as having the use of "their arms and have minimal weakness in their hands but have no use of their trunk or legs; Swimmers with coordination problems affecting all limbs but predominantly in the legs; Swimmers with limb loss to 3 limbs. Increasing ability compared to Class S3."

== Disability groups ==
This class includes people with several disability types include cerebral palsy, quadriplegia and amputations.

=== Amputee ===
ISOD amputee A1, A3 and A9 swimmers may be found in this class. Prior to the 1990s, the A1, A3 and A9 classes were often grouped with other amputee classes in swimming competitions, including the Paralympic Games.

==== Lower body amputations ====
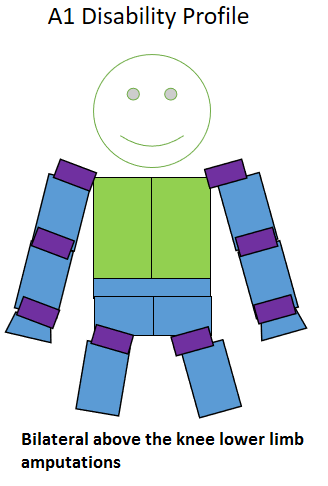
Type of amputation for an A1 classified sportsperson.

ISOD amputee A1 swimmers may be found in this class. Prior to the 1990s, the A3 class was often grouped with other amputee classes in swimming competitions, including the Paralympic Games. Swimmers in this class have a similar stroke length and stroke rate to able bodied swimmers. A study of was done comparing the performance of swimming competitors at the 1984 Summer Paralympics. It found there was no significant difference in performance in times between men and women in A2 and A3 in the 50 meter breaststroke, men and women in A2 and A3 in the 50 meter freestyle, men and women in A2, A3 and A4 in the 25 meter butterfly, and men in A2 and A3 in the 50 meter backstroke.

The nature of an A3 swimmers's amputations in this class can effect their physiology and sports performance. Because of the potential for balance issues related to having an amputation, during weight training, amputees are encouraged to use a spotter when lifting more than 15 pounds (6.8 kg). Lower limb amputations effect a person's energy cost for being mobile. To keep their oxygen consumption rate similar to people without lower limb amputations, they need to walk slower. People in this class use around 41% more oxygen to walk or run the same distance as someone without a lower limb amputation.

==== Upper and lower limb amputations ====
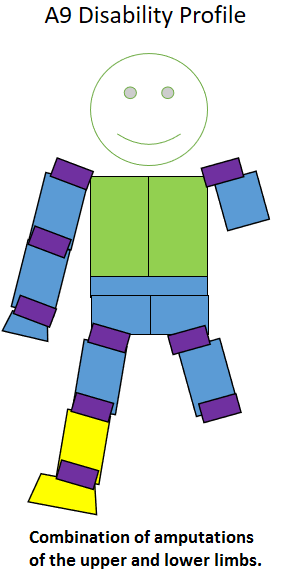
Type of amputation for an A9 classified sportsperson.

ISOD amputee A9 swimmers may be found in several classes. These include S2, S3, S4, S5 and S8. Prior to the 1990s, the A9 class was often grouped with other amputee classes in swimming competitions, including the Paralympic Games. Swimmers in this class have a similar stroke length and stroke rate to able bodied swimmers.

The nature of a person's amputations in this class can effect their physiology and sports performance. Because of the potential for balance issues related to having an amputation, during weight training, amputees are encouraged to use a spotter when lifting more than 15 pounds (6.8 kg). Lower limb amputations effect a person's energy cost for being mobile. To keep their oxygen consumption rate similar to people without lower limb amputations, they need to walk slower. Because they are missing a limb, amputees are more prone to overuse injuries in their remaining limbs. Common problems with intact upper limbs for people in this class include rotator cuffs tearing, shoulder impingement, epicondylitis and peripheral nerve entrapment.

=== Cerebral palsy ===
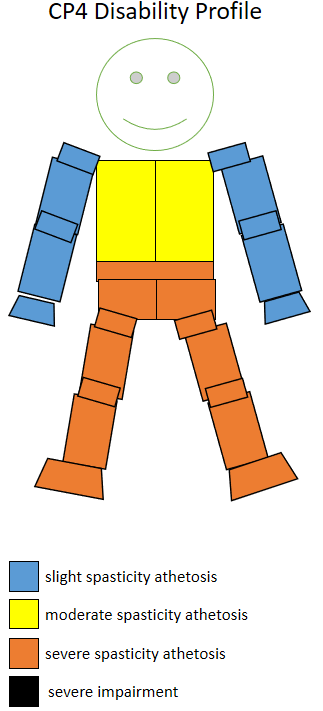
The spasticity athetosis level and location of a CP4 sportsperson.

One of the disability groups in this classification is swimmers with cerebral palsy, including CP3 and CP4 classified swimmers.

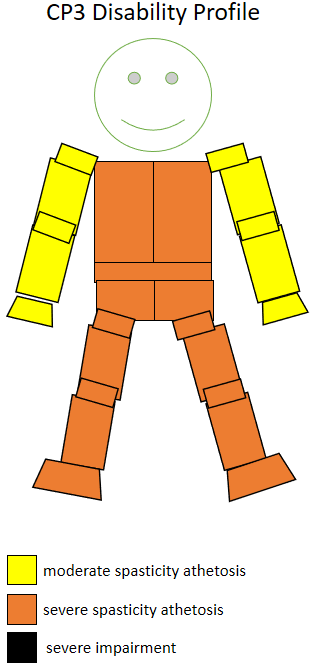
The spasticity athetosis level and location of a CP3 sportsperson.

On a daily basis, CP3 sportspeople are likely to use a wheelchair. Some may be ambulant with the use of assistive devices. While they may have good trunk control, they may have some issues with strong forward movements of their torso. While CP2, CP3 and CP6 have similar issues with Athetoid or Ataxic, CP6 competitors have "flight" while they are ambulant in that it is possible for both feet to not be touching the ground while walking. CP2 and CP3 are unable to do this. Head movement and trunk function differentiate this class from CP4. Lack of symmetry in arm movement are another major difference between the two classes, with CP3 competitors having less symmetry.

On a daily basis, CP4 sportspeople in this class are likely to use a wheelchair. Some may be ambulant with the use of assistive devices. They have minimal control problems in upper limbs and torso, and good upper body strength.

CP3 swimmers tend to have a passive normalized drag in the range of 0.9 to 1.1. This puts them into the passive drag band of PDB3, and PDB5. CP4 swimmers tend to have a passive normalized drag in the range of 0.7 to 0.9. This puts them into the passive drag band of PDB6.

Because of their balance issues, CP3 and CP4 swimmers in this class can find the starting block problematic and often have slower times entering the water than other competitors in their class. Because the disability of swimmers in this class involves in a loss of function in specific parts of their body, they are more prone to injury than their able-bodied counterparts as a result of overcompensation in other parts of their body. When fatigued, asymmetry in their stroke becomes a problem for swimmers in this class.

=== Spinal cord injuries ===
People with spinal cord injuries compete in this class, including F2, F3, F4, F5 sportspeople.

==== F2 ====
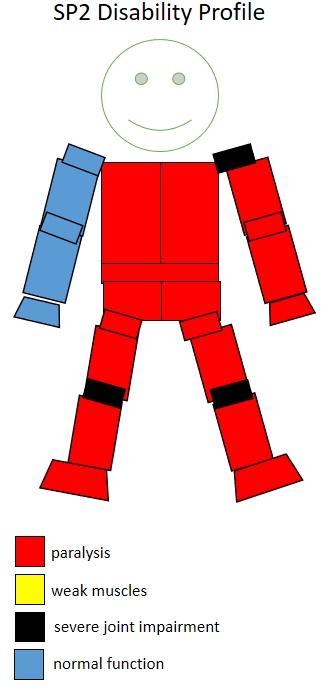
Functional profile of a wheelchair sportsperson in the F2 class.

This is wheelchair sport classification that corresponds to the neurological level C7. In the past, this class was known as 1B Complete, 1A Incomplete. The location of lesions on different vertebrae tend to be associated with disability levels and functionality issues. C7 is associated with elbow flexors. C8 is associated with finger flexors. Disabled Sports USA defined the anatomical definition of this class in 2003 as, ""Have functional elbow flexors and extensors, wrist dorsi-flexors and palmar flexors. Have good shoulder muscle function. May have some finger flexion and extension but not functional." People with lesions at C7 have stabilization and extension of the elbow and some extension of the wrist. People with a lesion at C7 have an impairment that effects the use of their hands and lower arm. They can use a wheelchair using their own power, and do everyday tasks like eating, dressing, and normal physical maintenance. People in this class have a total respiratory capacity of 79% compared to people without a disability.

Swimming classification is done based on a total points system, with a variety of functional and medical tests being used as part of a formula to assign a class. Part of this test involves the Adapted Medical Research Council (MRC) scale. For upper trunk extension, C8 complete are given 0 points.

S4 swimmers tend to be tetraplegics with complete lesions below C8 but have good finger extension, or they are incomplete tetraplegics below C7. These S4 swimmers are able to use their hands and wrists to gain propulsion in the water but have some limits because of lack of full finger control. Because they have no to minimal trunk control, they have leg drag. Their starts are most frequently in the water, and they make turns and start by pushing off the wall using their hands.

For swimming with the most severe disabilities at the 1984 Summer Paralympics, floating devices and a swimming coach in the water swimming next to the Paralympic competitor were allowed. A study of was done comparing the performance of athletics competitors at the 1984 Summer Paralympics. It found there was little significant difference in performance times between women in 1A (SP1, SP2), 1B (SP3), and 1C (SP3, SP4) in the 25m breaststroke. It found there was little significant difference in performance times between women in 1A (SP1, SP2), 1B (SP3), and 1C (SP3, SP4) in the 25m backstroke. It found there was little significant difference in performance times between women in 1A (SP1, SP2), 1B (SP3), and 1C (SP3, SP4) in the 25m freestyle. It found there was little significant difference in performance times between men in 1A (SP1, SP2), 1B (SP3), and 1C (SP3, SP4) in the 25m backstroke. It found there was little significant difference in performance times between men in 1A (SP1, SP2), 1B (SP3), and 1C (SP3, SP4) in the 25m freestyle. It found there was little significant difference in performance times between men in 1A (SP1, SP2), and 1B (SP3) in the 25m breaststroke.

==== F3 ====
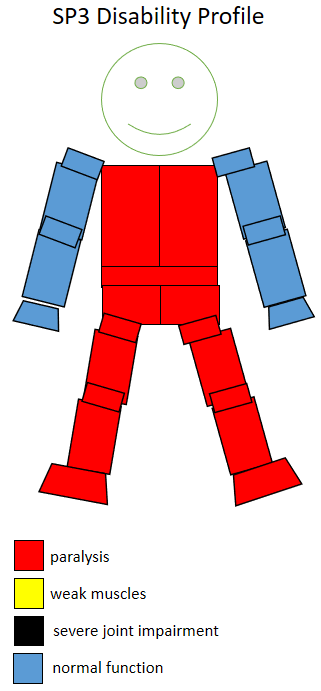
Functional profile of a wheelchair sportsperson in the F3 class.

This is wheelchair sport classification that corresponds to the neurological level C8. In the past, this class was known as 1C Complete, and 1B Incomplete. Disabled Sports USA defined the anatomical definition of this class in 2003 as, "Have full power at elbow and wrist joints. Have full or almost full power of finger flexion and extension. Have functional but not normal intrinsic muscles of the hand (demonstrable wasting)." People with a lesion at C8 have an impairment that effects the use of their hands and lower arm. Disabled Sports USA defined the functional definition of this class in 2003 as, "Have nearly normal grip with non-throwing arm." They have full functional control or close to full functional control over the muscles in their fingers, but may have issues with control in their wrist and hand. People in this class have a total respiratory capacity of 79% compared to people without a disability.

Swimming classification is done based on a total points system, with a variety of functional and medical tests being used as part of a formula to assign a class. Part of this test involves the Adapted Medical Research Council (MRC) scale. For upper trunk extension, C8 complete are given 0 points.

S4 swimmers tend to be tetraplegics with complete lesions below C8 but have good finger extension, or they are incomplete tetraplegics below C7. These S4 swimmers are able to use their hands and wrists to gain propulsion in the water but have some limits because of lack of full finger control. Because they have no to minimal trunk control, they have leg drag. Their starts are most frequently in the water, and they make turns and start by pushing off the wall using their hands.

For swimming with the most severe disabilities at the 1984 Summer Paralympics, floating devices and a swimming coach in the water swimming next to the Paralympic competitor were allowed. A study of was done comparing the performance of athletics competitors at the 1984 Summer Paralympics. It found there was little significant difference in performance times between women in 1A (SP1, SP2), 1B (SP3), and 1C (SP3, SP4) in the 25m breaststroke. It found there was little significant difference in performance times between women in 1A, 1B, and 1C in the 25m backstroke. It found there was little significant difference in performance times between women in 1A, 1B, and 1C in the 25m freestyle. It found there was little significant difference in performance times between men in 1A, 1B, and 1C in the 25m backstroke. It found there was little significant difference in performance times between men in 1A, 1B, and 1C in the 25m freestyle. It found there was little significant difference in performance times between men in 1A, and 1B in the 25m breaststroke.

==== F4 ====
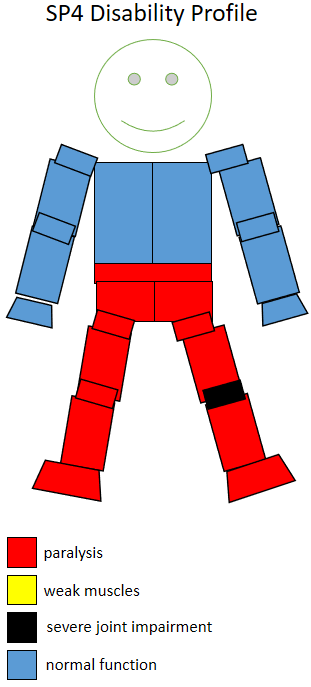
Functional profile of a wheelchair sportsperson in the F4 class.

This is wheelchair sport classification that corresponds to the neurological level T1- T7. In the past, this class was known as 1C Incomplete, 2 Complete, or Upper 3 Complete. F4 sportspeople may have good sitting balance and some impairment in their dominant hand. Disabled Sports USA defined the functional definition of this class in 2003 as, "Have no sitting balance. [...] Usually hold onto part of the chair while throwing. Complete Class 2 and upper Class 3 Athletes have normal upper limbs. They can hold the throwing implement normally. They have no functional trunk movements.Incomplete 1C Athletes who have trunk movements, with hand function like F3." People in this class have a total respiratory capacity of 85% compared to people without a disability.

Swimming classification is done based on a total points system, with a variety of functional and medical tests being used as part of a formula to assign a class. Part of this test involves the Adapted Medical Research Council (MRC) scale. For upper trunk extension, T1 - T5 complete are given 1 - 2 points while T6 - T10 are given 3 - 5 points.

People in SB4 tend to be complete paraplegics below T6 to T10, complete paraplegics at T9 - L1 with surgical rods put in their spinal column from T4 to T6 which affects their balance, or incomplete tetraplegics below C8 with decent trunk function.

A study of was done comparing the performance of athletics competitors at the 1984 Summer Paralympics. It found there was little significant difference in performance times between women in 1A (SP1, SP2), 1B (SP3), and 1C (SP3, SP4) in the 25m breaststroke. It found there was little significant difference in performance times between women in 1A, and 1C in the 25m backstroke. It found there was little significant difference in performance times between women in 1A, 1B, and 1C in the 25m freestyle. It found there was little significant difference in performance times between men in 1A, 1B, and 1C in the 25m backstroke. It found there was little significant difference in performance times between men in 1A, 1B, and 1C in the 25m freestyle. It found there was little significant difference in performance times between women in 2 and 3 in the 50m breaststroke. It found there was little significant difference in performance times between men in 2 (SP4) and 3 (SP4, SP5) in the 50m breaststroke. It found there was little significant difference in performance times between women in 2 (SP4) and 3 (SP4, SP5) in the 50m freestyle. It found there was little significant difference in performance times between men in 2 and 3 in the 50m freestyle. It found there was little significant difference in performance times between men in 2 (SP4) and 3 (SP4, SP5) in the 50m backstroke. It found there was little significant difference in performance times between women in 2, 3 and 4 in the 25 m butterfly. It found there was little significant difference in performance times between men in 2, 3 and 4 in the 25 m butterfly.

==== F5 ====
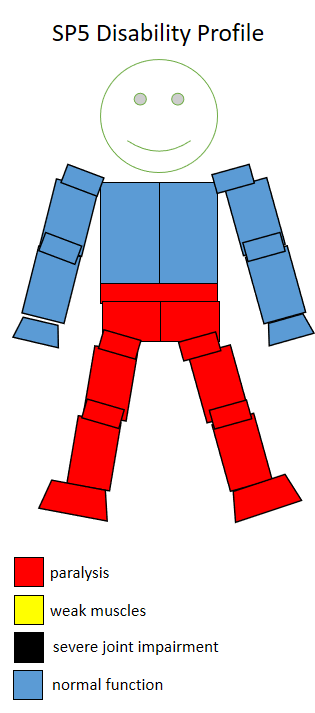
Functional profile of a wheelchair sportsperson in the F5 class.

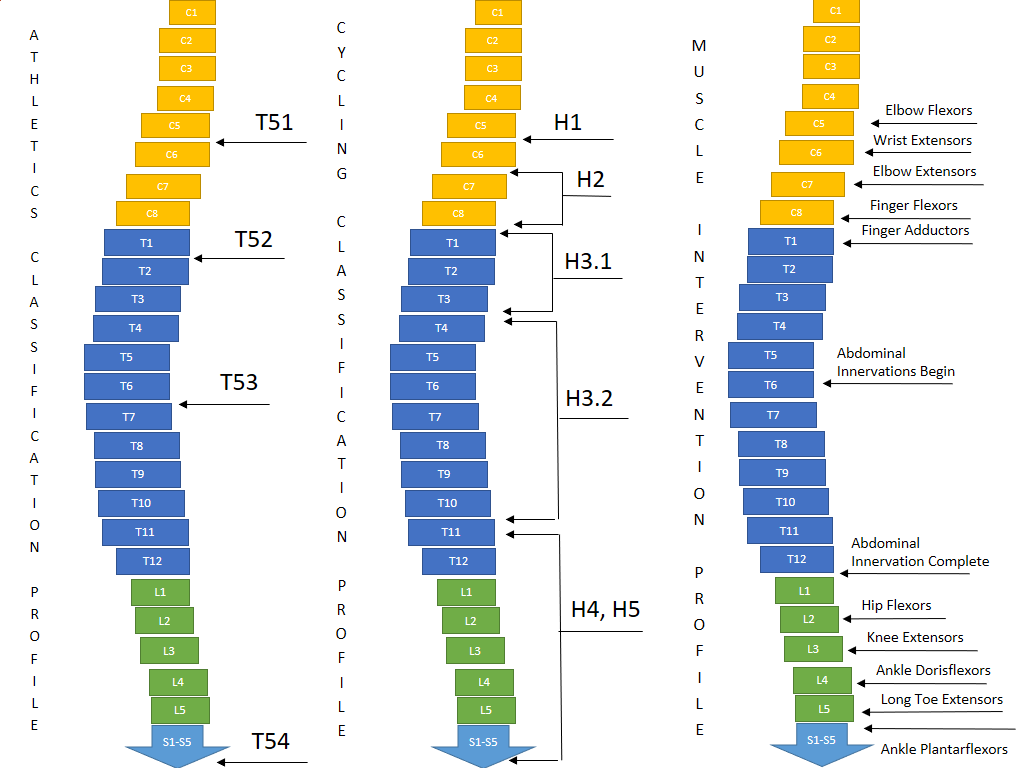
Comparing key muscle innervations for spinal cord levels compared to cycling and athletics classifications.

This is wheelchair sport classification that corresponds to the neurological level T8 - L1. In the past, this class was known as Lower 3, or Upper 4. Disabled Sports USA defined the anatomical definition of this class in 2003 as, "Normal upper limb function. Have abdominal muscles and spinal extensors (upper or more commonly upper and lower). May have non-functional hip flexors (grade 1). Have no abductor function."

People in this class have good sitting balance. People with lesions located between T9 and T12 have some loss of abdominal muscle control. Disabled Sports USA defined the functional definition of this class in 2003 as, "Three trunk movements may be seen in this class: 1) Off the back of a chair (in an upwards direction). 2) Movement in the backwards and forwards plane. 3) Some trunk rotation. They have fair to good sitting balance. They cannot have functional hip flexors, i.e. ability to lift the thigh upwards in the sitting position. They may have stiffness of the spine that improves balance but reduces the ability to rotate the spine."

Swimming classification is done based on a total points system, with a variety of functional and medical tests being used as part of a formula to assign a class. Part of this test involves the Adapted Medical Research Council (MRC) scale. For upper trunk extension, T6 - T10 are given 3 - 5 points.

People in SB4 tend to be complete paraplegics below T6 to T10, complete paraplegics at T9 - L1 with surgical rods put in their spinal column from T4 to T6 which affects their balance, or incomplete tetraplegics below C8 with decent trunk function.

A study of was done comparing the performance of athletics competitors at the 1984 Summer Paralympics. It found there was little significant difference in performance times between women in 2 (SP4) and 3 (SP4, SP5) in the 50m breaststroke. It found there was little significant difference in performance times between men in 2 (SP4) and 3 (SP4, SP5) in the 50m breaststroke. It found there was little significant difference in performance times between women in 2 (SP4) and 3 (SP4, SP5) in the 50m freestyle. It found there was little significant difference in performance times between men in 2 (SP4) and 3 (SP4, SP5) in the 50m freestyle. It found there was little significant difference in performance times between men in 2 (SP4) and 3 (SP4, SP5) in the 50m backstroke. It found there was little significant difference in performance times between women in 4 (SP5, SP6), 5 (SP6, SP7) and 6 (SP7) in the 100m breaststroke. It found there was little significant difference in performance times between women in 4 (SP5, SP6), 5 (SP6, SP7) and 6 (SP7) in the 100m backstroke. It found there was little significant difference in performance times between women in 4 (SP5, SP6), 5 (SP6, SP7) and 6 (SP7) in the 100m freestyle. It found there was little significant difference in performance times between women in 4 (SP5, SP6), 5 (SP6, SP7) and 6 (SP7) in the 14 x 50 m individual medley. It found there was little significant difference in performance times between men in 4 (SP5, SP6), 5 (SP6, SP7) and 6 (SP7) in the 100m backstroke. It found there was little significant difference in performance times between men in 4 (SP5, SP6), 5 (SP6, SP7) and 6 (SP7) in the 100m breaststroke. It found there was little significant difference in performance times between women in 2 (SP4), 3 (SP4, SP5) and 4 (SP5, SP6) in the 25 m butterfly. It found there was little significant difference in performance times between men in 2 (SP4), 3 (SP4, SP5) and 4 (SP5, SP6) in the 25 m butterfly.

== History ==
The classification was created by the International Paralympic Committee. In 2003 the committee approved a plan which recommended the development of a universal classification code. The code was approved in 2007, and defines the "objective of classification as developing and implementing accurate, reliable and consistent sport focused classification systems", which are known as "evidence based, sport specific classification". In November 2015, they approved the revised classification code, which "aims to further develop evidence based, sport specific classification in all sports".

== Events ==
There are a number of events that people from this class can compete in. They include the 50m and 100m Freestyle, 200m Freestyle, 50m Backstroke, 50m Butterfly, 50m Breaststroke, and 150m Individual Medley events.

== At the Paralympic Games ==
For this classification, organisers of the Paralympic Games have the option of including the following events on the Paralympic programme: 50m and 100m Freestyle, 200m Freestyle, 50m Backstroke, 50m Butterfly, 50m Breaststroke, and 150m Individual Medley events.

For the 2016 Summer Paralympics in Rio, the International Paralympic Committee had a zero classification at the Games policy. This policy was put into place in 2014, with the goal of avoiding last minute changes in classes that would negatively impact athlete training preparations. All competitors needed to be internationally classified with their classification status confirmed prior to the Games, with exceptions to this policy being dealt with on a case-by-case basis.

== Records ==
In the S4 50 m Freestyle Long Course, the men's world record is held by Canada’s Sebastian Massabie with a time of 00:35.61 and the women's world record is held by Germany's Tanja Scholz with a time of 00:36.92

In the S4 100 m Freestyle Long Course, the men's world record is held by Israel's Ami Omer Dadaon with a time of 1:19.77 and the women's world record is held by Germany's Tanja Scholz with a time of 1:19.28.

== Getting classified ==
Swimming classification generally has three components. The first is a bench test which tests strength levels. The second is water test to assess how the swimmer performs each stroke. The third is in competition observation. As part of the water test, swimmers are often required to demonstrate their swimming technique for all four strokes. They usually swim a distance of 25 meters for each stroke. They are also generally required to demonstrate how they enter the water and how they turn in the pool.

In Australia, to be classified in this category, athletes contact the Australian Paralympic Committee or their state swimming governing body. In the United States, classification is handled by the United States Paralympic Committee on a national level. The classification test has three components: "a bench test, a water test, observation during competition." American swimmers are assessed by four people: a medical classified, two general classified and a technical classifier.

== Competitors ==
Swimmers who have competed in this classification include Cheryl Angelelli, Aimee Bruder and Nely Miranda who all won medals in their class at the 2008 Paralympics. American swimmers who have been classified by the United States Paralympic Committee as being in this class include Fred Amaya, Cheryl Angelelli, Joe McCarthy and Joel Parks.
