= Swimming at the 2020 Summer Paralympics – Men's 50 metre freestyle S5 =

Men's 50 metre freestyle S5 at the XVI Paralympic Games
- Venue: Tokyo Aquatics Centre
- Dates: 1 September 2021
- Competitors: 16 from 12 nations

Medalists
1st place, gold medalist(s)		Zheng Tao	China
2nd place, silver medalist(s)		Yuan Weiyi	China
3rd place, bronze medalist(s)		Wang Lichao	China

The men's 50 metre freestyle S5 event at the 2020 Paralympic Games took place on 1 September 2021, at the Tokyo Aquatics Centre.

== Heats ==
The swimmers with the top eight times, regardless of heat, advanced to the final.

Rank	Heat	Lane	Name	Nationality	Time	Notes
1	2	4	Yuan Weiyi	China	31.30	Q, PR, AS
2	1	4	Zheng Tao	China	31.81	Q
3	2	5	Daniel Dias	Brazil	32.65	Q
4	1	5	Wang Lichao	China	33.02	Q
5	1	3	Muhammad Nur Syaiful Zulkafli	Malaysia	33.46	Q
6	2	3	Francesco Bocciardo	Italy	33.71	Q
7	2	6	Yaroslav Semenenko	Ukraine	33.74	Q
8	2	7	Sebastián Rodríguez Veloso	Spain	35.27	Q
9	1	7	Siyazbek Daliyev	Kazakhstan	35.49	
10	1	2	Antoni Ponce Bertran	Spain	35.61	
11	1	6	Artur Kubasov	RPC	35.87	
12	2	2	Võ Thanh Tùng	Vietnam	35.91	
13	1	1	Andrew Mullen	Great Britain	36.01	
14	2	8	Luis Huerta Poza	Spain	36.79	
15	1	8	Koral Berkin Kutlu	Turkey	36.85	
16	2	1	Kaede Hinata	Japan	37.45	

== Final ==
50m freestyle final
Rank	Lane	Name	Nationality	Time	Notes
1st place, gold medalist(s)	5	Zheng Tao	China	30.31	PR, AS
2nd place, silver medalist(s)	4	Yuan Weiyi	China	31.11	
3rd place, bronze medalist(s)	6	Wang Lichao	China	31.35	
4	3	Daniel Dias	Brazil	32.12	
5	2	Muhammad Nur Syaiful Zulkafli	Malaysia	32.82	
6	1	Yaroslav Semenenko	Ukraine	33.11	
7	7	Francesco Bocciardo	Italy	33.22	
8	8	Sebastián Rodríguez Veloso	Spain	35.51	
