= Swimming at the 2020 Summer Paralympics – Men's 100 metre freestyle S5 =

Men's 100 metre freestyle S5 at the XVI Paralympic Games
- Venue: Tokyo Aquatics Centre
- Dates: 26 August 2021
- Competitors: 13 from 9 nations

Medalists
1st place, gold medalist(s)		Francesco Bocciardo	Italy
2nd place, silver medalist(s)		Wang Lichao	China
3rd place, bronze medalist(s)		Daniel de Faria Dias	Brazil

The Men's 100 metre freestyle S5 event at the 2020 Paralympic Games took place on 26 August 2021, at the Tokyo Aquatics Centre.

== Heats ==
The swimmers with the top 8 times, regardless of heat, advanced to the final.

Rank	Heat	Lane	Name	Nationality	Time	Notes
1	2	7	Yuan Weiyi	China	1:12.66	Q
2	1	4	Daniel de Faria Dias	Brazil	1:13.02	Q
3	1	5	Antoni Ponce Bertran	Spain	1:13.33	Q
4	2	6	Zheng Tao	China	1:13.83	Q
5	2	4	Francesco Bocciardo	Italy	1:13.96	Q
6	2	5	Wang Lichao	China	1:15.88	Q
7	1	3	Muhammad Nur Syaiful Zulkafli	Malaysia	1:16.33	Q
8	2	2	Luis Huerta Poza	Spain	1:17.75	Q
9	1	2	Sebastián Rodríguez Veloso	Spain	1:19.45	
10	1	7	Koral Berkin Kutlu	Turkey	1:20.20	
11	1	6	Võ Thanh Tùng	Vietnam	1:20.51	
12	2	1	Phuchit Angchaiyaphum	Thailand	1:20.97	
13	2	3	Artur Kubasov	RPC	1:21.26	

== Final ==
100m freestyle final
Rank	Lane	Name	Nationality	Time	Notes
1st place, gold medalist(s)	2	Francesco Bocciardo	Italy	1:09.56	
2nd place, silver medalist(s)	7	Wang Lichao	China	1:10.45	
3rd place, bronze medalist(s)	5	Daniel de Faria Dias	Brazil	1:10.80	
4	6	Zheng Tao	China	1:10.87	
5	4	Yuan Weiyi	China	1:11.68	
6	3	Antoni Ponce Bertran	Spain	1:13.47	
7	1	Muhammad Nur Syaiful Zulkafli	Malaysia	1:15.12	
8	8	Luis Huerta Poza	Spain	1:17.97	
