= Swimming at the 2024 Summer Paralympics – Men's 200 metre freestyle S5 =

Men's 200 metre freestyle S5 at the XVII Paralympic Games
- Venue: La Défense Arena
- Date: 29 August 2024
- Competitors: 12 from 9 nations
- Winning time: 2:25.99

Medalists
| 1st place, gold medalist(s) | | Francesco Bocciardo | Italy |
| 2nd place, silver medalist(s) | | Kirill Pulver | Neutral Paralympic Athletes |
| 3rd place, bronze medalist(s) | | Oleksandr Komarov | Ukraine |

The men's 200 metre freestyle swimming (S5) event at the 2024 Summer Paralympics took place on 29 August 2024, at the La Défense Arena in Paris.

== Records ==
Prior to the competition, the existing world and Paralympic records were as follows.

| World Record | Francesco Bocciardo (ITA) | 2:23.65 | Dublin, Ireland | 13 August 2018 |
| Paralympic Record | Francesco Bocciardo (ITA) | 2:26.76 | Tokyo, Japan | 25 August 2021 |

== Results ==
=== Heats ===
The heats were started at 11:19.

| Rank | Heat | Lane | Name | Nationality | Time | Notes |
|---|---|---|---|---|---|---|
| 1 | 2 | 4 | Francesco Bocciardo | Italy | 2:33.12 | Q |
| 2 | 1 | 4 | Kirill Pulver | Neutral Paralympic Athletes | 2:34.31 | Q |
| 3 | 2 | 5 | Antoni Ponce | Spain | 2:36.76 | Q |
| 4 | 1 | 5 | Oleksandr Komarov | Ukraine | 2:38.86 | Q |
| 5 | 2 | 3 | Guo Jincheng | China | 2:44.72 | Q |
| 6 | 1 | 3 | Wang Lichao | China | 2:46.20 | Q |
| 7 | 2 | 6 | Luis Huerta | Spain | 2:46.54 | Q |
| 8 | 1 | 2 | Zeyad Kahil | Egypt | 2:52.12 | Q, AF |
| 9 | 1 | 6 | Muhammad Nur Syaiful Zulkafli | Malaysia | 2:52.67 | |
| 10 | 2 | 2 | Phuchit Aingchaiyaphum | Thailand | 2:56.57 | |
| 11 | 1 | 7 | Kevin Moreno | Colombia | 2:59.71 | |
| 12 | 2 | 7 | Miguel Ángel Rincón | Colombia | 3:00.67 | |

=== Final ===
The final was held at 20:38.

| Rank | Lane | Name | Nationality | Time | Notes |
|---|---|---|---|---|---|
| 1st place, gold medalist(s) | 4 | Francesco Bocciardo | Italy | 2:25.99 | PR |
| 2nd place, silver medalist(s) | 5 | Kirill Pulver | Neutral Paralympic Athletes | 2:27.32 | |
| 3rd place, bronze medalist(s) | 6 | Oleksandr Komarov | Ukraine | 2:30.13 | |
| 4 | 3 | Antoni Ponce | Spain | 2:34.25 | |
| 5 | 2 | Guo Jincheng | China | 2:40.74 | AS |
| 6 | 1 | Luis Huerta | Spain | 2:45.30 | |
| 7 | 7 | Wang Lichao | China | 2:45.66 | |
| 8 | 8 | Zeyad Kahil | Egypt | 2:52.64 | |
