= Swimming at the 2020 Summer Paralympics – Men's 200 metre freestyle S5 =

Men's 200 metre freestyle S5 at the XVI Paralympic Games
- Venue: Tokyo Aquatics Centre
- Dates: 25 August 2021
- Competitors: 13 from 10 nations
- Winning time: 2:26.76

Medalists
1st place, gold medalist(s)		Francesco Bocciardo	Italy
2nd place, silver medalist(s)		Antoni Ponce Bertran	Spain
3rd place, bronze medalist(s)		Daniel Dias	Brazil

The Men's 200 metre freestyle S5 event at the 2020 Paralympic Games took place on 25 August 2021, at the Tokyo Aquatics Centre.

== Heats ==
The swimmers with the top 8 times, regardless of heat, advanced to the final.

Rank	Heat	Lane	Name	Nationality	Time	Notes
1	1	4	Antoni Ponce Bertran	Spain	2:33.73	Q
2	2	4	Francesco Bocciardo	Italy	2:35.44	Q
3	1	5	Daniel Dias	Brazil	2:45.16	Q
4	2	3	Luis Huerta Poza	Spain	2:45.79	Q
5	2	6	Koral Berkin Kutlu	Turkey	2:46.37	Q
6	1	3	Dmitrii Cherniaev	RPC	2:48.18	Q
7	2	5	Artur Kubasov	RPC	2:49.92	Q
8	1	6	Sebastián Rodríguez Veloso	Spain	2:53.65	Q
9	2	2	Phuchit Aingchaiyaphum	Thailand	2:59.32	
10	2	1	Miguel Ángel Rincón	Colombia	3:03.24	
11	1	7	Zeyad Kahil	Egypt	3:04.85	
12	2	7	Võ Thanh Tùng	Vietnam	3:14.11	
	1	2	Muhammad Nur Syaiful Zulkafli	Malaysia	DSQ	

== Final ==
200m freestyle final
Rank	Lane	Name	Nationality	Time	Notes
1st place, gold medalist(s)	5	Francesco Bocciardo	Italy	2:26.76	PR
2nd place, silver medalist(s)	4	Antoni Ponce Bertran	Spain	2:35.20	
3rd place, bronze medalist(s)	3	Daniel Dias	Brazil	2:38.61	
4	6	Luis Huerta Poza	Spain	2:44.71	
5	2	Koral Berkin Kutlu	Turkey	2:46.62	
6	1	Artur Kubasov	RPC	2:49.67	
7	7	Dmitrii Cherniaev	RPC	2:51.91	
8	8	Sebastián Rodríguez Veloso	Spain	2:52.12	

== See also ==
- Swimming at the 2016 Summer Paralympics – Men's 200 metre freestyle S5
