= Francesco Bocciardo =

Italian Paralympic swimmer (born 1994)

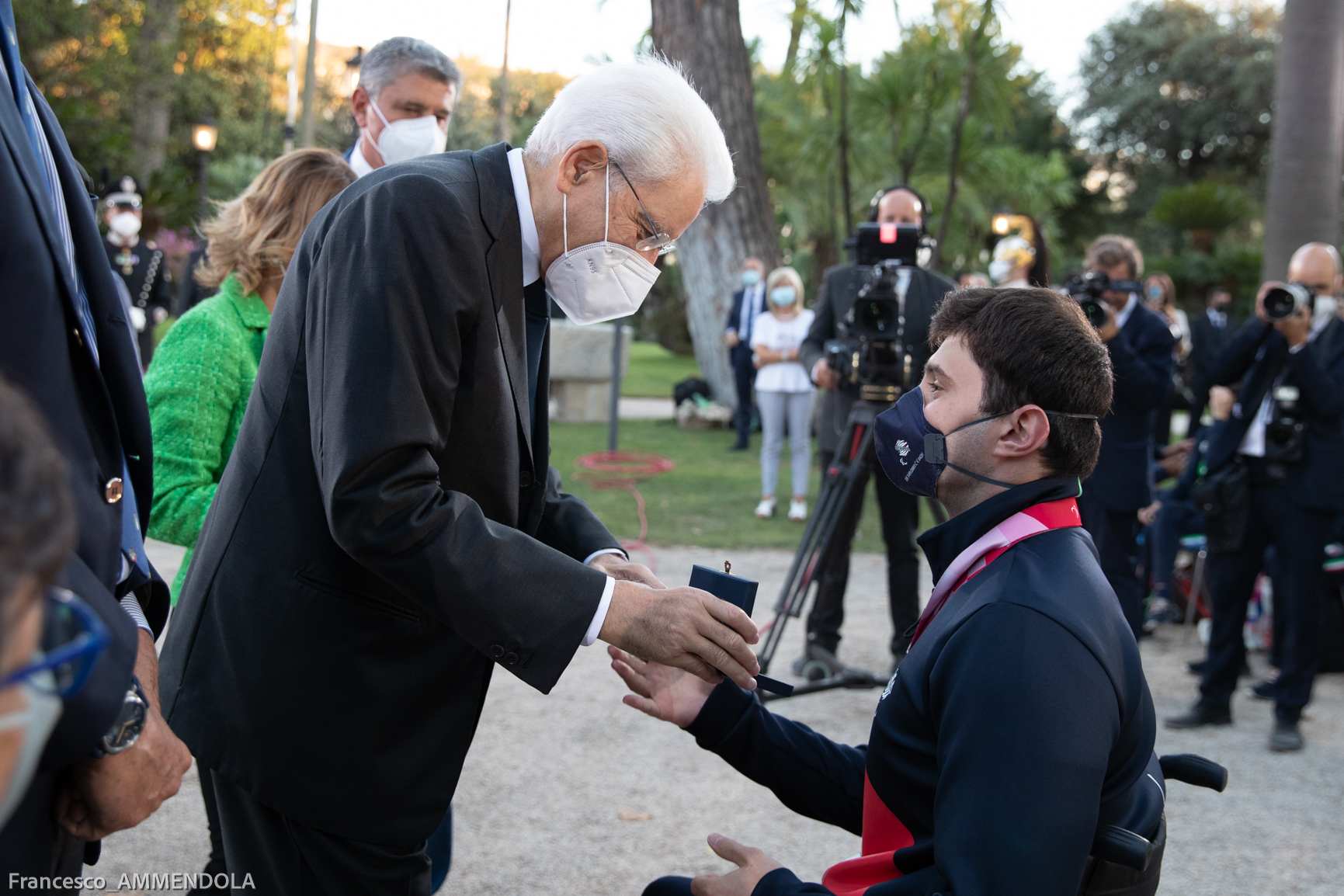
- Bocciardo awarded by the Italian President Sergio Mattarella at Quirinale Palace in 2021.

Personal information
- Born: 18 March 1994 (age 32) Genoa, Italy
- Height: 1.72 m (5 ft 8 in)
- Weight: 70 kg (154 lb)

Sport
- Country: Italy
- Sport: Paralympic swimming
- Disability: Spastic distal tetraplegia
- Disability class: S5
Medal record
Paralympic swimming
Representing Italy
Event	1st	2nd	3rd
Paralympic Games	4	1	0
World Championships	7	6	1
European Championships	3	2	1
Total	14	9	2
Paralympic Games
Gold medal – first place	2016 Rio de Janeiro	400m freestyle S6
Gold medal – first place	2020 Tokyo	100m freestyle S5
Gold medal – first place	2020 Tokyo	200m freestyle S5
Gold medal – first place	2024 Paris	200 m freestyle S5
Silver medal – second place	2020 Tokyo	Mixed 4x50m freestyle
World Championships
Gold medal – first place	2015 Glasgow	400m freestyle S6
Gold medal – first place	2019 London	100m freestyle S5
Gold medal – first place	2019 London	200m freestyle S5
Gold medal – first place	2022 Madeira	50m freestyle S5
Gold medal – first place	2022 Madeira	100m freestyle S5
Gold medal – first place	2022 Madeira	200m freestyle S5
Gold medal – first place	2023 Manchester	200m freestyle S5
Silver medal – second place	2017 Mexico City	400m freestyle S6
Silver medal – second place	2017 Mexico City	4x100m freestyle relay 34pts
Silver medal – second place	2019 London	50m freestyle S5
Silver medal – second place	2019 London	4x50m freestyle relay 20pts
Silver medal – second place	2023 Manchester	100m freestyle S5
Silver medal – second place	2025 Singapore	200m freestyle S5
Bronze medal – third place	2019 London	100m breaststroke SB4
European Championships
Gold medal – first place	2016 Funchal	400m freestyle S6
Gold medal – first place	2018 Dublin	100m breaststroke SB4
Gold medal – first place	2018 Dublin	4x50m freestyle relay 20pts
Silver medal – second place	2018 Dublin	50m freestyle S5
Silver medal – second place	2018 Dublin	100m freestyle S5
Bronze medal – third place	2016 Funchal	4x100m medley relay 34pts

Francesco Bocciardo (born 18 March 1994) is an Italian Paralympic swimmer who competes in international level events. He is a triple World and European champion, he has participated at the 2012 Summer Paralympics and the 2016 Summer Paralympics where he was the Paralympic champion in the men's 400m freestyle S6.

== Biography ==
Bocciardo has a disability called spastic distal tetraplegia which affects the movement in his legs, he was encouraged to do swimming as a part of rehabilitative therapy at a young age then he started swimming competitively in 2010 at the Italian national championships.

== Swimming career ==
Bocciardo has won three world titles and three European titles in freestyle swimming and his most successful championships was at the 2019 World Para Swimming Championships where he won two golds, two silvers and one bronze.

== See also ==
- Italy at the 2020 Summer Paralympics
