= Spain at the 2020 Summer Paralympics =

- Flag of Spain
- IPC code: ESP
- NPC: Spanish Paralympic Committee

in Tokyo, Japan August 24, 2021 – September 5, 2021
- Competitors: 139 in 13 sports
- Flag bearers: Michelle Alonso & Ricardo Ten
- Medals Ranked 15th: Gold 9 Silver 15 Bronze 12 Total 36

Summer Paralympics appearances (overview)
- 1968; 1972; 1976; 1980; 1984; 1988; 1992; 1996; 2000; 2004; 2008; 2012; 2016; 2020; 2024

Spain competed at the 2020 Summer Paralympics in Tokyo, Japan from 24 August to 5 September 2021. This was Spain's fourteenth appearance at the Paralympic Games. During the Games, Spanish athletes settled 4 World records and 1 Paralympic record.

== Medalists ==
Medal	Name	Sport	Event	Date
Gold	Alfonso Cabello	Cycling	Men's time trial C4–5	26 August
Gold	Susana Rodríguez Gacio; Guide: Sara Loehr	Paratriathlon	Women's PTVI	28 August
Gold	Yassine Ouhdadi El Ataby	Athletics	Men's 5000 metres T13	28 August
Gold	Kim López Gónzalez	Athletics	Men's shot put F12	28 August
Gold	Michelle Alonso Morales	Swimming	Women's 100m breaststroke SB14	29 August
Gold	Gerard Descarrega Puigdevall; Guide: Guillermo Rojo Gil	Athletics	Men's 400m T11	29 August
Gold	Sergio Garrote Muñoz	Cycling	Men's time trial H2	31 August
Gold	Marta Fernández Infante	Swimming	Women's 50 metre breaststroke SB3	31 August
Gold	Adiaratou Iglesias Forneiro	Athletics	Women's 100m T13	31 August
Silver	Miguel Luque	Swimming	Men's 50 metre breaststroke SB3	25 August
Silver	Antoni Ponce Bertran	Swimming	Men's 200 metre freestyle S5	25 August
Silver	Oscar Salguero Galisteo	Swimming	Men's 100 metre breaststroke SB8	26 August
Silver	Iñigo Llopis Sanz	Swimming	Men's 100 metre breaststroke S8	27 August
Silver	Marta Fernandez Infante	Swimming	Women's 50 metre butterfly S5	27 August
Silver	Sergio Ibáñez	Judo	Men's 66 kg	27 August
Silver	Héctor Catalá Laparra; Guide: Gustavo Rodríguez	Paratriathlon	Men's PTVI	28 August
Silver	Antoni Ponce Bertran	Swimming	Men's 100m breaststroke SB5	28 August
Silver	Sara Martínez	Athletics	Women's long jump T11	29 August
Silver	Nuria Marqués Soto	Swimming	Women's 100m backstroke S9	30 August
Silver	Teresa Perales	Swimming	Women's 50m backstroke S5	30 August
Silver	Sarai Gascón Moreno	Swimming	Women's 100 metre freestyle#S9	31 August
Silver	Miriam Martínez Rico	Athletics	Women's shot put F36	1 September
Silver	Adiaratou Iglesias Forneiro	Athletics	Women's 400 metres T13	4 September
Silver	Iván José Cano Blanco	Athletics	Men's long jump T13	4 September
Bronze	Alejandro Sánchez Palomero	Paratriathlon	Men's PTS4	28 August
Bronze	Ricardo Ten Argiles; Pablo Jaramillo Gallardo; Alfonso Cabello Llamas	Cycling	Mixed team sprint C1–5	28 August
Bronze	Eva María Moral Pedrero	Paratriathlon	Women's PTWC	29 August
Bronze	Luis Miguel García-Marquina	Cycling	Men's time trial H3	31 August
Bronze	Christian Venge Balboa Guide: Noel Martín	Cycling	Men's time trial B	31 August
Bronze	Sergio Garrote Muñoz	Cycling	Men's road race H1-2	1 September
Bronze	Nuria Marqués Soto	Swimming	Women's 200m individual medley SM9	1 September
Bronze	Jordi Morales; Álvaro Valera	Table tennis	Men's team class 6–7	1 September
Bronze	Sarai Gascón Moreno	Swimming	Women's 100 metre butterfly S9	2 September
Bronze	Marta Fernandez Infante	Swimming	Women's 50 metre freestyle S4	2 September
Bronze	Héctor Cabrera Llácer	Athletics	Men's javelin throw F13	2 September
Bronze	Juan Antonio Saavedra Reinaldo	Shooting	Mixed R6 50 metre rifle prone SH1	5 September

=== Medals by sport ===
Medals by sport
Sport	Gold medal	Silver medal	Bronze medal	Total
Athletics	4	4	1	9
Swimming	2	9	3	14
Cycling	2	0	4	6
Paratriathlon	1	1	2	4
Judo	0	1	0	1
Shooting	0	0	1	1
Table tennis	0	0	1	1
Total	9	15	12	36

=== Medals by date ===
Medals by date
Day	Date	Gold medal	Silver medal	Bronze medal	Total
1	25 Aug	0	2	0	2
2	26 Aug	1	1	0	2
3	27 Aug	0	3	0	3
4	28 Aug	3	2	2	7
5	29 Aug	2	1	1	4
6	30 Aug	0	2	0	2
7	31 Aug	3	1	2	6
8	1 Sept	0	1	3	4
9	2 Sept	0	0	3	3
10	3 Sept	0	0	0	0
11	4 Sept	0	2	0	2
12	5 Sept	0	0	1	1
Total		9	15	12	36

=== Medals by gender ===
Medals by gender^{(Comparison graphs)}
Gender	Gold medal	Silver medal	Bronze medal	Total	Percentage
Female	4	7	4	15	41.6%
Male	5	8	8	21	58.4%
Mixed	0	0	0	0	0.0%
Total	9	15	12	36	100%

== Archery ==
Athlete	Event	Ranking round		Round of 32	Round of 16	Quarterfinals	Semifinals	Final / BM	
Athlete	Event	Score	Seed	Opposition Score	Opposition Score	Opposition Score	Opposition Score	Opposition Score	Rank
María Carmen Rubio	Women's compound open	652	21	Asgari (IRI); L 134-140	Did not advance				17

== Athletics ==
Gerard Descarrega Puigdevall, Alberto Suarez Laso, Gustavo Nieves, Kim Lopez Gonzalez and Sara Martínez Puntero are among the athletes to represent Spain at the 2020 Summer Paralympics.

Men's track

Athlete	Event	Heats		Final	
Athlete	Event	Result	Rank	Result	Rank
Gerard Descarrega Puigdevall; Guide: Guillermo Rojo	100m T11	11.30	6 q	Did not advance from semifinals	
Gerard Descarrega Puigdevall; Guide: Guillermo Rojo	400m T11	50.61	1 Q	50.42	1st place, gold medalist(s)
Deliber Rodríguez Ramírez	400m T20	48.57	1 Q	48.05	4
Eduardo Uceda Novas; Guide: Jorge Gutiérrez Hellín	400m T11	52.01	4	Did not advance	
Yassine Ouhdadi El Ataby	1500m T13	—N/a		3:56.73	6
Yassine Ouhdadi El Ataby	5000m T13	—N/a		14:34.13	1st place, gold medalist(s)
Gustavo Nieves	Marathon T12	—N/a		2:32:08	8
Alberto Suarez Laso	Marathon T12	—N/a		2:30:44	5

Men's field

Athlete	Event	Final		
Athlete	Event	Result	Points	Rank
Álvaro del Amo Cano	Shot put F11	12.16	—N/a	9
Héctor Cabrera	Shot put F12	13.03	—N/a	7
Héctor Cabrera	Javelin throw F13	61.13	—N/a	3rd place, bronze medalist(s)
Iván José Cano Blanco	Long jump T13	7.04	—N/a	2nd place, silver medalist(s)
Kim López Gónzalez	Shot put F12	17.04	—N/a	(gold) WR
Xavier Porras	Long jump T11	5.93	—N/a	5

Women's track

Athlete	Event	Heats		Final	
Athlete	Event	Result	Rank	Result	Rank
Nagore Folgado García; Guide: Joan Raga	100m T12	12.77	8 q	Did not advance from semifinals	
Nagore Folgado García; Guide: Joan Raga	200m T12	DSQ		Did not advance	
Alba García Falagán; Guide: Jonatan Orozco	100m T12	12.85	9	Did not advance	
Alba García Falagán; Guide: Jonatan Orozco	200m T12	26.45	7	Did not advance	
Adiaratou Iglesias Forneiro	100m T13	12.20	4 Q	11.96	1st place, gold medalist(s)
Adiaratou Iglesias Forneiro	400m T13	55.70	2 Q AR	55.53	2nd place, silver medalist(s)
Sara Martinez; Guide: Enric Martín	400m T12	DSQ		Did not advance	
Izaskun Osés Ayúcar	400m T12	1:00.50	6	Did not advance	
Izaskun Osés Ayúcar	1500m T13	4:46.70	3 Q	4:39.92	6
María del Carmen Paredes; Guide: Lorenzo Sánchez	1500m T13	5:56.71	7	Did not advance	
María del Carmen Paredes; Guide: Lorenzo Sánchez	Marathon T12	—N/a		3:37:44	9
Susana Rodríguez Gacio; Guide: Celso Comesaña	1500m T11	4:51.38	3 Q	4:52.67	5
Desirée Vila Bargiela	100m T63	16.84	7	Did not advance	
Sara Andrés Barrio	100m T64	13.39	8 q	13.39	7

Women's field

Athlete	Event	Final		
Athlete	Event	Result	Points	Rank
Sara Fernandez	Long jump T12	4.85	—N/a	7
Sara Martinez; Guide: Enric Martín Panedés	Long jump T12	5.38	—N/a	2nd place, silver medalist(s)
Miriam Martínez Rico	Shot put F36	9.62	—N/a	2nd place, silver medalist(s)
Desirée Vila Bargiela	Long jump T63	4.02	—N/a	6
Sara Andrés Barrio	Long jump T64	4.54	—N/a	10

== Cycling ==
Spain sent ten cyclists, all male. Paralympic swimmer Ricardo Ten is debuting in this sport.

Men's road

Athlete	Event	Time	Rank
Adolfo Bellido Guerrero; Pilot: Eloy Teruel Rovira	Road race B	3:09:03	5
Adolfo Bellido Guerrero; Pilot: Eloy Teruel Rovira	Time trial B	43:12.76	4
Alfonso Cabello	Road race C4-5	DNF	
Luis Miguel García-Marquina	Road race H3	DNF	
Luis Miguel García-Marquina	Time trial H3	43:48.68	3rd place, bronze medalist(s)
Sergio Garrote Muñoz	Road race H1-2	1:54:36	3rd place, bronze medalist(s)
Sergio Garrote Muñoz	Time trial H2	31:23.53	1st place, gold medalist(s)
Pablo Jaramillo Gallardo	Road race C4-5	DNF	
Joan Reinoso Figuerola	Road race T1-2	53:05	4
Joan Reinoso Figuerola	Time trial T1-2	31:07.27	4
Israel Rider Ibáñez	Road race H3	DNF	
Israel Rider Ibáñez	Time trial H3	47:52.51	14
Eduardo Santas Asensio	Road race C1-2-3	2:28:22	26
Eduardo Santas Asensio	Time trial C3	36:43.11	5
Ricardo Ten	Road race C1-2-3	2:11:15	10
Ricardo Ten	Time trial C1	DNF	
Christian Venge Balboa; Pilot: Noel Martín Infante	Road race B	3:07:25	4
Christian Venge Balboa; Pilot: Noel Martín Infante	Time trial B	42:52.12	3rd place, bronze medalist(s)

Men's track

Athlete	Event	Qualification		Final	
Athlete	Event	Time	Rank	Opposition Time	Rank
Adolfo Bellido Guerrero; Pilot: Eloy Teruel Rovira	Kilo B	—N/a		1:04.061	6
Adolfo Bellido Guerrero; Pilot: Eloy Teruel Rovira	Pursuit B	4:13.238	6	Did not advance	
Alfonso Cabello	Kilo C4-5	—N/a		1:01.557	(gold) WR
Pablo Jaramillo Gallardo	Kilo C4-5	—N/a		1:07.081	13
Eduardo Santas Asensio	Kilo C1-2-3	—N/a		1:08.992	9
Eduardo Santas Asensio	Individual pursuit C3	3:27.682	4 Q	3:27.833	4
Ricardo Ten	Kilo C1-2-3	—N/a		1:08.968	8
Ricardo Ten	Individual pursuit C1	3:42.795	4 Q	3:43.351	4
Christian Venge Balboa; Pilot: Noel Martín Infante	Pursuit B	4:15.494	7	Did not advance	

Mixed

Athlete	Event	Heats		Final	
Athlete	Event	Result	Rank	Result	Rank
Ricardo Ten Argiles; Pablo Jaramillo Gallardo; Alfonso Cabello Llamas	Mixed team sprint C1–5	49.571	3 Q	49.209	3rd place, bronze medalist(s)
Israel Rider Ibáñez; Sergio Garrote Muñoz; Luis Miguel García-Marquina	Mixed H1–5 team relay	—N/a		54:14	5

== Football 5-a-side ==
Spain qualified to compete in football 5-a-side at the 2020 Summer Paralympics. The following is the Spain squad in the football 5-a-side tournament of the 2020 Summer Paralympics.

No.	Pos.	Player	Class	Date of birth (age)
1	GK	Pedro Gutiérrez	Sighted	25 January 1986 (aged 35)
4	DF	Iván López	B1	10 November 1992 (aged 28)
5	DF	Pablo Cantero López	B1	1 April 1994 (aged 27)
6	DF	Adolfo Acosta	B1	19 May 1981 (aged 40)
7	FW	Sergio Alamar	B1	20 October 2000 (aged 20)
9	FW	Antonio Jesús Martín	B1	20 April 1982 (aged 39)
10	FW	Youssef El Haddaqui	B1	28 December 1988 (aged 32)
11	FW	Miguel Sánchez López	B1	4 April 2000 (aged 21)
12	GK	Sergio Rodríguez	Sighted	11 July 1987 (aged 34)
21	FW	Vicente Aguilar Carmona	B1	10 April 1970 (aged 51)

Team	Event	Group stage				Semifinal	Final / BM	
Team	Event	Opposition Score	Opposition Score	Opposition Score	Rank	Opposition Score	Opposition Score	Rank
Spain men's	Men's tournament	Thailand; W 1-0	Argentina; L 0-2	Morocco; D 1-1	3	Did not advance	Fifth place match Japan; L 0-1	6

== Judo ==
Athlete	Event	Preliminaries	Quarterfinals	Semifinals	Repechage	Final / BM	
Athlete	Event	Opposition Result	Opposition Result	Opposition Result	Opposition Result	Opposition Result	Rank
Sergio Ibáñez	Men's -66 kg	Pérez (PUR); W 1-0	Abasli (AZE); W 1-0	Gamjashvili (GEO); W 1-0	Bye	Kuranbaev (UZB); L 0-1	2nd place, silver medalist(s)
Álvaro Gavilán	Men's -73 kg	Bareikis (LTU); L 0-1	Did not advance				9
Marta Arce Payno	Women's -66 kg	Wang (CHN); L 0-1	—N/a	—N/a	Hiroko (JPN); W 1-0	Sheripboeva (UZB); L 0-1	5

== Paracanoeing ==
Spain qualified five boats in Men's KL1, KL3, VL2 & VL3 and Women's KL2 events.

Athlete	Event	Heats		Semifinal		Final	
Athlete	Event	Time	Rank	Time	Rank	Time	Rank
Adrián Castaño	Men's KL1	57.020	4 Q	54.547	4 (FB)	55.539	11
Juan Valle	Men's KL3	42.337	4 Q	41.469	2 (FA)	42.513	7
Higinio Rivero	Men's VL2	58.366	2 Q	55.195	1 (FA)	56.058	6
Adrián Mosquera	Men's VL3	56.773	7 Q	54.968	5 (FB)	55.845	11
Adrián Mosquera	Men's KL3	49.740	7 Q	46.778	6 (FB)	47.642	14
Inés Felipe	Women's KL2	1:04.862	6 Q	1:01.351	5 (FB)	1:02.372	12

Qualification Legend: FA=Final A (medal); FB=Final B (non-medal)

== Powerlifting ==
Athlete	Event	Attempts			Result	Rank
Athlete	Event	1	2	3	Result	Rank
Loida Zabala	Women's -50 kg	93	~~97~~	~~97~~	93	6
Maria Alcoba	Women's -79 kg	103	107	~~110~~	107	7

== Rowing ==
Spain qualified two boats in the men's single sculls and mixed coxed four events. Javier Reja qualified for the games by winning the gold medal at the 2021 FISA European Qualification Regatta in Varese, Italy. Meanwhile, mixed coxed four crews received the bipartite commission invitation allocation.

Athlete	Event	Heats		Repechage		Final	
Athlete	Event	Time	Rank	Time	Rank	Time	Rank
Javier Reja	Men's single sculls	10:38.83	3 Q	9:33.42	2 FA	10:06.73	4
Josefa Benítez; Enrique Floriano; Jorge Pineda; Verónica Rodríguez	Mixed coxed four	8:08.53	6 Q	7:39.64	5 FB	8:12.51	11

Qualification Legend: FA=Final A (medal); FB=Final B (non-medal); R=Repechage

== Shooting ==
Juan Antonio Saavedra Reinaldo qualified to represent Spain at the 2020 Summer Paralympics.

Athlete	Event	Qualification		Final	
Athlete	Event	Score	Rank	Score	Rank
Juan Antonio Saavedra	Mixed R6 50m rifle prone SH1	620.6	3 Q	226.3	3rd place, bronze medalist(s)
Juan Antonio Saavedra	Mixed R3 10m air rifle prone SH1	634.6	4 Q	210.1	4

== Swimming ==
Twenty six Spanish swimmer has qualified.

Men

Athlete	Event	Heats		Final	
Athlete	Event	Result	Rank	Result	Rank
José Ramón Cantero	400m freestyle S11	4:59.73	7 Q	4:57.25	6
José Ramón Cantero	200m individual medley SM11	2:39.72	9	Did not advance	
Jacobo Garrido	400m freestyle S9	4:20.28	6 Q	4:17.41	5
Jacobo Garrido	100m butterfly S9	1:05.36	15	Did not advance	
Jacobo Garrido	200m individual medley SM9	DSQ			
Luis Huerta	50m freestyle S5	36.79	14	Did not advance	
Luis Huerta	100m freestyle S5	1:17.75	8 Q	1:17.97	8
Luis Huerta	200m freestyle S5	2:45.79	4 Q	2:44.71	4
Luis Huerta	100m breaststroke SB4	1:54.72	9	Did not advance	
David Levecq	50m freestyle S10	25.00	8 Q	25.08	8
David Levecq	100m freestyle S10	55.51	9	Did not advance	
David Levecq	100m butterfly S10	59.10	7 Q	59.12	8
Íñigo Llopis	100m freestyle S8	1:01.95	14	Did not advance	
Íñigo Llopis	400m freestyle S8	4:44.19	7 Q	4:45.69	7
Íñigo Llopis	100m backstroke S8	1:07.90	2 Q	1:06.82	2nd place, silver medalist(s)
Miguel Luque	50m breaststroke SB3	50.06	2 Q	49.08	2nd place, silver medalist(s)
Miguel Luque	50m backstroke S4	49.57	10	Did not advance	
Miguel Luque	150m individual medley SM4	2:46.89	4 Q	2:45.78	4
José Antonio Mari	400m freestyle S9	4:28.70	11	Did not advance	
José Antonio Mari	50m freestyle S9	26.42	10	Did not advance	
José Antonio Mari	100m butterfly S9	1:00.97	3 Q	1:01.28	6
Carlos Martínez Fernández	100m butterfly S8	1:11.86	16	Did not advance	
Carlos Martínez Fernández	100m breaststroke SB8	1:19.30	11	Did not advance	
Carlos Martínez Fernández	200m individual medley SM8	2:31.93	12	Did not advance	
Miguel Ángel Martínez	50m freestyle S3	54.09	8 Q	54.99	8
Miguel Ángel Martínez	50m backstroke S3	54.88	8 Q	54.57	8
Miguel Ángel Martínez	100m freestyle S4	1:53.89	14	Did not advance	
Miguel Ángel Martínez	200m freestyle S3	3:51.62	6 Q	3:53.44	7
Sergio Martos	100m backstroke S8	1:12.15	9	Did not advance	
Sergio Martos	100m butterfly S8	1:08.01	14	Did not advance	
Antoni Ponce	50m freestyle S5	35.61	10	Did not advance	
Antoni Ponce	100m freestyle S5	1:13.33	3 Q	1:13.47	6
Antoni Ponce	200m freestyle S5	2:33.73	1 Q	2:35.20	2nd place, silver medalist(s)
Antoni Ponce	50m backstroke S5	38.57	8 Q	38.42	8
Antoni Ponce	100m breaststroke SB5	1:26.72	1 Q PR	1:26.53	2nd place, silver medalist(s)
Sebastián Rodríguez	50m freestyle S5	35.27	8 Q	35.51	8
Sebastián Rodríguez	100m freestyle S5	1:19.45	9	Did not advance	
Sebastián Rodríguez	200m freestyle S5	2:53.65	8 Q	2:52.12	8
Alejandro Rojas Cabrera	50m butterfly S6	33.87	8 Q	33.60	8
Iván Salguero	400m freestyle S13	4:21.94	7 Q	4:21.56	7
Oscar Salguero	50m freestyle S9	28.11	21	Did not advance	
Oscar Salguero	100m breaststroke SB8	1:10.19	2 Q	1:09.91	2nd place, silver medalist(s)
Oscar Salguero	200m individual medley SM9	2:23.73	5 Q	2:23.92	6
David Sánchez Sierra	100m backstroke S6	1:21.14	8 Q	1:19.92	8
David Sánchez Sierra	50m butterfly S6	32.45	4 Q	32.49	5
David Sánchez Sierra	200m individual medley SM6	2:55.76	11	Did not advance	
Xavier Torres	50m backstroke S4	47.73	8 Q	46.93	7
Xavier Torres	150m individual medley SM4	2:49.27	6 Q	2:47.74	6
Xavier Torres	200m freestyle S4	3:25.84	10	Did not advance	
Jacobo Garrido; Sergio Martos; Íñigo Llopis; José Antonio Mari	Men's 4x100m Freestyle relay - 34pts	—N/a		4:00.71	7
Jacobo Garrido; Sergio Martos (Note: Swam only in heats.); Íñigo Llopis; José Antonio Mari; Oscar Salguero; Carlos Martínez; David Levecq	Men's 4x100m Medley - 34pts	4:29.67	6 Q	4:15.84	4

Women

Athlete	Event	Heats		Final	
Athlete	Event	Result	Rank	Result	Rank
Michelle Alonso Morales	100m breaststroke SB14	1:13.35	1 Q	1:12.02	(gold) WR
Michelle Alonso Morales	200m freestyle S14	2:18.39	8 Q	2:19.67	8
Eva Coronado	200m freestyle S14	2:23.13	11	Did not advance	
María Delgado	50m freestyle S13	28.96	17	Did not advance	
María Delgado	100m freestyle S12	1:02.05	5 Q	1:01.49	5
María Delgado	400m freestyle S13	4:44.49	5 Q	4:46.88	6
María Delgado	100m backstroke S12	—N/a		1:12.83	4
Ariadna Edo Beltrán	100m backstroke S13	1:20.41	11	Did not advance	
Ariadna Edo Beltrán	400m freestyle S13	4:51.55	10	Did not advance	
Ariadna Edo Beltrán	100m butterfly S13	1:14.60	15	Did not advance	
Ariadna Edo Beltrán	100m breaststroke SB13	1:27.89	13	Did not advance	
Ariadna Edo Beltrán	200m individual medley SM13	2:40.78	10	Did not advance	
Marta Fernández Infante	50m freestyle S4	41.39	1 Q	40.85	3rd place, bronze medalist(s)
Marta Fernández Infante	50m butterfly S5	41.27	2 Q	40.22	(silver) WR
Marta Fernández Infante	50m breaststroke SB3	59.46	1 Q	58.21	1st place, gold medalist(s)
Marta Fernández Infante	150m individual medley SM4	3:03.11	4 Q	2:59.13	4
Sarai Gascon	100m freestyle S9	1:03.89	5 Q	1:02.77	2nd place, silver medalist(s)
Sarai Gascon	100m butterfly S9	1:10.63	5 Q	1:08.43	3rd place, bronze medalist(s)
Sarai Gascon	100m breaststroke SB9	1:20.53	6 Q	1:19.93	5
Sarai Gascon	200m individual medley SM9	2:41.78	8 Q	2:37.62	4
Isabel Yingüa Hernández	50m freestyle S10	30.04	13	Did not advance	
Isabel Yingüa Hernández	100m backstroke S10	1:19.25	12	Did not advance	
Isabel Yingüa Hernández	100m butterfly S10	—N/a		1:10.79	6
Nuria Marqués Soto	400m freestyle S9	4:53.53	5 Q	4:52.64	6
Nuria Marqués Soto	100m backstroke S9	1:10.45	2 Q	1:10.26	2nd place, silver medalist(s)
Nuria Marqués Soto	100m breaststroke SB8	1:26.41	4 Q	1:26.53	5
Nuria Marqués Soto	200m individual medley SM9	2:38.79	3 Q	2:35.64	3rd place, bronze medalist(s)
Teresa Perales	100m freestyle S5	1:23.48	5 Q	1:23.31	5
Teresa Perales	50m backstroke S5	44.54	2 Q	43.02	2nd place, silver medalist(s)
Nahia Zudaire	400m freestyle S8	—N/a		5:07.67	4
Nahia Zudaire	100m butterfly S8	—N/a		1:21.01	4
Nahia Zudaire	200m individual medley SM8	3:00.01	3	DSQ	
Nuria Marqués Soto; Sarai Gascon; Isabel Yingüa Hernández; Teresa Perales	Women's 4x100m Medley - 34pts	—N/a		5:04.58	5

Mixed

Athlete	Event	Heats		Final	
Athlete	Event	Result	Rank	Result	Rank
Antoni Ponce; Sebastián Rodríguez; Alejandro Rojas Cabrera; David Sánchez Sierra; Teresa Perales; Marta Fernández Infante	Mixed 4x50 Freestyle relay	2:29.24	2 Q	2:25.66	5
José Ramón Cantero; María Delgado; Ariadna Edo Beltrán; Iván Salguero	Mixed 4x100m Freestyle relay - 49pts	—N/a		4:03.38	4

== Table tennis ==
Spain entered six athletes into the table tennis competition at the games. All of them qualified via World Ranking allocation.

Men

Athlete	Event	Group stage			Round 1	Quarterfinals	Semifinals	Final	
Athlete	Event	Opposition Result	Opposition Result	Rank	Opposition Result	Opposition Result	Opposition Result	Opposition Result	Rank
Iker Sastre	Individual C2	Czuper (POL); L 0-3	Nazirov (RPC); L 2-3	3	Did not advance				
Miguel Ángel Toledo Bachiller	Individual C2	Molliens (FRA); L 2-3	Yezyk (UKR); L 0-3	3	Did not advance				
Francisco Javier López Sayago	Individual C4	Young-Gun (KOR); L 1-3	Mihalik (SVK); W 3-1	2	Gonzalez (CHI); W 3-0	Ozturk (TUR); L 0-3	Did not advance		5
Alvaro Valera	Individual C6	Chatzikyriakos (GRE); W 3-2	Dettoni (CHI); L 0-3	3	Did not advance				
Jordi Morales	Individual C7	Vargas (COL); W 3-0	Schnake (GER); W 3-1	1	Bye	Chudzicki (POL); L 0-3	Did not advance		5
Juan Bautista Perez	Individual C9	Devos (BEL); L 0-3	Leibovitz (USA); L 0-3	3	Did not advance				
Jose Manuel Ruiz Reyes	Individual C10	Jacobs (INA); L 0-3	Bakic (MNE); L 0-3	3	Did not advance				
Eduardo Cuesta Martinez	Individual C11	Creange (FRA); L 1-3	Gharsallah (TUN); W 3-0	2	von Einem (AUS); L 1-3	Did not advance			9

Team

Athlete	Event	Round 1	Quarterfinals	Semifinals	Final	
Athlete	Event	Opposition Result	Opposition Result	Opposition Result	Opposition Result	Rank
Iker Sastre; Miguel Ángel Toledo Bachiller	Men's team C1-2	Bye	South Korea; L 0-2	Did not advance		5
Álvaro Valera; Jordi Morales	Men's team C6-7	Bye	Egypt; W 2-0	Great Britain; L 1-2	Did not advance	3rd place, bronze medalist(s)
Juan Bautista Pérez; Jose Manuel Ruiz Reyes	Men's team C9-10	Great Britain; L 0-2	Did not advance			9

== Taekwondo ==
Spain qualified one athletes to compete at the Paralympics competition. Alejandro Vidal Alvarez qualified by finishing top six in world ranking.

Athlete	Event	First round	Quarterfinals	Semifinals	Repechage	Final/BM	
Athlete	Event	Opposition Result	Opposition Result	Opposition Result	Opposition Result	Opposition Result	Rank
Alejandro Vidal Alvarez	Men's –61 kg	Elzayat (EGY); L 11-17	Bye		Ganbat (MGL); L 11-33	Did not advance	9

== Triathlon ==
Athlete	Event	Swim (750 m)	Trans 1	Bike (20 km)	Trans 2	Run (5 km)	Total Time	Rank
Alejandro Sánchez Palomero	Men's PTS4	11:14	1:19	31:29	0:50	19:32	1:04:24	3rd place, bronze medalist(s)
Jairo Ruiz	Men's PTS5	11:45	0:58	31:44	0:42	17:47	1:02:48	8
Héctor Cátala Laparra; Pilot: Gustavo Rodríguez Iglesias	Men's PTVI	14:59	0:54	28:45	0:42	17:45	1:02:11	2nd place, silver medalist(s)
José Luis García; Pilot: Pedro José Andújar Bastida	Men's PTVI	12:58	1:05	29:45	0:51	20:20	1:03:55	7
Eva María Moral Pedrero	Women's PTWC	13:51	2:03	41:27	1:05	16:33	1:14:59	3rd place, bronze medalist(s)
Rakel Mateo Uriarte	Women's PTS2	14:24	2:22	41:58	1:24	30:29	1:30:37	7
Susana Rodríguez; Pilot: Sara Loehr Muñoz	Women's PTVI	13:46	1:17	31:36	0:57	20:56	1:07:15	1st place, gold medalist(s)

== Wheelchair basketball ==
Spain's women's national wheelchair basketball team have qualified in the 2019 Europe Zonal Championships after a fourth-place finish. Netherlands, Great Britain and Germany were already qualified in the 2018 IWBF World Championships.

Team	Event	Group stage						Quarterfinal	Semifinal	Final / BM	
Team	Event	Opposition Score	Opposition Score	Opposition Score	Opposition Score	Opposition Score	Rank	Opposition Score	Opposition Score	Opposition Score	Rank
Spain men's	Men's tournament	South Korea; W 65-53	Canada; W 78-41	Colombia; W 74-56	Turkey; W 79-61	Japan; W 79-61	1 Q	Germany; W 71-68	United States; L 52-66	Bronze medal Match Great Britain; L 58-68	4
Spain women's	Women's tournament	United States; L 34-68	China; L 29-46	Algeria; W 80-8	Netherlands; L 24-63	—N/a	4 Q	Germany; L 33-57	Did not advance	7th place match Great Britain; L 43-62	8

=== Men ===
The following is the Spain roster in the men's wheelchair basketball tournament of the 2020 Summer Paralympics.

Spain men's national wheelchair basketball team - 2020 Summer Paralympics roster
Players
Coaches

No.	Name	Age – Date of birth	Pts.
5	Daniel Stix Soto	24 – 24 June 1997	1.5
7	Jesus Zarzuela Beltran Pablo	34 – 2 April 1987	3.0
8	Francisco Sanchez Lara	32 – 11 August 1989	1.0
9	Alejandro Zarzuela Beltran	34 – 2 April 1987	3.0
10	Amadou Diallo Diouf	29 – 4 January 1992	3.0
11	Jordi Ruiz Jordan	30 – 2 December 1990	2.5
13	Asier Garcia Pereiro	40 – 11 June 1981	4.0
14	David Mouriz Dopico	38 – 31 December 1982	2.5
16	Oscar Onrubia Gonzalez	21 – 11 May 2000	1.5
24	Ignacio Ortega Lafuente	20 – 30 October 2000	4.0
28	Manuel Lorenzo Diaz	21 – 22 September 1999	3.0
51	Agustín Alejos Alonso	33 – 8 November 1987	4.5

Head coach

Oscar Trigo Diez

Assistant coach(es)

Francisco Lopez Martinez, Javier Carvajal Pichel

Legend

- Age - describes age on 24 August 2021

=== Women ===
The following is the Spain roster in the women's wheelchair basketball tournament of the 2020 Summer Paralympics.

Spain women's national wheelchair basketball team - 2020 Summer Paralympics roster
Players
Coaches

No.	Name	Age – Date of birth	Pts.
4	Lourdes Ortega Rico	23 – 22 September 1997	1.0
6	Sonia Ruiz Escribano	40 – 6 May 1981	2.5
8	Beatriz Zudaire Garcia	21 – 8 June 2000	3.0
9	Sara Revuelta Garcia	23 – 26 August 1997	1.0
11	Virginia Perez Gutierrez	33 – 12 January 1988	4.0
12	Judith Nunez Milan	35 – 30 June 1986	2.0
13	Maria Alonso Vilarino	39 – 7 July 1982	4.0
15	Almudena Montiel Cortijo	30 – 7 May 1991	2.0
44	Gabriela Navarro Rodriguez	28 – 14 October 1992	4.0
51	Agurtzane Egiluz Ibarguen	24 – 18 April 1997	3.0
55	Isabel Lopez Chavez	29 – 6 July 1992	4.5
88	Maria Ruiz Ruiz	56 – 21 December 1964	2.0

Head coach

Abraham Carrion Ruiz

Assistant coach(es)

Marta Vargas Arevalo, David Benitez Sanchez

Legend

- Age - describes age on 24 August 2021

== Wheelchair tennis ==
Spain qualified four players entries for wheelchair tennis. All of them qualified by the world rankings.

Athlete	Event	Round of 64	Round of 32	Round of 16	Quarterfinals	Semifinals	Final / BM	
Athlete	Event	Opposition Result	Opposition Result	Opposition Result	Opposition Result	Opposition Result	Opposition Result	Rank
Daniel Caverzaschi	Men's singles	Bailey (GBR); W 6–2, 6–0	Maripa (RSA); W 6–2, 6–4	Gérard (BEL); W 6–3, 6–4	Egberink (NED); L 4–6, 3–6	Did not advance		5
Martin de la Puente	Men's singles	Ledesma (ARG); W 6–1, 6–1	Jaroszewski (POL); W 6–1, 6–1	Houdet (FRA); L 3–6, 0–6	Did not advance			9
Enrique Siscar Meseguer	Men's singles	Miki (JPN); L 1–6, 2–6	Did not advance					33
Francesc Tur	Men's singles	Suwan (THA); W 6–1, 6–4	Fernández (ARG); L 1–6, 0–6	Did not advance				17
Enrique Siscar Meseguer; Francesc Tur	Men's doubles	Bye	Flax / Langmann (AUT); L 6–3, 4–6, 5–7	Did not advance				17
Daniel Caverzaschi; Martin de la Puente	Men's doubles	Bye	Bye	Ratzlaff / Stroud (USA); W 6–1, 6–2	Houdet / Peifer (FRA); L 3–6, 4–6	Did not advance		5

== See also ==
- Spain at the Paralympics
- Spain at the 2020 Summer Olympics
