= 2020 World Para Swimming European Open Championships – Women's 200 metre freestyle =

The women's 200m freestyle events at the 2020 World Para Swimming European Championships were held at the Penteada Olympic Pools Complex.

== Medalists ==
| Event | Gold | Silver | Bronze |
|---|---|---|---|
| S5 | Monica Boggioni; Italy | Gina Böttcher; Germany | Sumeyye Boyaci; Turkey |
| S14 | Jessica-Jane Applegate; Great Britain | Pernilla Lindberg; Sweden | Michelle Alonso Morales; Spain |

== Results ==
=== S14 ===
Heat 1

| Rank | Name | Nationality | Time | Notes |
|---|---|---|---|---|
| 1 | Pernilla Lindberg | Sweden | 2:14.40 | Q |
| 2 | Jessica-Jane Applegate | Great Britain | 2:14.81 | Q |
| 3 | Eva Coronado Tejeda | Spain | 2:18.41 | Q |
| 4 | Michelle Alonso Morales | Spain | 2:18.85 | Q |
| 5 | Janina Falk | Austria | 2:20.22 | Q |
| 6 | Olga Poteshkina | Russia | 2:20.77 | Q |
| 7 | Janina Breuer | Germany | 2:20.90 | Q |
| 8 | Assya Maurin Espiau | France | 2:30.68 | Q |
| 9 | Giorgia Marchi | Italy | 2:39.62 | |

Final

| Rank | Name | Nationality | Time | Notes |
|---|---|---|---|---|
| 1st place, gold medalist(s) | Jessica-Jane Applegate | Great Britain | 2:12.26 | |
| 2nd place, silver medalist(s) | Pernilla Lindberg | Sweden | 2:13.85 | |
| 3rd place, bronze medalist(s) | Michelle Alonso Morales | Spain | 2:15.80 | |
| 4 | Eva Coronado Tejeda | Spain | 2:17.86 | |
| 5 | Janina Breuer | Germany | 2:18.15 | |
| 6 | Olga Poteshkina | Russia | 2:20.09 | |
| 7 | Janina Falk | Austria | 2:22.89 | |
| 8 | Assya Maurin Espiau | France | 2:25.21 | |
