= Zheng Tao (swimmer) =

Chinese Paralympic swimmer

Personal information
- Nickname: armless swimmer
- Born: 26 December 1990 (age 35) Kunming City, China
- Spouse: Yang Meili
- Other interests: Fishing

Sport
- Sport: Swimming
- Disability: Limb deficiency (Acquired)
- Disability class: S5/SB6/SM5
- Club: Yunnan Province [Kunming, CHN]
- Coached by: Zhang, Honghu
Medal record
Men's Paralympic swimming
Representing China
Summer Paralympics
Gold medal – first place	2012 London	100 m backstroke S6
Gold medal – first place	2016 Rio de Janeiro	100 m backstroke S6
Gold medal – first place	2020 Tokyo	50 m butterfly S5
Gold medal – first place	2020 Tokyo	50m backstroke S5
Gold medal – first place	2020 Tokyo	50m freestyle S5
Gold medal – first place	2020 Tokyo	Mixed 4 × 50 m freestyle relay 20pts
Silver medal – second place	2016 Rio de Janeiro	50 m butterfly S6
Bronze medal – third place	2012 London	50 m freestyle S6
Bronze medal – third place	2012 London	200 m ind. medley SM6
IPC Swimming World Championships
Gold medal – first place	2013 Montreal	50m Butterfly S6
Gold medal – first place	2013 Montreal	100m Backstroke S6
Gold medal – first place	2015 Glasgow	50m Butterfly S6
Gold medal – first place	2015 Glasgow	100m Backstroke S6
Silver medal – second place	2013 Montreal	50m Freestyle S6
Silver medal – second place	2015 Glasgow	50m Freestyle S6

Zheng Tao (Chinese: 郑涛; born 26 December 1990) is a Chinese para swimmer and five-time Paralympic champion. He is known as the "armless swimmer". He made a world record by winning 4 gold medals in Tokyo 2020 Paralympic.

== Early life ==
Zheng lost his arms due to an electric shock when he was a child.

== Swimming career ==
In 2004 Zheng took up the sport of Swimming and in 2010 he made his international swimming debut when Zheng represented China at the World Championships in Eindhoven, Netherlands.

Zheng competed in his first Paralympic Games at the 2012 London Paralympics, where he won the gold medal in a close race in the 100m backstroke S6 final.

At the 2016 Summer Paralympics in Rio de Janeiro, he suffered a lower back injury but still won the gold medal at the Men's 100 metre backstroke S6 event with a world record of 1:10.84, two seconds faster than the previous record, which was established by himself in 2015. He then caught the stomach flu on the day of the 50-metre butterfly S6 final, and lost to his teammate Xu Qing, winning a silver medal in the event.

At the 2020 Summer Paralympics in Tokyo, he won the gold medal at the Men's Butterfly S5 event with a world record of 30.62, the gold medal at the Men's Backstroke S5 event with a world record of 31.42 and the gold medal at the 50m Freestyle S5. He also won the gold medal at the Mixed 4x50m Freestyle Relay - 20 Points.
