= Swimming at the 2016 Summer Paralympics – Men's 200 metre freestyle S5 =

Men's 200 metre freestyle S5 at the XV Paralympic Games
- Venue: Olympic Aquatics Stadium
- Dates: 8 September 2016
- Competitors: 13 from 13 nations

Medalists
1st place, gold medalist(s)		Daniel Dias	Brazil
2nd place, silver medalist(s)		Roy Perkins	United States
3rd place, bronze medalist(s)		Andrew Mullen	Great Britain

The Men's 200 metre freestyle S5 event at the 2016 Paralympic Games took place on 8 September 2016, at the Olympic Aquatics Stadium. Two heats were held. The swimmers with the eight fastest times advanced to the final.

== Heats ==
=== Heat 1 ===
11:31 8 September 2016:

Rank	Lane	Name	Nationality	Time	Notes
1	5	Roy Perkins	United States	2:39.69	Q
2	4	Andrew Mullen	Great Britain	2:43.20	Q
3	3	James Scully	Ireland	2:53.17	Q
4	2	Diego Lopez Diaz	Mexico	2:59.82	
5	6	Junsheng Li	China	3:03.55	
6	7	Danial Murphy	Canada	3:07.41	

=== Heat 2 ===
11:37 8 September 2016:

Rank	Lane	Name	Nationality	Time	Notes
1	4	Daniel Dias	Brazil	2:39.35	Q
2	5	Theo Curin	France	2:47.47	Q
3	2	Cameron Leslie	New Zealand	2:52.21	Q
4	6	Giovanni Sciaccaluga	Italy	2:54.48	Q
5	3	Sebastian Rodriguez	Spain	2:55.36	Q
6	7	Takayuki Suzuki	Japan	2:58.74	
7	1	Jonas Larsen	Denmark	3:00.41	

== Final ==
19:59 8 September 2016:

Rank	Lane	Name	Nationality	Time	Notes
1st place, gold medalist(s)	4	Daniel Dias	Brazil	2:27.88	
2nd place, silver medalist(s)	5	Roy Perkins	United States	2:38.56	
3rd place, bronze medalist(s)	3	Andrew Mullen	Great Britain	2:40.65	
4	6	Theo Curin	France	2:44.79	
5	8	Sebastian Rodriguez	Spain	2:50.53	
6	7	James Scully	Ireland	2:51.45	
7	1	Giovanni Sciaccaluga	Italy	2:51.63	
8	2	Cameron Leslie	New Zealand	2:52.10	
