= Swimming at the 2020 Summer Paralympics – Men's 100 metre breaststroke SB5 =

Men's 100 metre breaststroke SB5 at the XVI Paralympic Games
- Venue: Tokyo Aquatics Centre
- Dates: 28 August 2021
- Competitors: 9 from 8 nations

Medalists
1st place, gold medalist(s)		Andrei Granichka	RPC
2nd place, silver medalist(s)		Antoni Ponce Bertran	Spain
3rd place, bronze medalist(s)		Li Junsheng	China

The men's 100 metre breaststroke SB5 event at the 2020 Paralympic Games took place on 28 August 2021, at the Tokyo Aquatics Centre.

== Heats ==
The swimmers with the top eight times, regardless of heat, advanced to the final.

Rank	Heat	Lane	Name	Nationality	Time	Notes
1	2	4	Antoni Ponce Bertran	Spain	1:26.72	Q, PR
2	1	4	Andrei Granichka	RPC	1:28.20	Q
3	1	5	Iurii Luchkin	RPC	1:31.06	Q
4	2	5	Li Junsheng	China	1:32.11	Q
5	2	3	Leo McCrea	Switzerland	1:33.86	Q
6	1	3	Roberto Alcalde Rodriguez	Brazil	1:35.66	Q
7	2	6	Thanh Hai Do	Vietnam	1:35.97	Q
8	1	6	Ivo Rocha	Portugal	1:43.06	Q
9	2	2	Hendrik van der Merwe	South Africa	1:46.22	

== Final ==
100m breaststroke final
Rank	Lane	Name	Nationality	Time	Notes
1st place, gold medalist(s)	5	Andrei Granichka	RPC	1:25.13	WR
2nd place, silver medalist(s)	4	Antoni Ponce Bertran	Spain	1:26.53	
3rd place, bronze medalist(s)	6	Li Junsheng	China	1:29.01	
4	3	Iurii Luchkin	RPC	1:31.34	
5	2	Leo McCrea	Switzerland	1:34.29	
6	1	Thanh Hai Do	Vietnam	1:35.68	
7	7	Roberto Alcalde Rodriguez	Brazil	1:36.75	
8	8	Ivo Rocha	Portugal	1:44.65	
