= Bernabé Costas =

Spanish wheelchair basketball player

Bernabe Costas de Miranda
Personal information
- Nationality: Spanish
- Born: 16 January 1980 (age 46) Galicia

Sport
- Country: Spain
- Sport: Wheelchair basketball

Bernabe Costas de Miranda (born 16 January 1980) is a professional wheelchair basketball player from Spain. As a member of Spain men's national wheelchair basketball team, he earned a bronze at the 2011 European Championships, and a fifth-place finish at the 2012 Summer Paralympics. He has spent most of his professional career playing for Aldasa Amfiv de Vigo in Spain's top level domestic wheelchair basketball league.

== Personal ==
Costas was born on 16 January 1980 in Galicia. He resided in Gondomar, Pontevedra in 2012.

== Wheelchair basketball ==
A professional wheelchair basketball player, Costas is a center, and a 2.5 point player. He first started playing wheelchair basketball with the Spanish team Aldasa Amfiv de Vigo.

=== National team ===
Costas was part of the Spain men's national wheelchair basketball team that competed at the 2009 European Championships. He was the team's top scorer in the game against Germany during the competition.

His selection to represent Spain at the 2011 European Championships was made in March. Nazareth, Israel hosted the 2011 European tournament. As a member of the 2011 team, he earned a bronze medal.

The official selection for the 2012 Games team was made in late June 2012 by the Spanish Federation of Sports for the Physically Disabled. It came after a wheelchair basketball tournament in Worcester. He was one of two Galicians chosen for the squad, and one of twelve Galicians on the whole Spanish team. He arrived in Madrid for a national team training camp held at the High Performance Centre, Madrid ahead of the London Paralympics. On the third day of the camp, He bruised the scaphoid bone as a result of a fall on his left hand. He departed for London with the rest of the team to prepare for the Games on 17 August. He and the rest of the team moved into the Paralympic Village on 25 August.

Coached by Oscar Trigo, London was the first time the Spanish men's national team had qualified for the Paralympics in 16 years. The Games were Costa's first. His team finished fifth overall. He played very few minutes in the tournament because of an injury. He scored two points in the game against Germany.

=== Club ===
Costas played for Aldasa Amfiv de Vigo in Spain's top level domestic wheelchair basketball competition during the 2009/2010, 2010/2011, 2011/2012, and 2012/2013 seasons. While starting and spending most of his playing career with Aldasa Amfiv de Vigo, Costas and national team teammate David Mouriz Dopico both left the team for two seasons to play for a Barcelona club before returning to Vigo. While having the opportunity to play for other clubs, he chose to remain with Vigo following the Paralympics because it put him closer to his family. He joined the team for their 2012/2013 preseason training camp in late September 2012.
