= Eva Coronado Tejeda =

Spanish Paralympic swimmer

Personal information
- Born: 16 May 1999 (age 27) Aldaia, Spain

Sport
- Sport: Paralympic swimming
- Disability class: S14
Medal record
Representing Spain
European Championships
| Gold medal – first place | 2021 Funchal | 4x100m medley relay |
| Bronze medal – third place | 2018 Dublin | 100m backstroke S14 |
INAS World Championships
| Gold medal – first place | 2021 Montlucon | 50m freestyle II1 |
| Gold medal – first place | 2021 Montlucon | 100m freestyle II1 |
| Gold medal – first place | 2021 Montlucon | 200m freestyle II1 |
| Gold medal – first place | 2021 Montlucon | 100m backstroke II1 |
| Gold medal – first place | 2021 Montlucon | 50m breaststroke II1 |
| Gold medal – first place | 2021 Montlucon | 50m butterfly II1 |
INAS European Championships
| Silver medal – second place | 2018 Villejuif | 200m freestyle II1 |
| Silver medal – second place | 2018 Villejuif | 200m backstroke II1 |
| Silver medal – second place | 2018 Villejuif | 200m butterfly II1 |
| Silver medal – second place | 2018 Villejuif | 4x50m freestyle relay II1 |
| Silver medal – second place | 2018 Villejuif | 4x100m freestyle relay II1 |
| Silver medal – second place | 2018 Villejuif | 4x200m freestyle relay II1 |
| Silver medal – second place | 2018 Villejuif | 4x100m medley relay II1 |
| Bronze medal – third place | 2018 Villejuif | 100m freestyle II1 |
| Bronze medal – third place | 2018 Villejuif | 50m backstroke II1 |

Eva Coronado Tejeda (born 16 May 1999) is a Spanish Paralympic swimmer who competes in international swimming competitions. She is a European bronze medalist. She competed at the 2020 and 2024 Summer Paralympics.

== Disability ==
At six years old, Coronado suffered from a brain injury that left her with cognitive difficulties.
