= Swimming at the 2020 Summer Paralympics – Mixed 4 × 50 metre freestyle relay 20pts =

Mixed 4 × 50 metre freestyle relay – 20 points at the XVI Paralympic Games
- Venue: Tokyo Aquatics Centre
- Dates: 26 August 2021
- Competitors: from 13 nations

The Mixed 4 x 50 metre freestyle relay – 20 points swimming event at the 2020 Paralympic Games took place on 26 August 2021, at the Tokyo Aquatics Centre.

== Competition format ==
Each event consists of two rounds: heats and final. The top eight teams overall in the heats progressed to the final. Relay teams consist of two men and two women, and are based on a point score. The sport class of an individual swimmer is worth the actual number value i.e. sport class S6 is worth six points, sport class SB12 is worth twelve points, and so on. The total of all the competitors must add up to 20 points or less.

== Records ==
Prior to this competition, the existing world and Olympic records were as follows.

World record	China; Peng Qiuping (S3); Jiang Shennang (S8); Huang Wenpan (S3); Xu Qing (S6)	2:18.03	Rio de Janeiro, Brazil	9 September 2016
Paralympic record	China; Peng Qiuping (S3); Jiang Shennang (S8); Huang Wenpan (S3); Xu Qing (S6)	2:18.03	Rio de Janeiro, Brazil	9 September 2016

== Heats ==
The swimmers with the top 8 times, regardless of heat, advanced to the final.

Rank	Heat	Lane	Name	Nationality	Time	Notes
1	1	4		Italy	2:25.48	Q
2	2	5		Ukraine	2:27.98	Q
3	2	6		Spain	2:29.24	Q
4	2	4		China	2:31.06	Q
5	2	3		RPC	2:36.57	Q
6	1	5		Brazil	2:38.01	Q
7	1	2		Great Britain	2:42.42	Q
8	2	2		Turkey	2:44.80	Q
9	1	3		Japan	2:44.89	
10	2	1		Colombia	3:01.49	
11	2	7		Greece	3:03.25	
12	1	7		Egypt	3:19.56	
	1	6		Germany		

== Final ==
Rank	Lane	Name	Nationality	Time	Notes
1st place, gold medalist(s)	6		China	2:15.49	WR
2nd place, silver medalist(s)	4		Italy	2:21.45	
3rd place, bronze medalist(s)	7		Brazil	2:24.82	
4	5		Ukraine	2:24.89	
5	3		Spain	2:25.66	
6	2		RPC	2:35.66	
7	8		Turkey	2:42.43	
8	1		Great Britain	2:48.34	
