= David Mouriz =

Spanish wheelchair basketball player

David Mouriz Dopico
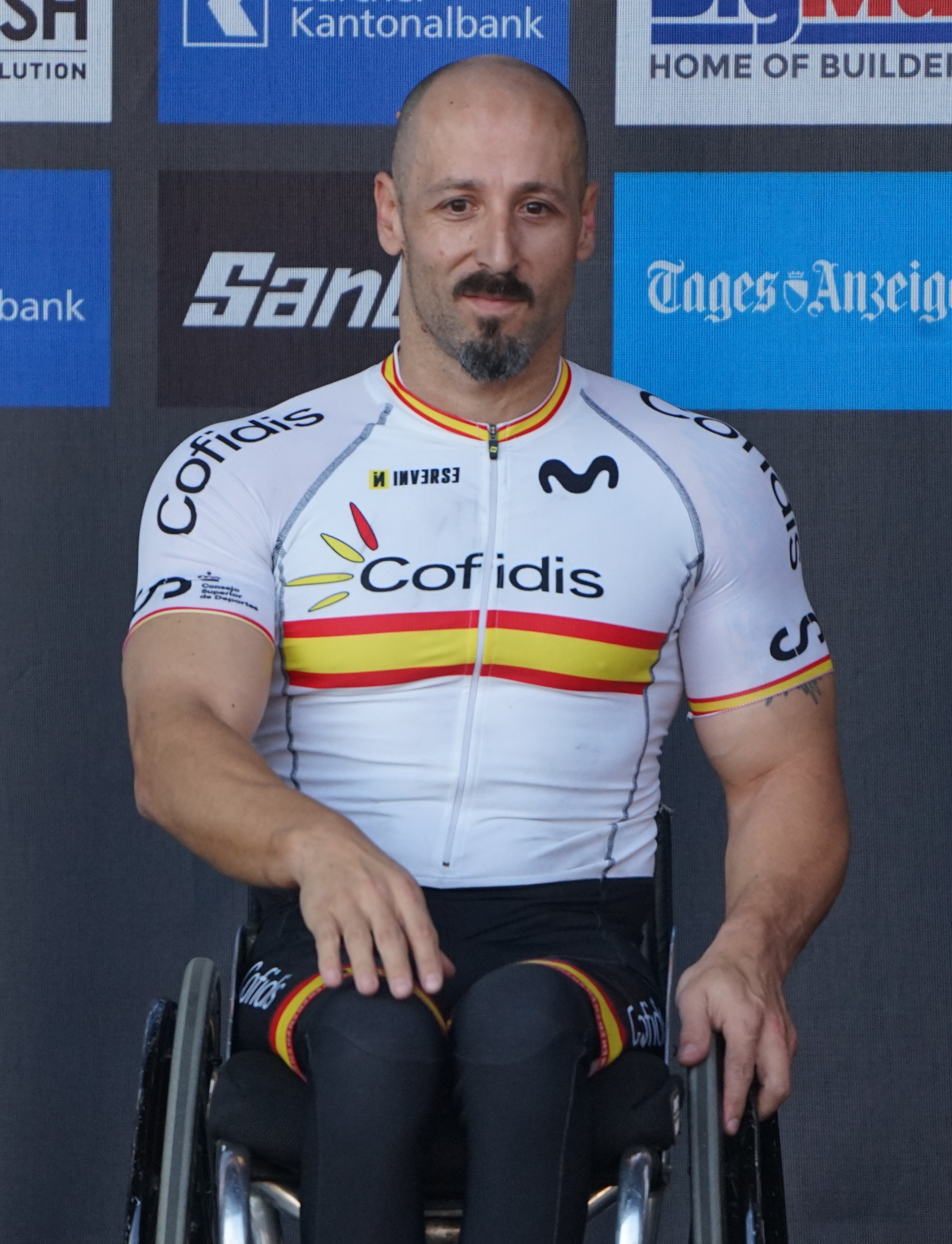
- Mouriz at the 2024 UCI Para-cycling Road World Championships

Personal information
- Nationality: Spanish
- Born: December 31, 1982 (age 43) Ferrol, Galicia, Spain

Sport
- Country: Spain
- Sport: Wheelchair basketball
Medal record
Men's Para-cycling
Representing Spain
Road World Championships
Bronze medal – third place	2024 Zurich	Mixed team relay H1–5

David Mouriz Dopico (born December 31, 1982) is a Spanish professional wheelchair basketball player. A 2.5 point player, he was a member of the Spain men's national team that finished fifth at the 2012 Summer Paralympics, and third at the 2013 European Championships. He has played professionally in Spain's top division for Aldasa Amfiv de Vigo, FCBarcelona and Bilbao BSR.

== Personal ==
Mouriz was born in Ferrol, Galicia on December 31, 1982, and he continued to reside in Galicia in 2012 and 2013.

== Wheelchair basketball ==
Costas is a professional 2.5 point wheelchair basketball player.

=== National team ===
The official selection for the 2012 Games team was made in late June 2012 by the Spanish Federation of Sports for the Physically Disabled. It came after a wheelchair basketball tournament in Worcester. Mouriz was one of two Galacians chosen for the squad, and one of twelve Galacians on the whole Spain team. He arrived in Madrid for a national team training camp held at the High Performance Centre, Madrid ahead of the London Paralympics. He departed for London with the rest of the team to prepare for the Games on August 17. He and the rest of the team moved into the Paralympic Village on August 25. The London Games were his first.

Coached by Oscar Trigo, it was the first time the Spanish national team had qualified for the Paralympics in 16 years. His team finished fifth overall. He played in the game against Germany, where he scored three points. He averaged about 10 to 15 minutes of court time per game.

Competing for Spain at the 2013 IWBF European Championships, Mouriz won a bronze medal after defeating Sweden. He was third on the team in total scoring in the bronze medal game against Sweden with 9 points, while getting 2 rebounds and 3 assists.

=== Club ===
Mouriz first played club wheelchair basketball for Aldasa Amfiv de Vigo in Spain's top level domestic wheelchair basketball competition. While he spent most of his playing career with Vigo, Mouriz and national team teammate Bernabe Costas de Miranda both left the team for two seasons to play for FCBarcelona before returning to Vigo. He was with the team during the 2011/2012 season. Following the London Games, he took a break from the sport for a few weeks. When that ended, he had a scheduled meeting with management for Vigo to discuss his future with the team. They were concerned that his Paralympic Games experience make him more monetarily valuable and require an increase in pay to keep him with the team that they might not have been able to afford.

For the 2012/2013, Mouriz ended up playing club wheelchair basketball for Bilbao BSR. He transferred to the team because he had a good relationship with national team teammate Asier Garcia Pereiro who plays for Bilbao and the coach, Javier Sandomingo. He trained away from his new Bilbao teammates before the official start of the season. In a match for Bilbao against Getafe during the 2013 season, he set the pace for game while scoring 20 points for his team. In a game against Mideba Extremadura, he scored 26 points. In a game against ONCE, he scored 8 points in his team's loss.
