= Daniel Dias =

Brazilian Paralympic swimmer (born 1988)

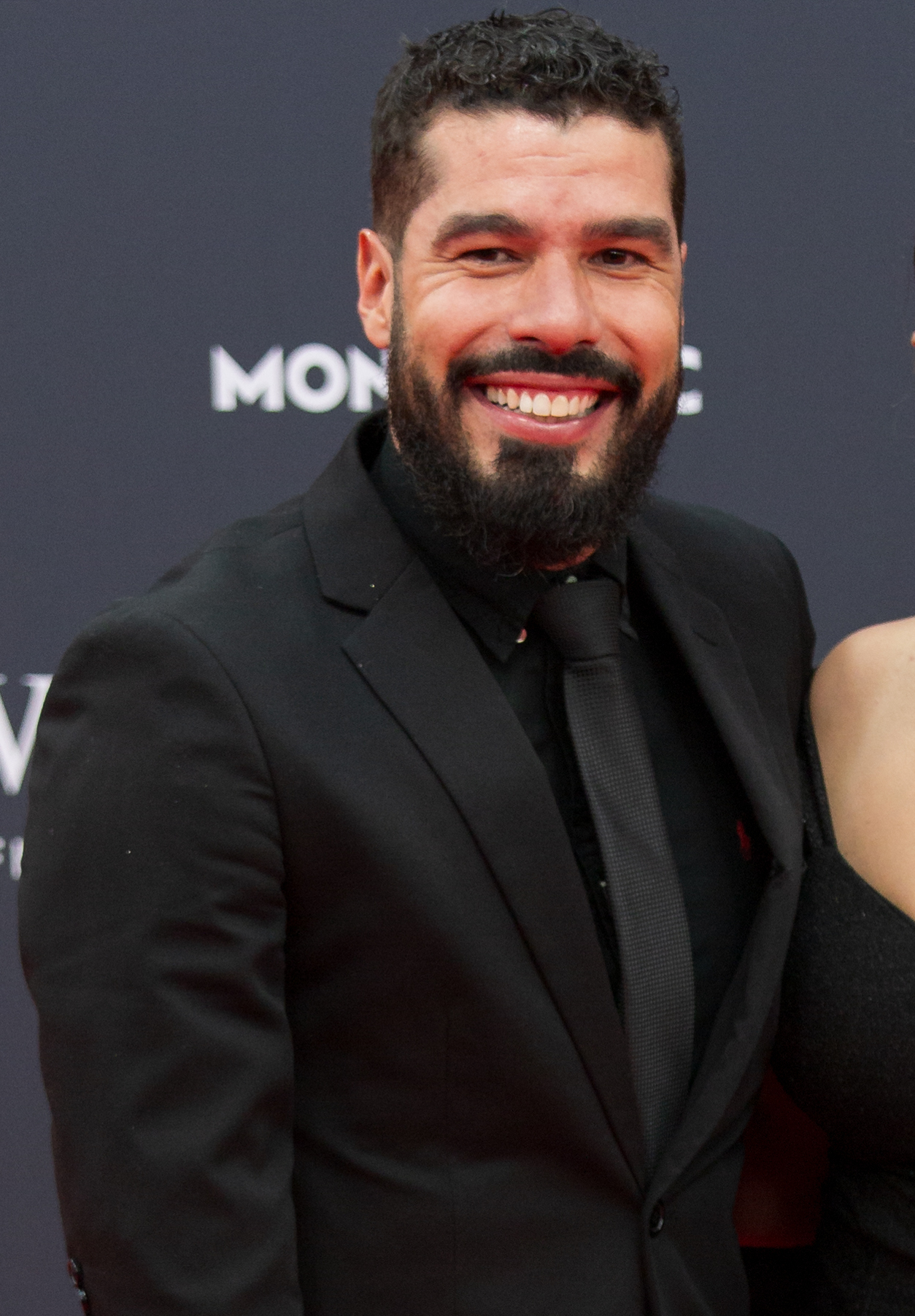
- Dias at the 25th Laureus World Sports Awards in 2024

Personal information
- Full name: Daniel de Faria Dias
- Nickname: Dani
- Nationality: Brazilian
- Born: 24 May 1988 (age 38) Campinas, São Paulo
- Website: www.danieldias.esp.br

Sport
- Sport: Swimming
Medal record
Men's swimming
Representing Brazil
Event	1st	2nd	3rd
Paralympic Games	14	7	6
World Championships	31	7	2
Parapan American Games	33	0	0
Total	78	14	8
Paralympic Games
Gold medal – first place	2008 Beijing	100 m freestyle
Gold medal – first place	2008 Beijing	200 m freestyle
Gold medal – first place	2008 Beijing	50 m backstroke
Gold medal – first place	2008 Beijing	200 m medley
Gold medal – first place	2012 London	50 m freestyle S5
Gold medal – first place	2012 London	100 m freestyle S5
Gold medal – first place	2012 London	200 m freestyle S5
Gold medal – first place	2012 London	50 m backstroke S5
Gold medal – first place	2012 London	50 m butterfly S5
Gold medal – first place	2012 London	100 m breaststroke SB4
Gold medal – first place	2016 Rio	50 m freestyle S5
Gold medal – first place	2016 Rio	100 m freestyle S5
Gold medal – first place	2016 Rio	200 m freestyle S5
Gold medal – first place	2016 Rio	50 m backstroke S5
Silver medal – second place	2008 Beijing	50 m freestyle
Silver medal – second place	2008 Beijing	50 m butterfly
Silver medal – second place	2008 Beijing	100 m breaststroke
Silver medal – second place	2008 Beijing	4×50 m medley 20pts
Silver medal – second place	2016 Rio	100 m breaststroke SB4
Silver medal – second place	2016 Rio	4×50 m mixed freestyle 20pts
Silver medal – second place	2016 Rio	4×100 m freestyle relay 34pts
Bronze medal – third place	2008 Beijing	4×50 m freestyle 20pts
Bronze medal – third place	2016 Rio	50 m butterfly S5
Bronze medal – third place	2016 Rio	4×100 m medley relay 34pts
Bronze medal – third place	2020 Tokyo	100 m freestyle S5
Bronze medal – third place	2020 Tokyo	200 m freestyle S5
Bronze medal – third place	2020 Tokyo	Mixed 4×50 m freestyle relay 20pts
Parapan American Games
Gold medal – first place	Rio 2007	100 m freestyle
Gold medal – first place	Rio 2007	100 m breaststroke
Gold medal – first place	Rio 2007	200 m freestyle
Gold medal – first place	Rio 2007	50 m butterfly
Gold medal – first place	Rio 2007	50 m backstroke
Gold medal – first place	Rio 2007	50 m freestyle
Gold medal – first place	Rio 2007	4×50 m medley
Gold medal – first place	Rio 2007	4×100 m medley
Gold medal – first place	Guadalajara 2011	50 m freestyle
Gold medal – first place	Guadalajara 2011	4×50 m medley
Gold medal – first place	Guadalajara 2011	50 m backstroke
Gold medal – first place	Guadalajara 2011	100 m freestyle
Gold medal – first place	Guadalajara 2011	4×100 m freestyle
Gold medal – first place	Guadalajara 2011	50 m butterfly
Gold medal – first place	Guadalajara 2011	4×50 m freestyle
Gold medal – first place	Guadalajara 2011	200 m medley
Gold medal – first place	Guadalajara 2011	100 m breaststroke
Gold medal – first place	Guadalajara 2011	4×200 m medley
Gold medal – first place	Guadalajara 2011	200 m freestyle
Gold medal – first place	Toronto 2015	50 m freestyle
Gold medal – first place	Toronto 2015	100 m freestyle
Gold medal – first place	Toronto 2015	200 m freestyle
Gold medal – first place	Toronto 2015	50 m backstroke
Gold medal – first place	Toronto 2015	50 m butterfly
Gold medal – first place	Toronto 2015	4×50 m freestyle mixed (20 pts)
Gold medal – first place	Toronto 2015	4×100 m freestyle (34 pts)
Gold medal – first place	Toronto 2015	4×100 m medley (34 pts)
Gold medal – first place	Lima 2019	50 m freestyle
Gold medal – first place	Lima 2019	100 m freestyle
Gold medal – first place	Lima 2019	200 m freestyle
Gold medal – first place	Lima 2019	50 m backstroke
Gold medal – first place	Lima 2019	50 m butterfly
Gold medal – first place	Lima 2019	4×100 m medley (34 pts)
IPC Swimming World Championships
Gold medal – first place	2006 Durban	100 m freestyle
Gold medal – first place	2006 Durban	200 m medley
Gold medal – first place	2006 Durban	4×50 m medley 20pts
Gold medal – first place	2010 Eindhoven	50 m freestyle
Gold medal – first place	2010 Eindhoven	200 m medley
Gold medal – first place	2010 Eindhoven	50 m butterfly
Gold medal – first place	2010 Eindhoven	50 m backstroke
Gold medal – first place	2010 Eindhoven	200m freestyle
Gold medal – first place	2010 Eindhoven	100 m breaststroke
Gold medal – first place	2010 Eindhoven	4×50 m medley 20pts
Gold medal – first place	2010 Eindhoven	100 m freestyle
Gold medal – first place	2013 Montreal	50 m backstroke
Gold medal – first place	2013 Montreal	200 m medley
Gold medal – first place	2013 Montreal	50 m freestyle
Gold medal – first place	2013 Montreal	100 m freestyle
Gold medal – first place	2013 Montreal	200 m freestyle
Gold medal – first place	2013 Montreal	4×50 m relay 20pts
Gold medal – first place	2015 Glasgow	50 m backstroke
Gold medal – first place	2015 Glasgow	50 m butterfly
Gold medal – first place	2015 Glasgow	4×50 m mixed relay 20pts
Gold medal – first place	2015 Glasgow	100 m freestyle
Gold medal – first place	2015 Glasgow	200 m freestyle
Gold medal – first place	2015 Glasgow	50 m freestyle
Gold medal – first place	2015 Glasgow	100 m breaststroke
Gold medal – first place	2017 Mexico City	50 m freestyle
Gold medal – first place	2017 Mexico City	100 m freestyle
Gold medal – first place	2017 Mexico City	200 m freestyle
Gold medal – first place	2017 Mexico City	100 m backstroke
Gold medal – first place	2017 Mexico City	4×100 m freestyle relay 34pts
Gold medal – first place	2017 Mexico City	4×100 m medley relay 34 pts
Gold medal – first place	2019 London	50 m freestyle
Silver medal – second place	2006 Durban	50 m backstroke
Silver medal – second place	2006 Durban	50 m butterfly
Silver medal – second place	2010 Eindhoven	4×50m freestyle 20pts
Silver medal – second place	2013 Montreal	50 m butterfly
Silver medal – second place	2013 Montreal	4×50 m relay 34pts
Silver medal – second place	2015 Glasgow	100 m freestyle relay 34pts
Silver medal – second place	2019 London	100 m freestyle
Bronze medal – third place	2019 London	50 m backstroke
Bronze medal – third place	2019 London	50 m butterfly

Daniel de Faria Dias (born 24 May 1988) is a Brazilian Paralympic swimmer. Having learnt to swim in 2004 after being inspired by Clodoaldo Silva at the 2004 Summer Paralympics, he entered his first international competition two years later winning five medals. He competed in a wide range of swimming events at the 2008, 2012, 2016 and 2020 Paralympics and won 27 medals, including 14 gold medals.

== Early life ==
Dias was born in 1988 in Campinas, a city to the north of São Paulo. He was born with malformed upper and lower limbs. Dias began swimming at the age of 16, after being inspired by Clodoaldo Silva competing at the 2004 Summer Paralympics, and learned four styles of swimming in two months. He studied mechatronical engineering and physical education at the Universidade São Francisco.

== Career ==
His first major event was the 2006 IPC Swimming World Championships in Durban, South Africa. He won the gold medal in three events, and a silver medal in a further two. At the age of 20, he competed in his first Paralympic Games at Beijing in 2008. The Games proved highly successful for Dias, who won more medals than any other athlete. He received a total of nine medals including four golds, four silvers, and one bronze across a range of different distances and disciplines.

Dias won the Laureus Award in 2009 for Sportsperson of the Year with a Disability, being awarded it by British athlete Sebastian Coe at a ceremony in London. Dias was an ambassador for his country's bid for the 2016 Summer Olympics and Paralympics, and was present for the presentation of the Candidature File to the International Olympic Committee.

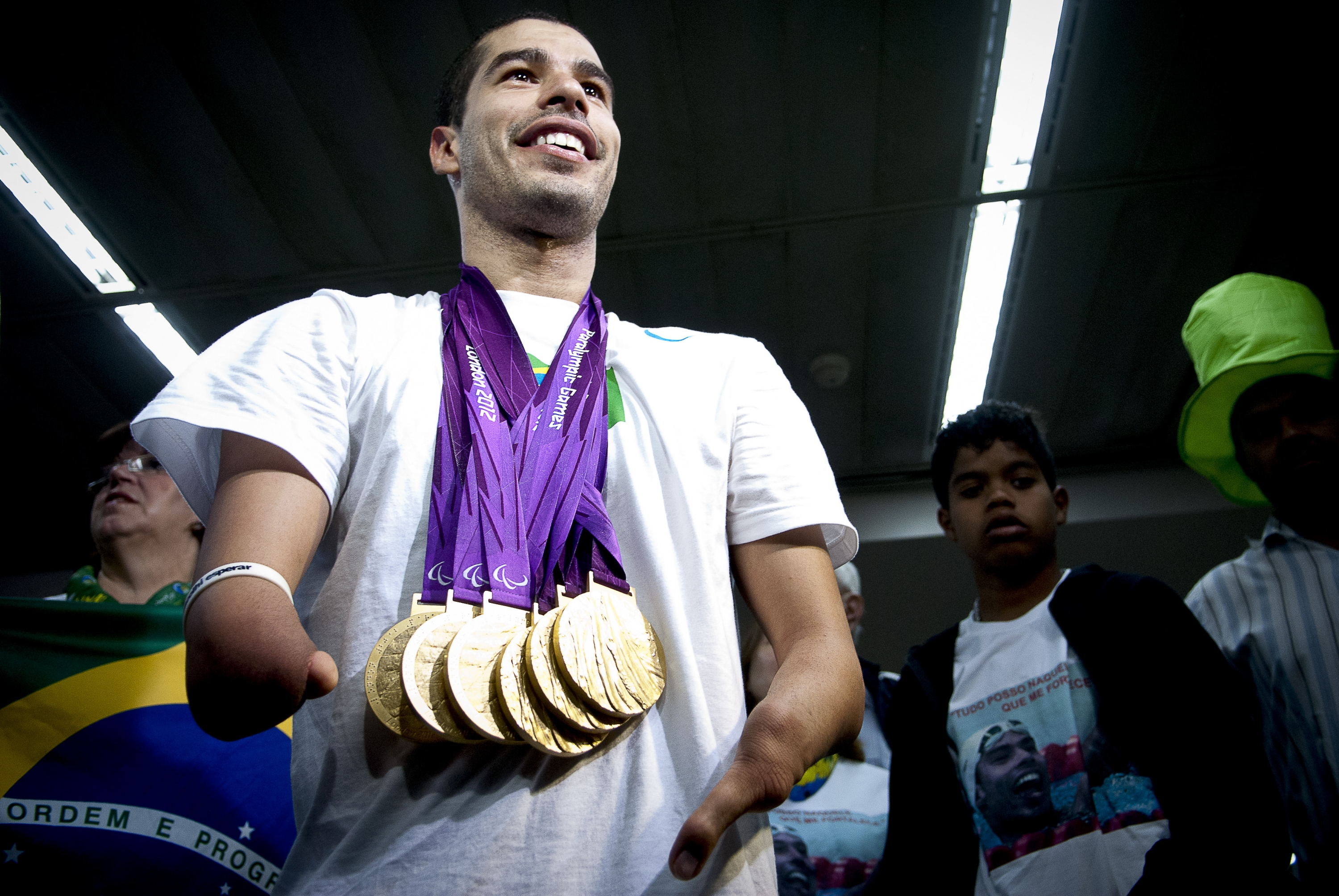
Dias homecoming in São Paulo after winning six gold medals in the 2012 Paralympics

Dias won the Sportsperson of the Year with a Disability for the second time in 2012 after winning 6 gold medals all in world record time at the 2012 Paralympic Games.

As of February 2013, he holds IPC long course swimming world records in all strokes, at a range of distances – 50, 100 and 200 metre freestyle (S5), 50 and 100 metres backstroke (S5), 50 and 100 metres butterfly (S5), 50 and 100 metres breaststroke (SB4) and 200 metre individual medley (SM5).

In 2016 he was compared to Michael Phelps, a retired non-Paralympic American competitive swimmer. Despite such an honorable comparison Daniel Dias said that he is Daniel Dias.

Awards
Preceded by (Australia) Matthew Cowdrey (Australia) Matthew Cowdrey	World Disabled Swimmer of the Year; 2009–2011; 2013	Succeeded by (Australia) Matthew Cowdrey (United States) Ian Silverman
Preceded by (South Africa) Oscar Pistorius	Laureus World Sportsperson with a Disability of the Year; 2013	Succeeded by (France) Marie Bochet
