= Antoni Ponce Bertran =

Spanish Paralympic swimmer

Antoni Ponce
Personal information
- Full name: Antoni Ponce Bertran
- Nationality: Spain
- Born: 5 June 1987 (age 39) Vilafranca del Penedès, Barcelona, Spain

Sport
- Sport: Paralympic swimming
- Disability class: S5, SB5
- Club: CN Sitges
- Coached by: Jaume Marce Gil
Medal record
Men's para swimming
Representing Spain
Paralympic Games
Silver medal – second place	2020 Tokyo	200 m freestyle S5
Silver medal – second place	2020 Tokyo	100 m breaststroke S5
Silver medal – second place	2024 Paris	100 m breaststroke SB5
World Championships
Gold medal – first place	2022 Madeira	200 m medley SM5
Gold medal – first place	2022 Madeira	100 m breaststroke SB5
Gold medal – first place	2023 Manchester	100 m breaststroke SB5
Silver medal – second place	2022 Madeira	50 m backstroke S5
Silver medal – second place	2022 Madeira	100 m freestyle S5
Silver medal – second place	2022 Madeira	200 m freestyle S5
Silver medal – second place	2023 Manchester	200 m freestyle S5
Silver medal – second place	2023 Manchester	200 m medley SM5
Silver medal – second place	2025 Singapore	200 m medley SM5
Silver medal – second place	2025 Singapore	100 m breaststroke SB5
Bronze medal – third place	2022 Madeira	4×50 m mixed medley 20pts
European Championships
Gold medal – first place	2024 Funchal	100 m breaststroke SB5
Gold medal – first place	2024 Funchal	4×50 m mixed freestyle 20 pts
Gold medal – first place	2024 Funchal	4×50 m mixed medley 20 pts
Silver medal – second place	2024 Funchal	50 m backstroke S5
Silver medal – second place	2024 Funchal	50 m butterfly S5
Bronze medal – third place	2026 Kocaeli	100 m breaststroke SB5
Bronze medal – third place	2024 Funchal	200 m medley SM6

Antoni Ponce Bertran (born 5 June 1987) is a Spanish Paralympic swimmer. He represented Spain at the 2016, 2020 and 2024 Summer Paralympics.

== Career ==
Ponce Bertran represented Spain in the men's 200 metre freestyle S5 event at the 2020 Summer Paralympics and won a silver medal. He currently holds both the Paralympic record and the World record in 100m breastsroke in the category SB5.
