= Muhammad Nur Syaiful Zulkafli =

Malaysian para swimmer

Personal information
- Nationality: Malaysian
- Born: 19 February 1995 (age 31) Sarawak, Malaysia

Sport
- Sport: Para swimming
- Disability class: S5
Medal record
World Championships
Bronze medal – third place	2019 London	50m Freestyle S5
Bronze medal – third place	2022 Madeira	50m Freestyle S5
Asian Para Games
Gold medal – first place	2018 Jakarta	50m freestyle S5
Gold medal – first place	2022 Hangzhou	100m breaststroke SB4
Silver medal – second place	2018 Jakarta	100m freestyle S5
Silver medal – second place	2018 Jakarta	200m freestyle S5
ASEAN Para Games
Silver medal – second place	2017 Kuala Lumpur	50m freestyle S5
Bronze medal – third place	2017 Kuala Lumpur	50m butterfly S5
Gold medal – first place	2022 Surakarta	50m freestyle S5
Gold medal – first place	2022 Surakarta	100m freestyle S5
Gold medal – first place	2023 Cambodia	50m breaststroke SB4
Bronze medal – third place	2023 Cambodia	Men's 4x100m medley relay 34pts

Muhammad Nur Syaiful bin Zulkafli (born 19 February 1995) is a Malaysian Paralympic swimmer.

== Career ==
He represented Malaysia at the 2020 Summer Paralympics held in Tokyo, Japan. In 2019, he competed at the 2019 World Para Swimming Championships held in London, United Kingdom and won bronze medal in the 50m Freestyle S5 event. In 2022, he competed at the 2022 World Para Swimming Championships held in Madeira, Portugal and won bronze medal in the 50m Freestyle S5 event.
