= Para swimming =

Sport of swimming athletes with disabilities

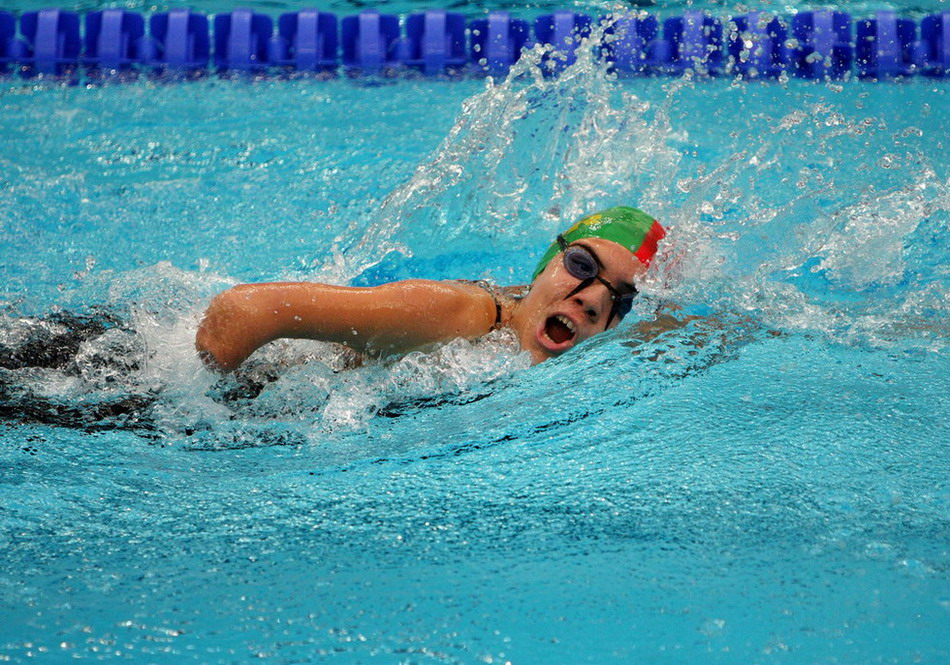
Swimming at the 2008 Summer Paralympics

Para swimming is an adaptation of the sport of swimming for athletes with disabilities. Para swimmers compete at the Summer Paralympic Games and at other sports competitions throughout the world. The sport is governed by the International Paralympic Committee (IPC). Both men and women compete in para swimming, racing against competitors of their own gender.

== History ==
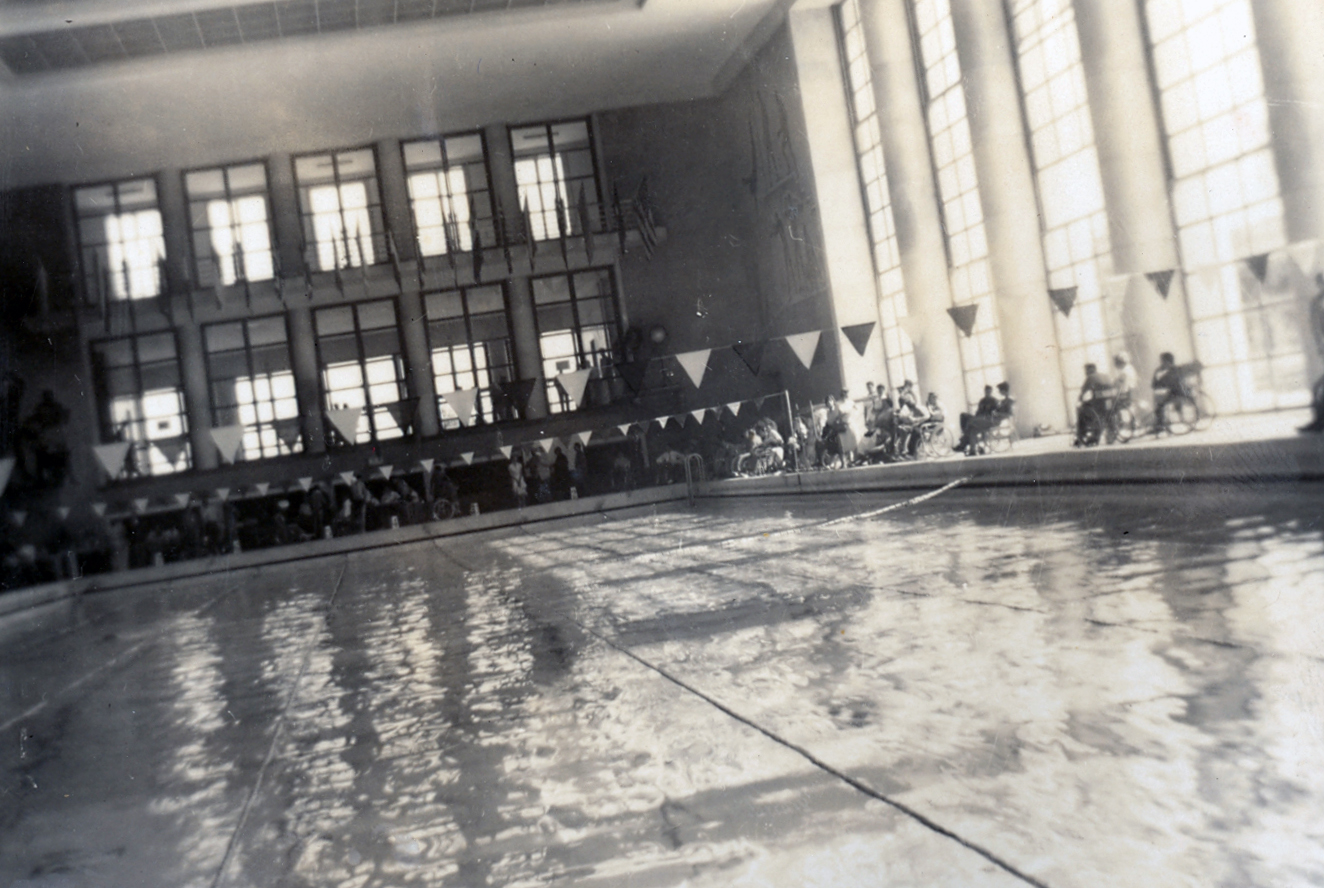
Swimming pool at the 1960 Rome Paralympic Games.

Para swimming made its Paralympic debut at the 1960 Summer Olympics games in Rome, featuring 77 athletes from 15 nations competing in 62 medal events. At its inception, the sport was limited to athletes with spinal cord injuries. Eligibility expanded in subsequent decades to include a broader range of physical, visual, and intellectual impairments. A major milestone occurred at the Toronto 1976 Paralympic Games with the inclusion of events for amputee and visually impaired athletes, significantly increasing participation and the number of events. Swimmers with intellectual impairments were later integrated into competition at the Sydney 2000 Paralympic Games. Governance of the sport evolved alongside its development, with early oversight by the International Swimming Training Association for the Paralyzed and eventual formalization under World Para Swimming, a sport-specific division of the IPC. Today, Para swimming is one of the largest and most globally participated sports in the Paralympic program, known for its "sport-first" approach, inclusivity and competitive depth.

== Rules ==
Rules for the sport are adapted from those set forth by the International Swimming Federation (FINA). Swimmers compete individually in backstroke, breaststroke, butterfly, freestyle, individual medley, and as teams in relay races. At the Paralympics, World Championships and other elite level competitions, swimmers compete in an Olympic-size swimming pool.

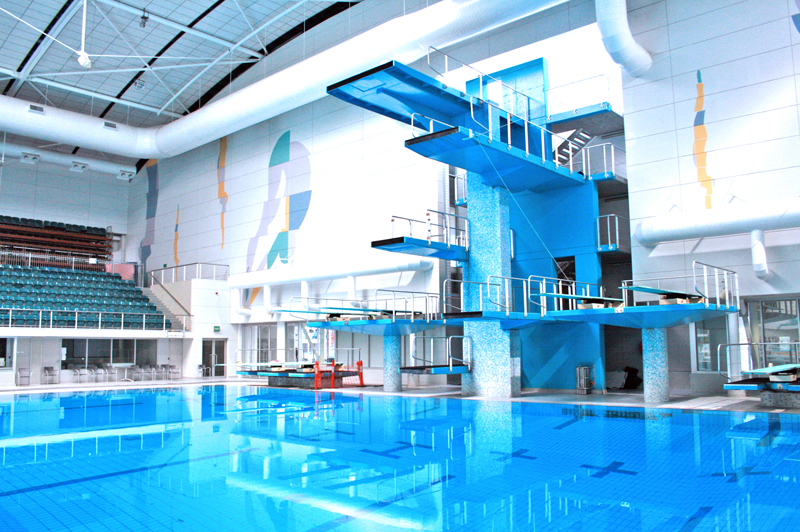
Swimming pool with multiple diving platforms

To ensure fair competition, Para swimming uses a classification system that groups athletes based on the nature and severity of their impairment. While all swimmers follow a standardized set of rules, certain modifications are applied depending on functional ability. For example, significant differences between able-bodied and Para swimming include swimmers starting a race by diving from a platform, sitting on the edge, or beginning directly in the water.

Additional adaptations exist for visually impaired swimmers. In events for blind athletes, assistants known as "tappers" use a pole to signal when the swimmer is approaching the wall, indicating when to turn or finish. The use of prostheses or assistive devices is not permitted during competition.

== Classification ==
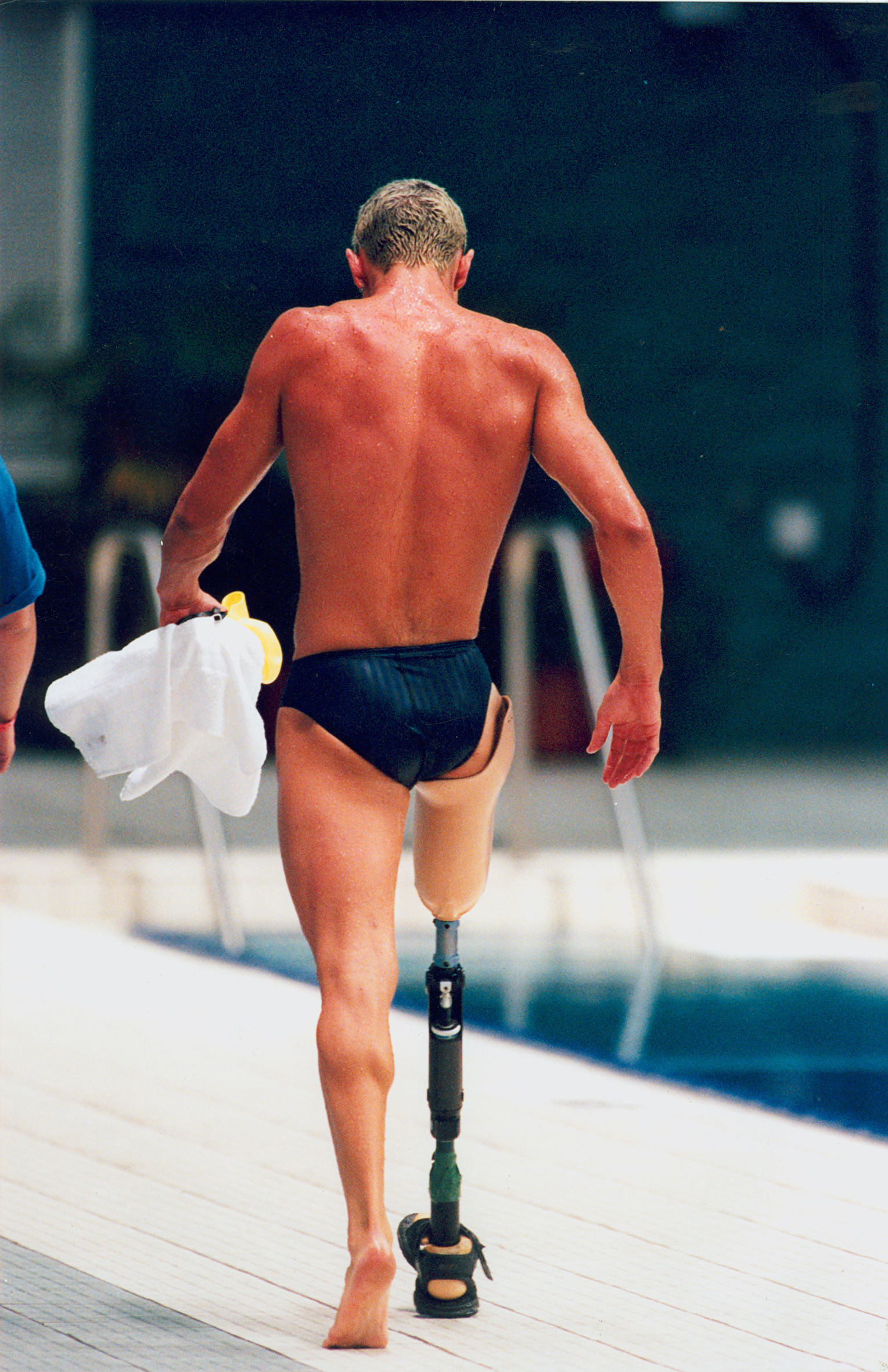
Australian swimmer Cameron de Burgh at the 1996 Summer Paralympics in Atlanta, USA.

Swimmers are classified according to the type and extent of their disability. The classification system allows swimmers to compete against others with a similar level of ability.

Swimmers with physical disabilities are allocated a category between 1 and 10, with 1 corresponding to the most severe types of disability. Physical disabilities of Para swimmers include single or multiple limb loss (through birth defects and/or amputation), cerebral palsy, spinal cord injuries (leading to paralysis or disability in limb coordination), dwarfism, and disabilities which impair the use of joints.

Blind and visually impaired swimmers compete within separate categories, being allocated to categories 11, 12 or 13. Category 11 corresponds to totally blind swimmers, while competitors in category 12 have severe but not total visual impairment. Category 11 swimmers compete with blackened goggles to ensure competitors are on an even level. Category 11 swimmers are also required to use tappers but they are optional for categories 12 and 13.

Swimmers with mental disabilities compete in category 14, while deaf and hearing impaired swimmers compete in category 15.

Numbers are combined with a letter prefix depending on the event type. An "S" prefix corresponds to freestyle, backstroke and butterfly, while "SB" corresponds to breaststroke and "SM" to the medley. Hence, a swimmer with severe physical disabilities competing in backstroke may compete in an S3 event, while a blind swimmer in the medley would compete in class SM11.

For relay races, athletes from different classifications compete together, but the sum of their individual classifications must not exceed a given points total. For example, a relay team for a 34 points freestyle relay may consist of two S8 swimmers and two S9 swimmers (9 + 9 + 8 + 8 = 34), or an S10 swimmer and three S8 swimmers (10 + 8 + 8 + 8 = 34)

== Para Swimming World Series ==
The World Series was launched in 2017.

1. 2017 World Para Swimming World Series - 5 Meetings
2. 2018 World Para Swimming World Series - 6 Meetings
3. World Para Swimming World Series 2019 - 7 Meetings
4. World Para Swimming World Series 2020 - 7 Meetings (5 of 7 was cancelled)
5. World Para Swimming - World Series 2021 - 4 Meetings
6. World Para Swimming - World Series 2022 - 6 Meetings
7. World Para Swimming - World Series 2023 - 8 Meetings

=== 2017 ===
2017 World Para Swimming World Series

City, country Name Date

1. Copenhagen, Denmark Copenhagen 2017 World Para Swimming World Series 11–12 March
2. São Paulo, Brazil São Paulo 2017 World Para Swimming World Series - Loterias Caixa Swimming Open Championships 21–23 April
3. Sheffield, Great Britain Sheffield 2017 World Para Swimming World Series - British Para Swimming International Meet 27–30 April
4. Indianapolis, USA Indianapolis 2017 World Para Swimming World Series 9–11 June
5. Berlin, Germany Berlin 2017 World Para Swimming World Series - Internationale Deutsche Meisterschaften Swimming Berlin 6–9 July

=== 2018 ===
2018 World Para Swimming World Series

City, country Name Date

1. Copenhagen, Denmark 2018 World Para Swimming World Series 2–4 March
2. Indianapolis, USA 2018 World Para Swimming World Series 19–21 April
3. São Paulo, Brazil 2018 World Para Swimming World Series Loterias Caixa Swimming Open Championships 26–28 April
4. Lignano Sabbiadoro, Italy 2018 World Para Swimming World Series 24-27 May
5. Sheffield, Great Britain 2018 World Para Swimming World Series British Para Swimming International Meet 31 May – 3 June
6. Berlin, Germany 2018 World Para Swimming World Series Internationale Deutsche Meisterschaften Swimming Berlin 7–10 June

=== 2019 ===
2019 World Para Swimming World Series

City, country Name Date

1. Melbourne, Australia – 15–17 February 2019
2. Indianapolis, USA – 4–6 April 2019
3. São Paulo, Brazil – 26–28 April 2019
4. Glasgow, Great Britain – 25–28 April 2019
5. Singapore – 10–12 May 2019
6. Lignano Sabbiadoro, Italy – 30 May-2 June 2019
7. Berlin, Germany – 6–9 June 2019

=== 2020 ===
2020 World Para Swimming World Series

City, country Name Date

1. Melbourne, Australia 14–16 February 2020
2. Lignano Sabbiadoro, Italy 27 February -1 March 2020 (CANCELLED)
3. São Paulo, Brazil 25–28 March 2020 (CANCELLED)
4. Sheffield, Great Britain 9–12 April 2020 (CANCELLED)
5. Indianapolis, USA 16–18 April 2020 (CANCELLED)
6. Singapore, 1–3 May 2020 (CANCELLED)
7. Berlin, Germany 2020 15–18 October 2020 (new dates)

=== 2021 ===
2021 World Para Swimming World Series

City, country Name Date

1. Sheffield 2021 World Series, Great Britain; 8–11 April
2. Lewisville 2021 World Series, USA; 15–17 April
3. Lignano Sabbiadoro 2021 World Series, Italy; 17–18 April
4. Berlin 2021 World Series, Germany; 17–20 June

=== 2022 ===
2022 World Para Swimming World Series

City, country Name Date

1. Para Swimming World Series Great Britain 17–20 February Aberdeen
2. Para Swimming World Series Australia 18–20 February Melbourne
3. Para Swimming World Series Italy 11–13 March Lignano Sabbiadoro
4. Para Swimming World Series Germany 31 March – 3 April Berlin
5. Para Swimming World Series USA 7–9 April Indianapolis

=== 2023 ===
1. Citi Para Swimming World Series Australia 17–19 February
2. Citi Para Swimming World Series Lignano Sabbiadoro 9–12 March
3. Citi Para Swimming World Series Great Britain 16–19 March
4. Citi Para Swimming World Series USA 20–22 April
5. Citi Para Swimming World Series Singapore 29 April-1 May
6. Citi Para Swimming World Series Berlin 11–14 May
7. Citi Para Swimming World Series France 26-28 Ma
8. Citi Para Swimming World Series Mexico 5–8 October

== Notable Para swimmers ==
- Ellie Cole
- Daniel Dias
- Jessica Long
- Ellie Simmonds
- Trischa Zorn
- Brad Snyder
- Zheng Tao

== See also ==
- List of Swimming World Swimmers of the Year#World Disabled Swimmers of the Year
- Category:World record holders in paralympic swimming
- Disability sport classification
- Swimming at the Summer Paralympics
