= Swimming at the 2024 Summer Paralympics – Men's 50 metre freestyle S4 =

Men's 50 metre freestyle S4 at the XVII Paralympic Games
- Venue: Paris La Défense Arena
- Dates: 6 September 2024
- Competitors: 12 from 9 nations
- Winning time: 35.61 WR

Medalists
1st place, gold medalist(s)		Sebastian Massabie	Canada
2nd place, silver medalist(s)		Takayuki Suzuki	Japan
3rd place, bronze medalist(s)		Ami Omer Dadaon	Israel

The men's 50 metre freestyle S4 event at the 2024 Paralympic Games took place on 6 September 2024, at the Paris La Défense Arena.

== Heats ==
The swimmers with the top eight times, regardless of heat, advanced to the final.

Rank	Heat	Lane	Name	Nationality	Time	Notes
1	1	5	Sebastian Massabie	Canada	36.95	Q, PR, AM
2	2	5	Takayuki Suzuki	Japan	37.49	Q
3	2	4	Ami Omer Dadaon	Israel	37.61	Q
4	1	4	Cameron Leslie	New Zealand	37.70	Q
5	2	3	Ángel de Jesús Camacho Ramírez	Mexico	38.36	Q
6	2	6	Luigi Beggiato	Italy	39.50	Q
7	1	6	Federico Cristiani	Italy	40.44	Q
8	1	3	Ariel Malyar	Israel	40.61	Q
9	1	7	Dimitri Granjux	France	41.89	
10	1	2	Andreas Ernhofer	Austria	42.44	
11	2	7	David Smétanine	France	42.97	
12	2	2	Roman Zhdanov	Neutral Paralympic Athletes	47.92	

== Final ==
Rank	Lane	Name	Nationality	Time	Notes
1st place, gold medalist(s)	4	Sebastian Massabie	Canada	35.61	WR
2nd place, silver medalist(s)	5	Takayuki Suzuki	Japan	36.85	AS
3rd place, bronze medalist(s)	3	Ami Omer Dadaon	Israel	37.11	
4	6	Cameron Leslie	New Zealand	37.24	
5	2	Ángel de Jesús Camacho Ramírez	Mexico	38.42	
6	7	Luigi Beggiato	Italy	40.03	
7	8	Ariel Malyar	Israel	40.53	
8	1	Federico Cristiani	Italy	40.72	
