= Swimming at the 2024 Summer Paralympics – Men's 200 metre freestyle S4 =

Men's 200 metre freestyle S4 at the XVII Paralympic Games
- Venue: La Défense Arena
- Date: 3 September 2024
- Competitors: 13 from 9 nations
- Winning time: 2:49.26

Medalists
1st place, gold medalist(s)		Ami Omer Dadaon	Israel
2nd place, silver medalist(s)		Roman Zhdanov	Neutral Paralympic Athletes
3rd place, bronze medalist(s)		Takayuki Suzuki	Japan

The men's 200 metre freestyle swimming (S4) event at the 2024 Summer Paralympics took place on 3 September 2024, at the La Défense Arena in Paris.

== Records ==
Prior to the competition, the existing world and Paralympic records were as follows.

World Record	Ami Omer Dadaon (ISR)	2:44.84	Tokyo, Japan	30 August 2021
Paralympic Record	Ami Omer Dadaon (ISR)	2:44.84	Tokyo, Japan	30 August 2021

== Results ==
=== Heats ===
The heats were started at 09:55.

Rank	Heat	Lane	Name	Nationality	Time	Notes
1	2	4	Ami Omer Dadaon	Israel	2:52.30	Q
2	1	5	Ángel Camacho	Mexico	2:59.17	Q
3	1	4	Federico Cristiani	Italy	2:59.47	Q
4	1	3	Sebastian Massabie	Canada	3:02.28	Q
5	1	6	Luigi Beggiato	Italy	3:02.88	Q
6	2	5	Roman Zhdanov	Neutral Paralympic Athletes	3:04.80	Q
7	2	3	Takayuki Suzuki	Japan	3:05.23	Q
8	2	6	Cameron Leslie	New Zealand	3:06.18	Q
9	2	2	Gustavo Sánchez	Mexico	3:12.34	
10	1	2	David Smétanine	France	3:15.32	
11	2	7	Dimitri Granjux	France	3:16.17	
12	1	7	Andreas Ernhofer	Austria	3:30.89	
13	2	1	Ariel Malyar	Israel	3:36.70	

=== Final ===
The final was held at 17:51.

Rank	Lane	Name	Nationality	Time	Notes
1st place, gold medalist(s)	4	Ami Omer Dadaon	Israel	2:49.26	
2nd place, silver medalist(s)	7	Roman Zhdanov	Neutral Paralympic Athletes	2:53.01	
3rd place, bronze medalist(s)	1	Takayuki Suzuki	Japan	2:55.17	
4	5	Ángel Camacho	Mexico	2:55.20	AM
5	3	Federico Cristiani	Italy	2:56.85	
6	6	Sebastian Massabie	Canada	2:59.15	
7	2	Luigi Beggiato	Italy	3:00.90	
8	8	Cameron Leslie	New Zealand	3:06.84	
