= Mexico at the 2024 Summer Paralympics =

- Flag of Mexico
- IPC code: MEX
- NPC: Comité Paralímpico Mexicano
- Website: www.copame.org.mx (in Spanish)

in Paris, France August 28, 2024 – September 8, 2024
- Competitors: 67 in 11 sports
- Flag bearer (opening): Salvador Hernández / Fabiola Ramírez
- Flag bearer (closing): Perla Bárcenas
- Medals Ranked 30th: Gold 3 Silver 6 Bronze 8 Total 17

Summer Paralympics appearances (overview)
- 1972; 1976; 1980; 1984; 1988; 1992; 1996; 2000; 2004; 2008; 2012; 2016; 2020; 2024

Mexico participated at the 2024 Summer Paralympics in Paris, France, from 28 August to 8 September, 2024. It was the nation's fourteenth appearance at the Summer Paralympics.

== Medalists ==
Medal	Name	Sport	Event	Date
Gold	Gloria Zarza	Athletics	Women's shot put F54	2 September
Gold	Arnulfo Castorena	Swimming	Men's 50m breaststroke SB2	4 September
Gold	Juan Pablo Cervantes	Athletics	Men's 100m T54	4 September
Silver	Haideé Aceves	Swimming	Women's 100m backstroke S2	29 August
Silver	Haideé Aceves	Swimming	Women's 50m backstroke S2	31 August
Silver	Luis Mario Nájera	Taekwondo	Men's -80 kg	31 August
Silver	Gilda Cota	Athletics	Women's shot put F33	5 September
Silver	Édgar Fuentes	Athletics	Men's javelin throw F54	6 September
Silver	Ángel de Jesús Camacho	Swimming	Men's 50m backstroke S4	7 September
Bronze	Rosa María Guerrero	Athletics	Women's discus throw F55	30 August
Bronze	Ángel de Jesús Camacho	Swimming	Men's 100m freestyle S4	30 August
Bronze	Juan Diego García	Taekwondo	Men's -70 kg	30 August
Bronze	Osiris Machado	Athletics	Women's discus throw F64	1 September
Bronze	Ángel de Jesús Camacho	Swimming	Men's 150m individual medley SM4	1 September
Bronze	Amalia Pérez	Powerlifting	Women's – 61 kg	6 September
Bronze	Jesús Alberto Gutiérrez	Swimming	Men's 400m freestyle S6	6 September
Bronze	José de Jesús Castillo	Powerlifting	Men's −107 kg	8 September

=== Medals by date ===
Medals by date
Day	Date	Gold medal	Silver medal	Bronze medal	Total
1	29 Aug	0	1	0	1
2	30 Aug	0	0	3	3
3	31 Aug	0	2	0	2
4	1 Sep	0	0	2	2
5	2 Sep	1	0	0	1
6	3 Sep	0	0	0	0
7	4 Sep	2	0	0	2
8	5 Sep	0	1	0	1
9	6 Sep	0	1	2	3
10	7 Sep	0	1	0	1
11	8 Sep	0	0	1	1
Total		3	6	8	17

=== Medals by sport ===
Medals by sport
	Sport	Gold medal	Silver medal	Bronze medal	Total
1	Athletics	2	2	2	6
2	Swimming	1	3	3	7
3	Taekwondo	0	1	1	2
4	Powerlifting	0	0	2	2
Total		3	6	8	17

== Competitors ==
The following is the list of number of competitors in the Games.

Sport	Men	Women	Total
Archery	2	0	2
Athletics	10	15	25
Boccia	1	0	1
Cycling	0	1	1
Equestrian	1	0	1
Powerlifting	1	2	3
Rowing	1	1	2
Swimming	12	11	23
Table tennis	0	2	2
Taekwondo	2	3	5
Triathlon	0	2	2
Total	30	37	67

== Archery ==
Mexico secured a quota places in men recurve and men compound event by virtue of their own result at the 2023 World Para Archery Championships in Plzeň, Czech Republic and 2023 Parapan American Games in Santiago, Chile.

Athlete	Event	Ranking Round		Round of 32	Round of 16	Quarterfinals	Semifinals	Finals	
Athlete	Event	Score	Seed	Opposition Score	Opposition Score	Opposition Score	Opposition Score	Opposition Score	Rank
Víctor Sardina Viveros	Men's individual compound	688 PB	14	Stutzman (USA); L 136-142	Did not advance				=17
Samuel Efrén Molina Núñez	Men's individual recurve	641	7	Hossain (BAN); W 7-1	Kenton-Smith (AUS); L 4-6	Did not advance			=9

== Athletics ==
Mexican track and field athletes achieved quota places for the following events based on their results at the 2023 World Championships, 2024 World Championships, or through high performance allocation, as long as they meet the minimum entry standard (MES).

Key

- Note: Ranks given for track events are within the athlete's heat only. If qualified to final, rank is the final overall position.
- Q = Qualified for the next round
- q = Qualified for the next round as a fastest loser or, in field events, by position without achieving the qualifying target
- DSQ = Disqualified
- PR = Paralympic Record
- AR = Area (or continental) Record
- NR = National Record
- PB = Personal Best
- SB = Season's Best
- - = Round not applicable for the event as there are not enough competitors to have qualifying heats or semifinal round
- NM = Did not mark a valid attempt
- Bye = Athlete not required to compete in round

Men's track

Athlete	Event	Round 1		Final	
Athlete	Event	Result	Rank	Result	Rank
Juan Pablo Cervantes	Men's 100m T54	13.84 SB	2 Q	13.74 AR	1st place, gold medalist(s)
Juan Pablo Cervantes	Men's 400m T54	47.30 SB	5 q	48.45	8
José Rodolfo Chessani	Men's 400m T38	—N/a		51.41	6
Salvador Hernández	Men's 100m T52	17.45 SB	3 Q	17.55	5
Salvador Hernández	Men's 400m T52	1:05.71	3 Q	1:04.32	7
Édgar Navarro	Men's 100m T51	—N/a		21.97	5
Édgar Navarro	Men's 200m T51	—N/a		42.92 SB	6
Leonardo Pérez	Men's 100m T52	17.57 SB	3 Q	17.67	6
Leonardo Pérez	Men's 400m T52	1:03.14	3 Q	1:03.43	4

Men's field

Athlete	Event	Final	
Athlete	Event	Result	Rank
Édgar Fuentes	Men's javelin throw F54	30.53 SB	2nd place, silver medalist(s)
Eliezer Gabriel	Men's javelin throw F46	61.65	4
Luis Carlos López	Men's shot put F37	14.31	5
Luis Carlos López	Men's discus throw F37	50.31 PB	6
Mario Ramos	Men's club throw F51	31.76	5
José Román Ruiz	Men's shot put F36	15.23	5

Women's track

Athlete	Event	Round 1		Semifinal		Final	
Athlete	Event	Result	Rank	Result	Rank	Result	Rank
Mónica Rodríguez Guide: Pablo Jaciel Rodríguez	Women's 1500m T11	5:00.23 SB	3	—N/a		Did not advance	8
Daniela Velasco Guide: César Daniel Belman	Women's 400m T12	1:04.88	3	Did not advance			11
Daniela Velasco Guide: César Daniel Belman	Women's 1500m T13	—N/a		—N/a		DSQ	

Women's field

Athlete	Event	Qualification		Final	
Athlete	Event	Result	Rank	Result	Rank
Rosa Carolina Castro	Women's discus throw F38	—N/a		34.50	5
Floralia Estrada	Women's discus throw F57	—N/a		29.82	7
Gilda Cota	Women's shot put F33	—N/a		7.89 AR	2nd place, silver medalist(s)
Rosa María Guerrero	Women's discus throw F55	—N/a		25.81	3rd place, bronze medalist(s)
Yessica de la Luz Jiménez	Women's javelin throw F56	—N/a		16.25	10
Kenya Nayeli Lozano	Women's javelin throw F46	—N/a		35.73 SB	10
Osiris Machado	Women's discus throw F64	—N/a		40.01	3rd place, bronze medalist(s)
Pauleth Mejía Hernández	Women's shot put F40	—N/a		8.06	6
María Guadalupe Navarro	Women's discus throw F55	—N/a		21.66	7
María Guadalupe Navarro	Women's javelin throw F56	17.10	1 q	17.36 PB	8
Leticia Ochoa Delgado	Women's discus throw F53	—N/a		10.92 SB	6
María de los Ángeles Ortiz	Women's shot put F57	—N/a		10.33	4
María Estela Salas	Women's discus throw F53	—N/a		10.02	8
Gloria Zarza	Women's shot put F54	—N/a		8.06	1st place, gold medalist(s)

== Boccia ==
Mexico entered one athletes, to compete in the BC1 event. Eduardo Sánchez Reyes qualified for the games after nominated as one of the two highest ranked individuals, not yet qualified, through the release of final world ranking for Paris 2024.

Key

- Note: An asterisk (*) means the match was decided after a tiebreak

Athlete	Event	Pool matches			Quarterfinals	Semifinals	Final / BM	
Athlete	Event	Opposition Score	Opposition Score	Rank	Opposition Score	Opposition Score	Opposition Score	Rank
Eduardo Sánchez Reyes	Men's individual BC1	Jung S-j (KOR); L 3–3*	Huadpradit (THA); L 3–4	3	Did not advance			9

== Cycling ==
Mexico entered one athlete to compete in Paris 2024.

Athlete	Event	Time	Rank
Dulce González Guerrero	Women's time trial T1-2	29:59.75	6
Dulce González Guerrero	Women's road race T1-2	1:12:12	6

== Equestrian ==
One spot has been awarded to Mexico by the International Equestrian Federation.

Individual

Athlete	Horse	Event	Total	
Athlete	Horse	Event	Score	Rank
Ignacio Treviño Fuerte	Kukul LS La Silla	Individual championship test grade III	61.267	13
Ignacio Treviño Fuerte	Kukul LS La Silla	Individual freestyle test grade III	Did not advance	

== Powerlifting ==
Mexico sent three athletes in Powerlifting as they are in top ranked eight powerlifters in their respective bodyweight category.

Athlete	Event	Total lifted	Rank
Perla Bárcenas	Women's + 86 kg	130	7
José de Jesús Castillo	Men's −107 kg	222	3rd place, bronze medalist(s)
Amalia Pérez	Women's – 61 kg	130	3rd place, bronze medalist(s)

== Rowing ==
Mexico qualified one boats in mixed double sculls classes, by winning the 2023 Pan American Continental Qualification Regatta in Rio de Janeiro, Brazil.

Athlete	Event	Heats		Repechage		Final	
Athlete	Event	Time	Rank	Time	Rank	Time	Rank
Ángeles Britani Gutiérrez Vieyra; Miguel Ángel Nieto Carpio	PR3 mixed double sculls	8:19.70	4 R	8:10.54	4 FB	8:28.23	9

Qualification Legend: Rank indicates position in their own heat, except for the final. FA=Final A (medal); FB=Final B (non-medal); R=Repechage

== Swimming ==
Mexico secured five quotas at the 2023 World Para Swimming Championships after finishing in the top two places in Paralympic class disciplines.

Key

- Note: Ranks given are overall position for each round as there are not enough competitors to have more than 2-3 heats
- Q = Qualified for the next round based on overall position after heats
- DSQ = Disqualified
- DNS = Did not start
- PR = Paralympic Record
- AR = Area (or continental) Record
- NR = National Record
- SB = Season's Best
- N/A = Round not applicable for the event as there are not enough competitors to have qualifying heats

Men

Athlete	Event	Heats		Final	
Athlete	Event	Time	Rank	Time	Rank
Ángel de Jesús Camacho	Men's 50m freestyle S4	38.36	5 Q	38.42	5
Ángel de Jesús Camacho	Men's 100m freestyle S4	1:23.58	3 Q	1:22.32 AR	3rd place, bronze medalist(s)
Ángel de Jesús Camacho	Men's 200m freestyle S4	2:59.17	2 Q	2:55.20 AR	4
Ángel de Jesús Camacho	Men's 50m backstroke S4	43.08	3 Q	42.70	2nd place, silver medalist(s)
Ángel de Jesús Camacho	Men's 150m individual medley SM4	2:40.40	3 Q	2:37.29 AR	3rd place, bronze medalist(s)
Arnulfo Castorena	Men's 50m breaststroke SB2	57.82	1 Q	59.41	1st place, gold medalist(s)
Arnulfo Castorena	Men's 150m individual medley SM3	3:17.62	6 Q	3:15.47	5
Jesús Alberto Gutiérrez	Men's 200m individual medley SM6	2:48.10	5 Q	2:45.21	=5
Jesús Alberto Gutiérrez	Men's 50m butterfly S6	34.22	7 Q	35.99	8
Jesús Alberto Gutiérrez	Men's 100m freestyle S6	1:15.68	12	Did not advance	
Jesús Alberto Gutiérrez	Men's 400m freestyle S6	5:14.34	3 Q	5:07.00	3rd place, bronze medalist(s)
Jesús Alberto Gutiérrez	Men's 100m backstroke S6	1:25.47	10	Did not advance	
Juan José Gutiérrez	Men's 400m freestyle S6	5:31.98	9	Did not advance	
Juan José Gutiérrez	Men's 50m butterfly S6	35.36	10	Did not advance	
Juan José Gutiérrez	Men's 100m breaststroke SB6	1:28.49	10	Did not advance	
Juan José Gutiérrez	Men's 200m individual medley SM6	DSQ		Did not advance	
Raúl Gutiérrez	Men's 400m freestyle S6	5:22.81	6 Q	5:22.41	6
Raúl Gutiérrez	Men's 200m individual medley SM6	2:50.66	8 Q	2:52.83	8
Jesús Hernández	Men's 50m backstroke S4	46.38	7 Q	47.10	8
Diego López	Men's 50m freestyle S3	47.61	4 Q	46.59	6
Diego López	Men's 200m freestyle S3	3:34.96	4 Q	3:33.45	4
Diego López	Men's 50m backstroke S3	50.64	4 Q	52.77	5
Diego López	Men's 150m individual medley SM3	3:32.29	10	Did not advance	
Jesús López	Men's 50m backstroke S2	1:10.51	8 Q	1:08.56	8
Jesús López	Men's 100m backstroke S2	2:22.50	8 Q	2:25.64	8
Jesús López	Men's 200m freestyle S2	5:02.82	10	Did not advance	
Pedro Rangel	Men's 100m breaststroke SB5	1:41.00	9	Did not advance	
Gustavo Sánchez	Men's 100m freestyle S4	1:31.13	11	Did not advance	
Gustavo Sánchez	Men's 200m freestyle S4	3:12.34	9	Did not advance	
Gustavo Sánchez	Men's 50m breaststroke SB3	N/A		1:00.28	7
Gustavo Sánchez	Men's 150m individual medley SM4	2:45.82	5 Q	DSQ	
Cristopher Tronco	Men's 200m freestyle S2	5:00.24	9	Did not advance	
Cristopher Tronco	Men's 50m backstroke S2	1:03.00	5 Q	1:04.15	5
Cristopher Tronco	Men's 100m backstroke S2	2:18.75	6 Q	2:14.87	5
Cristopher Tronco	Men's 50m breaststroke SB2	1:07.33	5 Q	1:05.26	4
Marcos Zárate	Men's 150m individual medley SM3	3:20.28	7 Q	3:19.31	7
Marcos Zárate	Men's 50m breaststroke SB2	1:09.97	6 Q	1:10.73	6
Marcos Zárate	Men's 50m backstroke S3	59.02	9	Did not advance	
Marcos Zárate	Men's 50m freestyle S3	51.33	8 Q	52.36	8
Marcos Zárate	Men's 200m freestyle S3	4:03.16	10	Did not advance	

Women

Athlete	Event	Heats		Final	
Athlete	Event	Time	Rank	Time	Rank
Haideé Aceves	Women's 50m backstroke S2	1:08.75 AR	2 Q	1:08.96	2nd place, silver medalist(s)
Haideé Aceves	Women's 100m backstroke S2	2:22.03	2 Q	2:21.79	2nd place, silver medalist(s)
Haideé Aceves	Women's 100m freestyle S3	2:31.37 AR	11	Did not advance	
Matilde Alcázar	Women's 50m freestyle S11	34.62	14	Did not advance	
Matilde Alcázar	Women's 100m freestyle S11	1:14.52	13	Did not advance	
Matilde Alcázar	Women's 100m backstroke S11	1:28.58	12	Did not advance	
Matilde Alcázar	Women's 400m freestyle S11	5:40.23	7 Q	5:34.54	7
Matilde Alcázar	Women's 200m individual medley SM11	3:06.93	8 Q	3:05.45	8
Natalia González	Women's 100m breaststroke SB7	DSQ		Did not advance	
Amayrani Hernández	Women's 200m freestyle S5	4:07.22	20	Did not advance	
Amayrani Hernández	Women's 50m backstroke S5	50.58	13	Did not advance	
Nely Miranda	Women's 50m freestyle S4	43.59	8 Q	42.07	5
Nely Miranda	Women's 50m backstroke S4	N/A		55.73	6
Nely Miranda	Women's 50m breaststroke SB3	1:04.55	6 Q	1:04.43	7
Nely Miranda	Women's 150m individual medley SM4	3:08.22	8 Q	3:03.49	6
Naomi Ortiz	Women's 100m freestyle S7	1:17.69	15	Did not advance	
Naomi Ortiz	Women's 400m freestyle S7	5:36.91	8 Q	5:36.59	8
Naomi Ortiz	Women's 50m butterfly S7	40.11	14	Did not advance	
Fabiola Ramírez	Women's 50m backstroke S2	1:12.56	5 Q	1:12.30	6
Fabiola Ramírez	Women's 100m backstroke S2	2:32.79	5 Q	2:40.28	6
Paola Ruvalcaba	Women's 100m backstroke S8	1:23.91	11	Did not advance	
Paola Ruvalcaba	Women's 400m freestyle S8	5:22.63	10	Did not advance	
Citli Salinas	Women's 100m breaststroke SB14	1:26.40	12	Did not advance	
Citli Salinas	Women's 200m individual medley SM14	2:44.88	14	Did not advance	
Citli Salinas	Women's 100m backstroke S14	1:13.17	12	Did not advance	
Naomi Somellera	Women's 50m butterfly S7	39.37	11	Did not advance	
Naomi Somellera	Women's 100m breaststroke SB7	1:40.47	5 Q	1:39.99	5
Naomi Somellera	Women's 400m freestyle S7	6:00.25	11	Did not advance	
Naomi Somellera	Women's 200m individual medley SM7	3:11.93	9	Did not advance	
Patricia Valle	Women's 50m backstroke S3	1:14.55	10	Did not advance	
Patricia Valle	Women's 100m freestyle S3	2:10.36	7 Q	2:12.65	8
Patricia Valle	Women's 50m breaststroke SB3	1:07.52	8 Q	1:07.03	8

Mixed Relays

Athlete	Event	Heats		Final	
Athlete	Event	Time	Rank	Time	Rank
Naomi Somellera; Raúl Gutiérrez; Nely Miranda; Diego López Díaz	4 x 50m freestyle relay - 20 pts	2:40.49	7 Q	DSQ	
Paola Ruvalcaba; Cristopher Tronco; Patricia Valle; Raúl Gutiérrez	4 x 50m medley relay - 20 pts	DNS		Did not advance	

== Table tennis ==
Mexico secure two single spot for the Paralympic games. Claudia Pérez qualified for Paris 2024 by virtue of his gold medal results, in women's class 7, through the 2023 Parapan American Games in Santiago, Chile; meanwhile Martha Verdín qualified for the games through the allocations of ITTF final world ranking.

Athlete	Event	Round of 16	Quarterfinals	Semifinals	Final / BM	
Athlete	Event	Opposition Result	Opposition Result	Opposition Result	Opposition Result	Rank
Martha Verdín	Women's individual C4	Patel (IND); L (3-11, 6-11, 7-11)	Did not advance			=9
Claudia Pérez	Women's individual C7	Bye	Korkut (TUR); L (6-11, 13-11, 10-12, 11-9, 7-11)	Did not advance		=5

== Taekwondo ==
Mexico entered five athletes to compete at the Paralympics competition. All of them qualified for Paris 2024, by virtue of finishing within the top six in the Paralympic rankings in their respective class.

Men

Athlete	Event	Round of 32	Round of 16	Quarterfinals	Semifinals	Repechage	Final / BM	
Athlete	Event	Opposition Result	Opposition Result	Opposition Result	Opposition Result	Opposition Result	Opposition Result	Rank
Juan Diego García López	–70 kg	—N/a	Loi (PNG); W 19-0	Alikulov (UZB); L 4-5	—N/a	Suárez (CUB); W 17-10	Kudo (JPN); W 5-3	3rd place, bronze medalist(s)
Luis Mario Nájera	–80 kg	Bye	Bye	Abuzarli (AZE); W 6-3	Joo (KOR); W 10-8	—N/a	Toshtemirov (UZB); L 17-38	2nd place, silver medalist(s)

Women

Athlete	Event	Round of 32	Round of 16	Quarterfinals	Semifinals	Repechage	Final / BM	
Athlete	Event	Opposition Result	Opposition Result	Opposition Result	Opposition Result	Opposition Result	Opposition Result	Rank
Claudia Romero	–47 kg	—N/a	Bye	Laarif (MAR); L DQB	Did not advance			
Jessica García Quijano	–52 kg	—N/a	Bye	Krassavtseva (KAZ); W 10-8	Ulambayar (MGL); L 5-13	—N/a	Çavdar (TUR); L 3-6	=5
Fernanda Vargas	+65 kg	Bye	Bye	Rašić (SRB); W 4-1	Truesdale (GBR); L 13-26	—N/a	Papastamatopoulou (GRE); L 9-36	=5

== Triathlon ==
Mexico qualified two female athletes to compete at the Paralympics competition.

Athlete	Event	Swim	Trans 1	Bike	Trans 2	Run	Total Time	Rank
Brenda Osnaya	Women's PTWC	DSQ						
Kenia Villalobos	Women's PTS4	13:59	1:15	40:55	0:44	26:00	1:22:53	11

== See also ==
- Mexico at the 2024 Summer Olympics
- Mexico at the Paralympics
