= Swimming at the 2024 Summer Paralympics – Men's 50 metre backstroke S4 =

Men's 50 metre backstroke S4 at the XVII Paralympic Games
- Venue: La Défense Arena
- Date: 7 September 2024
- Competitors: 14 from 13 nations
- Winning time: 42.30

Medalists
1st place, gold medalist(s)		Roman Zhdanov	Neutral Paralympic Athletes
2nd place, silver medalist(s)		Ángel Camacho	Mexico
3rd place, bronze medalist(s)		Arnošt Petráček	Czech Republic

The men's 50 metre backstroke swimming (S4) event at the 2024 Summer Paralympics took place on 7 September 2024, at the La Défense Arena in Paris.

== Records ==
Prior to the competition, the existing world and Paralympic records were as follows.

World Record	Roman Zhdanov (RPC)	40.99	Tokyo, Japan	3 September 2021
Paralympic Record	Roman Zhdanov (RPC)	40.99	Tokyo, Japan	3 September 2021

== Results ==
=== Heats ===
The heats were started at 10:38.

Rank	Heat	Lane	Name	Nationality	Time	Notes
1	2	4	Roman Zhdanov	Neutral Paralympic Athletes	42.90	Q
2	2	5	Cameron Leslie	New Zealand	43.05	Q
3	1	4	Ángel Camacho	Mexico	43.08	Q
4	1	5	Arnošt Petráček	Czech Republic	43.81	Q
5	1	3	Zou Liankang	China	45.20	Q
6	2	3	Matz Topkin	Estonia	46.24	Q
7	2	6	Jesús Hernández	Mexico	46.38	Q
8	1	6	Dmytro Vynohradets	Ukraine	46.57	Q
9	1	2	Dimitri Granjux	France	46.99	
10	2	2	Andreas Ernhofer	Austria	48.35	
11	1	7	Miguel Luque	Spain	50.42	
12	2	1	Ariel Malyar	Israel	53.97	
13	1	1	Federico Cristiani	Italy	54.60	
14	2	7	Jo Gi-seong	South Korea	54.75	

=== Final ===
The final was held at 18:58.

Rank	Lane	Name	Nationality	Time	Notes
1st place, gold medalist(s)	4	Roman Zhdanov	Neutral Paralympic Athletes	42.30	
2nd place, silver medalist(s)	3	Ángel Camacho	Mexico	42.70	
3rd place, bronze medalist(s)	6	Arnošt Petráček	Czech Republic	43.96	
4	5	Cameron Leslie	New Zealand	44.20	
5	2	Zou Liankang	China	45.44	
6	8	Dmytro Vynohradets	Ukraine	46.32	
7	7	Matz Topkin	Estonia	47.03	
8	1	Jesús Hernández	Mexico	47.10	
