= 2025 World Para Swimming Championships – Men's 150 metre individual medley =

The men's 150 metre individual medley events at the 2025 World Para Swimming Championships will be held at the Singapore Aquatic Centre between 21 and 27 September 2025. Two events, covering three classifications, shall take place.

== Schedule ==
The 150 metre individual medley events for men will be held across the following schedule:

men's 150 metre individual medley
Day	Date	Classifications
Day 1	21 Sept	
Day 2	22 Sept	SM3
Day 3	23 Sept	SM4
Day 4	24 Spt	
Day 5	25 Sept	
Day 6	26 Sept	
Day 7	27 Sept	

== Medal summary ==
Event	Gold	Silver	Bronze
SM3	Josia Topf; Germany	Ahmed Kelly; Australia	Gabriele Lorenzo; Italy
SM4	Roman Zhdanov; Individual Neutral Athletes	Ami Omer Dadaon; Israel	Ángel de Jesús Camacho Ramírez; Mexico

== Race summaries ==
=== SM3 ===
The men's 150 metre individual medley SM3 event will be held on the morning and evening of 22 September. The event is open to SM2 swimmers.

The relevant records in the lead up to this event where as follows:

Record	Athlete	Time	Date	City	Country
World	Huang Wenpan (CHN)	2:40.19	2016-09-16	Rio de Janeiro	Brazil
Championship	Huang Wenpan (CHN)	2:51.50	2017-12-07	Mexico City	Mexico
African	Youssef Elsayed (EGY)	3:56.83	2023-11-10	Cairo	Egypt
Americas	Diego Lopez Diaz (MEX)	2:55.20	2019-04-06	Indianapolis	United States
Asian	Huang Wenpan (CHN)	2:40.19	2016-09-16	Rio de Janeiro	Brazil
European	Dmytro Vynohradets' (UKR)	2:40.75	2016-09-16	Rio de Janeiro	Brazil
Oceania	Ahmed Kelly (AUS)	2:58.59	2023-08-01	Manchester	United Kingdom

==== Heats ====
Thirteen swimmers will take part, with the top eight progressing to the final.

Rank	Heat	Lane	Athlete	Class	Result	Notes
1	1	4	Ahmed Kelly (AUS)	SM3	3:10.56	Q
2	2	5	Grant Patterson (AUS)	SM3	3:11.46	Q
3	2	2	Gabriele Lorenzo (ITA)	SM3	3:14.35	Q
4	2	4	Josia Topf (GER)	SM3	3:15.73	Q
5	1	5	Umut Unlu (TUR)	SM3	3:19.67	Q
6	1	2	Ismail Barlov (BIH)	SM3	3:23.99	Q
7	2	6	Marcos Zárate (MEX)	SM3	3:24.33	Q
8	1	3	Gabriel Araújo (BRA)	SM2	3:27.57	Q, CR
9	1	6	Emmanuele Marigliano (ITA)	SM3	3:28.54	
10	1	7	Charkorn Kaewsri (THA)	SM3	4:03.03	
11	2	7	Ioannis Kostakis (GRE)	SM3	4:24.00	
	2	1	Iyad Shalabi (ISR)	SM1		DNS

==== Final ====
Rank	Lane	Athlete	Class	Result	Notes
1st place, gold medalist(s)	6	Josia Topf (GER)	SM3	2:55.06	
2nd place, silver medalist(s)	4	Ahmed Kelly (AUS)	SM3	3:04.29	
3rd place, bronze medalist(s)	3	Gabriele Lorenzo (ITA)	SM3	3:09.05	
4	5	Grant Patterson (AUS)	SM3	3:09.92	
5	8	Gabriel Araújo (BRA)	SM2	3:16.26	
6	2	Umut Unlu (TUR)	SM3	3:16.79	
7	1	Marcos Zárate (MEX)	SM3	3:21.98	
8	7	Ismail Barlov (BIH)	SM3	3:22.36	

=== SM4 ===
The men's 150 metre individual medley SM4 event was held on 23 September. Twelve swimmers will take part, with the top eight progressing to the final.

The relevant records in the lead up to this event where as follows:

Record	Athlete	Time	Date	City	Country
World	Roman Zhdanov (IPC)	2:21.17	2021-08-28	Tokyo	Japan
Championship	Roman Zhdanov (RUS)	2:26.27	2019-09-11	London	United Kingdom
African	Quinton Harris (RSA)	4:30.72	2015-09-30	Sochi	Russia
Americas	Ángel Camacho (MEX)	2:37.29	2024-09-01	Paris	France
Asian	Jin Zhipeng (CHN)	2:26.91	2016-09-12	Rio de Janeiro	Brazil
European	Roman Zhdanov (IPC)	2:21.17	2021-08-28	Tokyo	Japan
Oceania	Cameron Leslie (NZL)	2:23.12	2016-09-12	Rio de Janeiro	Brazil

==== Heats ====
Ten swimmers took part, with the top eight progressing to the final.

Rank	Heat	Lane	Athlete	Class	Result	Notes
1	1	5	Ami Omer Dadaon (ISR)	SM4	2:30.52	Q
2	1	4	Roman Zhdanov (AIN)	SM4	2:32.42	Q
3	1	3	Giseong Jo (KOR)	SM4	2:43.53	Q
4	1	6	Ángel Camacho (MEX)	SM4	2:45.34	Q
5	1	2	Andreas Ernhofer (AUT)	SM4	2:47.63	Q
6	1	1	Dimitri Granjux (FRA)	SM4	2:51.74	Q
7	1	0	Federico Cristiani (ITA)	SM4	2:52.26	Q
8	1	8	Miguel Luque (ESP)	SM4	2:58.20	Q
9	1	9	Nattawut Kongsripilarom (THA)	SM4	3:47.46	
	1	7	Gustavo Sánchez Martínez (MEX)	SM4		DSQ

==== Final ====
Rank	Lane	Athlete	Class	Result	Notes
1st place, gold medalist(s)	5	Roman Zhdanov (AIN)	SM4	2:20.86	WR
2nd place, silver medalist(s)	4	Ami Omer Dadaon (ISR)	SM4	2:28.90	
3rd place, bronze medalist(s)	6	Ángel Camacho (MEX)	SM4	2:37.65	
4	3	Giseong Jo (KOR)	SM4	2:40.76	
5	7	Dimitri Granjux (FRA)	SM4	2:43.95	
6	2	Andreas Ernhofer (AUT)	SM4	2:47.79	
7	1	Federico Cristiani (ITA)	SM4	2:49.34	
8	8	Miguel Luque (ESP)	SM4	2:59.22	
