= Swimming at the 2024 Summer Paralympics – Men's 100 metre freestyle S4 =

Men's 100 metre freestyle S4 at the XVII Paralympic Games
- Venue: Paris La Défense Arena
- Dates: 30 August 2024
- Competitors: 12 from 8 nations
- Winning time: 1:20.25

Medalists
1st place, gold medalist(s)		Ami Omer Dadaon	Israel
2nd place, silver medalist(s)		Takayuki Suzuki	Japan
3rd place, bronze medalist(s)		Ángel de Jesús Camacho Ramírez	Mexico

The men's 100 metre freestyle S4 event at the 2024 Paralympic Games took place on 30 August 2024, at the Paris La Défense Arena.

== Heats ==
The swimmers with the top eight times, regardless of heat, advanced to the final.

Rank	Heat	Lane	Name	Nationality	Time	Notes
1	2	4	Ami Omer Dadaon	Israel	1:19.33	Q, PR
2	1	5	Takayuki Suzuki	Japan	1:22.80	Q
3	2	5	Ángel de Jesús Camacho Ramírez	Mexico	1:23.58	Q
4	1	6	Sebastian Massabie	Canada	1:23.80	Q
5	2	3	Luigi Beggiato	Italy	1:24.11	Q
6	1	4	Cameron Leslie	New Zealand	1:24.22	Q
7	1	3	Federico Cristiani	Italy	1:25.11	Q
8	2	6	Roman Zhdanov	Neutral Paralympic Athletes	1:26.42	Q
9	2	1	Dimitri Granjux	France	1:29.09	
10	1	2	David Smétanine	France	1:30.36	
11	2	2	Gustavo Sánchez Martínez	Mexico	1:31.13	
12	1	7	Ariel Malyar	Israel	1:39.35	

== Final ==
Rank	Lane	Name	Nationality	Time	Notes
1st place, gold medalist(s)	4	Ami Omer Dadaon	Israel	1:20.25	
2nd place, silver medalist(s)	5	Takayuki Suzuki	Japan	1:21.71	
3rd place, bronze medalist(s)	3	Ángel de Jesús Camacho Ramírez	Mexico	1:22.32	AM
4	1	Federico Cristiani	Italy	1:22.33	
5	6	Sebastian Massabie	Canada	1:22.53	
6	8	Roman Zhdanov	Neutral Paralympic Athletes	1:22.96	
7	7	Cameron Leslie	New Zealand	1:24.03	
8	2	Luigi Beggiato	Italy	1:24.38	
