= 2020 World Para Swimming European Open Championships – Men's 50 metre breaststroke =

The men's 50m breaststroke events at the 2020 World Para Swimming European Championships were held at the Penteada Olympic Pools Complex.

== Medalists ==
Event	Gold	Silver	Bronze
SB2	Emmanuele Marigliano; Italy	Ioannis Kostakis; Greece	Aliaksei Talai; Belarus
SB3	Roman Zhdanov; Russia	Efrem Morelli; Italy	Andreas Ernhofer; Austria

== Results ==
=== SB2 ===
Final

Rank	Name	Nationality	Time	Notes
1st place, gold medalist(s)	Emmanuele Marigliano	Italy	1:06.46	
2nd place, silver medalist(s)	Ioannis Kostakis	Greece	1:07.94	
3rd place, bronze medalist(s)	Aliaksei Talai	Belarus	1:20.13	
4	William Frison	Italy	1:34.89	

=== SB3 ===
Heat 1

Rank	Name	Nationality	Time	Notes
1	Efrem Morelli	Italy	51.03	Q
2	Roman Zhdanov	Russia	52.03	Q
3	Andreas Ernhofer	Austria	54.01	Q
4	Ami Omer Dadaon	Israel	55.80	Q
5	Manuel Martinez Martinez	Spain	58.64	Q
6	Francisco Salinas Martinez	Spain	1:01.06	Q
7	Xavier Torres	Spain	1:01.33	Q
8	Ivan Fernandez	Spain	1:03.24	
9	Ariel Malyar	Israel	1:15.25	

Final

Rank	Name	Nationality	Time	Notes
1st place, gold medalist(s)	Roman Zhdanov	Russia	48.40	
2nd place, silver medalist(s)	Efrem Morelli	Italy	49.47	
3rd place, bronze medalist(s)	Andreas Ernhofer	Austria	53.81	
4	Ami Omer Dadaon	Israel	55.00	
5	Manuel Martinez Martinez	Spain	57.79	
6	Francisco Salinas Martinez	Spain	1:00.47	
7	Ivan Fernandez	Spain	1:03.71	
—	Xavier Torres	Spain	DNS	
