= Swimming at the 2024 Summer Paralympics – Men's 150 metre individual medley SM4 =

Men's 150 metre individual medley SM4 at the XVII Paralympic Games
- Venue: La Défense Arena
- Date: 1 September 2024
- Competitors: 8 from 7 nations
- Winning time: 2:23.03

Medalists
1st place, gold medalist(s)		Roman Zhdanov	Neutral Paralympic Athletes
2nd place, silver medalist(s)		Ami Omer Dadaon	Israel
3rd place, bronze medalist(s)		Ángel Camacho	Mexico

The men's 150 metre individual medley swimming (SM4) event at the 2024 Summer Paralympics took place on 1 September 2024, at the La Défense Arena in Paris.

== Records ==
Prior to the competition, the existing world and Paralympic records were as follows.

World Record	Roman Zhdanov (RPC)	2:21.17	Tokyo, Japan	28 August 2021
Paralympic Record	Roman Zhdanov (RPC)	2:21.17	Tokyo, Japan	28 August 2021

== Results ==
=== Heats ===
The heats were started at 10:35.

Rank	Heat	Lane	Name	Nationality	Time	Notes
1	2	4	Roman Zhdanov	Neutral Paralympic Athletes	2:31.43	Q
2	1	4	Ami Omer Dadaon	Israel	2:34.71	Q
3	1	5	Ángel Camacho	Mexico	2:40.40	Q
4	2	5	Jo Gi-seong	South Korea	2:41.11	Q
5	1	3	Gustavo Sánchez	Mexico	2:45.82	Q
6	1	6	Dimitri Granjux	France	2:50.32	Q
7	2	6	Miguel Luque	Spain	2:54.13	Q
8	2	3	Efrem Morelli	Italy	2:55.11	Q

=== Final ===
The final was held at 19:02.

Rank	Lane	Name	Nationality	Time	Notes
1st place, gold medalist(s)	4	Roman Zhdanov	Neutral Paralympic Athletes	2:23.03	
2nd place, silver medalist(s)	5	Ami Omer Dadaon	Israel	2:30.50	
3rd place, bronze medalist(s)	3	Ángel Camacho	Mexico	2:37.29	AM
4	6	Jo Gi-seong	South Korea	2:37.45	
5	7	Dimitri Granjux	France	2:48.38	
6	1	Miguel Luque	Spain	2:51.96	
7	8	Efrem Morelli	Italy	2:53.61	
	2	Gustavo Sánchez	Mexico	Disqualified	
