= Swimming at the 2024 Summer Paralympics – Men's 50 metre freestyle S3 =

Men's 50 metre freestyle S3 at the XVII Paralympic Games
- Venue: Paris La Défense Arena
- Dates: 6 September 2024
- Competitors: 14 from 11 nations

Medalists
1st place, gold medalist(s)		Umut Ünlü	Turkey
2nd place, silver medalist(s)		Denys Ostapchenko	Ukraine
3rd place, bronze medalist(s)		Josia Topf	Germany

The men's 50 metre freestyle S3 event at the 2024 Paralympic Games took place on 6 September 2024, at the Paris La Défense Arena.

== Heats ==
The swimmers with the top eight times, regardless of heat, advanced to the final.

Rank	Heat	Lane	Name	Nationality	Time	Notes
1	2	3	Umut Ünlü	Turkey	44.90	Q
2	1	4	Serhii Palamarchuk	Ukraine	45.59	Q
3	2	5	Denys Ostapchenko	Ukraine	46.55	Q
4	1	3	Diego López Díaz	Mexico	47.61	Q
5	2	4	Josia Topf	Germany	49.11	Q
6	1	5	Daniel Ferrer Robles	Spain	49.15	Q
7	2	6	Vincenzo Boni	Italy	51.04	Q
8	2	2	Marcos Zárate	Mexico	51.33	Q
9	2	7	Ahmed Kelly	Australia	52.48	
10	1	6	Krzyzstof Lechniak	Poland	52.76	
11	1	2	Gabriel Araújo	Brazil	52.94	
12	1	7	Emmanuele Marigliano	Italy	55.62	
13	2	1	Charkorn Kaewsri	Thailand	57.89	
14	1	1	Ioannis Kostakis	Greece	1:02.32	

== Final ==
Rank	Lane	Name	Nationality	Time	Notes
1st place, gold medalist(s)	4	Umut Ünlü	Turkey	44.83	
2nd place, silver medalist(s)	3	Denys Ostapchenko	Ukraine	45.14	
3rd place, bronze medalist(s)	2	Josia Topf	Germany	45.61	
4	5	Serhii Palamarchuk	Ukraine	46.35	
5	7	Daniel Ferrer Robles	Spain	46.58	
6	6	Diego López Díaz	Mexico	46.59	
7	1	Vincenzo Boni	Italy	50.95	
8	8	Marcos Zárate	Mexico	52.36	
