= Israel at the 2024 Summer Paralympics =

- IPC code: ISR
- NPC: Israel Paralympic Committee
- Website: www.isad.org.il

in Paris, France August 28, 2024 – September 8, 2024
- Competitors: 27 (13 men and 14 women) in 10 sports and 31 events
- Flag bearers (opening): Lihi Ben David & Adam Berdichevsky
- Flag bearers (closing): Gal Hamrani & Ami Omer Dadaon
- Medals Ranked 29th: Gold 4 Silver 2 Bronze 4 Total 10

Summer Paralympics appearances (overview)
- 1960; 1964; 1968; 1972; 1976; 1980; 1984; 1988; 1992; 1996; 2000; 2004; 2008; 2012; 2016; 2020; 2024

Israel competed at the 2024 Summer Paralympics in Paris, France, from 28 August to 8 September 2024.

== Disability classifications ==
Every participant at the Paralympics has their disability grouped into one of five disability categories; amputation, the condition may be congenital or sustained through injury or illness; cerebral palsy; wheelchair athletes, there is often overlap between this and other categories; visual impairment, including blindness; Les autres, any physical disability that does not fall strictly under one of the other categories, for example dwarfism or multiple sclerosis. Each Paralympic sport then has its own classifications, dependent upon the specific physical demands of competition. Events are given a code, made of numbers and letters, describing the type of event and classification of the athletes competing. Some sports, such as athletics, divide athletes by both the category and the severity of their disabilities. Other sports, for example swimming, group competitors from different categories together, the only separation being based on the severity of the disability.

== Medalists ==
Medal	Name	Sport	Event	Date
Gold	Asaf Yasur	Taekwondo	Men's 58 kg	29 August
Gold	Ami Omer Dadaon	Swimming	Men's 100 m freestyle S4	30 August
Gold	Moran Samuel	Rowing	PR1 women's single sculls	1 September
Gold	Ami Omer Dadaon	Swimming	Men's 200 m freestyle S4	3 September
Silver	Ami Omer Dadaon	Swimming	Men's 150 m individual medley SM4	30 August
Silver	Israel women's national goalball team	Goalball	Women	5 September
Bronze	Mark Malyar	Swimming	Men's 100 m backstroke S8	31 August
Bronze	Saleh Shahin; Shahar Milfelder	Rowing	PR2 mixed double sculls	1 September
Bronze	Guy Sasson	Wheelchair tennis	Quad singles	5 September
Bronze	Ami Omer Dadaon	Swimming	Men's 50 m freestyle S4	6 September

== Competitors ==
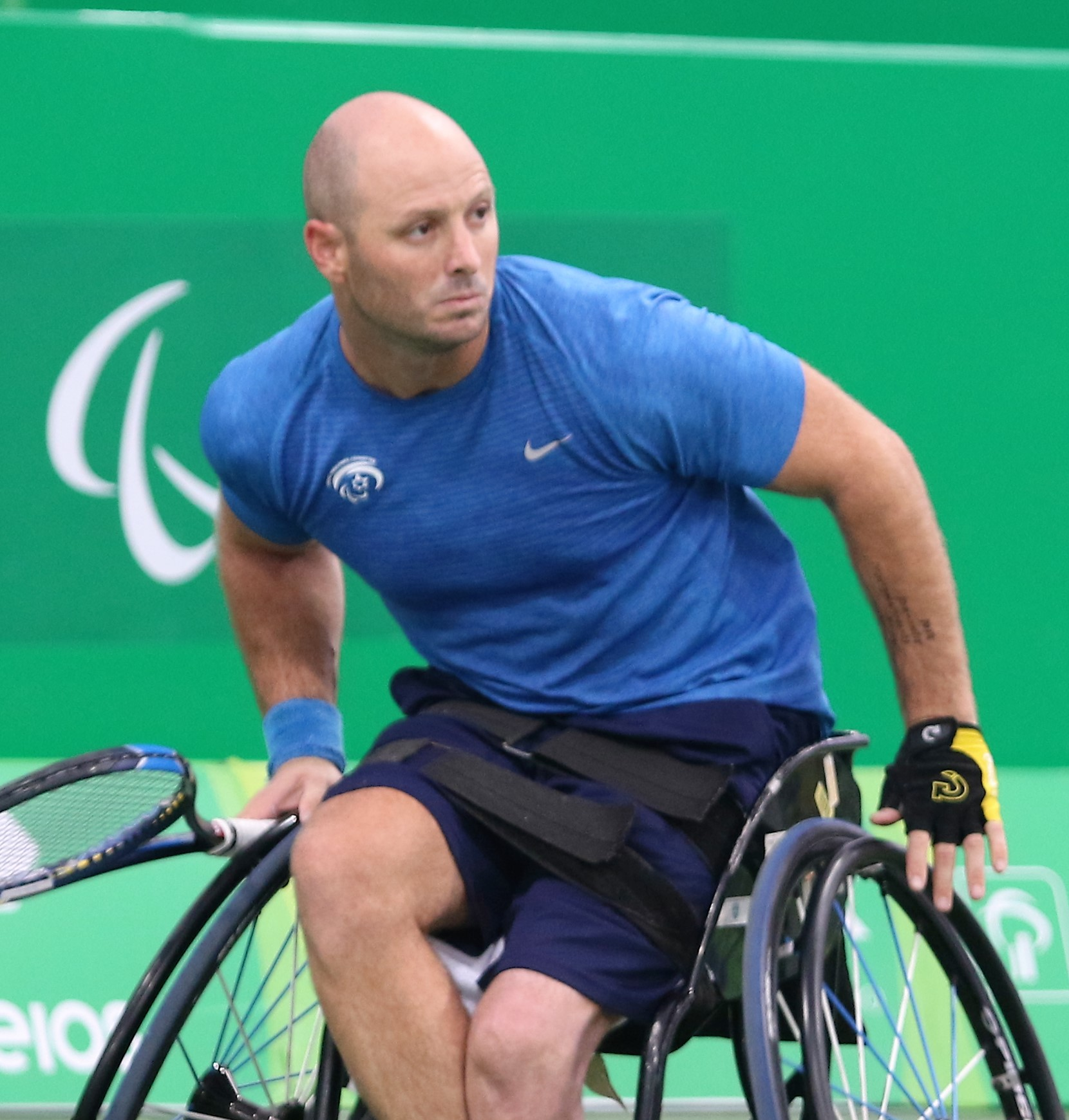
Adam Berdichevsky

Sport	Men	Women	Total
Badminton	1	1	2
Boccia	1	0	1
Cycling	1	0	1
Goalball	0	6	6
Paracanoeing	0	2	2
Rowing	2	2	4
Shooting	0	1	1
Swimming	3	1	4
Taekwondo	2	0	2
Wheelchair tennis	3	1	4
Total	13	14	27

== Badminton ==
Israel qualified two para badminton players for the following events, through the release of BWF para-badminton Race to Paris Paralympic Ranking.

Athlete	Event	Group Stage				Quarterfinal	Semifinal	Final / BM	
Athlete	Event	Opposition Score	Opposition Score	Opposition Score	Rank	Opposition Score	Opposition Score	Opposition Score	Rank
Nina Gorodetzky	Women's singles WH1	Mathez (SUI); L (7–21, 13–21)	Satomi (JPN); L (3–21, 8–21)	Yin (CHN); L (8–21, 5–21)	4	did not advance			10
Amir Levi	Men's singles WH2	Jakobs (FRA); L (12–21, 10–21)	Kim (KOR); L (15–21, 12–21)	—N/a	3	—N/a	did not advance		9

== Boccia ==
Israel entered one athlete to compete in the BC2 event. Nadav Levi qualified for the Games after being nominated as one of the two highest-ranked individuals, not yet qualified, through the release of final world ranking for Paris 2024.

Athlete	Event	Pool matches				Playoffs	Quarterfinals	Semifinals	Final / BM	
Athlete	Event	Opposition Score	Opposition Score	Opposition Score	Rank	Opposition Score	Opposition Score	Opposition Score	Opposition Score	Rank
Nadav Levi	Men's individual BC2	Dekker (NED); W 7–2	Tayahi (TUN); W 8–0 (DNS)	Santos (BRA); L 0–8	2 Q	Cristaldo (ARG); L 4–4*	Did not advance			9

== Cycling ==
Israel sent one male para-cyclist after he finished in the top eligible nations at the 2022 UCI Nation's ranking allocation ranking.

=== Road ===
Men

Athlete	Event	Time	Rank
Amit Hasdai	Men's road race H1–2	DNF	
Amit Hasdai	Men's road time trial H2	29:06.63	4

== Goalball ==
Summary

Team	Event	Group Stage				Quarterfinal	Semifinal	Final / BM	
Team	Event	Opposition Score	Opposition Score	Opposition Score	Rank	Opposition Score	Opposition Score	Opposition Score	Rank
Israel women's	Women's tournament	Brazil; W 8–4	Turkey; L 4–5	China; L 1–6	3 Q	Canada; W 5–1	China; W 2–1	Turkey; L 3–8	2nd place, silver medalist(s)

=== Women's tournament ===
The Israeli women's goalball team qualified for the Paralympic games by virtue of the results at the 2023 IBSA European Championships in Podgorica, Montenegro.

Team roster

Coach: Raz Shoham

The following is the Israel squad in the goalball tournament of the 2024 Summer Paralympics.

No.	Player	Class	Date of birth (age)
1	Elham Mahamid Ruzin	B3	16 February 1990 (aged 34)
2	Noa Malka	B3	15 June 2003 (aged 21)
3	Gal Hamrani	B1	1 December 1992 (aged 31)
4	Or Mizrahi	B3	7 May 1993 (aged 31)
5	Roni Ohayon	B2	8 March 1999 (aged 25)
6	Lihi Ben-David	B1	8 December 1995 (aged 28)

Group stage

Pos	Team	Pld	W	D	L	GF	GA	GD	Pts	Qualification
1	China	3	3	0	0	16	7	+9	9	Quarter-finals
2	Turkey	3	1	1	1	13	14	−1	4	Quarter-finals
3	Israel	3	1	0	2	13	15	−2	3	Quarter-finals
4	Brazil	3	0	1	2	8	14	−6	1	Quarter-finals

Source: Paris 2024
Rules for classification: 1) points; 2) goal difference; 3) number of wins; 4) goals against; 5) head-to-head goal difference.
30 August 2024
10:30

Brazil	4–8	Israel
Vitorino 11', 18'; de Lima 13'; Moura 20'	Report	Mizrahi 8', 13', 16', 22'; Ben-David 8', 10', 16', 20'

South Paris Arena, Paris
Referee:
Patrik Larsson (Sweden)
Claude Dagenais (Canada)

31 August 2024
10:30

Turkey	5–4	Israel
Sevd. Altunoluk 7', 8', 8', 14'; Güler 9'	Report	Mahamid 13'; Ben-David 15', 20'; Mizrahi 23'

South Paris Arena, Paris
Referee:
Claude Dagenais (Canada)
Antonios Christodoulos (Greece)

1 September 2024
14:45

Israel	1–6	China
Mizrahi 18'	Report	Wang Chenyang 3', 13', 20'; Cao 5', 13', 14'

South Paris Arena, Paris
Referee:
Antonios Christodoulos (Greece)
Raquel Aguado (Spain)

Quarter-finals

3 September 2024
15:15

Canada	1–5	Israel
Burk 13'	Report	Ben-David 1', 6', 12', 19'; Mizrahi 18'

South Paris Arena, Paris
Referee:
Sarah Kuper (Germany)
Raquel Aguado (Spain)

Semi-finals

4 September 2024
15:15

China	1–2	Israel
Wang Chunyan 8'	Report	Ben-David 3'; Mahamid 14'

South Paris Arena, Paris
Referee:
Romualdas Vaitiekus (Lithuania)
Janice Dawson (Canada)

Gold medal match

5 September 2024
17:45

Israel	3–8	Turkey
Ben-David 3', 8', 18'	Report	Sevd. Altunoluk 1', 3', 4', 15'; Güler 1', 4', 5', 8'

South Paris Arena, Paris
Referee:
Kazuto Ono (Japan)
Raquel Aguado (Spain)

== Paracanoeing ==
Israel earned quota places for the following events through the 2023 ICF Canoe Sprint World Championships in Duisburg, Germany.

Athlete	Event	Heats		Semifinal		Final	
Athlete	Event	Time	Rank	Time	Rank	Time	Rank
Talia Eilat	Women's KL2	59.23	4 SF	59.20	3 FA	57.41	6
Irina Shafir	Women's VL2	1:19.86	5 SF	1:18.17	5 FB	1:18.57	3 (11)

Qualification Legend: FA=Final A (medal); FB=Final B (non-medal); SF=Semifinal

== Rowing ==
Israeli rowers qualified boats in each of the following classes at the 2023 World Rowing Championships in Belgrade, Serbia, and the 2024 Final Paralympic Qualification Regatta in Lucerne, Switzerland.

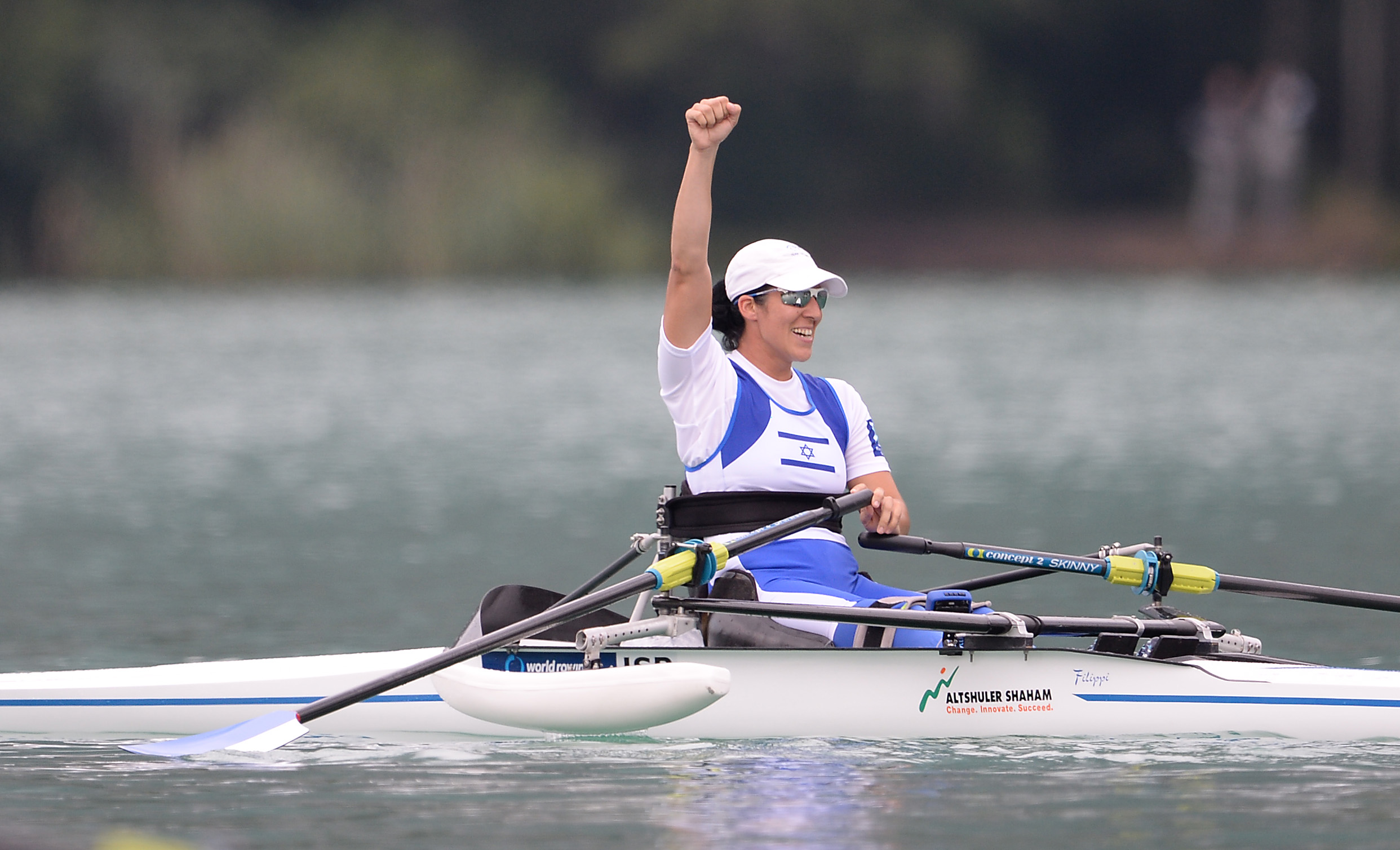
Moran Samuel

Athlete	Event	Heats		Repechage		Final	
Athlete	Event	Time	Rank	Time	Rank	Time	Rank
Shmulik Daniel	PR1 men's single sculls	9:18.99	2 R	9:22.47	1 FA	9:36.94	4
Moran Samuel	PR1 women's single sculls	9:58.02 PGB	1 FA	—N/a		10:25.40	1st place, gold medalist(s)
Saleh Shahin; Shahar Milfelder	PR2 mixed double sculls	8:07.24	2 FA	—N/a		8:31.85	3rd place, bronze medalist(s)

Qualification Legend: FA=Final A (medal); FB=Final B (non-medal); R=Repechage

== Shooting ==
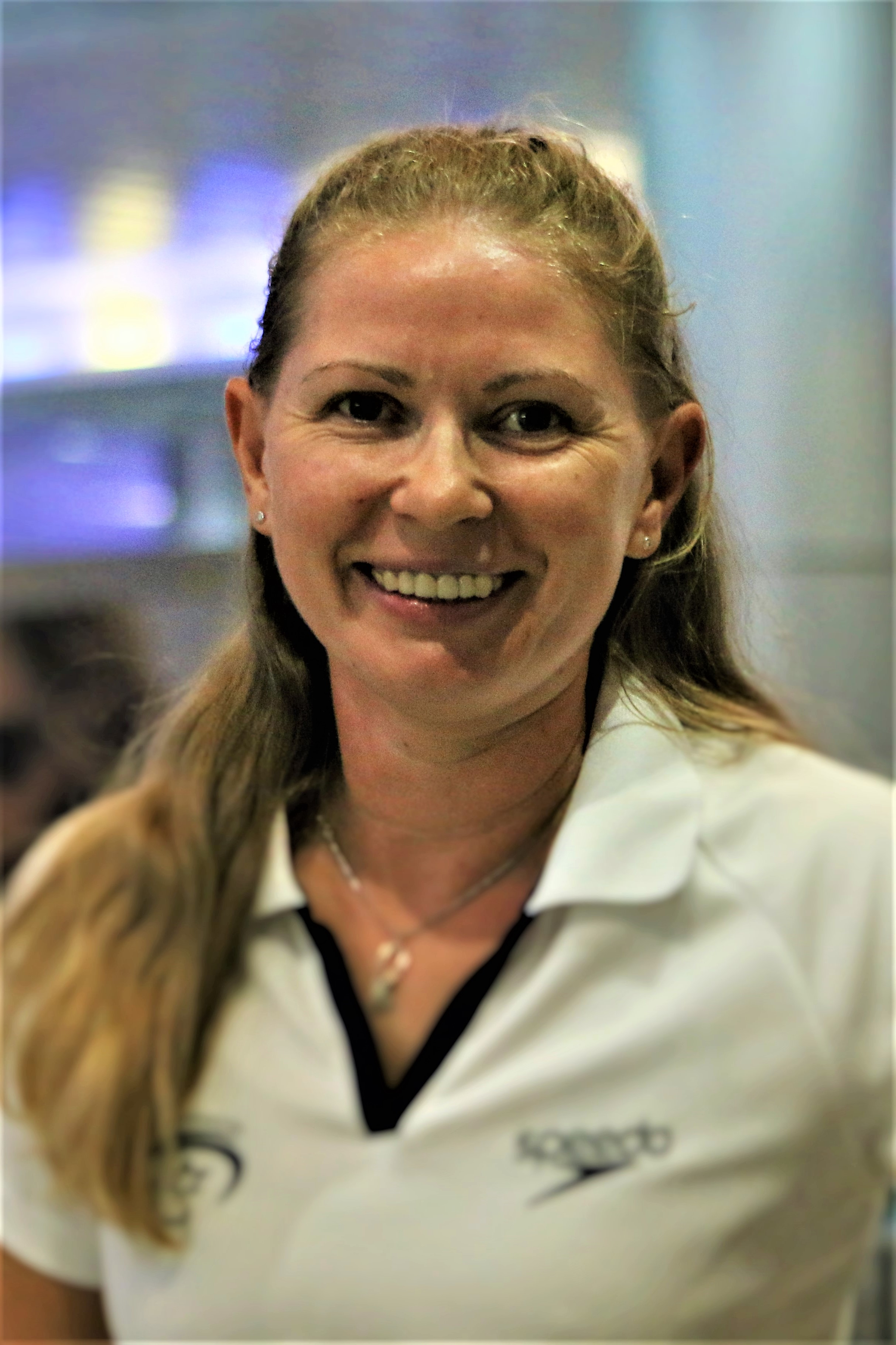
Yuliya Chernoy

Israel entered one para-shooter after achieved quota place for the following events by virtue of their best finishes at the 2022, 2023, and 2024 world cup, 2022 World Championships, 2023 World Championships, 2023 European Para Championships, and 2024 European Championships, as long as they obtained a minimum qualifying score (MQS) by July 15, 2024.

Mixed

Athlete	Event	Qualification		Final	
Athlete	Event	Points	Rank	Points	Rank
Yuliya Chernoy	R3 – 10 m air rifle prone SH1	631.7	16	did not advance	
Yuliya Chernoy	R6 – 50 m air rifle prone SH1	624.2	8 Q	185.3	5

== Swimming ==
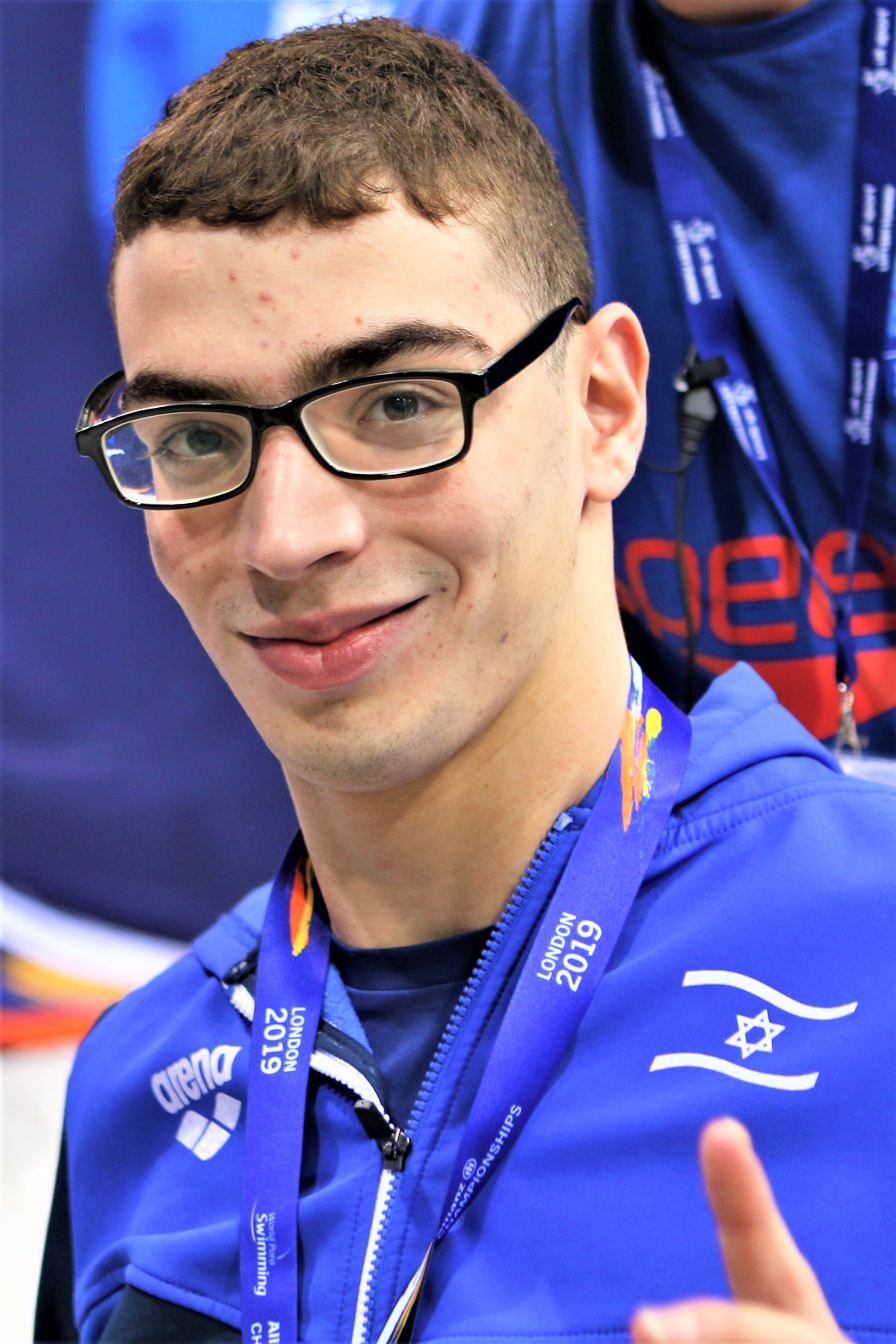
Ami Omer Dadaon

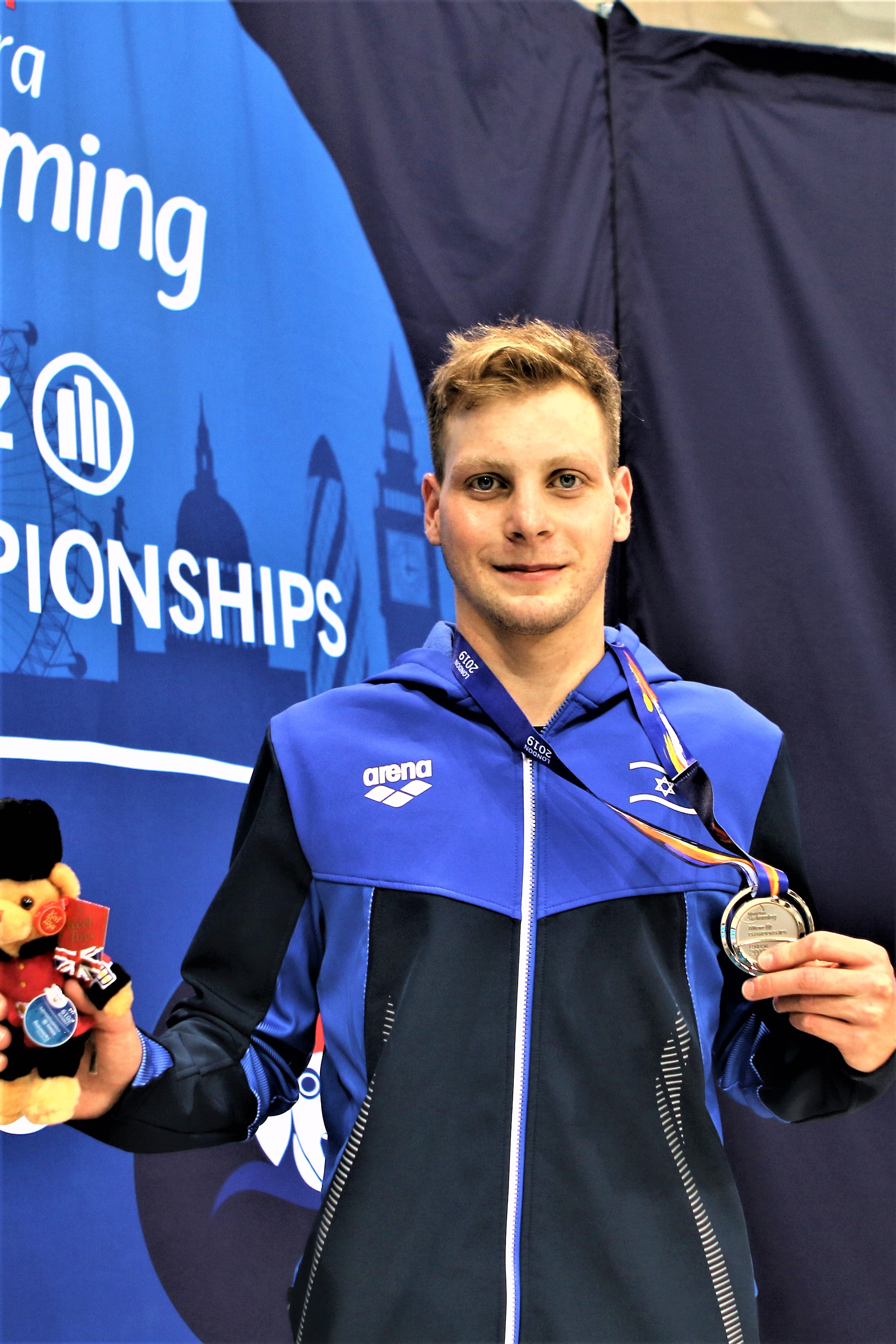
Mark Malyar

Israel secured two quotas at the 2023 World Para Swimming Championships after finishing in the top two places in Paralympic class disciplines. Iyad Shalabi decided to withdraw from the games due to his father's health condition.

Athlete	Event	Heats		Final	
Athlete	Event	Result	Rank	Result	Rank
Ami Omer Dadaon	Men's 50 metre freestyle S4	37.61	3 Q	37.11	3rd place, bronze medalist(s)
Ami Omer Dadaon	Men's 50 metre breaststroke SB3	—N/a		51.34	5
Ami Omer Dadaon	Men's 100 metre freestyle S4	1:19.33 PR	1 Q	1:20.25	1st place, gold medalist(s)
Ami Omer Dadaon	Men's 150 metre individual medley SM4	2:34.71	2 Q	2:30.50	2nd place, silver medalist(s)
Ami Omer Dadaon	Men's 200 metre freestyle S4	2:52.30	1 Q	2:49.26	1st place, gold medalist(s)
Ariel Malyar	Men's 50 metre freestyle S4	40.61	8 Q	40.53	7
Ariel Malyar	Men's 50 metre backstroke S4	53.97	12	did not advance	
Ariel Malyar	Men's 100 metre freestyle S4	1:39.35	12	did not advance	
Ariel Malyar	Men's 200 metre freestyle S4	3:36.70	13	did not advance	
Mark Malyar	Men's 100 metre freestyle S8	1:00.35	9 R	did not advance	
Mark Malyar	Men's 100 metre backstroke S8	1:07.73	3 Q	1:07.42	3rd place, bronze medalist(s)
Mark Malyar	Men's 200 metre individual medley SM8	2:29.86	5 Q	2:26.41	5
Mark Malyar	Men's 400 metre freestyle S8	4:42.39	12	did not advance	
Veronika Guirenko	Women's 50 m backstroke S3	1:09.44	7 Q	1:09.66	8
Veronika Guirenko	Women's 100 m freestyle S3	2:22.31	9 R	did not advance	

== Taekwondo ==
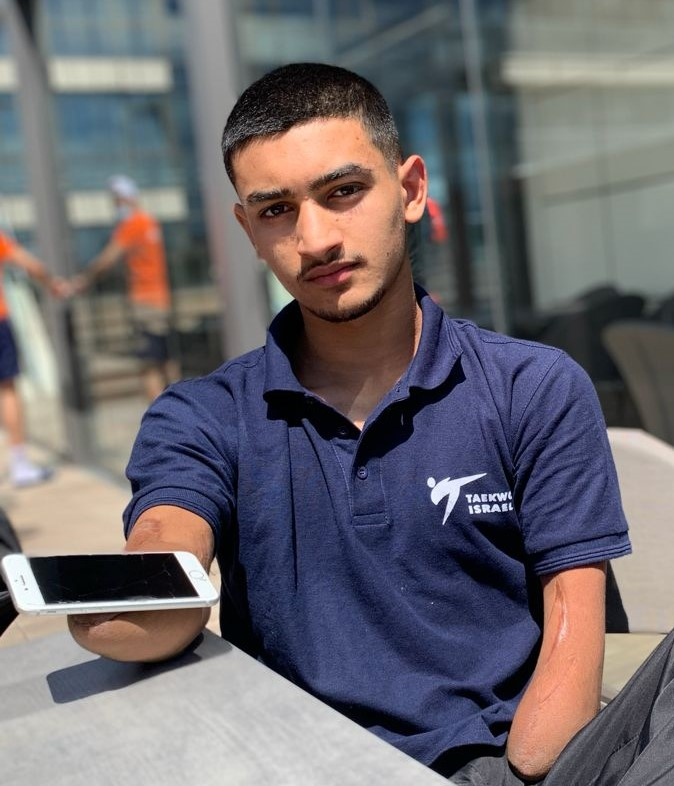
Asaf Yasur

Israel qualified two athletes to compete at the Paralympics competition. Asaf Yasur qualified for Paris 2024, by virtue of finishing within the top six in the Paralympic rankings in his division. Meanwhile, Adnan Milad qualified by winning the 2024 European Qualification Tournament in Sofia, Bulgaria.

Athlete	Event	First round	Quarterfinals	Semifinals	Repechage	Final / BM	
Athlete	Event	Opposition Result	Opposition Result	Opposition Result	Opposition Result	Opposition Result	Rank
Asaf Yasur	Men's –58 kg	Bye	Kaenkham (THA); W 23–6	Xiao (TPE); W 16–6	—N/a	Özcan (TUR); W 19–12	1st place, gold medalist(s)
Adnan Milad	Men's –63 kg	Lee (KOR); W 27–12	Bozteke (TUR); L 7–30	did not advance	Sadeghianpour (IRI); W WWD	Bossolo (ITA); L 13–18	5

== Wheelchair tennis ==
Israel sent 4 wheelchair tennis players to compete in the following competitions.

Athlete	Event	Round of 64	Round of 32	Round of 16	Quarterfinals	Semifinals	Final / BM	
Athlete	Event	Opposition Result	Opposition Result	Opposition Result	Opposition Result	Opposition Result	Opposition Result	Rank
Adam Berdichevsky	Men's singles	Arca (ITA); W 2–0 (6–2, 7–5)	Cataldo (CHI); L 1–2 (1–6, 6–3, 3–6)	did not advance				17
Sergei Lysov	Men's singles	Tapia (CHI); W 2–0 (7–5, 6–1)	Hewett (GBR); L 0–2 (0–6, 1–6)	did not advance				17
Adam Berdichevsky; Sergei Lysov	Men's doubles	—N/a	Bye	Cattanéo / Houdet (FRA); L 0–2 (2–6, 1–6)	did not advance			9
Maayan Zikri	Women's singles	—N/a	Awane (MAR); W 2–0 (6–3, 6–2)	de Groot (NED); L 0–2 (0–6, 0–6)	did not advance			9
Guy Sasson	Quad singles	—N/a		Cayulef (CHI); W 2–0 (6–2, 6–3)	Slade (GBR); W 2–0 (6–1, 6–2)	Schröder (NED); L 0–2 (6^{1}–7, 4–6)	Kaplan (TUR); W 2–1 (5–7, 6–4, 6–1)	3rd place, bronze medalist(s)

== See also ==
- Israel at the Paralympics
- Israel at the 2024 Summer Olympics
