= Sitting volleyball at the 2024 Summer Paralympics – Women's tournament =

Women's sitting volleyball at the XVII Paralympic Games
- Venue: North Paris Arena
- Dates: 29 August – 7 September 2024
- Competitors: 96 from 8 nations

Medalists
1st place, gold medalist(s)		United States (3rd title)
2nd place, silver medalist(s)		China
3rd place, bronze medalist(s)		Canada

The women's tournament in sitting volleyball at the 2024 Summer Paralympics was held between 29 August until 7 September 2024 at the North Paris Arena, Paris.

United States won their third consecutive gold medal with a win over China in the gold medal match. Canada secured bronze by defeating Brazil in the bronze medal match.

== Qualified teams ==
Means of qualification	Date	Venue	Berths	Qualified
Host country allocation	—N/a	—N/a	1	France
2022 Sitting Volleyball World Championships	4–11 November 2022	(Bosnia and Herzegovina) Sarajevo	1	Brazil
2023 Pan American Sitting Volleyball Championships	9–13 May 2023	(Canada) Edmonton	1	United States
2023 Asia and Oceania Sitting Volleyball Championships	3–8 July 2023	(Kazakhstan) Astana	1	China
2023 Sitting Volleyball European Championships	9–15 October 2023	(Italy) Caorle	1	Italy
2023 Sitting Volleyball World Cup	12–18 November 2023	(Egypt) Cairo	1	Canada
2024 African Sitting Volleyball Championships	29 January–3 February 2024	(Nigeria) Lagos	1	Rwanda
2024 Paralympic Final Qualification Tournament	3–10 April 2024	(China) Dali	1	Slovenia
Total			8	

== Schedule ==
All times are Central European Summer Time (UTC+2)

Date	Round
29 August – 3 September 2024	Preliminary Round
4 September 2024	Classification 5-6
4 September 2024	Classification 7-8
5 September 2024	Semifinals
7 September 2024	Bronze Medal Match
7 September 2024	Gold Medal Match
All times are Central European Summer Time (UTC+2)

== Results ==
=== Preliminary round ===
==== Pool A ====
Pos	Team	Pld	W	L	Pts	SW	SL	SR	SPW	SPL	SPR	Qualification
1	China	3	3	0	3	9	1	9.000	247	147	1.680	Semifinals
2	United States	3	2	1	2	7	3	2.333	237	167	1.419	Semifinals
3	Italy	3	1	2	1	3	6	0.500	177	171	1.035	Fifth place match
4	France (H)	3	0	3	0	0	9	0.000	49	225	0.218	Seventh place match

Source: Paris 2024
(H) Host

30 August 2024; 12:00	United States	1–3	China	North Paris Arena, Paris; Attendance: 2,833; Referees: Slavisa Kuzmanovic (BIH), Ayan Rakhmetov (KAZ)
30 August 2024; 12:00	(25–21, 20–25, 18–25, 24–26); P2 Report			North Paris Arena, Paris; Attendance: 2,833; Referees: Slavisa Kuzmanovic (BIH), Ayan Rakhmetov (KAZ)

30 August 2024; 20:00	France	0–3	Italy	North Paris Arena, Paris; Attendance: 3,752; Referees: Marie-Claude Richer (CAN), Khalid Shanishah (LBA)
30 August 2024; 20:00	(9–25, 6–25, 6–25); P2 Report			North Paris Arena, Paris; Attendance: 3,752; Referees: Marie-Claude Richer (CAN), Khalid Shanishah (LBA)

1 September 2024; 14:00	Italy	0–3	China	North Paris Arena, Paris; Attendance: 3,860; Referees: Andre Calado Ferreira (BRA), Spela Plesnik (SLO)
1 September 2024; 14:00	(15–25, 16–25, 12–25); P2 Report			North Paris Arena, Paris; Attendance: 3,860; Referees: Andre Calado Ferreira (BRA), Spela Plesnik (SLO)

1 September 2024; 20:15	France	0–3	United States	North Paris Arena, Paris; Attendance: 3,874; Referees: Mahdi Navidino (IRN), Neal Konowalyk (GER)
1 September 2024; 20:15	(5–25, 1–25, 5–25); P2 Report			North Paris Arena, Paris; Attendance: 3,874; Referees: Mahdi Navidino (IRN), Neal Konowalyk (GER)

3 September 2024; 14:00	United States	3–0	Italy	North Paris Arena, Paris; Attendance: 2,275; Referees: Spela Plesnik (SLO), Marie-Claude Richer (CAN)
3 September 2024; 14:00	(25–21, 25–23, 25–15); P2 Report			North Paris Arena, Paris; Attendance: 2,275; Referees: Spela Plesnik (SLO), Marie-Claude Richer (CAN)

3 September 2024; 20:20	China	3–0	France	North Paris Arena, Paris; Attendance: 2,377; Referees: Mahdi Navidino (IRN), Krisztina Arpas (HUN)
3 September 2024; 20:20	(25–7, 25–5, 25–5); P2 Report			North Paris Arena, Paris; Attendance: 2,377; Referees: Mahdi Navidino (IRN), Krisztina Arpas (HUN)

==== Pool B ====
Pos	Team	Pld	W	L	Pts	SW	SL	SR	SPW	SPL	SPR	Qualification
1	Brazil	3	3	0	3	9	1	9.000	248	162	1.531	Semifinals
2	Canada	3	2	1	2	7	3	2.333	235	186	1.263	Semifinals
3	Slovenia	3	1	2	1	3	7	0.429	189	230	0.822	Fifth place match
4	Rwanda	3	0	3	0	1	9	0.111	154	248	0.621	Seventh place match

Source: Paris 2024

29 August 2024; 12:00	Brazil	3–0	Rwanda	North Paris Arena, Paris; Attendance: 3,306; Referees: Krisztina Arpas (HUN), Spela Plesnik (SLO)
29 August 2024; 12:00	(25–13, 25–10, 25–7); P2 Report			North Paris Arena, Paris; Attendance: 3,306; Referees: Krisztina Arpas (HUN), Spela Plesnik (SLO)

29 August 2024; 18:00	Canada	3–0	Slovenia	North Paris Arena, Paris; Attendance: 4,072; Referees: Benno Meijer (NED), Philippe Dauchel (FRA)
29 August 2024; 18:00	(25–11, 25–21, 25–12); P2 Report			North Paris Arena, Paris; Attendance: 4,072; Referees: Benno Meijer (NED), Philippe Dauchel (FRA)

31 August 2024; 12:00	Slovenia	3–1	Rwanda	North Paris Arena, Paris; Attendance: 3,851; Referees: Philippe Dauchel (FRA), Ayan Rakhmetov (KAZ)
31 August 2024; 12:00	(25–19, 23–25, 25–14, 25–22); P2 Report			North Paris Arena, Paris; Attendance: 3,851; Referees: Philippe Dauchel (FRA), Ayan Rakhmetov (KAZ)

31 August 2024; 20:00	Canada	1–3	Brazil	North Paris Arena, Paris; Attendance: 3,872; Referees: Mirza Basic (BIH), Slavisa Kuzmenovic (BIH)
31 August 2024; 20:00	(20–25, 21–25, 25–23, 19–25); P2 Report			North Paris Arena, Paris; Attendance: 3,872; Referees: Mirza Basic (BIH), Slavisa Kuzmenovic (BIH)

2 September 2024; 14:20	Brazil	3–0	Slovenia	North Paris Arena, Paris; Attendance: 1,835; Referees: Benno Meijer (NED), Amina Elsergany (EGY)
2 September 2024; 14:20	(25–14, 25–18, 25–15); P2 Report			North Paris Arena, Paris; Attendance: 1,835; Referees: Benno Meijer (NED), Amina Elsergany (EGY)

2 September 2024; 18:00	Rwanda	0–3	Canada	North Paris Arena, Paris; Attendance: 2,338; Referees: Slavisa Kuzmenovic (BIH), Philippe Dauchel (FRA)
2 September 2024; 18:00	(14–25, 17–25, 13–25); P2 Report			North Paris Arena, Paris; Attendance: 2,338; Referees: Slavisa Kuzmenovic (BIH), Philippe Dauchel (FRA)

== Knockout stage ==
=== Bracket ===
Semifinals
5 September
China	3
Canada	0
5 September
Brazil	1
United States	3

Gold medal match
7 September
China	1
United States	3
Bronze medal match
7 September
Canada	3
Brazil	0

=== Semifinals ===
5 September 2024; 18:00	Brazil	1–3	United States	North Paris Arena, Paris; Attendance: 2,575; Referees: Slavisa Kuzmanovic (BIH), Philippe Dauchel (FRA)
5 September 2024; 18:00	(22–25, 25–22, 14–25, 15–25); P2 Report			North Paris Arena, Paris; Attendance: 2,575; Referees: Slavisa Kuzmanovic (BIH), Philippe Dauchel (FRA)

5 September 2024; 20:30	China	3–0	Canada	North Paris Arena, Paris; Attendance: 2,575; Referees: Krisztina Arpas (HUN), Spela Plesnik (SLO)
5 September 2024; 20:30	(25–16, 25–22, 25–18); P2 Report			North Paris Arena, Paris; Attendance: 2,575; Referees: Krisztina Arpas (HUN), Spela Plesnik (SLO)

=== Seventh place match ===
4 September 2024; 14:00	France	0–3	Rwanda	North Paris Arena, Paris; Attendance: 2,583; Referees: Amina Elsergany (EGY), Marie-Claude Richer (CAN)
4 September 2024; 14:00	(9–25, 8–25, 11–25); P2 Report			North Paris Arena, Paris; Attendance: 2,583; Referees: Amina Elsergany (EGY), Marie-Claude Richer (CAN)

=== Fifth place match ===
4 September 2024; 18:00	Italy	3–0	Slovenia	North Paris Arena, Paris; Attendance: 1,570; Referees: Khalid Shanishah (LBA), Krisztina Arpas (HUN)
4 September 2024; 18:00	(25–19, 25–13, 25–19); P2 Report			North Paris Arena, Paris; Attendance: 1,570; Referees: Khalid Shanishah (LBA), Krisztina Arpas (HUN)

=== Bronze medal match ===
7 September 2024; 15:00	Canada	3–0	Brazil	North Paris Arena, Paris; Attendance: 4,054; Referees: Mirza Basic (BIH), Ayan Rakhmetov (KAZ)
7 September 2024; 15:00	(25–15, 25–18, 25–18); P2 Report			North Paris Arena, Paris; Attendance: 4,054; Referees: Mirza Basic (BIH), Ayan Rakhmetov (KAZ)

=== Gold medal match ===
7 September 2024; 19:30	China	1–3	United States	North Paris Arena, Paris; Attendance: 4,089; Referees: Marie-Claude Richer (CAN), Krisztina Arpas (HUN)
7 September 2024; 19:30	(21–25, 25–23, 20–25, 22–25); P2 Report			North Paris Arena, Paris; Attendance: 4,089; Referees: Marie-Claude Richer (CAN), Krisztina Arpas (HUN)

== Final ranking ==
Rank	Team
1st place, gold medalist(s)	United States
2nd place, silver medalist(s)	China
3rd place, bronze medalist(s)	Canada
4	Brazil
5	Italy
6	Slovenia
7	Rwanda
8	France

== See also ==
- Sitting volleyball at the 2024 Summer Paralympics – Men's tournament
