= Canada at the 2024 Summer Paralympics =

- Flag of Canada
- IPC code: CAN
- NPC: Canadian Paralympic Committee
- Website: www.paralympic.ca

in Paris, France August 28, 2024 – September 8, 2024
- Competitors: 125 in 18 sports
- Flag bearers (opening): Patrick Anderson & Katarina Roxon
- Flag bearers (closing): Nicholas Bennett & Brianna Hennessy
- Medals Ranked 12th: Gold 10 Silver 9 Bronze 10 Total 29

Summer Paralympics appearances (overview)
- 1968; 1972; 1976; 1980; 1984; 1988; 1992; 1996; 2000; 2004; 2008; 2012; 2016; 2020; 2024

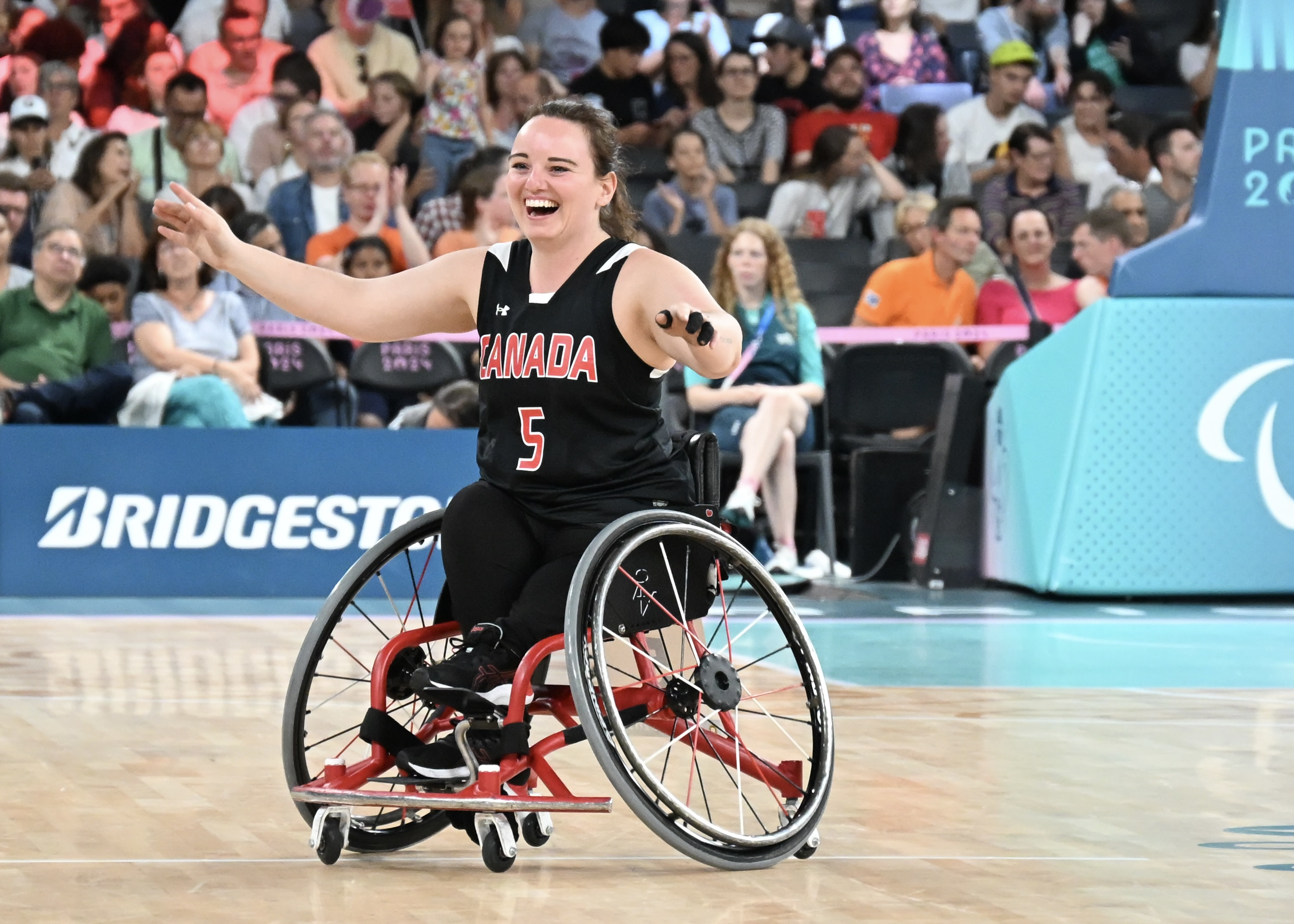
Elodie Tessier in the women's wheelchair basketball match against the Netherlands

Canada competed in the 2024 Summer Paralympics in Paris, France, from August 28 to September 8, 2024.

== Medallists ==
Medal	Name	Sport	Event	Date
Gold	Nicholas Bennett	Swimming	Men's 100 metre breaststroke SB14	September 2
Gold	Cody Fournie	Athletics	Men's 200 metres T51	September 3
Gold	Greg Stewart	Athletics	Men's shot put F46	September 4
Gold	Nicholas Bennett	Swimming	Men's 200 metre individual medley SM14	September 4
Gold	Aurélie Rivard	Swimming	Women's 400 metre freestyle S10	September 5
Gold	Brent Lakatos	Athletics	Men's 800 metres T53	September 5
Gold	Sebastian Massabie	Swimming	Men's 50 metre freestyle S4	September 6
Gold	Cody Fournie	Athletics	Men's 100 metres T51	September 6
Gold	Austin Smeenk	Athletics	Men's 800 metres T34	September 7
Gold	Danielle Dorris	Swimming	Women's 50 metre butterfly S7	September 7
Silver	Nicholas Bennett	Swimming	Men's 200 metre freestyle S14	August 31
Silver	Tess Routliffe	Swimming	Women's 200 metre individual medley SM7	August 31
Silver	Brent Lakatos	Athletics	Men's 400 metres T53	September 1
Silver	Aurélie Rivard	Swimming	Women's 100 metre freestyle S10	September 1
Silver	Nathan Clement	Cycling	Men's road time trial T1–2	September 4
Silver	Reid Maxwell	Swimming	Men's 400 metre freestyle S8	September 5
Silver	Jesse Zesseu	Athletics	Men's discus throw F37	September 6
Silver	Brianna Hennessy	Paracanoeing	Women's VL2	September 7
Silver	Nathan Riech	Athletics	Men's 1500 metres T38	September 7
Bronze	Kate O'Brien	Cycling	Women's time trial C4–5	August 29
Bronze	Aurélie Rivard	Swimming	Women's 50 metre freestyle S10	August 29
Bronze	Keely Shaw	Cycling	Women's pursuit C4	August 30
Bronze	Alexandre Hayward	Cycling	Men's pursuit C3	August 30
Bronze	Austin Smeenk	Athletics	Men's 100 metres T34	September 2
Bronze	Leanne Taylor	Paratriathlon	Women's PTWC	September 2
Bronze	Katie Cosgriffe	Swimming	Women's 100 metre butterfly S10	September 3
Bronze	Tess Routliffe	Swimming	Women's 100 metre breaststroke SB7	September 5
Bronze	Canada women's national sitting volleyball team: Danielle Ellis; Anne Fergusson; Julie Kozun; Allison Lang; Jennifer McCreesh; Sarah Melenka; Jennifer Oakes; Heidi Peters; Felicia Voss-Shafiq; Jolan Wong; Katelyn Wright	Sitting volleyball	Women's tournament	September 7
Bronze	Shelby Newkirk	Swimming	Women's 100 metre backstroke S6	September 7

== Competitors ==
The following is the list of athletes per sport/discipline.

Sport	Men	Women	Total
Archery	1	0	1
Athletics	10	10	20
Badminton	0	1	1
Boccia	3	1	4
Cycling	4	3	7
Equestrian	1	2	3
Goalball	0	6	6
Judo	0	1	1
Paracanoeing	1	2	3
Paratriathlon	1	2	3
Rowing	1	0	1
Sitting volleyball	0	12	12
Swimming	7	15	22
Table tennis	1	0	1
Wheelchair basketball	12	12	24
Wheelchair fencing	1	2	3
Wheelchair rugby	12	0	12
Wheelchair tennis	1	0	1
Total	56	69	125

== Archery ==
Canada entered one male archer into the games by virtue of his result at the 2023 Parapan American Games in Santiago, Chile.

Athlete	Event	Ranking Round		Round of 32	Round of 16	Quarterfinals	Semifinals	Finals	
Athlete	Event	Score	Seed	Opposition Score	Opposition Score	Opposition Score	Opposition Score	Opposition Score	Rank
Kyle Tremblay	Men's individual compound	697	4	Manshaezadeh (IRI); W 140–135	Meier (AUT); W 140–139	Kumar (IND); L 144–144	Did not advance		6

== Athletics ==
Canadian track and field athletes achieved quota places for the following events based on their results at the 2023 World Championships, 2024 World Championships, or through high performance allocation, as long as they meet the minimum entry standard (MES).

Key

- Note–Ranks given for track events are within the athlete's heat only
- Q = Qualified for the next round
- q = Qualified for the next round as a fastest loser or, in field events, by position without achieving the qualifying target
- DQ = Disqualified
- PR = Paralympic Record
- AR = Area (or continental) Record
- NR = National Record
- SB = Season's Best
- N/A = Round not applicable for the event
- Bye = Athlete not required to compete in round

Track & road events
Men

Athlete	Event	Heat		Final	
Athlete	Event	Result	Rank	Result	Rank
Anthony Bouchard	100 m T52	17.43	2	17.55	4
Anthony Bouchard	400 m T52	1:05.98	4 q	1:04.09	6
Cody Fournie	100 m T51	—N/a		19.63 PR, AR	1st place, gold medalist(s)
Cody Fournie	200 m T51	—N/a		37.64 PB	1st place, gold medalist(s)
Zach Gingras	400 m T38	—N/a		50.63 SB	5
Brent Lakatos	400 m T53	49.04	1 Q	47.24 SB	2nd place, silver medalist(s)
Brent Lakatos	800 m T53	—N/a		1:37.32 SB	1st place, gold medalist(s)
Brent Lakatos	1500 m T54	2:59.19 SB	8	Did not advance	
Brent Lakatos	5000 m T54	10:35.15 SB	2 Q	10:56.73	7
Guillaume Ouellet	5000 m T13	—N/a		16:07.71	5
Nate Riech	1500 m T38	—N/a		4:13.12	2nd place, silver medalist(s)
Austin Smeenk	100 m T34	15.38	1 Q	15.19	3rd place, bronze medalist(s)
Austin Smeenk	800 m T34	1:44.91	2 Q	1:39.27	1st place, gold medalist(s)

Women

Athlete	Event	Heat		Final	
Athlete	Event	Result	Rank	Result	Rank
Bianca Borgella	100 m T13	12.15	2 Q	25.11	8
Keegan Gaunt	400 m T13	1:03.16	6	Did not advance	
Keegan Gaunt	1500 m T13	—N/a		4:51.33	9
Sheriauna Haase	100 m T47	12.47 SB	2 Q	12.53	4
Sheriauna Haase	200 m T47	25.87	3 q	25.76	6
Marissa Papaconstantinou	100 m T64	13.24	5 q	13.25	7
Marissa Papaconstantinou	200 m T64	27.47	3 Q	27.30	4
Amanda Rummery	400 m T47	59.24	2 Q	58.02	5

Field events
Men

Athlete	Event	Final	
Athlete	Event	Result	Rank
Greg Stewart	Shot put F46	16.38 SB	1st place, gold medalist(s)
Noah Vucsics	Long jump T20	7.15	5
Jesse Zesseu	Discus throw F37	53.24	2nd place, silver medalist(s)

Women

Athlete	Event	Final	
Athlete	Event	Result	Rank
Charlotte Bolton	Discus throw F41	28.53	6
Charlotte Bolton	Shot put F41	7.92	10
Renee Foessel	Discus throw F38	34.40	6
Julia Hanes	Shot put F33	7.15 PB	6
Julia Hanes	Javelin throw F34	15.34	8
Katie Pegg	Shot put F46	10.72	7
Ashlyn Renneberg	Javelin throw F13	30.93	7

== Badminton ==
Athlete	Event	Group stage				Quarterfinals	Seminfinals	Final	
Athlete	Event	Opposition Score	Opposition Score	Opposition Score	Rank	Opposition Score	Opposition Score	Opposition Score	Rank
Yuka Chokyu	Women's singles WH1	Hu (TPE); L 0–2 (12–21, 12–21)	Torres (BRA); L 1–2 (16–21, 21–15, 7–21)	Pookkham (THA); L 0–2 (3–21, 1–21)	=10	Did not advance			

== Boccia ==
Canadian athletes secured a quota in BC4 pairs after winning gold at the 2023 Parapan American Games in Santiago, Chile.

Athlete	Event	Pool matches				Playoffs	Quarterfinals	Semifinals	Final / BM	
Athlete	Event	Opposition Score	Opposition Score	Opposition Score	Rank	Opposition Score	Opposition Score	Opposition Score	Opposition Score	Rank
Lance Cryderman	Men's individual BC1	Ramos (POR); L 0–7	Luong (HKG); L 1–5	—N/a	3	—N/a	Did not advance			12
Danik Allard	Men's individual BC2	Hirose (JPN); L 2–6	Yudha (INA); L 1–11	Yang (CHN); L 0–9	4	Did not advance				23
Iulian Ciobanu	Men's individual BC4	Kolinko (UKR); L 1–6	Abdul Rahman (MAL); W 6–4	McGuire (GBR); W 4–2	3	—N/a	Did not advance			9
Alison Levine	Women's individual BC4	Elfar (EGY); W 4–3	Mat Salim (MAL); L 2–3	Konenko (UKR); W 5–3	2 Q	—N/a	Chica (COL); L 2–3	Did not advance		5
Iulian Ciobanu; Alison Levine	Mixed pairs BC4	China; W 8–5	Croatia; W 6–4	—N/a	1 Q	—N/a	Ukraine; W 6–0	Hong Kong; L 4–6	Thailand; L 1–6	4

== Cycling ==
Canada qualified a total of seven cyclists (four men and three women). The team was officially announced on July 29, 2024. On September 1, 2024, Michael Sametz withdrew from the Games due to injury.

=== Road ===
Men

Athlete	Event	Time	Rank
Nathan Clement	Men's road race T1-2	1:31:20	9
Nathan Clement	Men's time trial T1-2	22:53.36	2nd place, silver medalist(s)
Alexandre Hayward	Men's road race C1-3	1:45:09	4
Alexandre Hayward	Men's time trial C3	39:30.48	5
Charles Moreau	Men's road race H3	DNF	
Charles Moreau	Men's time trial H3	47:15.72	7

Women

Athlete	Event	Time	Rank
Kate O'Brien	Women's time trial C4	DNF	
Mel Pemble	Women's time trial C1-3	26:05.83	14
Keely Shaw	Women's road race C4-5	2:09:28	15
Keely Shaw	Women's time trial C4	22:09.19	5

=== Track ===
Men

Athlete	Event	Qualification		Final	
Athlete	Event	Result	Rank	Result	Rank
Alexandre Hayward	Men's pursuit C3	3:26.940	4 Q	Final bronze medal Santas Asensio (ESP); W 3:24.865-3:28.617	3rd place, bronze medalist(s)

Women

Athlete	Event	Qualification		Final	
Athlete	Event	Result	Rank	Result	Rank
Kate O'Brien	Women's time trial C4–5	36.994	4 Q	36.873	3rd place, bronze medalist(s)
Mel Pemble	Women's time trial C1–3	38.512	4 Q	38.610	4
Keely Shaw	Women's pursuit C4	3:44.012	3 Q	3:36.942	3rd place, bronze medalist(s)
Keely Shaw	Women's time trial C4–5	39.893	10	Did not advance	

== Equestrian ==
Canada entered a full squad of four para-equestrianis into the Paralympic equestrian competition, as the highest Americas team, not yet qualified, through final world para dressage rankings.

Individual

Athlete	Horse	Event	Total	
Athlete	Horse	Event	Score	Rank
Roberta Sheffield	Fairuza	Individual championship test grade II	70.345 Q	6
Roberta Sheffield	Fairuza	Individual freestyle test grade II	73.187	6
Jody Schloss	El Colorado	Individual championship test grade I	66.375	17
Austen Burns	Happy Feet 3	Individual championship test grade I	68.667	12

Team

Athlete	Horse	Event	Individual score	Total	
Athlete	Horse	Event	TT	Score	Rank
Roberta Sheffield	See above	Team	70.967	208.509	11
Jody Schloss	See above	Team	69.375	208.509	11
Austen Burns	See above	Team	68.167	208.509	11

== Goalball ==
Summary

Team	Event	Group Stage				Quarterfinal	Semifinal	Final / BM	
Team	Event	Opposition Score	Opposition Score	Opposition Score	Rank	Opposition Score	Opposition Score	Opposition Score	Rank
Canada women's	Women's tournament	France; W 10–0	Japan; L 1–2	South Korea; D 0–0	2 Q	Israel; L 1–5	—N/a	Japan; W 1–0	5

=== Women's tournament ===
The Canadian women's goalball team qualified for the xparalympic games by virtue of the results at the 2023 Parapan American Games in Santiago, Chile.

Team roster

Coach: Trent Farebrother

The following is the Canada squad in the goalball tournament of the 2024 Summer Paralympics.

No.	Player	Class	Date of birth (age)
1	Maryam Salehizadeh	B3	21 September 1986 (aged 37)
3	Whitney Bogart	B3	21 April 1986 (aged 38)
4	Meghan Mahon	B3	15 January 1996 (aged 28)
5	Emma Reinke	B3	22 June 1998 (aged 26)
6	Brieann Tracy Kelly Baldock	B3	14 December 1995 (aged 28)
7	Amy Burk	B3	17 March 1990 (aged 34)

Group stage

Pos	Team	Pld	W	D	L	GF	GA	GD	Pts	Qualification
1	Japan	3	3	0	0	11	2	+9	9	Quarter-finals
2	Canada	3	1	1	1	11	2	+9	4	Quarter-finals
3	South Korea	3	1	1	1	7	4	+3	4	Quarter-finals
4	France (H)	3	0	0	3	1	22	−21	0	Quarter-finals

Source: Paris 2024
Rules for classification: 1) points; 2) goal difference; 3) number of wins; 4) goals against; 5) head-to-head goal difference.
(H) Hosts
29 August 2024
14:45

Canada	10–0	France
Salehizadeh 1', 4'; Reinke 1', 5', 9', 20', 20', 21'; Mahon 13'; Burk 22'	Report

South Paris Arena, Paris
Referee:
Antonios Christodoulos (Greece)
Juha Vuokila (Finland)

30 August 2024
14:45

Japan	2–1	Canada
Hagiwara 10', 22'	Report	Reinke 0'

South Paris Arena, Paris
Referee:
Raquel Aguado (Spain)
Linda Welborn (United States)

1 September 2024
10:30

South Korea	0–0	Canada
	Report

South Paris Arena, Paris
Referee:
Romualdas Vaitiekus (Lithuania)
Kazuto Ono (Japan)

Quarter-finals

3 September 2024
15:15

Canada	1–5	Israel
Burk 13'	Report	Ben-David 1', 6', 12', 19'; Mizrahi 18'

South Paris Arena, Paris
Referee:
Sarah Kuper (Germany)
Raquel Aguado (Spain)

Fifth place match

4 September 2024
11:45

Japan	0–1	Canada
	Report	Burk 4'

South Paris Arena, Paris
Referee:
Sarah Kuper (Germany)
Linda Welborn (United States)

== Judo ==
Athlete	Event	Round of 16	Quarterfinals	Semifinals	Repechage	Final / BM	
Athlete	Event	Opposition Result	Opposition Result	Opposition Result	Opposition Result	Opposition Result	Rank
Priscilla Gagne	Women's – 57 kg J1	Bye	Oliveira da Silva (BRA); W 10–0	Shi (CHN); L 0–10	—N/a	Gomez (ARG); L 1–11	5

== Paracanoeing ==
Canada earned quota places for the following events through the 2023 ICF Canoe Sprint World Championships in Duisburg, Germany; and 2024 ICF Canoe Sprint World Championships in Szeged, Hungary.

Athlete	Event	Heats		Semifinal		Final	
Athlete	Event	Time	Rank	Time	Rank	Time	Rank
Mathieu St-Pierre	Men's VL2	58.46	4 SF	55.74	2 FA	54.37	6
Brianna Hennessy	Women's VL2	1:02.64	1 FA	—N/a		1:00.12	2nd place, silver medalist(s)
Brianna Hennessy	Women's KL1	59.02	4 SF	57.00	1 FA	54.47	4
Erica Scarff	Women's VL3	1:01.16	3 SF	59.97	2 FA	59.48	5

Qualification Legend: F=Direct qualification to final; SF=Semi-final; FA=Final A; FB=Final B (non-medal)

== Paratriathlon ==
Canada named three paratriathletes to compete for Canada at the Paris 2024 Paralympic Games.

Athlete	Event	Final	
Athlete	Event	Time	Rank
Stefan Daniel	Men's PTS5	1:03:58	10
Kamylle Frenette	Women's PTS5	1:09:50	4
Leanne Taylor	Women's PTWC	1:12:11	3rd place, bronze medalist(s)

== Rowing ==
Canada qualified one boat in men's single sculls classes, by virtue of the highest ranked eligible boats, at the 2024 Pan American Continental Qualification Regatta in Rio de Janeiro, Brazil.

Athlete	Event	Heats		Repechage		Final	
Athlete	Event	Time	Rank	Time	Rank	Time	Rank
Jacob Wassermann	PR1 men's single sculls	11:22.35	6 R	11:28.31	4 FB	11:58.90	9

Qualification Legend: FA=Final A (medal); FB=Final B (non-medal); R=Repechage

== Sitting volleyball ==
Summary

Team	Event	Group stage				Semifinal	Final / BM / Cl.	
Team	Event	Opposition Score	Opposition Score	Opposition Score	Rank	Opposition Score	Opposition Score	Rank
Canada women's	Women's tournament	Slovenia; W 3–0	Brazil; L 1–3	Rwanda; W 3–0	2 Q	China; L 0–3	Brazil; W 3–0	3rd place, bronze medalist(s)

=== Women's tournament ===
Canada women's national sitting volleyball team qualified for the 2024 Summer Paralympics after finishing as the top ranked unqualified nation at the 2023 World ParaVolley World Cup held in Cairo, Egypt.

Team roster

- Angelena Dolezar
- Danielle Ellis
- Anne Fergusson
- Julie Kozun
- Allison Lang
- Jennifer McCreesh
- Sarah Melenka
- Jennifer Gerilyn Oakes
- Heidi Peters
- Felicia Voss-Shafiq
- Jolan Wong
- Katelyn Wright

Group play

Pos	Team	Pld	W	L	Pts	SW	SL	SR	SPW	SPL	SPR	Qualification
1	Brazil	3	3	0	3	9	1	9.000	248	162	1.531	Semifinals
2	Canada	3	2	1	2	7	3	2.333	235	186	1.263	Semifinals
3	Slovenia	3	1	2	1	3	7	0.429	189	230	0.822	Fifth place match
4	Rwanda	3	0	3	0	1	9	0.111	154	248	0.621	Seventh place match

Source: Paris 2024

29 August 2024; 18:00	Canada	3–0	Slovenia	North Paris Arena, Paris; Attendance: 4,072; Referees: Benno Meijer (NED), Philippe Dauchel (FRA)
29 August 2024; 18:00	(25–11, 25–21, 25–12); P2 Report			North Paris Arena, Paris; Attendance: 4,072; Referees: Benno Meijer (NED), Philippe Dauchel (FRA)

31 August 2024; 20:00	Canada	1–3	Brazil	North Paris Arena, Paris; Attendance: 3,872; Referees: Mirza Basic (BIH), Slavisa Kuzmenovic (BIH)
31 August 2024; 20:00	(20–25, 21–25, 25–23, 19–25); P2 Report			North Paris Arena, Paris; Attendance: 3,872; Referees: Mirza Basic (BIH), Slavisa Kuzmenovic (BIH)

2 September 2024; 18:00	Rwanda	0–3	Canada	North Paris Arena, Paris; Attendance: 2,338; Referees: Slavisa Kuzmenovic (BIH), Philippe Dauchel (FRA)
2 September 2024; 18:00	(14–25, 17–25, 13–25); P2 Report			North Paris Arena, Paris; Attendance: 2,338; Referees: Slavisa Kuzmenovic (BIH), Philippe Dauchel (FRA)

Semifinals

5 September 2024; 20:30	China	3–0	Canada	North Paris Arena, Paris; Attendance: 2,575; Referees: Krisztina Arpas (HUN), Spela Plesnik (SLO)
5 September 2024; 20:30	(25–16, 25–22, 25–18); P2 Report			North Paris Arena, Paris; Attendance: 2,575; Referees: Krisztina Arpas (HUN), Spela Plesnik (SLO)

Bronze medal match

7 September 2024; 15:00	Canada	3–0	Brazil	North Paris Arena, Paris; Attendance: 4,054; Referees: Mirza Basic (BIH), Ayan Rakhmetov (KAZ)
7 September 2024; 15:00	(25–15, 25–18, 25–18); P2 Report			North Paris Arena, Paris; Attendance: 4,054; Referees: Mirza Basic (BIH), Ayan Rakhmetov (KAZ)

== Swimming ==
Canadian swimmers achieved quota places for the following events based on their results at the 2023 World Para Swimming Championships, and through high-performance allocation, as long as they meet the minimum entry standard (MES).

Men

Athlete	Event	Heats		Final	
Athlete	Event	Result	Rank	Result	Rank
Nicholas Bennett	200 m freestyle S14	1:54.72	1 Q	1:53.61	2nd place, silver medalist(s)
Nicholas Bennett	100 m backstroke S14	1:04.12	6	Did not advance	
Nicholas Bennett	100 m breaststroke SB14	1:05.33	2 Q	1:03.98	1st place, gold medalist(s)
Nicholas Bennett	200 m individual medley SM14	2:09.93	1 Q	2:06.05 PR	1st place, gold medalist(s)
Alec Elliot	100 m freestyle S10	55.81	5	Did not advance	
Alec Elliot	100 m backstroke S10	1:04.41	5 Q	1:04.85	7
Alec Elliot	100 m butterfly S10	59.81	3 Q	1:00.75	8
Alec Elliot	200m individual medley SM10	2:20.90	6	Did not advance	
Fernando Lu	50 m freestyle S10	25.02	8 Q	24.84	7
Fernando Lu	100 m freestyle S10	56.07	6	Did not advance	
Fernando Lu	100 m butterfly S10	1:01.05	5	Did not advance	
Fernando Lu	100 m breaststroke SB9	DSQ		Did not advance	
Fernando Lu	200 m individual medley SM10	2:22.45	6	Did not advance	
Sebastian Massabie	50 m freestyle S4	36.95 PR	1 Q	35.61 WR	1st place, gold medalist(s)
Sebastian Massabie	100 m freestyle S4	1:23.80	2 Q	1:22.53	5
Sebastian Massabie	200 m freestyle S4	3:02.28	3 Q	2:59.15	6
Reid Maxwell	100 m freestyle S8	1:00.68	6	Did not advance	
Reid Maxwell	400 m freestyle S8	4:25.95	1 Q	4:23.90 AM	2nd place, silver medalist(s)
Reid Maxwell	100 m butterfly S8	1:08.37	5	Did not advance	
Reid Maxwell	100 m backstroke S8	1:10.37	5	Did not advance	
Reid Maxwell	200 m individual medley SM8	2:31.54	5	Did not advance	
Nicolas Guy Turbide	50 m freestyle S13	24.33	3 Q	24.40	7
Philippe Vachon	400 m freestyle S8	4:39.79	6	Did not advance	

Women

Athlete	Event	Heats		Final	
Athlete	Event	Result	Rank	Result	Rank
Katie Cosgriffe	50 m freestyle S10	29.14	13	Did not advance	
Katie Cosgriffe	100 m backstroke S10	1:10.24	1 Q	1:09.56	5
Katie Cosgriffe	100 m butterfly S10	1:07.29	1 Q	1:07.22	3rd place, bronze medalist(s)
Katie Cosgriffe	200 m individual medley SM10	2:39.48	5	Did not advance	
Danielle Dorris	50 m butterfly S7	33.70	1 Q	33.62	1st place, gold medalist(s)
Danielle Dorris	200 m individual medley SM7	3:02.55	2 Q	3:04.51	6
Sabrina Duchesne	100 m freestyle S7	1:15.45	7	Did not advance	
Sabrina Duchesne	400 m freestyle S7	5:24.08	2 Q	5:24.08	6
Nikita Ens	100 m freestyle S3	2:34.14	8	Did not advance	
Nikita Ens	50 m backstroke S3	1:13.44	5	Did not advance	
Arianna Hunsicker	50 m freestyle S10	28.98	12	Did not advance	
Arianna Hunsicker	100 m freestyle S10	1:03.81	7	Did not advance	
Arianna Hunsicker	100 m backstroke S10	1:15.41	5	Did not advance	
Mary Jibb	100 m freestyle S9	1:06.01	5	Did not advance	
Mary Jibb	100 m backstroke S9	1:12.92	3 Q	1:12.33	5
Mary Jibb	100 m butterfly S9	1:12.95	4 Q	1:13.60	8
Mary Jibb	200 m individual medley SM9	2:41.99	5 Q	2:41.70	7
Shelby Newkirk	50 m freestyle S6	34.15	4 Q	34.08	4
Shelby Newkirk	100 m freestyle S7	1:15.38	6	Did not advance	
Shelby Newkirk	100 m backstroke S6	1:24.72	2	1:22.24	3rd place, bronze medalist(s)
Hannah Ouellette	200 m freestyle S5	4:03.57	19	Did not advance	
Hannah Ouellette	50 m butterfly S5	56.87	6	Did not advance	
Hannah Ouellette	200 m individual medley SM5	4:29.42	5	Did not advance	
Clemence Pare	200 m freestyle S5	3:57.42	18	Did not advance	
Clemence Pare	200 m individual medley SM5	4:28.43	6	Did not advance	
Aurelie Rivard	100 m backstroke S10	1:11.54	4 Q	1:11.05	8
Aurelie Rivard	50 m freestyle S10	27.38	2 Q	27.62	3rd place, bronze medalist(s)
Aurelie Rivard	100 m freestyle S10	1:00.41	1 Q	1:00.82	2nd place, silver medalist(s)
Aurelie Rivard	400 m freestyle S10	4:37.03	2 Q	4:29.20	1st place, gold medalist(s)
Tess Routliffe	100 m freestyle S7	1:13.92	4 Q	1:13:90	8
Tess Routliffe	100 m breaststroke SB7	1:33:18	2 Q	1:31:58	3rd place, bronze medalist(s)
Tess Routliffe	50 m butterfly S7	36.60	1 Q	36.38	4
Tess Routliffe	200 m individual medley SM7	2:59:06	1 Q	2:57:17	2nd place, silver medalist(s)
Katarina Roxon	100 m breaststroke SB8	1:26.70	3 Q	1:27.39	8
Katarina Roxon	200 m individual medley SM9	2:48.61	7	Did not advance	
Abi Tripp	400 m freestyle S8	5:24.26	5	Did not advance	
Abi Tripp	100 m breaststroke SB7	1:46.57	5	Did not advance	
Emma Van Dyk	100 m backstroke S14	1:12.19	5	Did not advance	
Aly Van Wyck-Smart	100 m freestyle S3	2:32.41	7	Did not advance	
Aly Van Wyck-Smart	50 m freestyle S3	1:15.85	6	Did not advance	

Mixed

Athlete	Event	Heats		Final	
Athlete	Event	Result	Rank	Result	Rank
Sebastian Massabie; Hannah Ouellette; Philippe Vachon; Aly Van Wyck-Smart	4x50 m freestyle relay 20pts	3:14.93	5	Did not advance	
Katie Cosgriffe; Fernando Lu; Reid Maxwell; Shelby Newkirk	4 × 100 m medley 34pts	4:46.82	5 Q	4:50.00	8

== Table tennis ==
For the first time in Paralympics Games, Peter Isherwood has qualified to compete.

Athlete	Event	Round of 32	Round of 16	Quarterfinals	Semifinals	Final / BM	
Athlete	Event	Opposition Result	Opposition Result	Opposition Result	Opposition Result	Opposition Result	Rank
Peter Isherwood	Men's individual C2	Jakimczuk (POL); L 1–3	Did not advance				17

== Wheelchair basketball ==
Summary

Team	Event	Group Stage				Quarterfinal	Semifinal	Final / BM	
Team	Event	Opposition Score	Opposition Score	Opposition Score	Rank	Opposition Score	Opposition Score	Opposition Score	Rank
Canada men's	Men's tournament	France; W 83–68	Great Britain; L 58–88	Germany; W 68–52	2 Q	Netherlands; W 79–67	United States; L 43–80	Germany; L 62–75	4
Canada women's	Women's tournament	China; L 65–70	Great Britain; W 63–54	Spain; W 81–49	2 Q	Germany; W 71–53	Netherlands; L 61–72	China; L 43–65	4

=== Men's tournament ===
Canada men's team qualified to compete by virtue of their top four result at the 2024 IWBF Men's Repechage in Antibes, France.

Team roster

The following is the Canada roster in the men's wheelchair basketball tournament of the 2024 Summer Paralympics.

Canada men's national wheelchair basketball team - 2024 Summer Paralympics roster
Players
Coaches

No.	Name	Age – Date of birth	Pts.
4	Nikola Gončin	32 – 19 December 1991	4.5
5	Garrett Ostepchuk	24 – 12 March 2000	2.0
6	Robert Hedges	44 – 5 January 1980	2.5
7	Vincent Dallaire	29 – 7 March 1995	1.5
8	Blaise Mutware	30 – 14 May 1994	3.5
9	Colin Higgins	33 – 23 May 1991	4.5
10	Lee Melymick	29 – 9 January 1995	1.0
11	Chad Jassman	40 – 16 September 1983	1.5
12	Patrick Anderson	45 – 22 August 1979	4.5
13	Jonathan Vermette	33 – 4 March 1991	1.0
14	Tyler Miller	40 – 24 June 1984	1.5
15	Reed De'Aeth	22 – 20 August 2002	4.5

Head coach

Matteo Feriani

Assistant coach(es)

Nicolas Paimer

Legend

- Age - describes age on 29 August 2024

Preliminary round

Pos	Team	Pld	W	L	PF	PA	PD	Pts	Qualification
1	Great Britain	3	3	0	249	163	+86	6	Quarter-finals
2	Canada	3	2	1	209	208	+1	5	Quarter-finals
3	Germany	3	1	2	179	208	−29	4	Quarter-finals
4	France (H)	3	0	3	182	240	−58	3	Quarter-finals

Source: Paris 2024
Rules for classification: 1) Points; 2) Head-to-head results; 3) Points difference; 4) Points scored.
(H) Hosts

30 August 2024
18:15

Report

France	68–83	Canada
Scoring by quarter: 20–26, 21–13, 13–22, 14–22
Pts: Jouanserre 38; Rebs: Bayle, Jouanserre 6 Asts: Mehiaoui 6		Pts: Higgins 38; Rebs: Anderson 12; Asts: Anderson 13

Bercy Arena, Paris
Attendance: 12.726
Referees: Krunoslav Peić

31 August 2024
12:45

Report

Canada	58–88	Great Britain
Scoring by quarter: 14–29, 19–21, 15–24, 10–14
Pts: Higgins 14; Rebs: Gončin 6 Asts: three players 3		Pts: Pratt 20; Rebs: Manning 9 Asts: Warburton, Pratt 10

Bercy Arena, Paris
Attendance: 12.761
Referees: Linas Radykas

2 September 2024
16:00

Report

Germany	52–68	Canada
Scoring by quarter: 11-16, 13-21, 18-27, 10-4
Pts: Güntner, Böhme 17; Rebs: Güntner 11; Asts: Böhme 4		Pts: Anderson 17; Rebs: Gončin 9 Asts: Higgins 6

Bercy Arena, Paris
Attendance: 8,891
Referees: Shunsuke Nikaido

Quarterfinal

3 September 2024
16:00

Report

Canada	79–67	Netherlands
Scoring by quarter: 18–19, 26–10, 21–22, 14–16
Pts: Anderson 20; Rebs: Anderson 20; Asts: Gončin 7		Pts: Op den Orth 18; Rebs: Poggenwisch 9 Asts: Poggenwisch 12

Bercy Arena, Paris
Attendance: 11.279
Referees: Shu-Fei Hsieh

Semifinal

5 September 2024
21:30

Report

United States	80–43	Canada
Scoring by quarter: 15–16, 25–16, 19–7, 21–4
Pts: Bell 31; Rebs: Bell 10; Asts: Williams 11		Pts: Anderson 16; Rebs: Anderson 6 Asts: Higgins 7

Bercy Arena, Paris
Attendance: 12.524
Referees: Linas Radykas

Bronze medal game

7 September 2024
16:00

Report

Canada	62–75	Germany
Scoring by quarter: 17–11, 18–16, 13–20, 14–28
Pts: Anderson 31; Rebs: Anderson 11; Asts: Anderson, Gončin 4		Pts: Böhme 36; Rebs: Güntner 10; Asts: three players 5

Bercy Arena, Paris
Attendance: 12.419
Referees: Krunoslav Peić

=== Women's tournament ===
Canada women's team qualified to compete by virtue of their top four result at the 2024 IWBF Women's Repechage in Osaka, Japan.

Team roster

The following is the Canada roster in the women's wheelchair basketball tournament of the 2024 Summer Paralympics.

Canada women's national wheelchair basketball team - 2024 Summer Paralympics roster
Players
Coaches

No.	Name	Age – Date of birth	Pts.
4	Rosalie Lalonde	27 – 27 March 1997	3.0
5	Elodie Tessier	28 – 14 March 1996	2.5
6	Arinn Young	28 – 10 July 1996	4.5
7	Cindy Ouellet	35 – 8 December 1988	3.5
8	Tamara Steeves	34 – 23 September 1989	1.5
10	Puisand Lai	24 – 29 July 2000	1.0
11	Tara Llanes	47 – 28 November 1976	1.5
12	Bethany Johnson	22 – 29 November 2001	4.0
13	Kady Dandeneau	34 – 25 January 1990	4.5
14	Sofia Fassi-Fehri	35 – 19 January 1989	1.0
15	Melanie Hawtin	36 – 20 July 1988	1.0
16	Desiree Isaac-Pictou	24 – 10 December 1999	4.0

Head coach

Michel Sung

Assistant coach(es)

Dylan Carter

Legend

- Age - describes age on 29 August 2024

Preliminary round

Pos	Team	Pld	W	L	PF	PA	PD	Pts	
1	China	3	3	0	196	150	+46	6	Quarter-finals
2	Canada	3	2	1	209	173	+36	5	Quarter-finals
3	Great Britain	3	1	2	170	159	+11	4	Quarter-finals
4	Spain	3	0	3	121	214	−93	3	Quarter-finals

Source: Paris 2024
Rules for classification: 1) Points; 2) Head-to-head results; 3) Points difference; 4) Points scored.

29 August 2024
18:15

Report

Canada	65–70	China
Scoring by quarter: 15–19, 18–18, 22–16, 10–17
Pts: Dandeneau 28; Rebs: Dandeneau 9 Asts: Dandeneau 7		Pts: X. Zhang 30; Rebs: X. Zhang 7 Asts: T. Zhang 12

Bercy Arena, Paris
Attendance: 12.682
Referees: Celine Villard

31 August 2024
10:30

Report

Great Britain	54–63	Canada
Scoring by quarter: 13–10, 11–19, 12–22, 18–12
Pts: Conroy 15; Rebs: Williams, Love 9 Asts: Haizelden 9		Pts: Young 26; Rebs: Young 12; Asts: Young 8

Bercy Arena, Paris
Attendance: 12.761
Referees: Adam Fronczak

1 September 2024
21:30

Report

Spain	49–81	Canada
Scoring by quarter: 14–21, 12–20, 10–18, 13–22
Pts: López 12; Rebs: Zudaire 6 Asts: Ruiz 11		Pts: Dandeneau 36; Rebs: Dandeneau 12; Asts: Dandeneau 12

Bercy Arena, Paris
Attendance: 7.329
Referees: Celine Villard

Quarterfinal

4 September 2024
21:30

Report

Canada	71–53	Germany
Scoring by quarter: 17–12, 17–10, 17–14, 20–17
Pts: Dandeneau 33; Rebs: Dandeneau 16; Asts: Young 7		Pts: Miller 18; Rebs: Miller 8 Asts: Miller 14

Bercy Arena, Paris
Attendance: 12.518
Referees: Shunsuke Nikaido

Semifinal

6 September 2024
21:30

Report

Netherlands	72–61	Canada
Scoring by quarter: 16-12, 17-23, 20-14, 19-12
Pts: Kramer 25; Rebs: Beijer 12; Asts: Kramer 9		Pts: Young 29; Rebs: Dandeneau 13; Asts: Dandeneau 10

Bercy Arena, Paris
Attendance: 12.514
Referees: Shunsuke Nikaido

Bronze medal game

8 September 2024
10:30

Report

China	65–43	Canada
Scoring by quarter: 19–11, 16–6, 16–8, 14–18
Pts: T. Zhang 16; Rebs: X. Zhang 7 Asts: Lin 12		Pts: Young 12; Rebs: Dandeneau 9 Asts: Dandeneau, Young 5

Bercy Arena, Paris
Attendance: 12.576
Referees: Yekta Koç

== Wheelchair fencing ==
Men

Athlete	Event	Round of 32	Round of 16	Repechage 1	Repechage 2	Repechage 3	Repechage 4	Quarterfinal	Semifinal	Final / BM	
Athlete	Event	Opposition Score	Opposition Score	Opposition Score	Opposition Score	Opposition Score	Opposition Score	Opposition Score	Opposition Score	Opposition Score	Rank
Ryan Rousell	Men's épée A	Manko (UKR); L 6–15	Did not advance								18
Ryan Rousell	Men's sabre A	—N/a	Manko (UKR); L 7–15	Oliveira (BRA); W 15–4	Giordan (ITA); L 5–15	Did not advance					11

Women

Athlete	Event	Round of 32	Round of 16	Repechage 1	Repechage 2	Repechage 3	Repechage 4	Quarterfinal	Semifinal	Final / BM	
Athlete	Event	Opposition Score	Opposition Score	Opposition Score	Opposition Score	Opposition Score	Opposition Score	Opposition Score	Opposition Score	Opposition Score	Rank
Ruth Sylvie Morel	Women's sabre A	Morkvych (UKR); L 1–15	Did not advance								21
Trinity Lowthian	Women's épée B	—N/a	Fedota-Isaieva (UKR); L 9–15	—N/a	Cho (KOR); W 15–7	Pasquino (ITA); W 15–13	Tong (HKG); L 14–15	Did not advance			5
Trinity Lowthian	Women's sabre B	—N/a	Cho (KOR); L 8–15	Santos (BRA); L 14–15	Did not advance						13

== Wheelchair rugby ==
Canada team has qualified to compete at the Paralympic games, by virtue of their top three highest ranked team result at the 2024 Paralympic Qualification Tournament in Wellington, New Zealand.

Summary

Team	Group Stage				Semifinal	Final / BM	
Team	Opposition Score	Opposition Score	Opposition Score	Rank	Opposition Score	Opposition Score	Rank
Canada national team	United States; L 48–51	Germany; W 54–47	Japan; L 46–50	3	Denmark; W 56–46	France; L 50–53	6

Team roster

- Cody Caldwell
- Patrice Dagenais
- Matthew Anthony Debly
- Joel Ewert
- Eric Furtado Rodrigues
- Byron Green
- Trevor Hirschfield
- Rio Kanda Kovac
- Anthony Letourneau
- Zachary Madell
- Travis Murao
- Mike Whitehead

Group stage

Pos	Team	Pld	W	D	L	GF	GA	GD	Pts	Qualification
1	Japan	3	3	0	0	150	132	+18	6	Semi-finals
2	United States	3	2	0	1	150	140	+10	4	Semi-finals
3	Canada	3	1	0	2	148	148	0	2	Playoff rounds
4	Germany	3	0	0	3	138	166	−28	0	Playoff rounds

Source: Paris 2024
29 August 2024
13:30

United States	51–48	Canada
Chuck Aoki – 21; Josh Wheeler – 11; Sarah Adam – 6 Eric Newby – 3 Josh O'Neill – 2 Chuck Melton – 1 Jeff Butler – 1 Lee Fredette – 1	Report	Zak Madell – 31; Cody Caldwell – 5 Rio Kanda Kovac – 3 Mike Whitehead – 3 Trevor Hirschfield – 3 Anthony Létourneau – 2

Grand Palais Éphémère, Paris

30 August 2024
17:30

Germany	47–54	Canada
Marco Herbst – 20; Josco Wilke – 8 Steffen Wecke – 8 Britta Kripke – 5 Michael Volter – 3 Jens Sauerbier – 2	Report	Zachary Madell – 28; Rio Kovac Kanda – 6 Anthony Letourneau – 5 Matthew Debly – 4 Mike Whitehead – 4 Patrice Dagenais – 2 Cody Caldwell – 2 Joel Ewert – 2 Eric Rodrigues Furtado – 1 Trevor Hirschfield – 1

Grand Palais Éphémère, Paris

31 August 2024
17:30

Canada	46–50	Japan
Zachary Madell – 27; Rio Kovac Kanda – 7 Anthony Letourneau – 5 Cody Caldwell – 5 Trevor Hirschfield – 1	Report	Yukinobu Ike – 15; Daisuke Ikezaki – 14; Katsuya Hashimoto – 11; Shunya Nakamachi – 5 Seiya Norimatsu – 2 Ryuji Kusaba – 1

Grand Palais Éphémère, Paris

5th to 8th Semifinals

1 September 2024
11:30

Canada	56–46	Denmark
Zachary Madell – 27; Travis Murao – 7 Anthony Letourneau – 7 Cody Caldwell – 5 Rio Kovac Kanda – 2 Joel Ewert – 2 Matthew Debly – 2 Trevor Hirschfield – 1 Patrice Dagenais – 1	Report	Sebastian Frederiksen – 13; Morten Elmholt – 8 Leon Jorgensen – 8 Mark Peters – 7 Kaare Nielsen Momme – 5 Jesper Krueger – 2 Jakob Mortensen – 1 Mikkel Schottel – 1 Kristian Eriksen Bak – 1

Grand Palais Éphémère, Paris

Fifth place final

2 September 2024
17:30

Canada	50–53	France
Zachary Madell – 35; Cody Caldwell – 3 Trevor Hirschfield – 3 Anthony Letourneau – 1 Patrice Dagenais – 1 Mike Whitehead – 1	Report	Jonathan Hivernat – 25; Sebastien Verdin – 21; Corentin Guen – 1

Grand Palais Éphémère, Paris

== Wheelchair tennis ==
Robert Shaw has qualified to compete.

Quad

Athlete	Event	Round of 64	Round of 32	Round of 16	Quarterfinals	Semifinals	Final / BM	
Athlete	Event	Opposition Score	Opposition Score	Opposition Score	Opposition Score	Opposition Score	Opposition Score	Rank
Robert Shaw	Singles	—N/a		Silva (BRA); W 6–2, 6–1	Vink (NED); L 0–6, 0–6	Did not advance		=5

== See also ==
- Canada at the 2023 Parapan American Games
- Canada at the 2024 Summer Olympics
