= Gilda Guadalupe Cota Vera =

Mexican Paralympic athlete (born 1989)

Personal information
- Nationality: Mexican
- Born: 10 September 1989 (age 37)

Sport
- Country: Mexico
- Sport: Para-athletics
- Disability class: F33
- Event: shot put
Medal record
Women's para-athletics
Representing Mexico
Paralympic Games
Silver medal – second place	2024 Paris	Shot put F33
World Championships
Gold medal – first place	2024 Kobe	Shot put F33

Gilda Guadalupe Cota Vera (born 10 September 1989) is a Mexican para-athlete specializing in shot put. She represented Mexico at the 2024 Summer Paralympics.

== Career ==
In May 2024, she competed at the 2024 World Para Athletics Championships and won a gold medal in the shot put F33 event with an Americas record throw of 7.77 metres. She then represented Mexico at the 2024 Summer Paralympics and won a silver medal in the shot put F33 event.
