= Roman Zhdanov =

Russian Paralympic swimmer

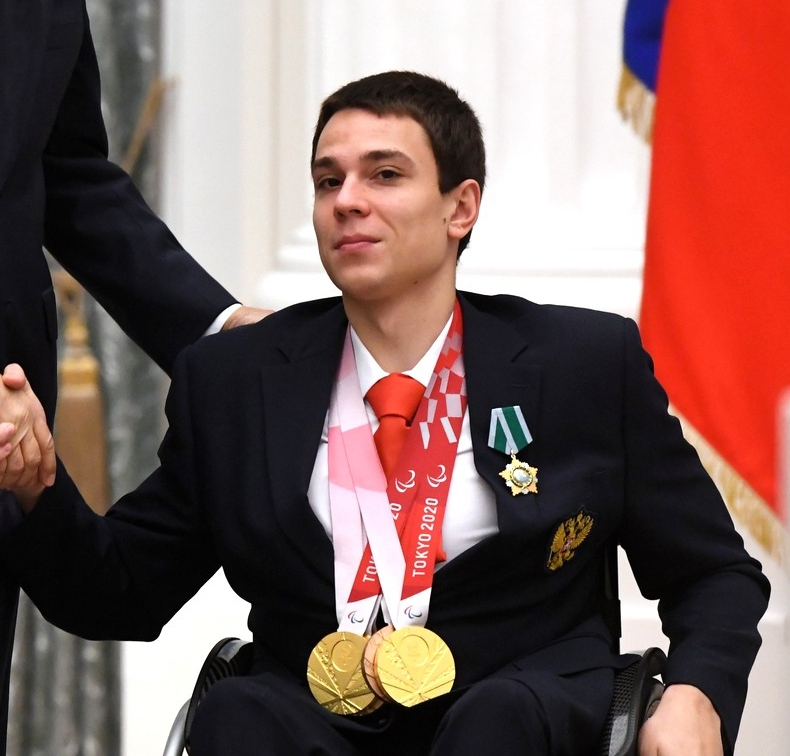

Personal information
- Full name: Roman Sergeyevich Zhdanov
- Born: 30 June 1998 (age 28) Gorno-Altaysk, Russia

Sport
- Country: Russia
- Sport: Paralympic swimming
- Disability class: S4, SB3
- Club: Zarya Sports Complex
- Coached by: Elena Sokolova
Medal record
Paralympic swimming
Representing Russia
Paralympic Games
Gold medal – first place	2020 Tokyo	50 m breaststroke SB3
Gold medal – first place	2020 Tokyo	50 m backstroke S4
Gold medal – first place	2020 Tokyo	150 m ind. medley SM4
Bronze medal – third place	2020 Tokyo	100 m freestyle S4
Bronze medal – third place	2020 Tokyo	200 m freestyle S4
World Championships
Gold medal – first place	2015 Glasgow	50 m backstroke S4
Gold medal – first place	2015 Glasgow	150 m ind. medley SM4
Gold medal – first place	2019 London	100 m freestyle S4
Gold medal – first place	2019 London	150 m ind. medley SM4
Gold medal – first place	2019 London	200 m freestyle S4
Silver medal – second place	2015 Glasgow	100 m freestyle S4
Silver medal – second place	2015 Glasgow	200 m freestyle S4
Bronze medal – third place	2015 Glasgow	mixed 4 × 50 metre freestyle relay
Bronze medal – third place	2019 London	50 m freestyle S4
Bronze medal – third place	2019 London	50 m backstroke S4
Bronze medal – third place	2019 London	50 m breaststroke S4
Bronze medal – third place	2019 London	mixed 4x50 m freestyle relay
European Championships
Gold medal – first place	2020 Funchal	50 m breaststroke SB3
Gold medal – first place	2026 Kocaeli	50 m backstroke S4
Gold medal – first place	2026 Kocaeli	4 × 50 m medley relay
Silver medal – second place	2020 Funchal	100 m freestyle S4
Silver medal – second place	2026 Kocaeli	50 m freestyle S4
Silver medal – second place	2026 Kocaeli	100 m freestyle S4
Bronze medal – third place	2014 Eindhoven	50 m backstroke S5
Bronze medal – third place	2014 Eindhoven	200 m ind. medley SM5
Bronze medal – third place	2014 Eindhoven	4 × 50 m freestyle relay
Bronze medal – third place	2014 Eindhoven	4 × 50 m medley relay
Bronze medal – third place	2020 Funchal	50 m freestyle S4
Representing Neutral Paralympic Athletes
Paralympic Games
Gold medal – first place	2024 Paris	50 m backstroke S4
Gold medal – first place	2024 Paris	150 m ind. medley SM4
Silver medal – second place	2024 Paris	200 m freestyle S4
World Championships
Gold medal – first place	2025 Singapore	150 m ind. medley SM4
Gold medal – first place	2025 Singapore	50 m backstroke S4
Bronze medal – third place	2025 Singapore	200 m freestyle S4
European Championships
Gold medal – first place	2024 Funchal	50 m backstroke S4
Gold medal – first place	2024 Funchal	150 m ind. medley SM4
Silver medal – second place	2024 Funchal	200 m freestyle S4
Bronze medal – third place	2024 Funchal	50 m freestyle S4
Bronze medal – third place	2024 Funchal	100 m freestyle S4

Roman Sergeyevich Zhdanov (Russian: Роман Сергеевич Жданов; born 30 June 1998) is a Russian para swimmer. He is a five-time Paralympic champion and seven-time World champion.

== Career ==
Zhdanov started swimming at the age of 14 and broke into professional sports in 2013. The next year, he went to the 2014 IPC Swimming European Championships in Eindhoven. Zhdanov won four bronze medals, participating in the 50 metre backstroke, 200 metre medley and two 4 x 50m freestyle and medley relay events.

Zhdanov represented Russian Paralympic Committee athletes at the 2020 Summer Paralympics, where he won gold medals in the 50 metre breaststroke SB3, 50 metre backstroke S4, and 150 metre individual medley SM4, setting three world records.

He represented Neutral Paralympic Athletes at the 2024 Summer Paralympics and won gold medals in the 50 metre backstroke S4 and 150 metre individual medley SM4 events. He also won a silver medal in the 200 metre freestyle S4 event.

== Personal life ==
Zhdanov was born to Natalya and Alexander Zhdanov. He was born with a lesion of the musculoskeletal system. He has a younger brother named Danil.
