= Ángel de Jesús Camacho Ramírez =

Mexican Paralympic swimmer (born 2004)

Ángel de Jesús Camacho
Personal information
- Full name: Ángel de Jesús Camacho Ramírez
- Nationality: Mexican
- Born: 28 December 2004 (age 21) León, Guanajuato

Sport
- Country: Mexico
- Sport: Paralympic swimming
- Disability: Hanhart syndrome
- Disability class: S4
Medal record
Men's swimming
Representing Mexico
Paralympic Games
Silver medal – second place	2024 Paris	50 m backstroke S4
Bronze medal – third place	2020 Tokyo	50 m backstroke S4
Bronze medal – third place	2024 Paris	100 m freestyle S4
Bronze medal – third place	2024 Paris	150 m ind. medley SM4
World Championships
Silver medal – second place	2023 Manchester	50 m backstroke S4
Silver medal – second place	2023 Manchester	200 m freestyle S4
Bronze medal – third place	2022 Madeira	50 m backstroke S4
Bronze medal – third place	2022 Madeira	200 m freestyle S4
Bronze medal – third place	2023 Manchester	150 m ind. medley SM4
Bronze medal – third place	2025 Singapore	150 m ind. medley SM4
Parapan American Games
Gold medal – first place	2023 Santiago	50 m backstroke S4
Gold medal – first place	2023 Santiago	150 m ind. medley SM4

Ángel de Jesús Camacho Ramírez (born 28 December 2004) is a Mexican Paralympic swimmer.

== Early life ==
Camacho Ramírez was born in León, Guanajuato on 28 December 2004. He studies graphic design at the National College of Professional Technical Education technical high school. He started swimming in 2018 after a swimmer with disabilities advised his father to try it.

== Career ==
He represented Mexico at the 2020 Summer Paralympics, where he won a bronze medal in the 50 meters backstroke S4 event. He also earned two bronze medals at the 2022 World Para Swimming Championships.
