= Andreas Ernhofer =

Austrian Paralympic swimmer (born 1997)

- Ernhofer in 2020

Personal information
- Nationality: Austrian
- Born: 9 March 1997 (age 29) Mödling, Austria

Sport
- Sport: Para swimming
- Disability class: S4, SM4, SB3
Medal record
Men's para swimming
Representing Austria
World Championships
Silver medal – second place	2022 Madeira	150 m ind. medley SM4
European Championships
Gold medal – first place	2026 Kocaeli	50 m breaststroke SB3
Gold medal – first place	2026 Kocaeli	50 m freestyle S4
Gold medal – first place	2026 Kocaeli	100 m freestyle S4
Bronze medal – third place	2020 Funchal	50 m breaststroke SB3
Bronze medal – third place	2024 Funchal	150 m ind. medley SM4
Bronze medal – third place	2026 Kocaeli	50 m backstroke S4

Andreas Ernhofer (born 9 March 1997) is an Austrian Paralympic swimmer. He represented Austria at the 2020 and 2024 Summer Paralympics.

== Career ==
Ernhofer represented Austria at the 2020 Summer Paralympics. He again represented Austria at the 2024 Summer Paralympics. He originally planned to make six starts at the Paralympics, however, he only competed in three disciplines due to illness.

In June 2022, he competed at the 2022 World Para Swimming Championships and won a silver medal in the 150 metre individual medley SM4 event.

In September 2026, he competed at the 2026 World Para Swimming European Championships and won a gold medal in the 50 metre breaststroke SB3 event.

== Personal life ==
On 16 August 2014, Ernhofer was involved in a swimming accident at Lake Steinbrunn and broke three vertebrae in his neck while diving. As a result, he became a paraplegic.

He volunteers as the deputy administrator for public relations for his local fire department.
