= Dimitri Granjux =

French Paralympic swimmer (born 2005)

- Granjux at the 2024 Summer Paralympics

Personal information
- Nationality: French
- Born: 11 October 2005 (age 20) Haute-Savoie, France

Sport
- Sport: Para swimming
- Disability class: S3, SB3, SM3
Medal record
Men's para swimming
Representing France
European Championships
Gold medal – first place	2024 Funchal	50 m freestyle S4
Gold medal – first place	2024 Funchal	200 m freestyle S4
Gold medal – first place	2024 Funchal	150 m ind. medley SM3
Gold medal – first place	2026 Kocaeli	100 m freestyle S3
Gold medal – first place	2026 Kocaeli	150 m ind. medley SM3
Bronze medal – third place	2024 Funchal	50 m backstroke S3
Bronze medal – third place	2026 Kocaeli	50 m breaststroke SB3

Dimitri Granjux (born 11 October 2005) is a French para swimmer. He represented France at the 2024 Summer Paralympics.

== Early life ==
Granjux was born with a congenital neuropathy causing generalized muscle weakness and began para-swimming in 2016.

== Career ==
In April 2024, Granjux competed at the 2024 World Para Swimming European Open Championships and won gold medals in the 50 metre freestyle S3, 200 metre freestyle S3, and 150 metre individual medley SM3 events. He also won a bronze medal in the 50 metre backstroke S3 event. In June 2024, he was selected to represent France at the 2024 Summer Paralympics. His best finish was fifth place in the 150 metre individual medley SM4 event.

In September 2026, he competed at the 2026 World Para Swimming European Championships and won gold medals in the 100 metre freestyle S3 and 150 metre Individual medley SM3 events. He also won a bronze medal in the 50 metre breaststroke SB3 event.
