= Swimming at the 2020 Summer Paralympics – Men's 50 metre backstroke S3 =

Men's 50 metre backstroke S3 at the XVI Paralympic Games
- Venue: Tokyo Aquatics Centre
- Dates: 29 August 2021
- Competitors: 12 from 9 nations
- Winning time: 45.25

Medalists
1st place, gold medalist(s)		Zou Liankang	China
2nd place, silver medalist(s)		Denys Ostapchenko	Ukraine
3rd place, bronze medalist(s)		Diego López Díaz	Mexico

The Men's 50 metre backstroke S3 event at the 2020 Paralympic Games took place on 29 August 2021, at the Tokyo Aquatics Centre.

== Heats ==
The swimmers with the top eight times, regardless of heat, advanced to the final.

Rank	Heat	Lane	Name	Nationality	Time	Notes
1	2	4	Diego López Díaz	Mexico	45.67	Q
2	1	5	Denys Ostapchenko	Ukraine	46.18	Q
3	2	5	Zou Liankang	China	47.86	Q
4	2	3	Vincenzo Boni	Italy	48.04	Q
5	1	4	Jesús Hernández Hernández	Mexico	49.19	Q
6	2	6	Josia Tim Alexander Topf	Germany	49.78	Q
7	1	3	Serhii Palamarchuk	Ukraine	49.88	Q
8	1	6	Miguel Ángel Martínez Tajuelo	Spain	54.88	Q
9	1	2	Aleksandr Beliaev	RPC	55.52	
10	2	2	Charkorn Kaewsri	Thailand	57.81	
11	2	7	Grant Patterson	Australia	58.15	OC
12	1	7	Emmanuele Marigliano	Italy	1:03.64	

== Final ==
Rank	Lane	Name	Nationality	Time	Notes
1st place, gold medalist(s)	3	Zou Liankang	China	45.25	
2nd place, silver medalist(s)	5	Denys Ostapchenko	Ukraine	45.57	
3rd place, bronze medalist(s)	4	Diego López Díaz	Mexico	45.66	
4	2	Jesús Hernández Hernández	Mexico	45.75	
5	6	Vincenzo Boni	Italy	47.88	
6	1	Serhii Palamarchuk	Ukraine	49.65	
7	7	Josia Tim Alexander Topf	Germany	49.99	
8	8	Miguel Ángel Martínez Tajuelo	Spain	54.57	
