= Swimming at the 2020 Summer Paralympics – Men's 150 metre individual medley =

The men's 150 metre individual medley swimming events for the 2020 Summer Paralympics took place at the Tokyo Aquatics Centre on August 28, 2021. Athletes swim three 50 metre laps using the backstroke, breaststroke, and freestyle. A total of two events were contested over this distance.

== Medal summary ==
The following is a summary of the medals awarded across all 150 metre individual medley events.

Classification	Gold		Silver		Bronze	
SM3	Jesús Hernández; Mexico	2:56.99	Ahmed Kelly; Australia	3:02.23	Grant Patterson; Australia	3:05.57
SM4	Roman Zhdanov; RPC	2:21.17 WR	Ami Omer Dadaon; Israel	2:29.48	Takayuki Suzuki; Japan	2:40.53

== Results ==
The following were the results of the finals only of each of the Men's 150 metre individual medley events in each of the classifications. Further details of each event, including where appropriate heats and semi finals results, are available on that event's dedicated page.

=== SM3 ===
The SM3 category is for swimmers who have leg or arm amputations, have severe coordination problems in their limbs, or have to swim with their arms but don't use their trunk or legs.

The final in this classification took place on 28 August 2021:

Rank	Lane	Name	Nationality	Time	Notes
1st place, gold medalist(s)	3	Jesús Hernández Hernández	Mexico	2:56.99	
2nd place, silver medalist(s)	5	Ahmed Kelly	Australia	3:02.23	
3rd place, bronze medalist(s)	4	Grant Patterson	Australia	3:05.57	
4	2	Diego López Díaz	Mexico	3:15.84	
5	7	Arnulfo Castorena	Mexico	3:17.44	
6	6	Josia Tim Alexander Topf	Germany	3:20.35	
7	1	Emmanuele Marigliano	Italy	3:28.43	
8	8	Ioannis Kostakis	Greece	3:43.75	

=== SM4 ===
The SM4 category is for swimmers who have function in their hands and arms but can't use their trunk or legs to swim, or they have three amputated limbs.

The final in this classification took place on 28 August 2021:

Rank	Lane	Name	Nationality	Time	Notes
1st place, gold medalist(s)	4	Roman Zhdanov	RPC	2:21.17	WR
2nd place, silver medalist(s)	5	Ami Omer Dadaon	Israel	2:29.48	
3rd place, bronze medalist(s)	3	Takayuki Suzuki	Japan	2:40.53	
4	6	Miguel Luque	Spain	2:45.78	
5	2	Dmytro Vynohradets	Ukraine	2:46.31	
6	7	Xavier Torres	Spain	2:47.74	
7	1	Efrem Morelli	Italy	2:48.63	
-	8	Liu Benying	China	DSQ	
