= Swimming at the 2020 Summer Paralympics – Men's 200 metre freestyle S3 =

Men's 200 metre freestyle S3 at the XVI Paralympic Games
- Venue: Tokyo Aquatics Centre
- Dates: 3 September 2021
- Competitors: 13 from 10 nations

Medalists
1st place, gold medalist(s)		Denys Ostapchenko	Ukraine
2nd place, silver medalist(s)		Diego López Díaz	Mexico
3rd place, bronze medalist(s)		Jesús Hernández Hernández	Mexico

The men's 200 metre freestyle S3 event at the 2020 Paralympic Games took place on 3 September 2021, at the Tokyo Aquatics Centre.

== Heats ==
The swimmers with the top eight times, regardless of heat, advanced to the final.

Rank	Heat	Lane	Name	Nationality	Time	Notes
1	1	4	Denys Ostapchenko	Ukraine	3:27.49	Q
2	1	5	Zou Liankang	China	3:30.85	Q
3	2	5	Jesús Hernández Hernández	Mexico	3:31.06	Q
4	2	4	Diego López Díaz	Mexico	3:32.97	Q
5	2	3	Vincenzo Boni	Italy	3:33.79	Q
6	1	3	Miguel Ángel Martínez	Spain	3:51.62	Q
7	2	6	Serhii Palamarchuk	Ukraine	3:52.06	Q
8	1	6	Josia Tim Alexander Topf	Germany	3:53.38	Q
9	2	2	Grant Patterson	Australia	3:57.24	
10	1	7	Aleksandr Beliaev	RPC	4:20.29	
11	2	7	Yurii Dvorskyi	Ukraine	4:23.73	
12	1	2	Ioannis Kostakis	Greece	4:31.22	
13	2	1	Youssef Elsayed	Egypt	4:46.78	

== Final ==
200m freestyle final
Rank	Lane	Name	Nationality	Time	Notes
1st place, gold medalist(s)	4	Denys Ostapchenko	Ukraine	3:21.62	
2nd place, silver medalist(s)	6	Diego López Díaz	Mexico	3:23.57	
3rd place, bronze medalist(s)	3	Jesús Hernández Hernández	Mexico	3:23.93	
4	5	Zou Liankang	China	3:24.29	
5	2	Vincenzo Boni	Italy	3:32.40	
6	8	Josia Tim Alexander Topf	Germany	3:49.44	
7	7	Miguel Ángel Martínez	Spain	3:53.44	
8	1	Serhii Palamarchuk	Ukraine	3:53.51	
