= Swimming at the 2020 Summer Paralympics – Men's 150 metre individual medley SM3 =

Men's 150 metre individual medley SM3 at the XVI Paralympic Games
- Venue: Tokyo Aquatics Centre
- Dates: 28 August 2021
- Competitors: 13 from 10 nations

Medalists
1st place, gold medalist(s)		Jesús Hernández Hernández	Mexico
2nd place, silver medalist(s)		Ahmed Kelly	Australia
3rd place, bronze medalist(s)		Grant Patterson	Australia

The Men's 150 metre individual medley SM3 event at the 2020 Paralympic Games took place on 28 August 2021, at the Tokyo Aquatics Centre.

== Heats ==
The swimmers with the top eight times, regardless of heat, advanced to the final.

Rank	Heat	Lane	Name	Nationality	Time	Notes
1	1	5	Grant Patterson	Australia	3:06.36	
2	1	4	Ahmed Kelly	Australia	3:06.72	
3	2	5	Jesús Hernández Hernández	Mexico	3:13.08	
4	1	3	Josia Topf	Germany	3:16.91	
5	2	4	Diego López Díaz	Mexico	3:18.54	
6	2	3	Arnulfo Castorena	Mexico	3:22.05	
7	2	6	Emmanuele Marigliano	Italy	3:29.51	
8	1	6	Ioannis Kostakis	Greece	3:45.53	
9	2	2	Charkorn Kaewsri	Thailand	3:47.52	
10	1	2	Yurii Dvorskyi	Ukraine	4:09.11	
11	2	7	Youssef Elsayed	Egypt	4:17.93	
12	1	7	Iyad Shalabi	Israel	4:52.88	
13	2	1	Aliaksei Talai	Belarus	5:06.04	

== Final ==
Men's 150 metre individual medley final
Rank	Name	Nationality	Time	Notes
1st place, gold medalist(s)	Jesús Hernández Hernández	Mexico	2:56.99	
2nd place, silver medalist(s)	Ahmed Kelly	Australia	3:02.23	
3rd place, bronze medalist(s)	Grant Patterson	Australia	3:05.57	
4	Diego López Díaz	Mexico	3:15.84	
5	Arnulfo Castorena	Mexico	3:17.44	
6	Josia Topf	Germany	3:20.35	
7	Emmanuele Marigliano	Italy	3:28.43	
8	Ioannis Kostakis	Greece	3:43.75	
