= Swimming at the 2020 Summer Paralympics – Men's 50 metre freestyle S3 =

Men's 50 metre freestyle S3 at the XVI Paralympic Games
- Venue: Tokyo Aquatics Centre
- Dates: 2 September 2021
- Competitors: 16 from 12 nations

Medalists
1st place, gold medalist(s)		Diego López Díaz	Mexico
2nd place, silver medalist(s)		Zou Liankang	China
3rd place, bronze medalist(s)		Denys Ostapchenko	Ukraine

The men's 50 metre freestyle S3 event at the 2020 Paralympic Games took place on 2 September 2021, at the Tokyo Aquatics Centre.

== Heats ==
The swimmers with the top eight times, regardless of heat, advanced to the final.

Rank	Heat	Lane	Name	Nationality	Time	Notes
1	1	3	Josia Topf	Germany	46.48	Q
2	1	5	Denys Ostapchenko	Ukraine	46.73	Q
3	2	4	Diego López Díaz	Mexico	47.34	Q
4	2	5	Jesús Hernández Hernández	Mexico	47.43	Q
5	1	4	Zou Liankang	China	47.49	Q
6	2	3	Serhii Palamarchuk	Ukraine	48.17	Q
7	2	6	Vincenzo Boni	Italy	49.78	Q
8	1	6	Miguel Angel Martinez Tajuelo	Spain	54.09	Q
9	2	2	Grant Patterson	Australia	54.49	
10	1	2	Charkorn Kaewsri	Thailand	55.61	
11	1	1	Emmanuele Marigliano	Italy	58.80	
12	2	1	Yurii Dvorskyi	Ukraine	59.79	
13	1	8	Ioannis Kostakis	Greece	1:00.67	
14	1	8	Bruno Becker	Brazil	1:01.30	
15	2	8	Youssef Elsayed	Egypt	1:03.46	
	1	7	Aleksandr Beliaev	RPC	DNS	

== Final ==
50m freestyle final
Rank	Lane	Name	Nationality	Time	Notes
1st place, gold medalist(s)	3	Diego López Díaz	Mexico	44.66	
2nd place, silver medalist(s)	2	Zou Liankang	China	45.25	
3rd place, bronze medalist(s)	5	Denys Ostapchenko	Ukraine	45.95	
4	6	Jesús Hernández Hernández	Mexico	46.19	
5	4	Josia Topf	Germany	47.09	
6	7	Serhii Palamarchuk	Ukraine	47.61	
7	1	Vincenzo Boni	Italy	47.68	
8	8	Miguel Angel Martinez Tajuelo	Spain	54.99	
