= Swimming at the 2020 Summer Paralympics – Men's 50 metre breaststroke =

The Men's 50 metre breaststroke swimming events for the 2020 Summer Paralympics took place at the Tokyo Aquatics Centre from August 25 to August 31, 2021. A total of 2 events were contested over this distance.

== Schedule ==
H	Heats	F	Final

Date	Wed 25		Thu 26		Fri 27		Sat 28		Sun 29		Mon 30		Tue 31	
Event	M	E	M	E	M	E	M	E	M	E	M	E	M	E
SB2 50m													H	F
SB3 50m	H	F												

== Medal summary ==
The following is a summary of the medals awarded across all 50 metre breaststroke events.

Classification	Gold		Silver		Bronze	
SB2	Arnulfo Castorena; Mexico	59.25	Grant Patterson; Australia	1:01.79	Jesús Hernández Hernández; Mexico	1:02.27
SB3	Roman Zhdanov; RPC	46.49 WR	Miguel Luque; Spain	49.08	Takayuki Suzuki; Japan	49.32

== Results ==
The following were the results of the finals only of each of the Men's 50 metre breaststroke events in each of the classifications. Further details of each event, including where appropriate heats and semi finals results, are available on that event's dedicated page.

=== SB2 ===
The SB2 category is for swimmers who have leg or arm amputations, have severe coordination problems in their limbs, or have to swim with their arms but don't use their trunk or legs.

The final in this classification took place on 31 August 2021:

Rank	Lane	Name	Nationality	Time	Notes
1st place, gold medalist(s)	4	Arnulfo Castorena	Mexico	59.25	
2nd place, silver medalist(s)	5	Grant Patterson	Australia	1:01.79	
3rd place, bronze medalist(s)	3	Jesus Hernandez Hernandez	Mexico	1:02.27	
4	6	Christopher Tronco	Mexico	1:04.46	
5	7	Emmanuele Marigliano	Italy	1:08.55	
6	2	Ioannis Kostakis	Greece	1:08.73	
7	1	Aliaksei Talai	Belarus	1:23.16	PR
8	8	Patricio Tse Anibal Lopez Fernandez	Dominican Republic	1:41.29	

=== SB3 ===
The SB3 category is for swimmers who have function in their hands and arms but can't use their trunk or legs to swim, or they have three amputated limbs.

The final in this classification took place on 25 August 2021:

Rank	Lane	Name	Nationality	Time	Notes
1st place, gold medalist(s)	3	Roman Zhdanov	RPC	46.49	WR
2nd place, silver medalist(s)	5	Miguel Luque Ávila	Spain	49.08	
3rd place, bronze medalist(s)	2	Tatayuki Suzuki	Japan	49.32	
4	4	Efrem Morelli	Italy	49.42	
5	6	Maksim Emelianov	RPC	50.63	
6	7	Jo Giseong	South Korea	51.58	
7	8	Ahmed Kelly	Australia	54.89	
8	1	Andreas Ernhofer	Austria	55.00	
