= Swimming at the 2020 Summer Paralympics – Men's 50 metre breaststroke SB2 =

Men's 50 metre breaststroke SB2 at the XVI Paralympic Games
- Venue: Tokyo Aquatics Centre
- Dates: 31 August 2021
- Competitors: 13 from 10 nations

Medalists
1st place, gold medalist(s)		José Arnulfo Castorena	Mexico
2nd place, silver medalist(s)		Grant Patterson	Australia
3rd place, bronze medalist(s)		Jesús Hernández Hernández	Mexico

The men's 50 metre breaststroke SB2 event at the 2020 Paralympic Games took place on 31 August 2021, at the Tokyo Aquatics Centre.

== Heats ==
The swimmers with the top eight times, regardless of heat, advanced to the final.

Rank	Heat	Lane	Name	Nationality	Time	Notes
1	2	4	José Arnulfo Castorena	Mexico	59.04	Q
2	1	4	Grant Patterson	Australia	1:02.04	Q
3	2	5	Jesús Hernández Hernández	Mexico	1:02.07	Q
4	1	5	Christopher Tronco	Mexico	1:05.18	Q
5	2	3	Ioannis Kostakis	Greece	1:08.85	Q
6	2	6	Emmanuele Marigliano	Italy	1:09.01	Q
7	1	6	Aliaksei Talai	Belarus	1:24.86	Q
8	1	2	Patricio Tse Anibal Lopez Fernandez	Dominican Republic	1:41.18	Q
9	1	7	Yurii Dvorskyi	Ukraine	1:44.56	
10	2	2	Bruno Becker	Brazil	1:48.10	
	2	7	José Montilla Vera	Venezuela	DNS	
	1	3	Charkorn Kaewsri	Thailand	DSQ	
	2	1	Zou Liankang	China	DSQ	

== Final ==
50m breaststroke final
Rank	Lane	Name	Nationality	Time	Notes
1st place, gold medalist(s)	4	Arnulfo Castorena	Mexico	59.25	
2nd place, silver medalist(s)	5	Grant Patterson	Australia	1:01.79	
3rd place, bronze medalist(s)	3	Jesús Hernández Hernández	Mexico	1:02.27	
4	6	Christopher Tronco	Mexico	1:04.46	
5	7	Emmanuele Marigliano	Italy	1:08.55	
6	2	Ioannis Kostakis	Greece	1:08.73	
7	1	Aliaksei Talai	Belarus	1:23.16	PR
8	8	Patricio Tse Anibal Lopez Fernandez	Dominican Republic	1:41.29	
