= Swimming at the 2020 Summer Paralympics – Men's 200 metre freestyle =

The Men's 200 metre freestyle swimming events for the 2020 Summer Paralympics took place at the Tokyo Aquatics Centre from August 25 to September 3, 2021. A total of five events were contested over this distance.

== Schedule ==
H	Heats	½	Semifinals	F	Final

Date	Wed 25		Thu 26		Fri 27		Sat 28		Sun 29		Mon 30		Tue 31		Wed 1		Thu 2		Fri 3	
Event	M	E	M	E	M	E	M	E	M	E	M	E	M	E	M	E	M	E	M	E
S2 200m									H	F										
S3 200m																			H	F
S4 200m											H	F								
S5 200m	H	F																		
S14 200m					H	F														

== Medal summary ==
The following is a summary of the medals awarded across all 200 metre freestyle events.

Classification	Gold		Silver		Bronze	
S2	Gabriel Araújo; Brazil	4:06.52	Alberto Abarza; Chile	4:14.17	Vladimir Danilenko; RPC	4:15.95
S3	Denys Ostapchenko; Ukraine	3:21.62	Diego López Díaz; Mexico	3:23.57	Jesús Hernández Hernández; Mexico	3:23.93
S4	Ami Omer Dadaon; Israel	2:44.84 WR	Takayuki Suzuki; Japan	2:55.15	Roman Zhdanov; RPC	2:58.48
S5	Francesco Bocciardo; Italy	2:26.76 PR	Antoni Ponce; Spain	2:35.20	Daniel Dias; Brazil	2:38.61
S14	Reece Dunn; Great Britain	1:52.40 WR	Gabriel Bandeira; Brazil	1:52.74	Viacheslav Emeliantsev; RPC	1:55.58

== Results ==
The following were the results of the finals only of each of the Men's 200 metre freestyle events in each of the classifications. Further details of each event, including where appropriate heats and semi finals results, are available on that event's dedicated page.

=== S2 ===
The S2 category is for swimmers who may have limited function in their hands, trunk and legs and mainly rely on their arms to swim.

The final in this classification took place on 29 August 2021:

Rank	Lane	Name	Nationality	Time	Notes
1st place, gold medalist(s)	3	Gabriel Araújo	Brazil	4:06.52	AM
2nd place, silver medalist(s)	5	Alberto Abarza	Chile	4:14.17	
3rd place, bronze medalist(s)	4	Vladimir Danilenko	RPC	4:15.95	
4	6	Bruno Becker da Silva	Brazil	4:22.63	
5	2	Kamil Otowski	Poland	4:37.06	
6	7	Roman Bondarenko	Ukraine	4:38.40	
7	1	Aristeidis Makrodimitris	Greece	4:44.53	
8	8	Cristopher Tronco	Mexico	5:08.34	

=== S3 ===
The S3 category is for swimmers who have leg or arm amputations, have severe coordination problems in their limbs, or have to swim with their arms but don't use their trunk or legs.

The final in this classification took place on 3 September 2021:

Rank	Lane	Name	Nationality	Time	Notes
1st place, gold medalist(s)	4	Denys Ostapchenko	Ukraine	3:21.62	
2nd place, silver medalist(s)	6	Diego López Díaz	Mexico	3:23.57	
3rd place, bronze medalist(s)	3	Jesús Hernández Hernández	Mexico	3:23.93	
4	5	Zou Liankang	China	3:24.29	
5	2	Vincenzo Boni	Italy	3:32.40	
6	8	Josia Tim Alexander Topf	Germany	3:49.44	
7	7	Miguel Ángel Martínez Tajuelo	Spain	3:53.44	
8	1	Serhii Palamarchuk	Ukraine	3:53.51	

=== S4 ===
The S4 category is for swimmers who have function in their hands and arms but can't use their trunk or legs to swim, or they have three amputated limbs.

The final in this classification took place on 30 August 2021:

Rank	Lane	Name	Nationality	Time	Notes
1st place, gold medalist(s)	4	Ami Omer Dadaon	Israel	2:44.84	WR
2nd place, silver medalist(s)	5	Takayuki Suzuki	Japan	2:55.15	
3rd place, bronze medalist(s)	2	Roman Zhdanov	RPC	2:58.48	
4	6	Luigi Beggiato	Italy	3:00.85	
5	3	Ángel de Jesús Camacho Ramírez	Mexico	3:01.50	
6	7	Gustavo Sánchez Martínez	Mexico	3:09.78	
7	1	Jo Giseong	South Korea	3:13.81	
8	8	David Smetanine	France	3:14.81	

=== S5 ===
The S5 category is for swimmers who have hemiplegia, paraplegia or short stature.

The final in this classification took place on 25 August 2021:

Rank	Lane	Name	Nationality	Time	Notes
1st place, gold medalist(s)	5	Francesco Bocciardo	Italy	2:26.76	PR
2nd place, silver medalist(s)	4	Antoni Ponce Bertran	Spain	2:35.20	
3rd place, bronze medalist(s)	3	Daniel Dias	Brazil	2:38.61	
4	6	Luis Huerta Poza	Spain	2:44.71	
5	2	Koral Berkin Kutlu	Turkey	2:46.62	
6	1	Artur Kubasov	RPC	2:49.67	
7	7	Dmitrii Cherniaev	RPC	2:51.91	
8	8	Sebastián Rodríguez Veloso	Spain	2:52.12	

=== S14 ===
The S14 category is for swimmers who have an intellectual impairment.

The final in this classification took place on 27 August 2021:

Rank	Lane	Name	Nationality	Time	Notes
1st place, gold medalist(s)	5	Reece Dunn	Great Britain	1:52.40	WR
2nd place, silver medalist(s)	3	Gabriel Bandeira	Brazil	1:52.74	
3rd place, bronze medalist(s)	6	Viacheslav Emeliantsev	RPC	1:55.58	
4	2	Liam Schluter	Australia	1:55.67	
5	4	Jordan Catchpole	Great Britain	1:56.33	
6	8	Nicholas Bennett	Canada	1:56.52	
7	7	Ricky Betar	Australia	1:56.70	
8	1	Mikhail Kuliabin	RPC	1:56.74	
