= Swimming at the 2020 Summer Paralympics – Men's 50 metre backstroke =

The Men's 50 metre backstroke swimming events for the 2020 Summer Paralympics took place at the Tokyo Aquatics Centre from August 29 to September 3, 2021. A total of five events were contested over this distance.

== Schedule ==
H	Heats	½	Semifinals	F	Final

Date	Sun 29		Mon 30		Tue 31		Wed 1		Thu 2		Fri 3	
Event	M	E	M	E	M	E	M	E	M	E	M	E
S1 50m									H	F		
S2 50m									H	F		
S3 50m	H	F										
S4 50m											H	F
S5 50m			H	F								

== Medal summary ==
The following is a summary of the medals awarded across all 50 metre backstroke events.

Classification	Gold		Silver		Bronze	
S1	Iyad Shalabi; Israel	1:11.79	Anton Kol; Ukraine	1:13.78	Francesco Bettella; Italy	1:14.87
S2	Gabriel Araújo; Brazil	53.96	Alberto Abarza; Chile	57.76	Vladimir Danilenko; RPC	59.47
S3	Zou Liankang; China	45.25	Denys Ostapchenko; Ukraine	45.57	Diego López Díaz; Mexico	45.66
S4	Roman Zhdanov; RPC	40.99 WR	Arnošt Petráček; Czech Republic	41.26	Ángel de Jesús Camacho Ramírez; Mexico	43.25
S5	Zheng Tao; China	31.42	Ruan Jingsong; China	32.97	Wang Lichao; China	33.38

== Results ==
The following were the results of the finals only of each of the Men's 50 metre backstroke events in each of the classifications. Further details of each event, including where appropriate heats and semi finals results, are available on that event's dedicated page.

=== S1 ===
The S1 category is for swimmers who may have tetraplegia, or some form of loss of muscular power in their legs, arms and hands. These swimmers would regularly use a wheelchair.

The final in this classification took place on 2 September 2021:

Rank	Lane	Name	Nationality	Time	Notes
1st place, gold medalist(s)	4	Iyad Shalabi	Israel	1.11.79	
2nd place, silver medalist(s)	5	Anton Kol	Ukraine	1.13.78	
3rd place, bronze medalist(s)	3	Francesco Bettella	Italy	1.14.87	
4	6	Jose Ronaldo Da Silva	Brazil	1.21.57	AM
5	2	Dimitrios Karypidis	Greece	1.25.30	
6	7	Luis Eduardo Rojas Osorno	Colombia	1.37.53	
7	1	Aliaksei Talai	Belarus	1.55.58	

=== S2 ===
The S2 category is for swimmers who may have limited function in their hands, trunk, and legs, and mainly rely on their arms to swim.

The final in this classification took place on 2 September 2021:

Rank	Lane	Name	Nationality	Time	Notes
1st place, gold medalist(s)	4	Gabriel Araújo	Brazil	53.96	AM
2nd place, silver medalist(s)	5	Alberto Abarza	Chile	57.76	
3rd place, bronze medalist(s)	6	Vladimir Danilenko	RPC	59.47	
4	2	Nikita Kazachiner	RPC	1.00.54	
5	3	Roman Bondarenko	Ukraine	1.00.61	
6	1	Ievgen Panibratets	Ukraine	1.03.00	
7	8	Aristeidis Makrodimitris	Greece	1.03.28	
8	7	Jacek Czech	Poland	1.05.13	

=== S3 ===
The S3 category is for swimmers who have leg or arm amputations, have severe coordination problems in their limbs, or have to swim with their arms but don't use their trunk or legs.

The final in this classification took place on 29 August 2021:

Rank	Lane	Name	Nationality	Time	Notes
1st place, gold medalist(s)	3	Zou Liankang	China	45.25	
2nd place, silver medalist(s)	5	Denys Ostapchenko	Ukraine	45.57	
3rd place, bronze medalist(s)	4	Diego López Díaz	Mexico	45.66	
4	2	Jesús Hernández Hernández	Mexico	45.75	
5	6	Vincenzo Boni	Italy	47.88	
6	1	Serhii Palamarchuk	Ukraine	49.65	
7	7	Josia Tim Alexander Topf	Germany	49.99	
8	8	Miguel Ángel Martínez Tajuelo	Spain	54.57	

=== S4 ===
The S4 category is for swimmers who have function in their hands and arms but can't use their trunk or legs to swim, or they have three amputated limbs.

The final in this classification took place on 3 September 2021:

Rank	Lane	Name	Nationality	Time	Notes
1st place, gold medalist(s)	5	Roman Zhdanov	RPC	40.99	WR
2nd place, silver medalist(s)	4	Arnošt Petráček	Czech Republic	41.26	
3rd place, bronze medalist(s)	3	Ángel de Jesús Camacho Ramírez	Mexico	43.25	
4	2	Dmytro Vynohradets	Ukraine	44.91	
5	6	Liu Benying	China	45.21	
6	1	Matz Topkin	Estonia	45.42	
7	8	Xavier Torres	Spain	46.93	
8	7	Ronystony Cordeiro da Silva	Brazil	46.95	

=== S5 ===
The S5 category is for swimmers who have hemiplegia, paraplegia or short stature.

The final in this classification took place on 30 August 2021:

Rank	Lane	Name	Nationality	Time	Notes
1st place, gold medalist(s)	6	Tao Zheng	China	31.42	WR
2nd place, silver medalist(s)	4	Ruan Jingsong	China	32.97	
3rd place, bronze medalist(s)	3	Wang Lichao	China	33.38	
4	5	Yaroslav Semenenko	Ukraine	35.05	
5	2	Daniel de Faria Dias	Brazil	35.99	
6	7	Igor Plotnikov	RPC	37.40	
7	1	Andrew Mullen	Great Britain	37.96	
8	8	Antoni Ponce Bertran	Spain	38.42	
