= Swimming at the 2020 Summer Paralympics – Women's 50 metre breaststroke SB3 =

Women's 50 metre breaststroke SB3 at the XVI Paralympic Games
- Venue: Tokyo Aquatics Centre
- Dates: 31 August 2021
- Competitors: 14 from 11 nations

Medalists
1st place, gold medalist(s)		Marta Fernández Infante	Spain
2nd place, silver medalist(s)		Nataliia Butkova	RPC
3rd place, bronze medalist(s)		Nely Miranda	Mexico

The Women's 50 metre breaststroke swimming events for the 2020 Summer Paralympics took place at the Tokyo Aquatics Centre on 31 August 2021.

== SB3 ==
The SB3 category is for swimmers who have function in their hands and arms but are unable to use their trunk or legs to swim, or they have three amputated limbs.

=== Heats ===
The swimmers with the top eight times, regardless of heat, advanced to the final.

Rank	Heat	Lane	Name	Nationality	Time	Notes
1	1	5	Marta Fernández Infante	Spain	59.46	Q
2	2	7	Nely Miranda	Mexico	1:02.61	Q
3	2	5	Patrícia Pereira	Brazil	1:03.37	Q
4	2	4	Leanne Smith	United States	1:03.49	Q
5	1	1	Nataliia Butkova	RPC	1:03.56	Q
6	2	3	Patricia Valle	Mexico	1:05.03	Q
7	1	4	Maryna Verbova	Ukraine	1:05.10	Q
8	1	3	Olga Sviderska	Ukraine	1:05.84	Q
9	2	2	Zoya Shuchurova	RPC	1:07.57	
10	2	6	Ellie Challis	Great Britain	1:10.37	PR
11	1	6	Dominika Mičková	Czech Republic	1:13.46	
12	1	7	Gina Böttcher	Germany	1:17.41	
13	1	2	Tammy Cunnington	Canada	1:17.94	
14	2	1	Veronika Guirenko	Israel	1:22.17	

=== Final ===
Rank	Lane	Name	Nationality	Time	Notes
1st place, gold medalist(s)	4	Marta Fernández Infante	Spain	58.21	
2nd place, silver medalist(s)	2	Nataliia Butkova	RPC	1:00.54	
3rd place, bronze medalist(s)	5	Nely Miranda	Mexico	1:01.60	
4	3	Patrícia Pereira	Brazil	1:01.82	
5	6	Leanne Smith	United States	1:02.95	
6	1	Maryna Verbova	Ukraine	1:03.09	
7	7	Patricia Valle	Mexico	1:04.34	
8	8	Olga Sviderska	Ukraine	1:04.75	
