= Denys Ostapchenko =

Ukrainian para swimmer (born 2001)

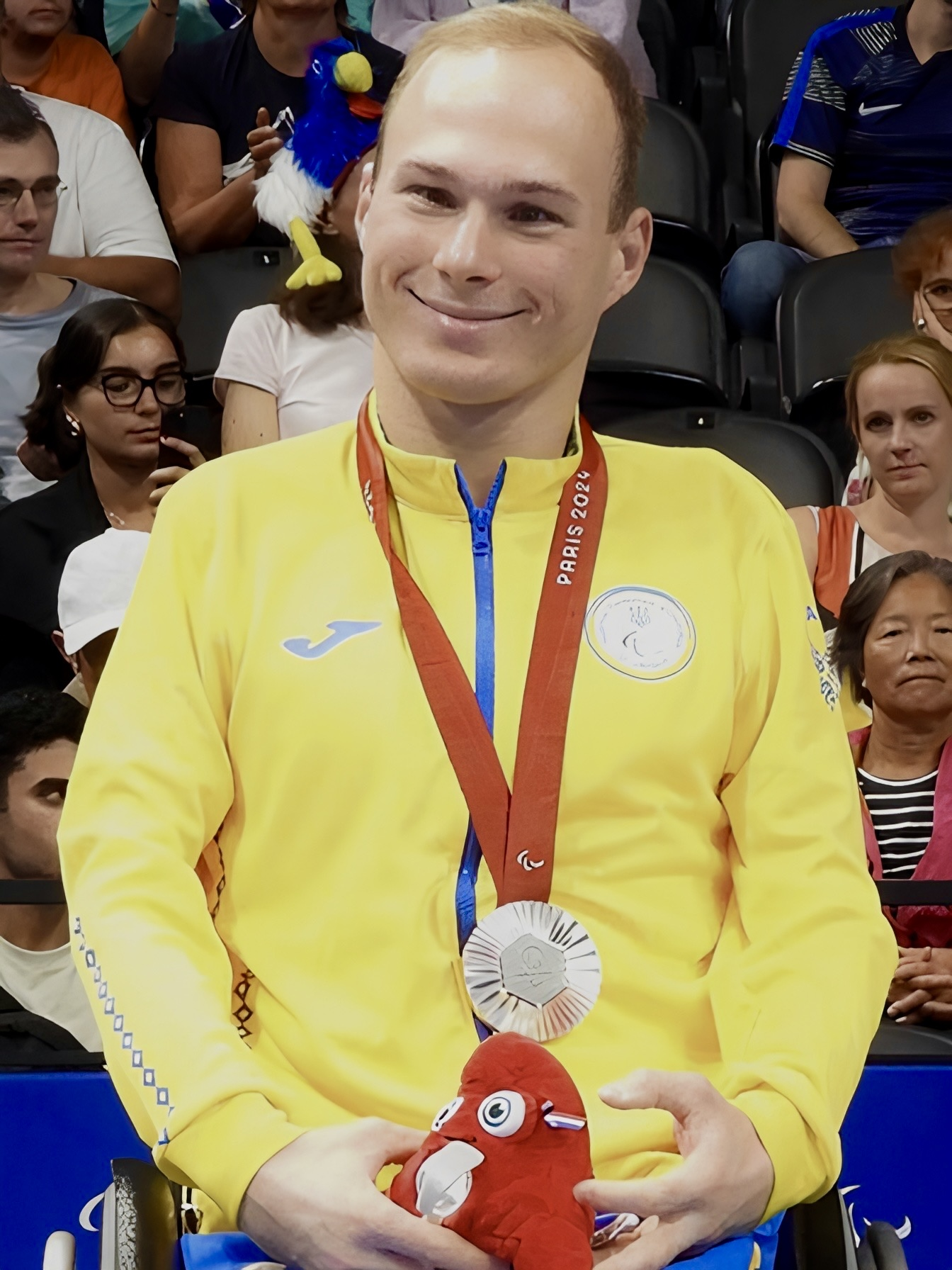
- Ostapchenko at the 2024 Summer Paralympics

Personal information
- Nationality: Ukrainian
- Born: 19 April 2001 (age 25) Myrhorod, Ukraine

Sport
- Sport: Paralympic swimming
- Disability class: S3
- Coached by: Galyna Boyko; Ilia Kalaida
Medal record
Men's para swimming
Representing Ukraine
Event	1st	2nd	3rd
Paralympic Games	2	3	1
World Championships	5	4	5
European Championships	2	7	2
Total	9	14	8
Paralympic Games
Gold medal – first place	2020 Tokyo	200 m freestyle S3
Gold medal – first place	2024 Paris	50 m backstroke S3
Silver medal – second place	2020 Tokyo	50 m backstroke S3
Silver medal – second place	2024 Paris	50 m freestyle S3
Silver medal – second place	2024 Paris	200 m freestyle S3
Bronze medal – third place	2020 Tokyo	50 m freestyle S3
World Championships
Gold medal – first place	2023 Manchester	50 m backstroke S3
Gold medal – first place	2023 Manchester	50 m freestyle S3
Gold medal – first place	2023 Manchester	100 m freestyle S3
Gold medal – first place	2023 Manchester	200 m freestyle S3
Gold medal – first place	2025 Singapore	50 m backstroke S3
Silver medal – second place	2019 London	200 m freestyle S3
Silver medal – second place	2022 Madeira	200 m freestyle S3
Silver medal – second place	2025 Singapore	100 m freestyle S3
Silver medal – second place	2025 Singapore	200 m freestyle S3
Bronze medal – third place	2019 London	50 m freestyle S3
Bronze medal – third place	2019 London	mixed 4x50 m medley relay 20pts
Bronze medal – third place	2022 Madeira	50 m backstroke S3
Bronze medal – third place	2022 Madeira	50 m freestyle S3
Bronze medal – third place	2025 Singapore	50 m freestyle S3
European Championships
Gold medal – first place	2024 Madeira	50 m backstroke S3
Gold medal – first place	2026 Kocaeli	200 m freestyle S3
Silver medal – second place	2018 Dublin	50 m backstroke S3
Silver medal – second place	2018 Dublin	50 m freestyle S3
Silver medal – second place	2018 Dublin	200 m freestyle S3
Silver medal – second place	2020 Funchal	50 m freestyle S3
Silver medal – second place	2024 Madeira	200 m freestyle S3
Silver medal – second place	2024 Madeira	4x50 m medley relay 20pts
Silver medal – second place	2026 Kocaeli	100 m freestyle S3
Bronze medal – third place	2024 Madeira	4x50 m freestyle relay 20pts
Bronze medal – third place	2026 Kocaeli	50 m freestyle S3

Denys Ostapchenko (born 19 April 2001) is a Ukrainian para swimmer. He represented Ukraine at the 2020 and 2024 Summer Paralympics.

== Career ==
Ostapchenko represented Ukraine in 50 metre backstroke S3 event at the 2020 Summer Paralympics and won a silver medal. He also competed in the 50 metre freestyle S3 event and won a bronze medal. He then competed in the 200 metre freestyle S3 event and won a gold medal.

Ostapchenko represented Ukraine in the 50 metre backstroke S3 event at the 2024 Summer Paralympics and won a gold medal. He also competed in the 50 metre freestyle S3 event and won a silver medal. He was part of the Ukraine team that won a bronze medal in the Mixed 4x50 Medley Relay 20 Pts.
