= 2022 World Para Swimming Championships – Men's 50 metre breaststroke =

The men's 50m breaststroke events at the 2022 World Para Swimming Championships were held at the Penteada Olympic Swimming Complex in Madeira between 12 and 18 June.

== Medalists ==
Event	Gold	Silver	Bronze
SB2	José Arnulfo Castorena; Mexico	Grant Patterson; Australia	Jesús Hernández Hernández; Mexico
SB3	Efrem Morelli; Italy	Miguel Luque Ávila; Spain	Takayuki Suzuki; Japan

== Results ==
=== SB2 ===
Heats

13 swimmers from ten nations took part. The swimmers with the top eight times, regardless of heat, advanced to the final.

Rank	Heat	Lane	Name	Nation	Result	Notes
1	2	4	José Arnulfo Castorena	Mexico	1:00.83	Q
2	1	4	Jesús Hernández Hernández	Mexico	1:02.99	Q
3	2	5	Grant Patterson	Australia	1:04.13	Q
4	2	3	Cristopher Tronco Sánchez	Mexico	1:04.36	Q
5	2	6	Ioannis Kostakis	Greece	1:06.86	Q
6	1	3	Emmanuele Marigliano	Italy	1:08.09	Q
7	1	5	Charkorn Kaewsri	Thailand	1:10.18	Q
8	1	6	Daniel Robles Ferrer	Spain	1:18.93	Q
9	2	2	Gabriel Araújo	Brazil	1:20.76	
10	1	2	Patricio Tse Anibal Lopez Fernandez	Dominican Republic	1:44.52	
11	2	7	Bruno Becker da Silva	Brazil	1:47.12	
12	2	1	Jacob Brayshaw	Canada	1:54.67	
13	1	7	Amr Abdalla	Egypt	2:13.65	

Final

The final was held on 12 June 2022.

Rank	Name	Nation	Result	Notes
1st place, gold medalist(s)	José Arnulfo Castorena	Mexico	59.55	
2nd place, silver medalist(s)	Grant Patterson	Australia	1:03.58	
3rd place, bronze medalist(s)	Jesús Hernández Hernández	Mexico	1:04.02	
4	Emmanuele Marigliano	Italy	1:06.59	
5	Ioannis Kostakis	Greece	1:08.20	
6	Charkorn Kaewsri	Thailand	1:14.03	
7	Daniel Robles Ferrer	Spain	1:14.73	
	Cristopher Tronco Sánchez	Mexico	DSQ	
