= 2022 World Para Swimming Championships – Men's 50 metre backstroke =

The men's 50m backstroke events at the 2022 World Para Swimming Championships were held at the Penteada Olympic Swimming Complex in Madeira between 12 and 18 June.

== Medalists ==
Event	Gold	Silver	Bronze
S1	Anton Kol; Ukraine	Jose Ronaldo da Silva; Brazil	Dimitrios Karypidis; Greece
S2	Gabriel Araújo; Brazil	Jacek Czech; Poland	Alberto Abarza; Chile
S3	Diego López Díaz; Mexico	Jesús Hernández Hernández; Mexico	Denys Ostapchenko; Ukraine
S4	Arnošt Petráček; Czech Republic	Cameron Leslie; New Zealand	Ángel de Jesús Camacho Ramírez; Mexico
S5	Samuel da Silva de Oliveira; Brazil	Antoni Ponce Bertran; Spain	Kaede Hinata; Japan

== Results ==
=== S5 ===
Final

Eight swimmers from seven nations took part.

Rank	Name	Nation	Result	Notes
1st place, gold medalist(s)	Samuel da Silva de Oliveira	Brazil	36.58	
2nd place, silver medalist(s)	Antoni Ponce Bertran	Spain	37.82	
3rd place, bronze medalist(s)	Kaede Hinata	Japan	37.98	
4	Abbas Karimi	United States	40.68	
5	Siyazbek Daliyev	Kazakhstan	41.81	
6	Tiago de Oliveira Ferreira	Brazil	41.96	
7	Kevin Alfonso Moreno Gualaco	Colombia	42.93	
8	Jeremy Jossan Jurado Barrera	Panama	57.14	
