= Mexico at the 2020 Summer Paralympics =

- Flag of Mexico
- IPC code: MEX
- NPC: Federacion Mexicana de Deporte

in Tokyo, Japan 24 August 2021 – 5 September 2021
- Competitors: 60 (31 men and 29 women) in 11 sports
- Flag bearer (opening): Amalia Pérez / Diego López Díaz
- Flag bearer (closing): Juan Diego García López
- Medals Ranked 20th: Gold 7 Silver 2 Bronze 13 Total 22

Summer Paralympics appearances (overview)
- 1972; 1976; 1980; 1984; 1988; 1992; 1996; 2000; 2004; 2008; 2012; 2016; 2020; 2024

Mexico participated at the 2020 Summer Paralympics in Tokyo, Japan, from 24 August to 5 September 2021. Originally scheduled to take place from 25 August to 6 September 2020, the Paralympics were postponed by a year in March 2020 due to the COVID-19 pandemic, with the rescheduled Games still referred to as Tokyo 2020 for marketing and branding purposes. It was the nation's thirteenth appearance at the Summer Paralympics.

== Medalists ==
Medal	Name	Sport	Event	Date
Gold	Jesús Hernández Hernández	Swimming	Men's 150 metre individual medley SM3	28 August
Gold	Amalia Pérez	Powerlifting	Women's 61 kg	28 August
Gold	Mónica Olivia Rodríguez Saavedra; Guide: Kevin Aguilar	Athletics	Women's 1500 metres T11	30 August
Gold	Arnulfo Castorena	Swimming	Men's 50 metre breaststroke SB2	31 August
Gold	José Rodolfo Chessani García	Athletics	Men's 400 metres T38	31 August
Gold	Diego López Díaz	Swimming	Men's 50 metre freestyle S3	2 September
Gold	Juan Diego García López	Taekwondo	Men's 75 kg	3 September
Silver	Gloria Zarza Guadarrama	Athletics	Women's shot put F54	30 August
Silver	Diego López Díaz	Swimming	Men's 200 metre freestyle S3	3 September
Bronze	Fabiola Ramírez	Swimming	Women's 100 metre backstroke S2	25 August
Bronze	Rosa María Guerrero	Athletics	Women's discus throw F55	27 August
Bronze	Eduardo Ávila	Judo	Men's 81 kg	28 August
Bronze	Lenia Ruvalcaba	Judo	Women's −70 kg	29 August
Bronze	Diego López Díaz	Swimming	Men's 50m freestyle S3	29 August
Bronze	Jesús Hernández Hernández	Swimming	Men's 50 metre breaststroke SB2	31 August
Bronze	Nely Miranda	Swimming	Women's 50 metre breaststroke SB3	31 August
Bronze	Juan Pablo Cervantes García	Athletics	Men's 100 metres T54	1 September
Bronze	Rebeca Valenzuela	Athletics	Women's shot put F12	3 September
Bronze	Leonardo de Jesús Pérez Juárez	Athletics	Men's 100 metres T52	3 September
Bronze	Ángel de Jesús Camacho Ramírez	Swimming	Men's 50 metre backstroke S4	3 September
Bronze	Jesús Hernández Hernández	Swimming	Men's 200 metre freestyle S3	3 September
Bronze	Rosa Carolina Castro Castro	Athletics	Women's discus throw F38	4 September

=== Medals by date ===
Medals by date
Day	Date	Gold medal	Silver medal	Bronze medal	Total
1	25 Aug	0	0	1	1
2	26 Aug	0	0	0	0
3	27 Aug	0	0	1	1
4	28 Aug	2	0	1	3
5	29 Aug	0	0	2	2
6	30 Aug	1	1	0	2
7	31 Aug	2	0	2	4
8	1 Sept	0	0	1	1
9	2 Sept	1	0	0	1
10	3 Sept	1	1	4	6
11	4 Sept	0	0	1	1
12	5 Sept	0	0	0	0
Total		7	2	13	22

=== Medals by sport ===
Medals by sport
	Sport	Gold medal	Silver medal	Bronze medal	Total
1	Swimming	3	1	6	10
2	Athletics	2	1	5	8
3	Powerlifting	1	0	0	1
4	Taekwondo	1	0	0	1
5	Judo	0	0	2	2
Total		7	2	13	22

== Competitors ==
The following is the list of number of competitors participating in the Games:

Sport	Men	Women	Total
Archery	2	0	2
Athletics	12	12	24
Boccia	1	0	1
Equestrian	1	0	1
Judo	1	1	2
Powerlifting	1	3	4
Rowing	1	0	1
Swimming	9	9	18
Table tennis	1	2	3
Taekwondo	2	1	3
Triathlon	0	1	1
Total	31	29	60

== Archery ==
Two athletes represented Mexico at the 2020 Summer Paralympics.

Athlete	Event	Ranking round		Round of 32	Round of 16	Quarterfinals	Semifinals	Final / BM	
Athlete	Event	Score	Seed	Opposition Score	Opposition Score	Opposition Score	Opposition Score	Opposition Score	Rank
Omar Echeverría	Men's individual compound open	659	33	Quesada (CRC) L 131–139	Did Not Advance				=33
Samuel Molina	Men's individual recurve open	609	13	Fabcic (SLO) L 0-6	Did Not Advance				=13

== Athletics ==
24 athletes represented Mexico at the 2020 Summer Paralympics.

DQ: Disqualified | SB: Season Best | Q: Qualified by place or standard based on overall position after heats | DNM: Did not mark | DNA: Did not advance | N/A: Not available, stage was not contested | PB: Personal Best | WR: World Record | PR: Paralympic Record | AR: Area Record

Men's track

Athlete	Event	Heats		Final	
Athlete	Event	Result	Rank	Result	Rank
Juan Pablo Cervantes	Men's 100m T54	13.85 AR, PB	2 Q	13.87	Bronze medal
Juan Pablo Cervantes	Men's 400m T54	48.31	13	DNA	13
Rodolfo Chessani	Men's 100m T38	11.62 PB	7 Q	11.77	8
Rodolfo Chessani	Men's 400m T38	50.84	1 Q	49.99 AR, PB	Gold medal
Jorge González	Men's 400m T13	50.53 SB	10	DNA	10
Edgar Navarro	Men's 100m T51	N/A		22.92	5
Edgar Navarro	Men's 200m T51	N/A		41.04 SB	5
Edgar Navarro	Men's 400m T52	DQ	11	DNA	11
Leonardo Pérez	Men's 100m T52	N/A		17.44 PB	Bronze medal
Leonardo Pérez	Men's 400m T52	1:02.92	6 Q	1:01.66	5
Leonardo Pérez	Men's 1500m T52	N/A		3:54.82	5

Men's field

Athlete	Event	Final	
Athlete	Event	Result	Rank
Edgar Barajas	Men's javelin throw F57	40.25	8
Edgar Barajas	Men's shot put F57	11.33	11
Bryan Enríquez	Men's shot put F37	13.94 PB	5
Edgar Ulises Fuentes	Men's javelin throw F54	28.87 SB	6
Eliezer Gabriel	Men's javelin throw F46	60.28 SB	5
Jorge González	Men's long jump T13	6.48 SB	5
Mario Ramos	Men's club throw F51	30.25 SB	4
José Román Ruiz	Men's shot put F36	14.42	4
Erick Ortiz Monroy	Men's shot put F53	DNM	9

Women's track

Athlete	Event	Heats		Semi-Final		Final	
Athlete	Event	Result	Rank	Result	Rank	Result	Rank
Diana Laura Coraza Guide: Jorge Gaspar	Women's 400m T11	1:01.01 SB	6 Q	1:01.34	7	DNA	7
Diana Laura Coraza Guide: Jorge Gaspar	Women's 1500m T11	5:38.83	8	N/A		DNA	8
Mónica Rodríguez Guide: Kevin Aguilar	Women's 1500m T11	4:47.27	1 Q	N/A		4:37.40 WR	Gold medal
Daniela Velasco Guide: César Belman	Women's 400m T12	1:00.39 SB	5	N/A		DNA	5
Daniela Velasco Guide: César Belman	Women's 1500m T13	4:47.16	4 Q	N/A		4:40.25 SB	7

Women's field

Athlete	Event	Final	
Athlete	Event	Result	Rank
Rosa Carolina Castro	Women's discus throw F38	33.73 PR	Bronze medal
Floralia Estrada Bernal	Women's shot put F57	8.60 PB	8
Floralia Estrada Bernal	Women's discus throw F57	30.34 SB	4
Leticia Ochoa Delgado	Women's discus throw F53	11.58	7
María Estela Salas	Women's discus throw F53	11.00 SB	8
Rosa María Guerrero	Women's discus throw F55	24.11	Bronze medal
Belén Sánchez	Women's discus throw F55	21.32 SB	7
María de los Ángeles Ortiz	Women's shot put F57	10.40 SB	4
Rebeca Valenzuela	Women's shot put F12	13.72 AR, PB	Bronze medal
Rebeca Valenzuela	Women's javelin throw F13	30.02	7
Gloria Zarza	Women's shot put F54	8.06 PB	Silver medal

== Boccia ==
Mexico competed in Individual BC1 events.

Athlete	Event	Pool matches					Quarterfinals	Semifinals	Final / BM	
Athlete	Event	Opposition Score	Opposition Score	Opposition Score	Opposition Score	Rank	Opposition Score	Opposition Score	Opposition Score	Rank
Eduardo Sánchez Rueda	Mixed individual BC1	Zhang (CHN) L 5-3	Smith (GBR) W 7-5	Nakamura (JPN) W 9-1	Ibarbure (ARG) L 5-4	3	Did Not Advance			9

== Equestrian ==
Mexico sent one athlete after qualification.

DNA: Did not advance

Athlete	Horse	Event	Total	
Athlete	Horse	Event	Score	Rank
Ignacio Treviño Fuerte	Solemne Mor	Individual championship test grade III	62.824	17
Ignacio Treviño Fuerte	Solemne Mor	Individual freestyle test grade III	DNA	

== Judo ==
Mexico sent two athletes in Judo. They were Paralympic champions at the time of the event.

Athlete	Event	Preliminaries	Quarterfinals	Semifinals	Repechage First round	Repechage Final	Final / BM	
Athlete	Event	Opposition Result	Opposition Result	Opposition Result	Opposition Result	Opposition Result	Opposition Result	Rank
Lenia Ruvalcaba	Women's −70 kg	BYE	Kaldani (GEO) L 10IPP-0	N/A	BYE	Paschalidou (GRE) W 10IPP-0	Ulucam (TUR) W 10IPP-0	Bronze medal
Eduardo Ávila Sánchez	Men's −81 kg	BYE	Solovey (UKR) W 10s1–0	Karomatov (UZB) L 0s2–1s1	BYE		Petit (FRA) W 10s1–1s1	Bronze medal

== Powerlifting ==
Mexico sent four athletes in Powerlifting.

DNM: Did not mark

Athlete	Event	Total lifted	Rank
Perla Bárcenas	Women's + 86 kg	135	4
José de Jesús Castillo	Men's −107 kg	220	5
Mayra Hernández	Women's – 50 kg	DNM	9
Amalia Pérez	Women's – 61 kg	131	Gold medal

== Rowing ==
Mexico qualified one boat in the men's single sculls events for the games by winning the silver medal at the 2021 FISA Americas Qualification Regatta in Rio de Janeiro, Brazil.

Athlete	Event	Heats		Repechage		Final	
Athlete	Event	Time	Rank	Time	Rank	Time	Rank
Michel Muñoz Malagón	Men's single sculls	11:39.88	6 R	10:16.31	4 FB	11:25.84	9

Qualification Legend: FA=Final A (medal); FB=Final B (non-medal); R=Repechage

== Swimming ==
Three Mexican swimmers qualified to compete in swimming via the 2019 World Para Swimming Championships slot allocation method & 15 Mexican swimmers qualified by MQS.

DQ: Disqualified | Q: Qualified by time based on overall position after heats | DNS: Did not start | DNA: Did not advance | N/A: Not available, event went straight to final

Men

Athlete	Event	Heats		Final	
Athlete	Event	Time	Rank	Time	Rank
Luis Armando Andrade	Men's 100m freestyle S8	1:01.21	8 Q	1:01.23	8
Luis Armando Andrade	Men's 100m butterfly S8	1:04.94	6 Q	1:04.55	7
Luis Armando Andrade	Men's 200m individual medley SM8	2:31.60	10	DNA	10
Ángel de Jesús Camacho	Men's 50m freestyle S4	39.74	4 Q	39.37	4
Ángel de Jesús Camacho	Men's 100m freestyle S4	1:28.02	3 Q	1:27.71	4
Ángel de Jesús Camacho	Men's 200m freestyle S4	3:05.26	3 Q	3:01.50	5
Ángel de Jesús Camacho	Men's 50m backstroke S4	43.99	3 Q	43.25	Bronze medal
Ángel de Jesús Camacho	Men's 150m individual medley SM4	2:51.49	9	DNA	9
Arnulfo Castorena	Men's 50m breaststroke SB2	59.04	1 Q	59.25	Gold medal
Arnulfo Castorena	Men's 150m individual medley SM3	3:22.05	6 Q	3:17.44	5
Juan José Gutierrez	Men's 100m freestyle S6	1:10.99	12	DNA	12
Juan José Gutierrez	Men's 400m freestyle S6	5:14.10	4 Q	5:15.23	5
Juan José Gutierrez	Men's 100m breaststroke SB6	1:28.00	12	DNA	12
Juan José Gutierrez	Men's 200m individual medley SM6	2:48.70	4 Q	2:48.79	7
Raúl Gutiérrez	Men's 100m freestyle S6	1:13.41	15	DNA	15
Raúl Gutiérrez	Men's 400m freestyle S6	5:26.10	6 Q	5:28.62	7
Raúl Gutiérrez	Men's 200m individual medley SM6	2:56.50	11	DNA	11
Jesús Hernández	Men's 50m freestyle S3	47.43	4 Q	46.19	4
Jesús Hernández	Men's 200m freestyle S3	3:31.06	3 Q	3:23.93	Bronze medal
Jesús Hernández	Men's 50m backstroke S3	49.19	5 Q	45.75	4
Jesús Hernández	Men's 50m breaststroke SB2	1:02.04	3 Q	1:02.27	Bronze medal
Jesús Hernández	Men's 150m individual medley SM3	3:13.08	3 Q	2:56.99	Gold medal
Diego López Díaz	Men's 50m freestyle S3	47.34	3 Q	44.66	Gold medal
Diego López Díaz	Men's 200m freestyle S3	3:32.97	4 Q	3:23.57	Silver medal
Diego López Díaz	Men's 50m backstroke S3	45.67	1 Q	45.66	Bronze medal
Diego López Díaz	Men's 150m individual medley SM3	3:18.54	5 Q	3:15.84	4
Gustavo Sánchez	Men's 50m freestyle S4	42.89	13	DNA	13
Gustavo Sánchez	Men's 100m freestyle S4	1:30.80	6 Q	1:35.55	8
Gustavo Sánchez	Men's 200m freestyle S4	3:07.79	6 Q	3:09.78	6
Gustavo Sánchez	Men's 50m backstroke S4	50.69	13	DNA	13
Gustavo Sánchez	Men's 50m breaststroke SB3	56.05	9	DNA	9
Gustavo Sánchez	Men's 150m individual medley SM4	2:52.35	11	DNA	11
Cristopher Tronco	Men's 200m freestyle S2	5:01.68	8 Q	5:08.34	8
Cristopher Tronco	Men's 50m backstroke S2	1:05.57	9	DNA	9
Cristopher Tronco	Men's 100m backstroke S2	2:26.15	9	DNA	9
Cristopher Tronco	Men's 50m breaststroke SB2	1:05.18	4 Q	1:04.46	4

Women

Athlete	Event	Heats		Final	
Athlete	Event	Time	Rank	Time	Rank
Haidee Aceves	Women's 50m backstroke S3	1:08.48	8 Q	1:07.66	7
Haidee Aceves	Women's 100m freestyle S3	2:23.34	8 Q	2:22.60	8
Matilde Alcazar	Women's 100m backstroke S11	1:25.03	10	DNA	10
Matilde Alcazar	Women's 400m freestyle S11	5:26.58	4 Q	5:24.63	5
Matilde Alcazar	Women's 200m individual medley SM11	3:03.28	9	DNA	9
Stefanny Cristino	Women's 50m freestyle S10	30.08	14	DNA	14
Stefanny Cristino	Women's 100m freestyle S10	1:04.51	12	DNA	12
Stefanny Cristino	Women's 400m freestyle S10	N/A		4:49.79	6
Amayrani Hernández	Women's 50m backstroke S5	50.30	10	DNA	10
Luz Kerena López	Women's 100m butterfly S8	N/A		1:24.05	5
Nely Miranda	Women's 50m freestyle S4	43.02	4 Q	42.31	5
Nely Miranda	Women's 50m backstroke S4	58.56	9	DNA	9
Nely Miranda	Women's 50m breaststroke SB3	1:02.61	2 Q	1:01.60	Bronze medal
Nely Miranda	Women's 150m individual medley SM4	3:11.92	9 Q	3:08.71	6
Fabiola Ramírez	Women's 100m freestyle S3	2:32.47	10	DNA	10
Fabiola Ramírez	Women's 50m backstroke S2	1:12.59	3 Q	1:12.66	4
Fabiola Ramírez	Women's 100m backstroke S2	2:52.80	6 Q	2:36.54	Bronze medal
Naomi Somellera	Women's 50m butterfly S7	DNS		DNA	11
Naomi Somellera	Women's 100m breaststroke SB7	1:41.77	5 Q	1:39.41	5
Naomi Somellera	Women's 400m freestyle S7	N/A		5:54.31	8
Naomi Somellera	Women's 200m individual medley SM7	3:23.80	7 Q	DQ	8
Patricia Valle	Women's 50m backstroke S3	1:13.89	11	DNA	11
Patricia Valle	Women's 100m freestyle S3	2:11.21	6 Q	2:08.10	6
Patricia Valle	Women's 50m breaststroke SB3	1:05.03	6 Q	1:04.34	7

== Table tennis ==
Mexico entered three athletes into the table tennis competition at the games. All of the qualified from the 2019 Parapan American Games which was held in Lima, Peru.

Men

Athlete	Event	Group Stage			Round of 16	Quarterfinals	Semifinals	Final	
Athlete	Event	Opposition Result	Opposition Result	Rank	Opposition Result	Opposition Result	Opposition Result	Opposition Result	Rank
Victor Reyes	Singles class 2	Park (KOR) L 0–3	Perlic (SRB) L 2–3	3	Did Not Advance				

Women

Athlete	Event	Group Stage				Round of 16	Quarterfinals	Semifinals	Final	
Athlete	Event	Opposition Result	Opposition Result	Opposition Result	Rank	Opposition Result	Opposition Result	Opposition Result	Opposition Result	Rank
Claudia Pérez	Singles class 4	van Zon (NED) L 0–3	Barneoud (FRA) L 0–3	N/A	3	Did Not Advance				
Edith Sigala	Singles class 3	Muzinic (CRO) L 0–3	Blanco (ARG) W 3–1	Bruneli (ITA) L 0–3	3	Did Not Advance				

== Taekwondo ==
Mexico qualified three athletes to compete at the Paralympics competition. Francisco Pedroza and Daniela Andrea Martínez Mariscal qualified by winning the gold medal at the 2020 Americas Qualification Tournament in San Jose, Costa Rica. Meanwhile, the other athlete, Juan Diego García López qualified by finishing second in world ranking men's –75 kg category K44.

DNA: Did not advance | PTF: Win by final score | RSC: Referee stops combat

Athlete	Event	Round of 16	Quarterfinals	Semifinals	Repechage Quarterfinal	Repechage Semifinal	Final / BM	
Athlete	Event	Opposition Result	Opposition Result	Opposition Result	Opposition Result	Opposition Result	Opposition Result	Rank
Diego García	Men's –75 kg	BYE	Abuzarli (AZE) W 38-5, PTF	Isaldibirov (RPC) W 14-12, PTF	N/A		Pourrahnamaahmadgourabi (IRI) W 26-20, PTF	Gold medal
Francisco Pedroza	Men's +75 kg	Abidar (LBA) L 25-28, PTF	N/A		Yakut (TUR) W 23-2, PTF	Omirali (KAZ) W 18-15, PTF	Ataev (RPC) L 4–18, PTF	5
Daniela Martínez	Women's +58 kg	Schiel (FRA) W 36-2, RSC	Bezerra de Menezes (BRA) L 12-24, PTF	N/A	Shahab (IRI) L 10-17, PTF	DNA		9

== Triathlon ==
Mexico qualified a female athlete to compete at the Paralympics competition.

Athlete	Event	Swim	Trans 1	Bike	Trans 2	Run	Total Time	Rank
Brenda Osnaya	Women's PTWC	14:34	1:46	42:45	1:15	16:12	1:16:32	5

== See also ==
- Mexico at the Paralympics
- Mexico at the 2020 Summer Olympics
