= Diego López Díaz =

Mexican Paralympic swimmer

Diego López
Personal information
- Full name: Diego López Díaz
- Nationality: Mexican
- Born: 13 November 1994 (age 31) Xalapa, Veracruz

Sport
- Country: Mexico
- Sport: Paralympic swimming
- Disability class: S3
Medal record
Men's swimming
Representing Mexico
Summer Paralympics
Gold medal – first place	2020 Tokyo	50m freestyle S3
Silver medal – second place	2020 Tokyo	200 m freestyle S3
Bronze medal – third place	2020 Tokyo	50m backstroke S3
World Championships
Gold medal – first place	2019 London	50m freestyle S3
Gold medal – first place	2019 London	200m freestyle S3
Gold medal – first place	2019 London	50m backstroke S3
Gold medal – first place	2019 London	150m medley S3
Gold medal – first place	2022 Madeira	50m backstroke S3
Gold medal – first place	2022 Madeira	50m freestyle S3
Silver medal – second place	2023 Manchester	100m freestyle S3
Bronze medal – third place	2023 Manchester	200m freestyle S3
Parapan American Games
Gold medal – first place	2019 Lima	50m freestyle S3
Gold medal – first place	2019 Lima	100m freestyle S3
Gold medal – first place	2019 Lima	200m freestyle S3
Gold medal – first place	2019 Lima	50m backstroke S3
Gold medal – first place	2019 Lima	150m medley S3
Gold medal – first place	2023 Santiago	50m freestyle S3
Gold medal – first place	2023 Santiago	200m freestyle S3
Gold medal – first place	2023 Santiago	50m backstroke S3

Diego López Díaz (born 13 November 1994) is a Mexican Paralympic swimmer.

== Career ==
He represented Mexico at the 2016 Summer Paralympics and at the 2020 Summer Paralympics, where he won a gold medal in the 50 meters freestyle S3 event and a bronze medal in the 50 meters backstroke S3 event. He also participated in the 2019 Parapan American Games, where he won five gold medals.

Paralympics
Preceded by Arly Velásquez	Flagbearer for Mexico (with Amalia Pérez); Tokyo 2020	Succeeded by Arly Velásquez
