= Grant Patterson =

Australian Paralympic swimmer

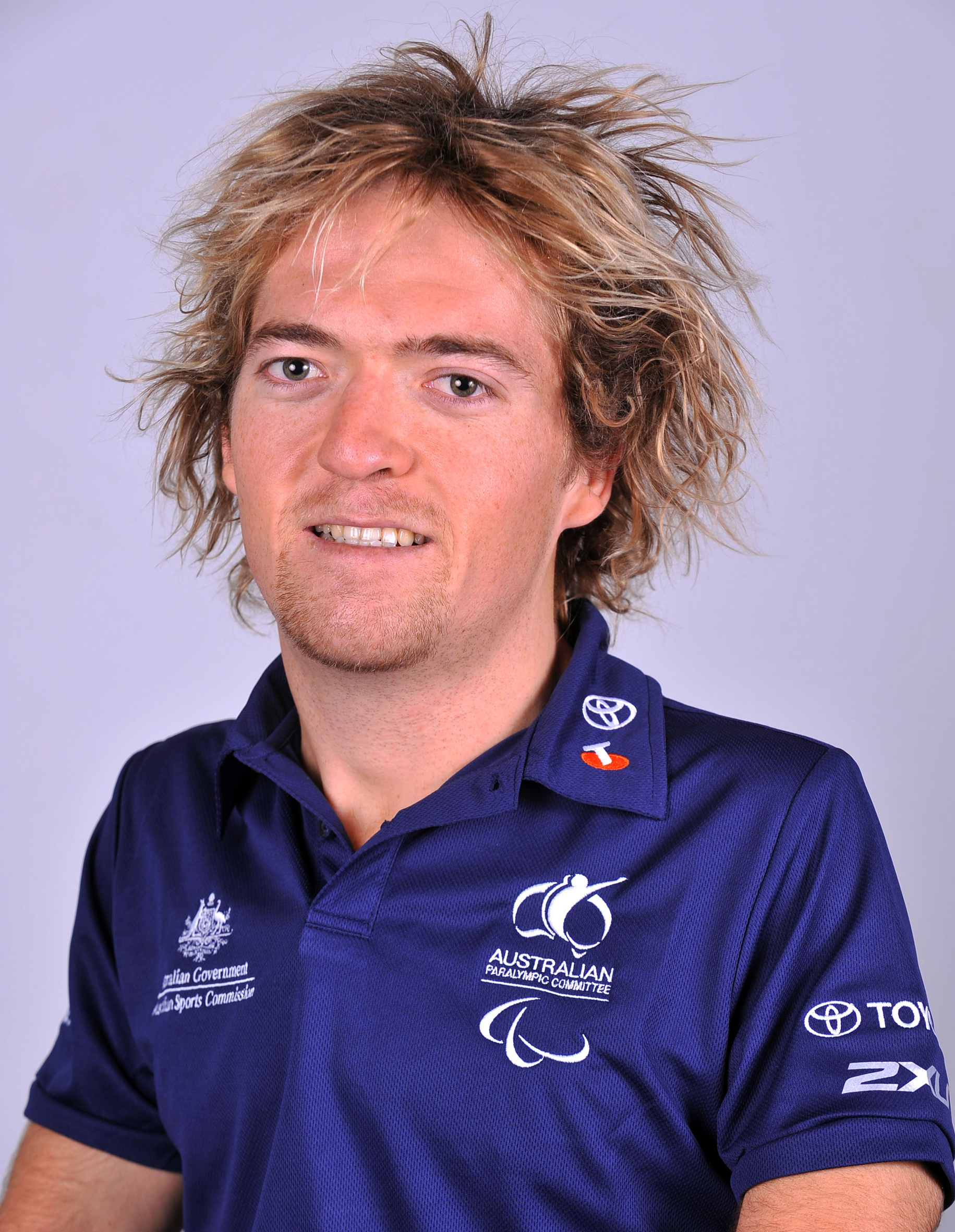
- 2012 Australian Paralympic team portrait of Patterson

Personal information
- Full name: Grant Patterson
- Nickname: Scooter
- Nationality: Australian
- Born: 19 May 1989 (age 37) Cairns, Queensland, Australia

Sport
- Sport: Swimming
- Strokes: Freestyle, medley
- Classifications: S3, SB2, SM3
- Club: Central Cairns
- Coach: Herbie Howard
Medal record
Men's paralympic swimming
Representing Australia
Paralympic Games
Silver medal – second place	2020 Tokyo	50 m breaststroke SB2
Bronze medal – third place	2020 Tokyo	150 m medley SM3
Bronze medal – third place	2024 Paris	50 m breaststroke SB2
Bronze medal – third place	2024 Paris	150 m medley SM3
World Championships
Silver medal – second place	2013 Montreal	150 m medley S3
Silver medal – second place	2015 Glasgow	150 m medley SM3
Silver medal – second place	2019 London	50 m breaststroke SB2
Silver medal – second place	2022 Madeira	50 m breaststroke SB2
Bronze medal – third place	2013 Montreal	50 m freestyle S3
Bronze medal – third place	2013 Montreal	100 m freestyle S3
Bronze medal – third place	2019 London	150 m medley SM3
Bronze medal – third place	2022 Madeira	150 m medley SM3

Grant Patterson (born 19 May 1989) is an Australian Paralympic swimmer. At the 2020 Tokyo Paralympics, his second games, he won a silver and bronze medal. At the 2024 Paris Paralympics, he won two bronze medals.

== Personal ==
Patterson was born on 19 May 1989 and is from Cairns, Queensland. He attended Redlynch State College, a state school in Redlynch. Patterson has Diastrophic dysplasia, a joint fusion disability connected to dwarfism. Other sports he competes in include Australian rules football, cricket and ice hockey.

Patterson owes his nickname, "Scooter", to the non-motorised scooter which he uses to move around, including up to the edge of the pool during competitions.

== Swimming ==
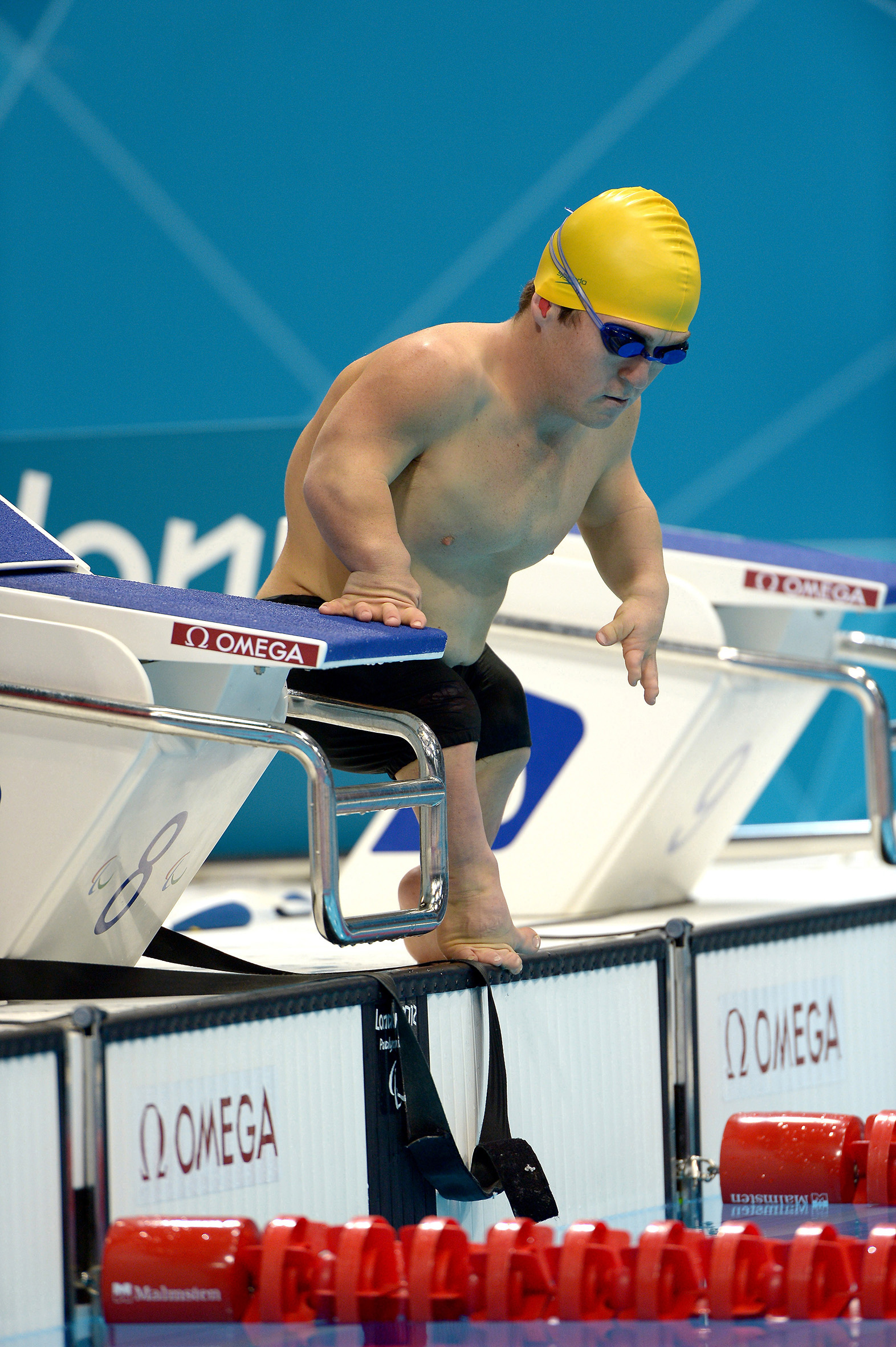
Patterson at the 2012 London Paralympics

Patterson is an S3 classified swimmer. He is coached by Herbie Howard.

Patterson started competitive swimming in 2007. At the 2009 Australian Open, he came in first in the 100m backstroke event. He first represented Australia in 2009 at the Arafura Games where he won two gold medals and one bronze medal. At 2010 Berlin International Championships, he earned two gold medals and one silver medal. Competing at the 2011 Australian National Championships, he set a world record in the 100m backstroke event. He was a member of the Australian team competing at the 2010 IPC Swimming World Championships in Eindhoven, Netherlands. At the 2011 Para Pan Pacific Championships, he earned seven medals. He was selected to represent Australia at the 2012 Summer Paralympics in swimming. He did not medal at the 2012 Games.

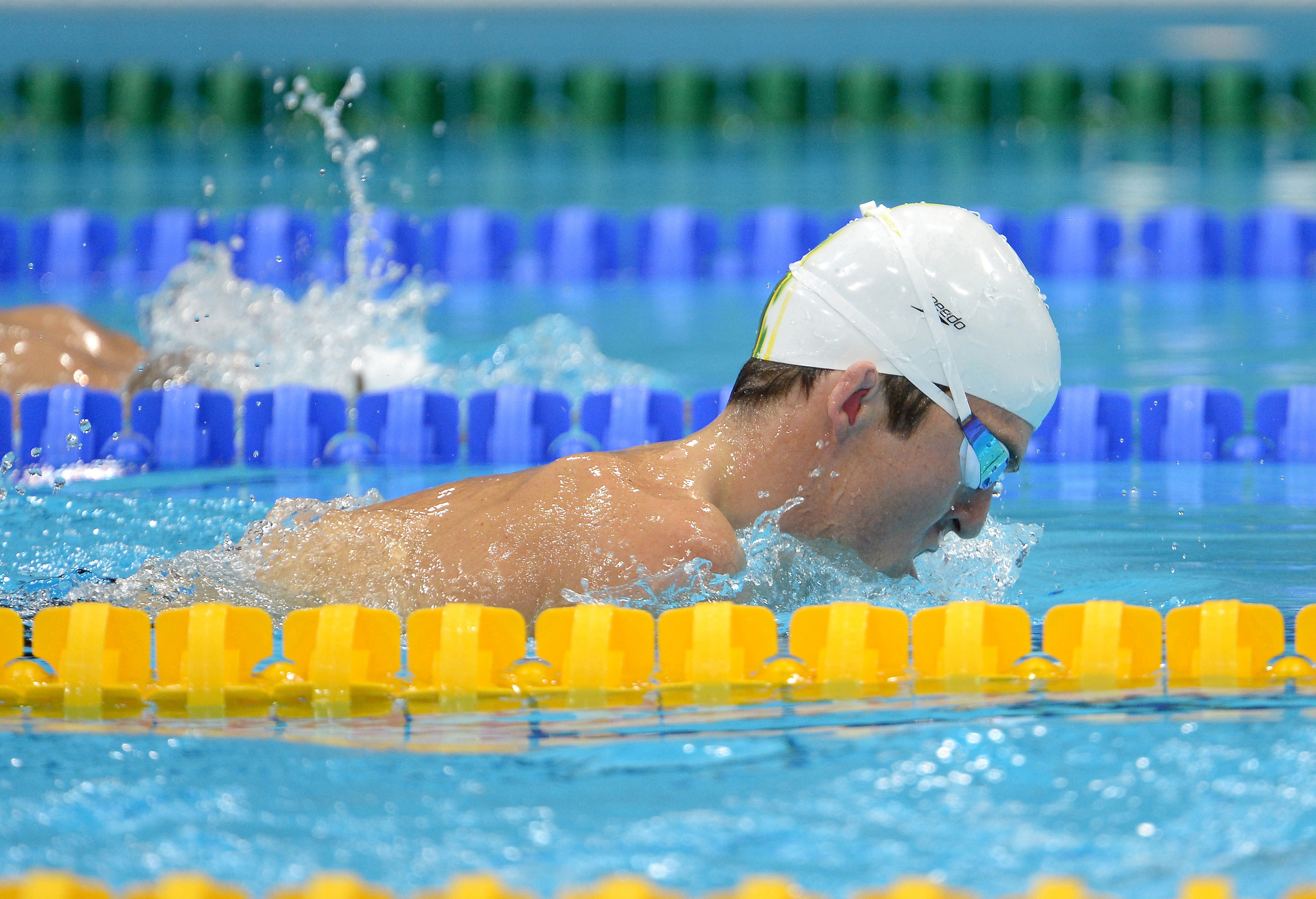
Patterson at the 2012 London Paralympics

At the 2013 IPC Swimming World Championships in Montreal, Canada, Patterson won a silver medal in the Men's 150 m Individual Medley S3 and two bronze medals in the Men's 50 m Freestyle S3 and Men's 100 m Freestyle S3.

Competing at the 2015 IPC Swimming World Championships in Glasgow, Scotland, Patterson won a silver medal in the Men's 150m Individual Medley S3. He finished fifth in the Men's 200m Freestyle S3 and Men's 50m Breaststroke SB2, sixth in the Men's 50m Freestyle S3 and Men's 50m Backstroke S3 and seventh in the Mixed 4x50m Freestyle Relay 20pts.

At the 2019 World Para Swimming Championships, London, Patterson won the silver medal in the Men's 50 m Breaststroke SB2 and bronze medal in the Men's 150 m Individual Medley SM3.

At the 2020 Tokyo Paralympics, he won the silver medal in the Men's 50 m breaststroke SB2 with a time of 1:01.79, two-and-a-half seconds behind the gold medal winner, José Arnulfo Castorena of Mexico. Patterson also a bronze medal in the Men's 150 m individual medley SM3 with a time of 3:05.57. He competed in three other events but did not qualify for their finals.

At the 2022 World Para Swimming Championships, Madeira. Patterson won two medals - silver in the Men's 50 m Breaststroke SB2 and bronze in the Men's 150 m Individual Medley SM3. Patterson did not medal in four other events.

At the 2024 Paris Paralympics, Patterson won bronze in the 150 m medley SM3, and Men's 50 m breaststroke SB2. He finished 8th in the Men's 200 m freestyle S3.

== Recognition ==
- 2014 – Swimming Australia Paralympic Program Swimmer of the Year
- 2021 - Keys to the City of Cairns in recognition to performances at the 2020 Tokyo Paralympics.
- 2021 - Swimming Australia Awards Swimmers' Swimmer with Ben Popham
- 2024 - Paralympics Australia Uncle Kevin Coombs Spirit of the Games Award
