= José Arnulfo Castorena =

Mexican Paralympic swimmer

Personal information
- Full name: José Arnulfo Castorena Vélez
- Born: 27 May 1978 (age 48) Guadalajara, Mexico
- Height: 1.28 m (4 ft 2 in)

Sport
- Country: Mexico
- Sport: Paralympic swimming
- Disability: Phocomelia
- Disability class: S4, SB2, SM3
Medal record
Paralympic swimming
Representing Mexico
Paralympic Games
Gold medal – first place	2000 Sydney	50m breaststroke SB2
Gold medal – first place	2004 Athens	50m breaststroke SB2
Gold medal – first place	2020 Tokyo	50m breaststroke SB2
Gold medal – first place	2024 Paris	50 m breaststroke SB2
Silver medal – second place	2004 Athens	150m individual medley SM3
Silver medal – second place	2012 London	50m breaststroke SB2
Bronze medal – third place	2004 Athens	50m butterfly S4
World Championships
Gold medal – first place	2002 Mar del Plata	50m breaststroke SB2
Gold medal – first place	2006 Durban	50m breaststroke SB2
Gold medal – first place	2006 Durban	150m individual medley SM3
Gold medal – first place	2010 Eindhoven	50m breaststroke SB2
Gold medal – first place	2019 London	50m breaststroke SB2
Gold medal – first place	2022 Madeira	50m breaststroke SB2
Gold medal – first place	2023 Manchester	50m breaststroke SB2
Gold medal – first place	2025 Singapore	50m breaststroke SB2
Silver medal – second place	1998 Christchurch	150m individual medley SM3
Silver medal – second place	2002 Mar del Plata	50m butterfly S4
Silver medal – second place	2002 Mar del Plata	150m individual medley SM3
Silver medal – second place	2006 Durban	4x50m freestyle relay
Silver medal – second place	2013 Montreal	50m breaststroke SB2
Silver medal – second place	2015 Glasgow	50m breaststroke SB2
Silver medal – second place	2017 Mexico City	50m breaststroke SB2
Silver medal – second place	2017 Mexico City	150m individual medley SM3
Bronze medal – third place	2006 Durban	50m butterfly S4
Bronze medal – third place	2010 Eindhoven	150m individual medley SM3
Bronze medal – third place	2013 Montreal	150m individual medley SM3
Bronze medal – third place	2015 Glasgow	150m individual medley SM3
Parapan American Games
Gold medal – first place	2003 Mar del Plata	50m breaststroke SB2
Gold medal – first place	2003 Mar del Plata	150m individual medley SM3
Gold medal – first place	2011 Guadalajara	50m breaststroke SB2
Gold medal – first place	2011 Guadalajara	150m individual medley SM3
Gold medal – first place	2019 Lima	50m breaststroke SB3
Silver medal – second place	2003 Mar del Plata	50m butterfly S4
Silver medal – second place	2011 Guadalajara	4x50m freestyle relay
Silver medal – second place	2019 Lima	150m individual medley SM3
Bronze medal – third place	2003 Mar del Plata	50m freestyle S4
Bronze medal – third place	2003 Mar del Plata	100m freestyle S4
Bronze medal – third place	2003 Mar del Plata	200m freestyle S4
Bronze medal – third place	2019 Lima	100m freestyle S4

José Arnulfo Castorena Vélez (born 27 May 1978) is a Mexican Paralympic swimmer who competes in international elite events. He is a four-time Paralympic champion, five-time Parapan American Games champion and an eight-time World champion.

== Personal life ==
Castorena was born with underdeveloped legs and a missing left arm. He had a difficult upbringing when his mother died after giving birth to him, his father abandoned him and his grandmother looked after him until she died when Castorena was of a young age.
