= Josia Topf =

German Paralympic swimmer

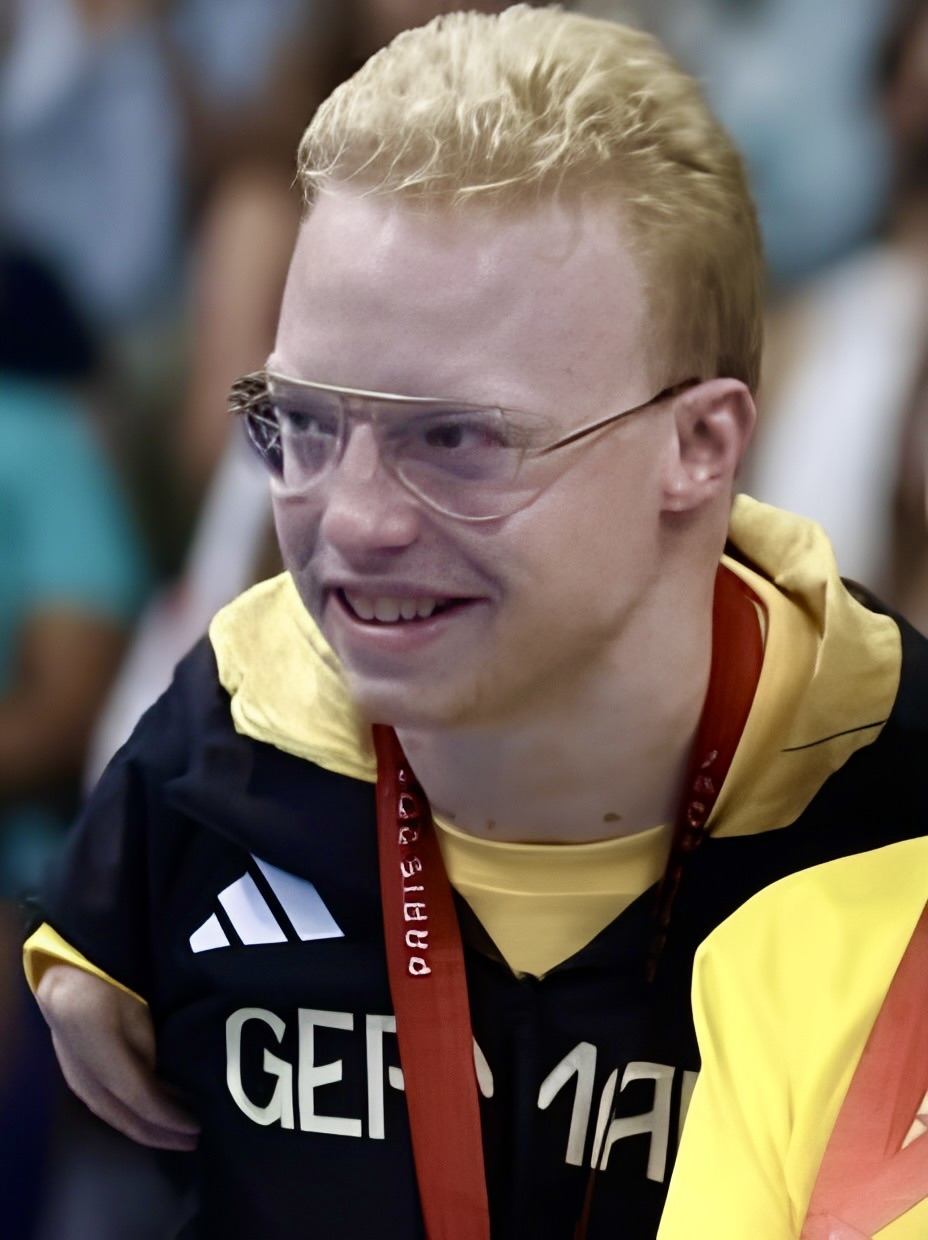
- Topf at the 2024 Summer Paralympics

Personal information
- Full name: Josia Tim Alexander Topf
- Born: 25 April 2003 (age 23) Erlangen, Germany

Sport
- Country: Germany
- Sport: Paralympic swimming
- Disability: Dysmelia
- Disability class: S3
Medal record
Paralympic swimming
Representing Germany
Paralympic Games
Gold medal – first place	2024 Paris	150 m ind. medley SM3
Silver medal – second place	2024 Paris	50 m backstroke S3
Bronze medal – third place	2024 Paris	50 m freestyle S3
World Championships
Gold medal – first place	2025 Singapore	150 m ind. medley SM3
Gold medal – first place	2025 Singapore	50 m freestyle S3
Silver medal – second place	2025 Singapore	50 m backstroke S3
Bronze medal – third place	2022 Madeira	100m freestyle S3
Bronze medal – third place	2025 Singapore	100 m freestyle S3
European Championships
Gold medal – first place	2026 Kocaeli	50 m freestyle S3
Silver medal – second place	2026 Kocaeli	150 m ind. medley SM3
Bronze medal – third place	2018 Dublin	4x50m freestyle relay 20pts
Bronze medal – third place	2026 Kocaeli	100 m freestyle S3
Bronze medal – third place	2026 Kocaeli	200 m freestyle S3
Bronze medal – third place	2026 Kocaeli	50 m backstroke S3

Josia Tim Alexander Topf (born 25 April 2003) is a German Paralympic swimmer who competes in international elite competitions. He is a European bronze medalist and has competed at the 2020 Summer Paralympics but did not medal.
