= Jesús Hernández Hernández =

Mexican Paralympic swimmer

Jesús Hernández
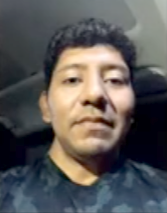
- Hernández on a 2021 livestream

Personal information
- Full name: Jesús Hernández Hernández
- Nationality: Mexican
- Born: 27 October 1991 (age 34) Juan Rodríguez Clara, Veracruz
- Occupations: Para swimmer; politician
- Years active: 2015–present

Congress of Guanajuato Proportional representation
- Incumbent
- Assumed office 25 September 2024

Personal details
- Party: National Action Party

Sport
- Country: Mexico
- Sport: Swimming
- Disability: Spastic cerebral palsy
- Disability class: S4
- Event: Paralympic swimming
Medal record
Men's swimming
Representing Mexico
Summer Paralympics
Gold medal – first place	2020 Tokyo	150m ind. medley SM3
Bronze medal – third place	2016 Rio	50m backstroke S4
Bronze medal – third place	2020 Tokyo	50 m breaststroke SB2
Bronze medal – third place	2020 Tokyo	200 m freestyle S3
World Championships
Gold medal – first place	2022 Madeira	200m freestyle S3
Gold medal – first place	2022 Madeira	100m freestyle S3
Silver medal – second place	2017 Mexico City	50m backstroke S4
Silver medal – second place	2022 Madeira	50m backstroke S3
Silver medal – second place	2022 Madeira	50m freestyle S3
Bronze medal – third place	2017 Mexico City	200m freestyle S4
Bronze medal – third place	2017 Mexico City	50m freestyle S4
Bronze medal – third place	2022 Madeira	50m breaststroke SB2
Parapan American Games
Gold medal – first place	2019 Lima	50m backstroke S4
Gold medal – first place	2019 Lima	50m breaststroke SB3
Silver medal – second place	2019 Lima	50m freestyle S4
Silver medal – second place	2019 Lima	100m freestyle S4
Silver medal – second place	2023 Santiago	50m backstroke S4
Bronze medal – third place	2023 Santiago	150m ind. medley SM4

Jesús Hernández Hernández (born 27 October 1991) is a Mexican Paralympic swimmer and politician.

He represented Mexico at the 2016 Summer Paralympics, where he won a bronze medal in the 50 meters backstroke S4 event, and at the 2020 Summer Paralympics, where he won a gold medal in the 150 meters individual medley SM3 event. He also participated at the 2019 Parapan American Games, where he won two gold medals and two silver medals.

== Early life ==
Jesús Hernández Hernández was born on 27 October 1991, in Juan Rodríguez Clara, Veracruz, and was raised in Sinaloa, the State of Mexico, and Irapuato, Guanajuato. He has spastic cerebral palsy, a congenital shoulder malformation, and a defect in the fourth lumbar vertebra, which affects his limbs, leaving him tetraplegic in the superior part of the body, preventing him to raise his shoulders. Also, he has myelomeningocele.

Inspired by Paralympic swimmer Juan Ignacio Reyes, his experiences in the hydrotherapy pool at a Children's Rehabilitation Center (CRIT), and Michael Phelps's success at the 2008 Summer Olympics, Hernández began swimming at age 13.

== Sports career ==
=== 2015–2016: Rio Summer Paralympics ===
He competed at the 2015 Parapan American Games in Toronto, Canada, in the 50-meter freestyle S4 event, where he finished fourth.

He was a member of the Mexican Paralympic team at the 2016 Summer Paralympics in Rio de Janeiro, Brazil. He won the bronze medal in the men's 50-meter backstroke S4, earning his first Paralympic medal. He also competed in the men's 200 m freestyle S4 event, finishing ninth,

=== 2017–2021: Tokyo Summer Paralympics ===
Hernández competed at the 2017 World Para Swimming Championships in Mexico City, Mexico. He won three medals, one silver at the 50 m backstroke S4 event, and two bronze medals at the 50 m freestyle S4 and 200 m freestyle S4. At the 2019 World Para Swimming Championships in London, England, he did not advance for the medals in the 50 m freestyle event.

At the 2019 Parapan American Games in Lima, Peru, Hernández earned to gold medals in the 50 m backstroke S4 and 50 m breaststroke SB3 categories, and two silver medals in the 50 m freestyle S4 and 100 m freestyle S4 categories.

At the 2020 Summer Paralympics, held in Tokyo, Japan, in 2021 due to the COVID-19 pandemic, Hernández won a gold medal in the 150 m individual medley SM3 event, as well as two bronze mesals in the 50 breaststroke SB2 and 200 m freestyle S3 categories.

=== 2022–2024: Paris Summer Paralympics ===
At the 2022 World Para Swimming Championships, in Madeira, Portugal, Hernández won two gold medals in the 100 m freestyle S3 and 200 m freestyle S3 events, earned silver in the 50 m backstroke S3 and 50 m freestyle S3 events, and bronze in the 50 m breaststroke SB2 category. He received the National Sports Award, in the Paralympic Sports category that year.

At the 2023 World Para Swimming Championships in Manchester, England, he finished eighth in the 100 m freestyle S4 event. At the 2023 Parapan American Games, in Santiago, Chile, he won a silver medal in the 50 m backstroke S4 event, and a bronze medal in the 150 m individual medley SM4 category.

At the 2024 Summer Paralympics, he competed in the 50 backstroke S4 event, ending eighth.

== Political career ==
In 2024, he was elected to the Congress of Guanajuato as a Proportional representation representative of the National Action Party (PAN), becoming the first state legislator with a disability to assume office.
