= Tokyo Aquatics Centre =

Indoor aquatics centre in Tokyo

Coordinates: 35°39′04″N 139°48′54″E

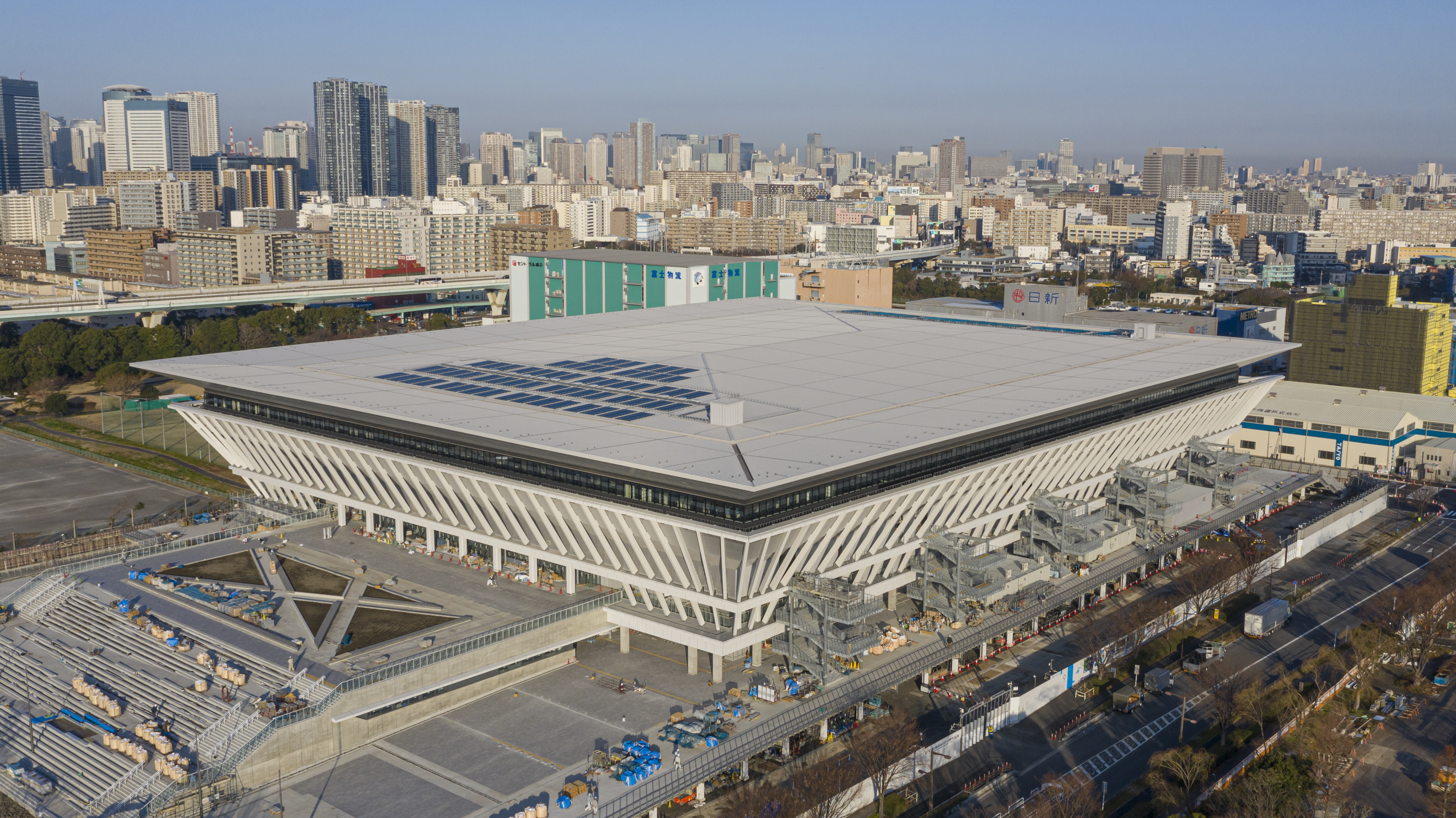
- The Tokyo Aquatics Centre in January 2020
- Interactive map of Tokyo Aquatics Centre
- Address: Tokyo, Japan
- Capacity: 15,000 (10,000 post-Olympics)

Construction
- Built: 2017
- Opened: 24 October 2020
- Architect: Paul Noritaka Tange

Tenants
- 2020 Summer Olympics; 2020 Summer Paralympics; 2026 Asian Games

The Tokyo Aquatics Centre (東京アクアティクスセンター, Tōkyō akuatikusu sentā) is an indoor swimming pool in the Mori- Beach Park (辰巳の森海浜公園) in Tatsumi in the Kōtō ward in eastern Tokyo.

Construction began in April 2017 and was completed in 2020. The total construction cost was 56.7 billion ¥ (471 million €). The opening, scheduled for 22 March 2020, was postponed due to the COVID-19 pandemic and took place on 23 July 2020 without an audience.

The swimming hall was built for the 2020 Summer Olympics and can accommodate up to 12,000 spectators. The arena was also used for swimming competitions at the 2020 Summer Paralympics.

The swimming arena has two swimming pools and a pool for water diving. The roof was built on the ground and raised step by step to a height of 37 metres. It is 160 metres long, 130 metres wide and 10 metres thick. The roof weighs 7,000 tonnes. In the future, the Aquatics Centre will host hundreds of national, international and junior competitions every year. Furthermore, the citizens of Tokyo will also be able to use the pool after the Games.

== History ==
Construction of the centre began in April 2017 and was completed in 2019 by the Tokyo Metropolitan Government. In 2018, during construction, the scandal of KYB's manipulation of seismic isolation damper data was discovered, and since such devices were also used in this building, the building's hydraulic oil dampers needed to be replaced. The building was scheduled to open in 22 March 2020 for the Youth Olympic Cup, but was cancelled due to the effects of the COVID-19 pandemic in Japan. It was inaugurated on 24 October 2020 with a sports exhibition.

== Gallery ==
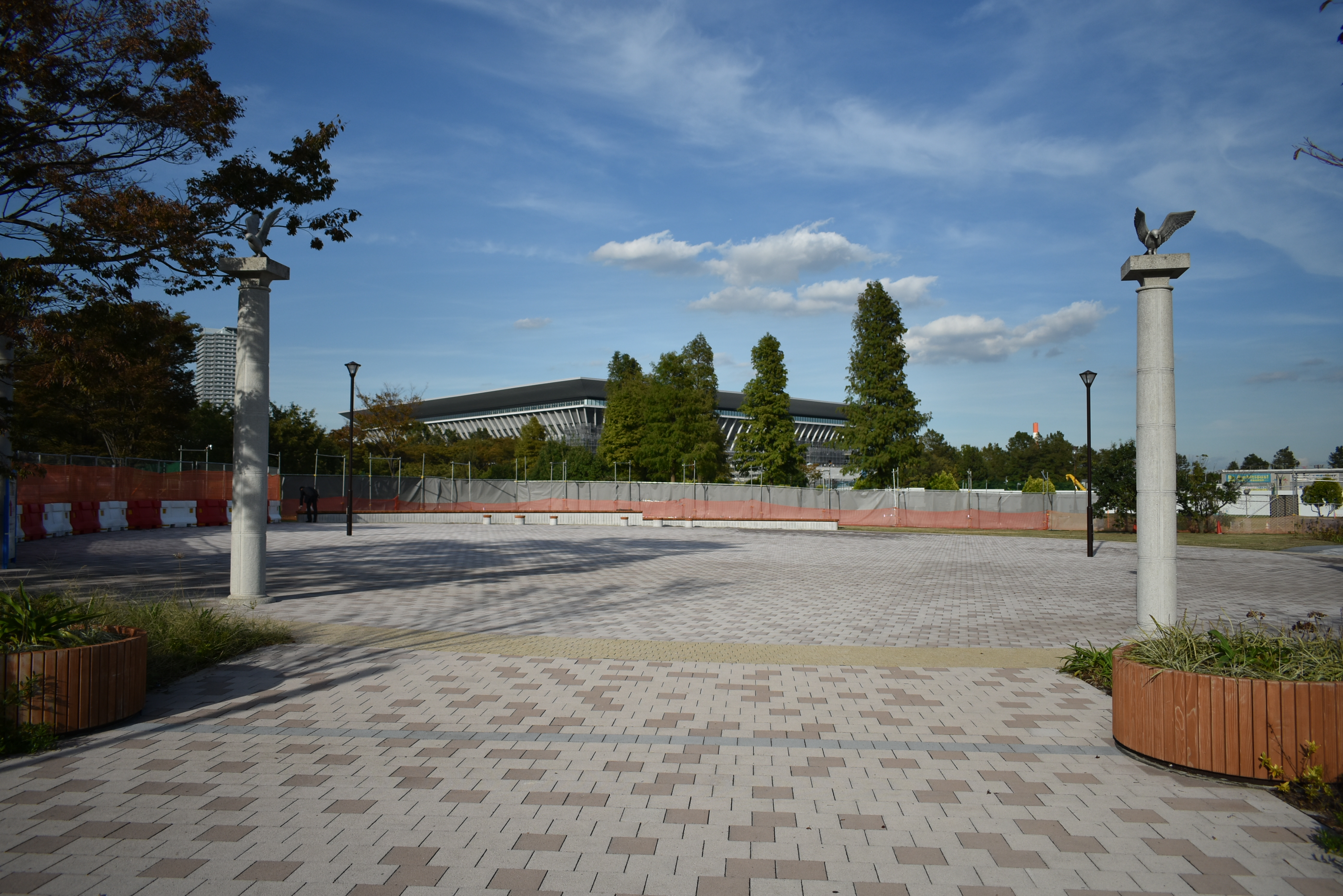
Entrance from Mori Beach Park

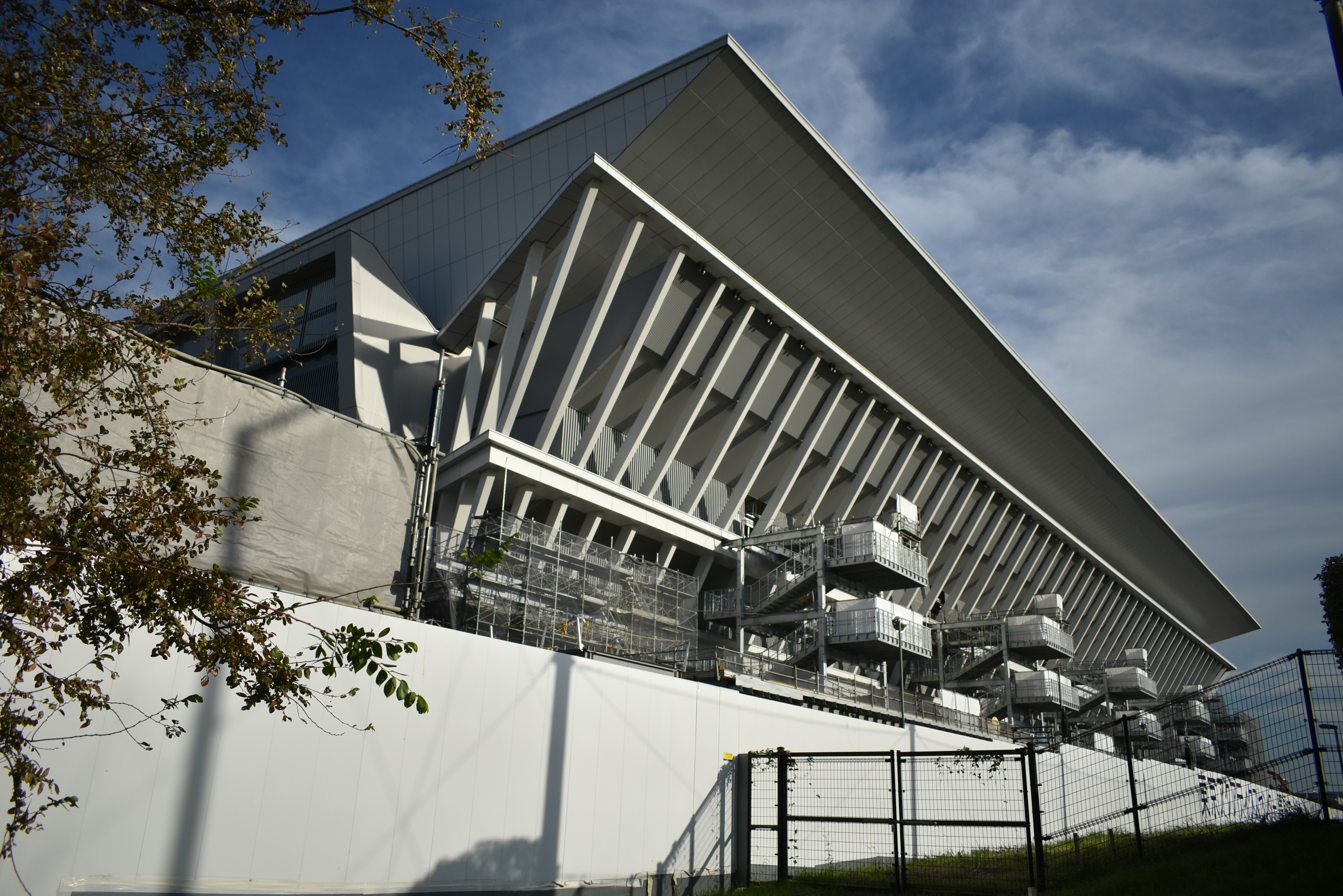
Aquatics Center (Southwestside, 2019)

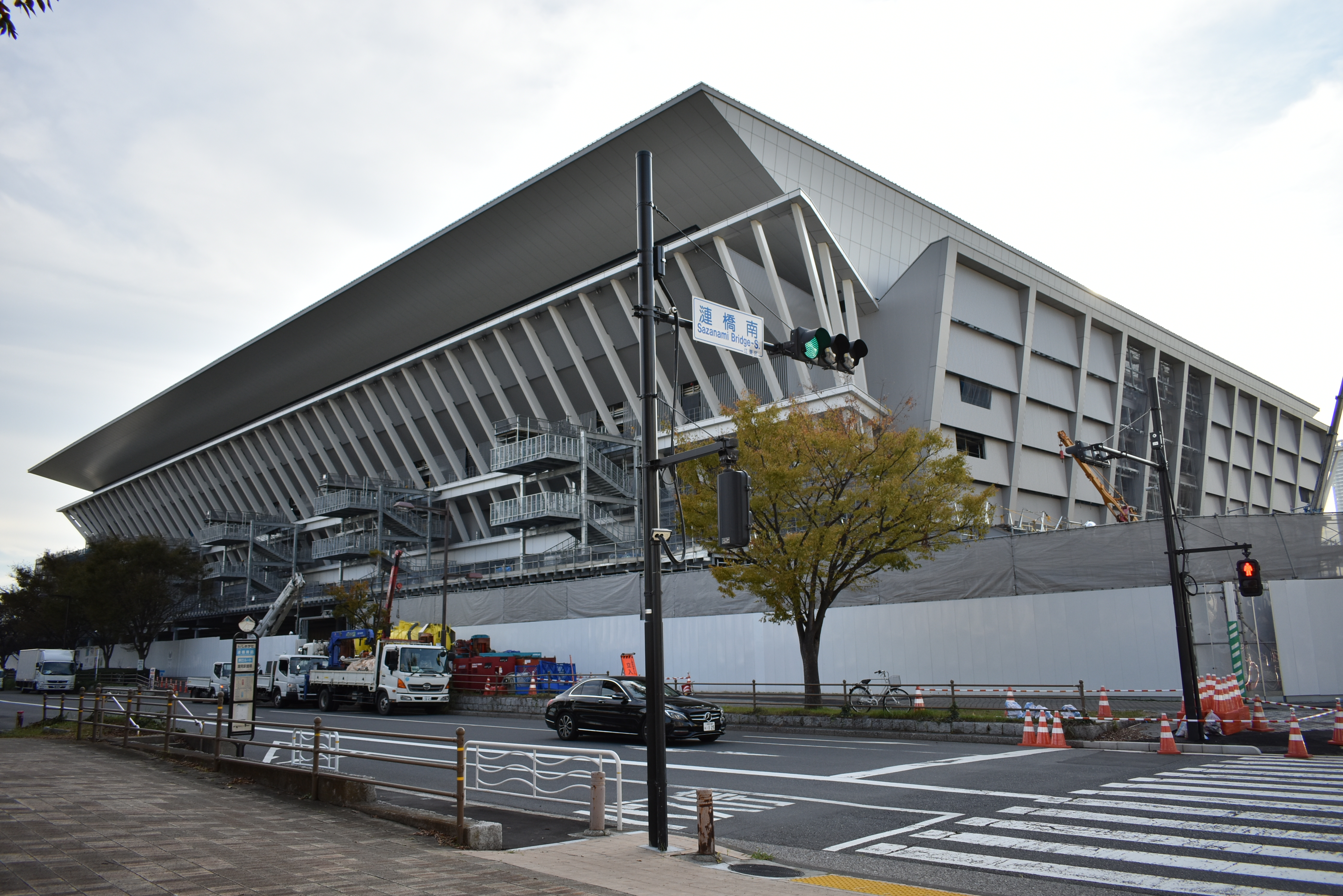
Aquatics Center (Northeastside, 2019)

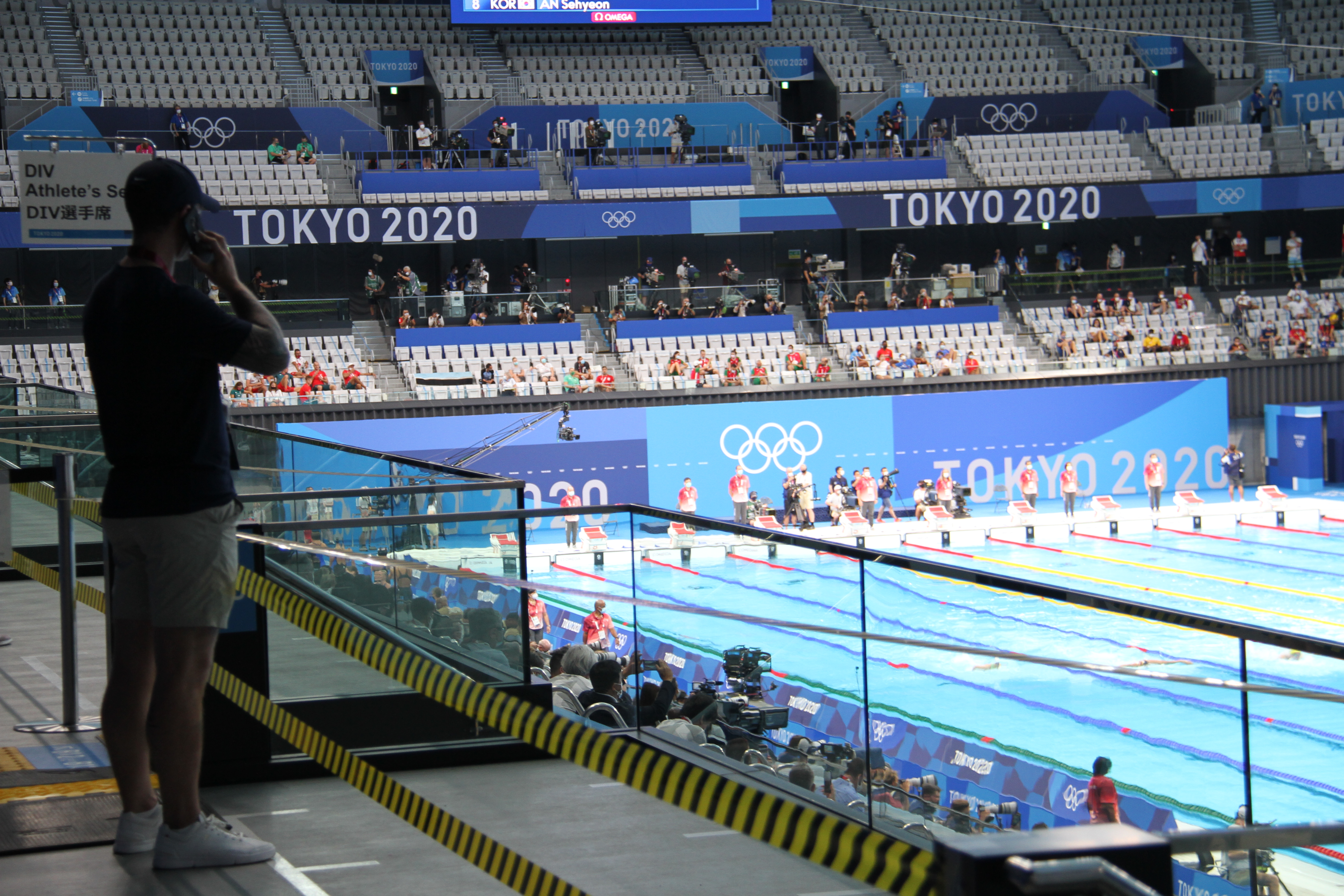
Inside the aquatics centre

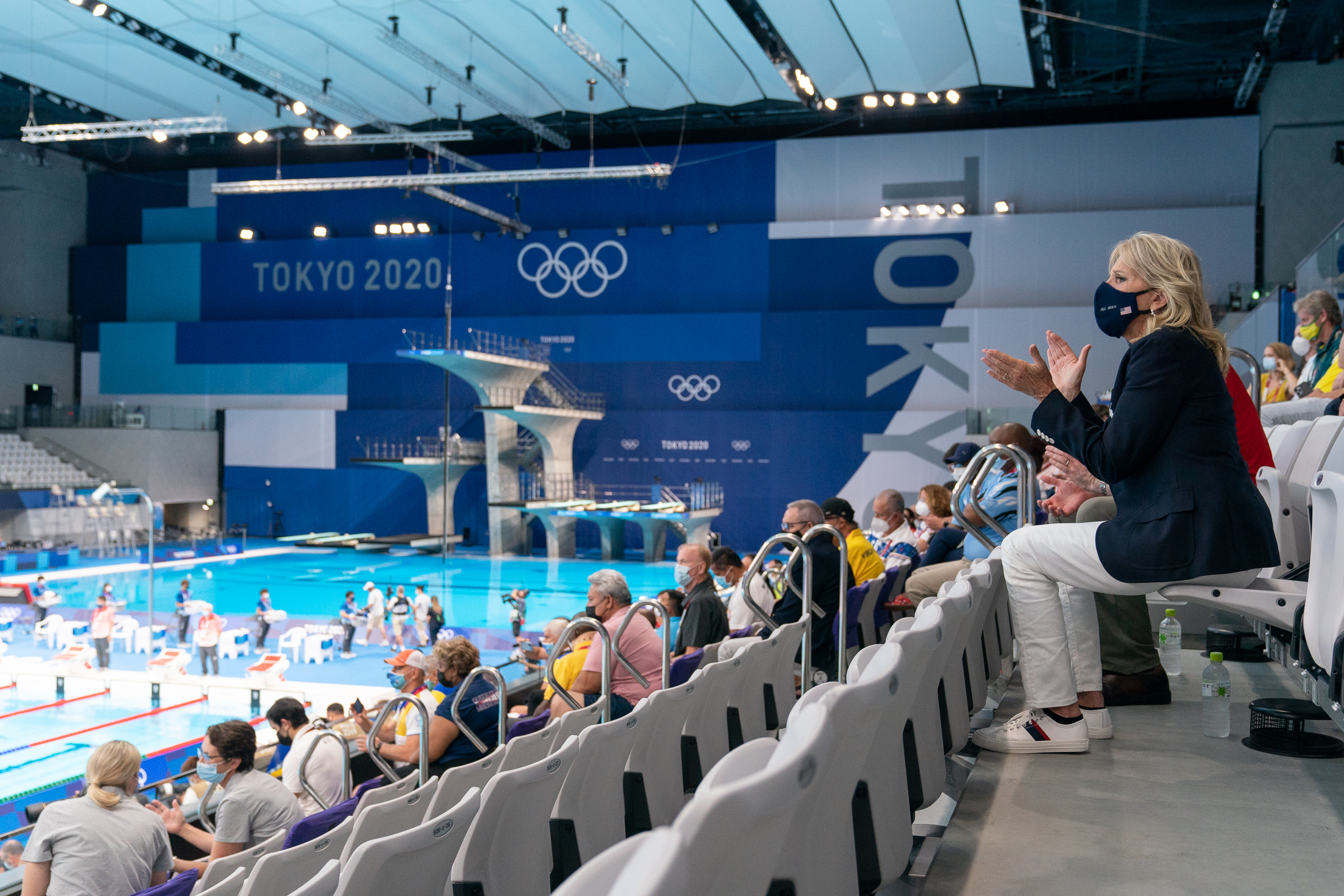
Former US First Lady Dr. Jill Biden watches the Olympic swimming competition.
