= S3 (classification) =

Para-swimming classification

S3, SB2, SM3 are Para swimming classifications used for categorising swimmers based on their level of disability. People in this class have some arm and hand function, but no use of their trunk and legs. They have severe disabilities in all their limbs. Swimmers in this class have a variety of different disabilities including quadriplegia from spinal cord injury, cerebral palsy and multiple amputations.

Events this class can participate in include 50m and 100m Freestyle, 200m Freestyle, 50m Backstroke, 50m Butterfly, 50m Breaststroke and 150m Individual Medley events. The class competes at the Paralympic Games.

== Definition ==
This classification is for swimming. In the classification title, S represents Freestyle, Backstroke and Butterfly strokes. SB means breaststroke. SM means individual medley. Swimming classifications are on a gradient, with one being the most severely physically impaired to ten having the least amount of physical disability. Jane Buckley, writing for the Sporting Wheelies, describes the swimmers in this classification as having: "reasonable arm strokes but no use of their legs or trunk; Swimmers with severe coordination problems in all limbs and Swimmers with severe limb loss in four limbs. Swimmers in this class again have increased ability when compared to those in Class S2."

== Disability groups ==
This class includes people with several disability types include cerebral palsy and amputations.

=== Amputee ===
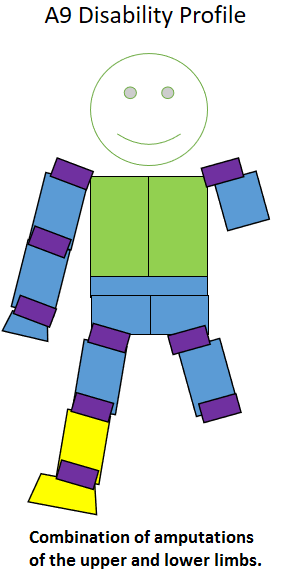
Type of amputation for an A9 classified sportsperson.

ISOD amputee A9 swimmers may be found in several classes. These include S2, S3, S4, S5 and S8. Prior to the 1990s, the A9 class was often grouped with other amputee classes in swimming competitions, including the Paralympic Games. Swimmers in this class have a similar stroke length and stroke rate to able bodied swimmers.

The nature of a person's amputations in this class can effect their physiology and sports performance. Because of the potential for balance issues related to having an amputation, during weight training, amputees are encouraged to use a spotter when lifting more than 15 pounds (6.8 kg). Lower limb amputations effect a person's energy cost for being mobile. To keep their oxygen consumption rate similar to people without lower limb amputations, they need to walk slower. Because they are missing a limb, amputees are more prone to overuse injuries in their remaining limbs. Common problems with intact upper limbs for people in this class include rotator cuffs tearing, shoulder impingement, epicondylitis and peripheral nerve entrapment.

=== Cerebral palsy ===
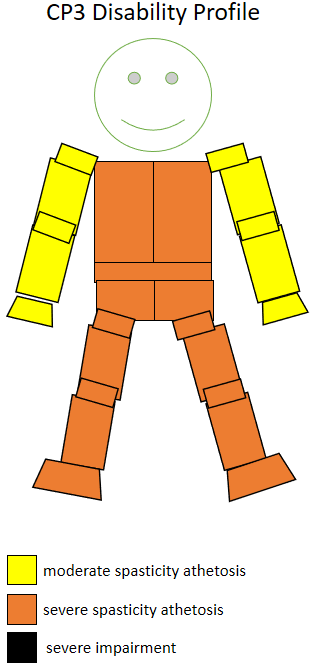
The spasticity athetosis level and location of a CP3 sportsperson.

One of the disability groups in this classification is swimmers with cerebral palsy, including CP3 classified swimmers.

On a daily basis, CP3 sportspeople are likely to use a wheelchair. Some may be ambulant with the use of assistive devices. While they may have good trunk control, they may have some issues with strong forward movements of their torso. While CP2, CP3 and CP6 have similar issues with Athetoid or Ataxic, CP6 competitors have "flight" while they are ambulant in that it is possible for both feet to not be touching the ground while walking. CP2 and CP3 are unable to do this. Head movement and trunk function differentiate this class from CP4. Lack of symmetry in arm movement are another major difference between the two classes, with CP3 competitors having less symmetry.

CP3 swimmers tend to have a passive normalized drag in the range of 0.9 to 1.1. This puts them into the passive drag band of PDB3, and PDB5. Because the disability of swimmers in this class involves in a loss of function in specific parts of their body, they are more prone to injury than their able-bodied counterparts as a result of overcompensation in other parts of their body. When fatigued, asymmetry in their stroke becomes a problem for swimmers in this class.

=== Spinal cord injuries ===
People with spinal cord injuries compete in this class, including F2, F3, F4, F5 sportspeople.

==== F2 ====
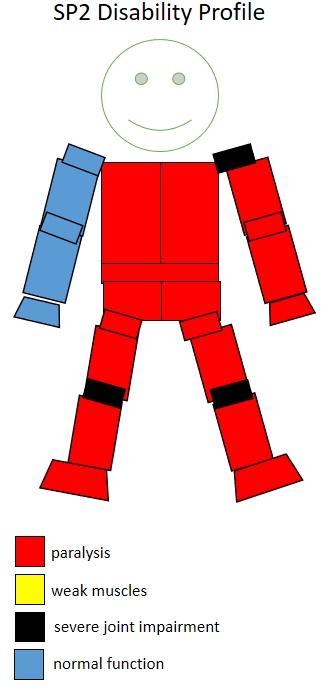
Functional profile of a wheelchair sportsperson in the F2 class.

This is wheelchair sport classification that corresponds to the neurological level C7. In the past, this class was known as 1B Complete, 1A Incomplete. The location of lesions on different vertebrae tend to be associated with disability levels and functionality issues. C7 is associated with elbow flexors. C8 is associated with finger flexors. Disabled Sports USA defined the anatomical definition of this class in 2003 as, ""Have functional elbow flexors and extensors, wrist dorsi-flexors and palmar flexors. Have good shoulder muscle function. May have some finger flexion and extension but not functional." People with lesions at C7 have stabilization and extension of the elbow and some extension of the wrist. People with a lesion at C7 have an impairment that effects the use of their hands and lower arm. They can use a wheelchair using their own power, and do everyday tasks like eating, dressing, and normal physical maintenance. People in this class have a total respiratory capacity of 79% compared to people without a disability.

Swimming classification is done based on a total points system, with a variety of functional and medical tests being used as part of a formula to assign a class. Part of this test involves the Adapted Medical Research Council (MRC) scale. For upper trunk extension, C8 complete are given 0 points.

S3 swimmers tend to have 91 to 115 points, and, for people spinal cord injuries, are tetraplegics with complete lesions below C7 or an incomplete tetraplegic below C6. These S3 swimmers have leg drag when swimming as a result of their hips staying below the surface of the water during a race. Their hand usage is such that they cannot use them effectively to catch water. Because of their disability, they normally start in the water. They make turns by pushing off with their arms. People in SB3 tend to be incomplete tetraplegics below C7, complete paraplegics around T1 - T5, or complete paraplegics at T1 - T8 with surgical rods put in their spinal column from T4 to T6. These rods impact their lumbar function and their balance.

For swimming with the most severe disabilities at the 1984 Summer Paralympics, floating devices and a swimming coach in the water swimming next to the Paralympic competitor were allowed. A study of was done comparing the performance of athletics competitors at the 1984 Summer Paralympics. It found there was little significant difference in performance times between women in 1A (SP1, SP2), 1B (SP3), and 1C (SP3, SP4) in the 25m breaststroke. It found there was little significant difference in performance times between women in 1A (SP1, SP2), 1B (SP3), and 1C (SP3, SP4) in the 25m backstroke. It found there was little significant difference in performance times between women in 1A (SP1, SP2), 1B (SP3), and 1C (SP3, SP4) in the 25m freestyle. It found there was little significant difference in performance times between men in 1A (SP1, SP2), 1B (SP3), and 1C (SP3, SP4) in the 25m backstroke. It found there was little significant difference in performance times between men in 1A (SP1, SP2), 1B (SP3), and 1C (SP3, SP4) in the 25m freestyle. It found there was little significant difference in performance times between men in 1A (SP1, SP2), and 1B (SP3) in the 25m breaststroke.

==== F3 ====
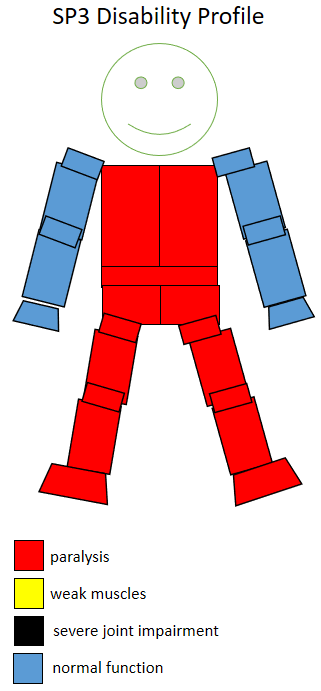
Functional profile of a wheelchair sportsperson in the F3 class.

This is wheelchair sport classification that corresponds to the neurological level C8. In the past, this class was known as 1C Complete, and 1B Incomplete. Disabled Sports USA defined the anatomical definition of this class in 2003 as, "Have full power at elbow and wrist joints. Have full or almost full power of finger flexion and extension. Have functional but not normal intrinsic muscles of the hand (demonstrable wasting)." People with a lesion at C8 have an impairment that effects the use of their hands and lower arm. Disabled Sports USA defined the functional definition of this class in 2003 as, "Have nearly normal grip with non-throwing arm." They have full functional control or close to full functional control over the muscles in their fingers, but may have issues with control in their wrist and hand. People in this class have a total respiratory capacity of 79% compared to people without a disability.

Swimming classification is done based on a total points system, with a variety of functional and medical tests being used as part of a formula to assign a class. Part of this test involves the Adapted Medical Research Council (MRC) scale. For upper trunk extension, C8 complete are given 0 points.

People in SB3 tend to be incomplete tetraplegics below C7, complete paraplegics around T1 - T5, or complete paraplegics at T1 - T8 with surgical rods put in their spinal column from T4 to T6. These rods impact their lumbar function and their balance.

For swimming with the most severe disabilities at the 1984 Summer Paralympics, floating devices and a swimming coach in the water swimming next to the Paralympic competitor were allowed. A study of was done comparing the performance of athletics competitors at the 1984 Summer Paralympics. It found there was little significant difference in performance times between women in 1A (SP1, SP2), 1B (SP3), and 1C (SP3, SP4) in the 25m breaststroke. It found there was little significant difference in performance times between women in 1A, 1B, and 1C in the 25m backstroke. It found there was little significant difference in performance times between women in 1A, 1B, and 1C in the 25m freestyle. It found there was little significant difference in performance times between men in 1A, 1B, and 1C in the 25m backstroke. It found there was little significant difference in performance times between men in 1A, 1B, and 1C in the 25m freestyle. It found there was little significant difference in performance times between men in 1A, and 1B in the 25m breaststroke.

==== F4 ====
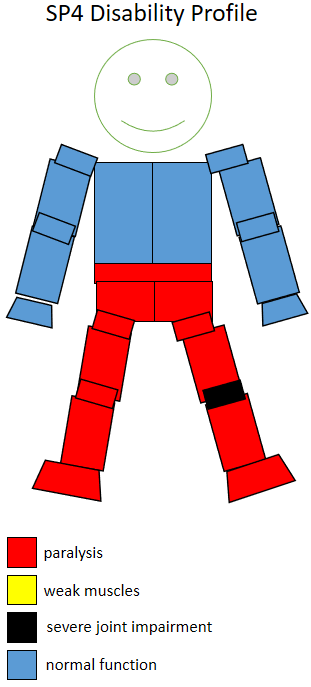
Functional profile of a wheelchair sportsperson in the F4 class.

This is wheelchair sport classification that corresponds to the neurological level T1- T7. In the past, this class was known as 1C Incomplete, 2 Complete, or Upper 3 Complete. F4 sportspeople may have good sitting balance and some impairment in their dominant hand. Disabled Sports USA defined the functional definition of this class in 2003 as, "Have no sitting balance. [...] Usually hold onto part of the chair while throwing. Complete Class 2 and upper Class 3 Athletes have normal upper limbs. They can hold the throwing implement normally. They have no functional trunk movements.Incomplete 1C Athletes who have trunk movements, with hand function like F3." People in this class have a total respiratory capacity of 85% compared to people without a disability.

Swimming classification is done based on a total points system, with a variety of functional and medical tests being used as part of a formula to assign a class. Part of this test involves the Adapted Medical Research Council (MRC) scale. For upper trunk extension, T1 - T5 complete are given 1 - 2 points while T6 - T10 are given 3 - 5 points.

People in SB3 tend to be incomplete tetraplegics below C7, complete paraplegics around T1 - T5, or complete paraplegics at T1 - T8 with surgical rods put in their spinal column from T4 to T6. These rods impact their lumbar function and their balance.

A study of was done comparing the performance of athletics competitors at the 1984 Summer Paralympics. It found there was little significant difference in performance times between women in 1A (SP1, SP2), 1B (SP3), and 1C (SP3, SP4) in the 25m breaststroke. It found there was little significant difference in performance times between women in 1A, and 1C in the 25m backstroke. It found there was little significant difference in performance times between women in 1A, 1B, and 1C in the 25m freestyle. It found there was little significant difference in performance times between men in 1A, 1B, and 1C in the 25m backstroke. It found there was little significant difference in performance times between men in 1A, 1B, and 1C in the 25m freestyle. It found there was little significant difference in performance times between women in 2 and 3 in the 50m breaststroke. It found there was little significant difference in performance times between men in 2 (SP4) and 3 (SP4, SP5) in the 50m breaststroke. It found there was little significant difference in performance times between women in 2 (SP4) and 3 (SP4, SP5) in the 50m freestyle. It found there was little significant difference in performance times between men in 2 and 3 in the 50m freestyle. It found there was little significant difference in performance times between men in 2 (SP4) and 3 (SP4, SP5) in the 50m backstroke. It found there was little significant difference in performance times between women in 2, 3 and 4 in the 25 m butterfly. It found there was little significant difference in performance times between men in 2, 3 and 4 in the 25 m butterfly.

==== F5 ====
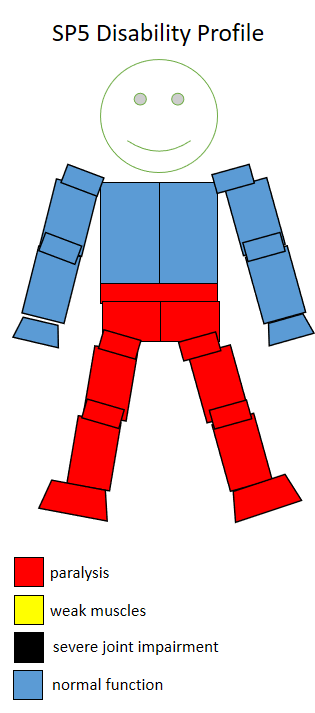
Functional profile of a wheelchair sportsperson in the F5 class.

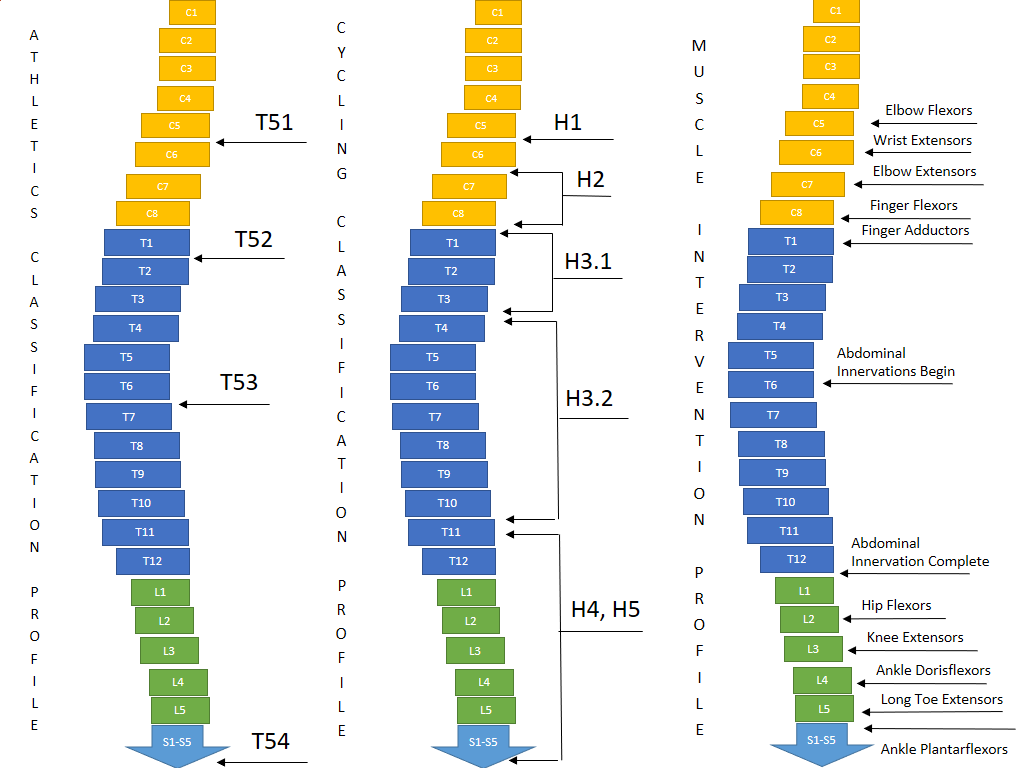
Comparing key muscle innervations for spinal cord levels compared to cycling and athletics classifications.

This is wheelchair sport classification that corresponds to the neurological level T8 - L1. In the past, this class was known as Lower 3, or Upper 4. Disabled Sports USA defined the anatomical definition of this class in 2003 as, "Normal upper limb function. Have abdominal muscles and spinal extensors (upper or more commonly upper and lower). May have non-functional hip flexors (grade 1). Have no abductor function."

People in this class have good sitting balance. People with lesions located between T9 and T12 have some loss of abdominal muscle control. Disabled Sports USA defined the functional definition of this class in 2003 as, "Three trunk movements may be seen in this class: 1) Off the back of a chair (in an upwards direction). 2) Movement in the backwards and forwards plane. 3) Some trunk rotation. They have fair to good sitting balance. They cannot have functional hip flexors, i.e. ability to lift the thigh upwards in the sitting position. They may have stiffness of the spine that improves balance but reduces the ability to rotate the spine."

Swimming classification is done based on a total points system, with a variety of functional and medical tests being used as part of a formula to assign a class. Part of this test involves the Adapted Medical Research Council (MRC) scale. For upper trunk extension, T6 - T10 are given 3 - 5 points.

People in SB3 tend to be incomplete tetraplegics below C7, complete paraplegics around T1 - T5, or complete paraplegics at T1 - T8 with surgical rods put in their spinal column from T4 to T6. These rods impact their lumbar function and their balance.

A study of was done comparing the performance of athletics competitors at the 1984 Summer Paralympics. It found there was little significant difference in performance times between women in 2 (SP4) and 3 (SP4, SP5) in the 50m breaststroke. It found there was little significant difference in performance times between men in 2 (SP4) and 3 (SP4, SP5) in the 50m breaststroke. It found there was little significant difference in performance times between women in 2 (SP4) and 3 (SP4, SP5) in the 50m freestyle. It found there was little significant difference in performance times between men in 2 (SP4) and 3 (SP4, SP5) in the 50m freestyle. It found there was little significant difference in performance times between men in 2 (SP4) and 3 (SP4, SP5) in the 50m backstroke. It found there was little significant difference in performance times between women in 4 (SP5, SP6), 5 (SP6, SP7) and 6 (SP7) in the 100m breaststroke. It found there was little significant difference in performance times between women in 4 (SP5, SP6), 5 (SP6, SP7) and 6 (SP7) in the 100m backstroke. It found there was little significant difference in performance times between women in 4 (SP5, SP6), 5 (SP6, SP7) and 6 (SP7) in the 100m freestyle. It found there was little significant difference in performance times between women in 4 (SP5, SP6), 5 (SP6, SP7) and 6 (SP7) in the 14 x 50 m individual medley. It found there was little significant difference in performance times between men in 4 (SP5, SP6), 5 (SP6, SP7) and 6 (SP7) in the 100m backstroke. It found there was little significant difference in performance times between men in 4 (SP5, SP6), 5 (SP6, SP7) and 6 (SP7) in the 100m breaststroke. It found there was little significant difference in performance times between women in 2 (SP4), 3 (SP4, SP5) and 4 (SP5, SP6) in the 25 m butterfly. It found there was little significant difference in performance times between men in 2 (SP4), 3 (SP4, SP5) and 4 (SP5, SP6) in the 25 m butterfly.

== At the Paralympic Games ==
For this classification, organisers of the Paralympic Games have the option of including the following events on the Paralympic programme: in the 50m and 100m Freestyle, 200m Freestyle, 50m Backstroke, 50m Butterfly, 50ms class for specific events.

Event	Class	Time		Name	Nation	Date	Games	Ref
50 m freestyle	S3	42.60	WR	Dmytro Vynohradets	Ukraine	Sep 13, 2008	2008 Beijing	

Legend: # – Record awaiting ratification by IPC; WR – World record;
Records not set in finals: h – heat; r – relay 1st leg; rh – relay heat 1st leg; so – swim-off

== Getting classified ==
Swimming classification generally has three components that CP3 sportspeople must go through. The first is a bench press. The second is water test. The third is in competition observation. As part of the water test, swimmers are often required to demonstrate their swimming technique for all four strokes. They usually swim a distance of 25 meters for each stroke. They are also generally required to demonstrate how they enter the water and how they turn in the pool.

In Australia, to be classified in this category, athletes contact the Australian Paralympic Committee or their state swimming governinLi and Byeong Eon Min who all won medals in their class at the 2008 Paralympics.

American swimmers who have been classified by the United States Paralympic Committee as being in this class include Celestine Davis, Elizabeth Kolbe, Katie Labahn and Greg Martin.
