= Football 7-a-side at the 2012 Summer Paralympics – Men's team squads =

The following is a list of squads for each nation competing in football 7-a-side at the 2012 Summer Paralympics in London.

== Group A ==
=== Argentina ===
The following is the Argentina squad in the football 7-a-side tournament of the 2012 Summer Paralympics.

No.	Pos.	Player	Age	Club
1		Gustavo Nahuelquin	33	D.P.L.
2		Mariano Morana	21	Cideli
3		Rodrigo Luquez	23	Club Perico de Jujuy
4		Ezequiel Jaime	28	D.P.L.
5		Brian Vivot	20	Avida
6		Claudio Figuera	24	D.P.L.
7		Carlos Ferreyra	23	Club Lujan de Jujuy
8		Marcos Salazar Robert	29	Club Lujan de Jujuy
9		Fabio Coria	20	D.P.L.
10		Rodrigo Lugrin	18	Avida
11		Matias Fernandez Romano	28	D.P.L.
12		Sergio Gutierrez	19	Cideli

=== Iran ===
The following is the Iran squad in the football 7-a-side tournament of the 2012 Summer Paralympics.

No.	Pos.	Player	Age	Club
1	GK	Mehran Nikoee Majd	30	Gilan
2	MF	Hashem Rastegarimobin	27	Zanjan
5	MF	Sadegh Hassani Baghi	28	Gilan
6	MF	Farzad Mehri	27	Zanjan
7	MF	Jasem Bakhshi	25	Gilan
8	DF	Ehsan Gholamhosseinpour Bousheh	23	Fars
9	DF	Morteza Heidari	34	Tehran
10	DF	Bahman Ansari	32	Markazi
11	FW	Rasoul Atashafrouz	30	Gilan
13	MF	Moslem Akbari	27	Gilan
19	FW	Abdolreza Karimizadeh	30	Khoozestan
22	GK	Moslem Khazaeipirsarabi	25	Kermanshah

=== Netherlands ===
The following is the Netherlands squad in the football 7-a-side tournament of the 2012 Summer Paralympics.

No.	Pos.	Player	Age	Club
1		Bart Adelaars	30	VV Braakhuizen
2		Jeroen Voogd	25	VV Desk
5		Lars Conijn	19	WSV 1930
6		Peter Kooij	25	VV Maarsen
7		Dennis Straatman	25	VVA Spartaan
9		John Swinkels	26	SV Ondo
10		Stephan Lokhoff	30	SV Heumen
11		Iljas Visker	20	TSC '04
14		Daan Dicken	21	RKVV Meerwijk
15		Joey Mense	22	SV Lochem
17		Abel Walraven	20	Eendracht Mook
23		George van Altena	24	VV Marken

=== Russia ===
The following is the Russia squad in the football 7-a-side tournament of the 2012 Summer Paralympics.

No.	Pos.	Player	Age	Club
3		Aslanbek Sapiev	19	Stimul
6		Aleksey Tumakov	29	Lev Chernoy Olympia
7		Alexey Chesmin	26	Lev Chernoy Olympia
8		Ivan Potekhin	31	Lev Chernoy Olympia
9		Eduard Ramonov	28	Lev Chernoy Olympia
10		Andrei Kuvaev	29	Lev Chernoy Olympia
12		Alexander Lekov	44	Lev Chernoy Olympia
13		Lasha Murvanadze	30	Lev Chernoy Olympia
15		Viacheslav Larionov	22	Nizhegorodets
16		Vladislav Raretskii	19	Lev Chernoy Olympia
17		Zaurbek Pagaev	20	Stimul
18		Aleksandr Kuligin	21	Nizhegorodets

== Group B ==
=== Brazil ===
The following is the Brazil squad in the football 7-a-side tournament of the 2012 Summer Paralympics.

No.	Pos.	Player	Age	Club
1		Marcos dos Santos Ferreira	34	Caira
2		Ronaldo Almeida de Souza	22	ADD
3		Fernandes Celso Alves Vieira	33	Caira
4		Jose Carlos Monteiro Guimaraes	34	Botafogo Clube Superar
5		Marcos Yuri Cabral da Costa	18	Vasco da Gama
6		Mateus Francisco Tostes Calvo	22	Botafogo Clube Superar
7		Fabio da Silva Bordignon	20	Botafogo Clube Superar
8		Yurig Gregory dos Santos Ribeiro	23	Botafogo Clube Superar
9		Luciano da Costa Silva	22	Botafogo Clube Superar
10		Wanderson Silva de Oliveira	25	Botafogo Clube Superar
11		Jan Francisco Brito da Costa	25	Botafogo Clube Superar
12		Jorge Luiz da Silva	32	Botafogo Clube Superar

=== Great Britain ===
The following is the Great Britain squad in the football 7-a-side tournament of the 2012 Summer Paralympics.

No.	Pos.	Player	Age	Club
1	GK	Craig Connell	23
2	DF	Blair Glynn	26
3	MF	Matthew Ellis	32
4	DF	Matthew Dimbylow	41
5	MF	James Richmond	32
6	FW	Alistair Patrick-Heselton	29
7	FW	Michael Barker	25
8	DF	Martin Sinclair	26
9	MF	George Fletcher	17
10	MF	Jonny Paterson	24
11	MF	Ibrahima Diallo	19
13	GK	Billy Thompson	29

=== Ukraine ===
The following is the Ukraine squad in the football 7-a-side tournament of the 2012 Summer Paralympics.

No.	Pos.	Player	Age	Club
1		Kostyantyn Symashko	32	Dnipropetrovsk regional team
2		Vitaliy Trushev	29	Khmelnytsy regional team
3		Yevhen Zinoviev	24	Dnipropetrovsk regional team
4		Taras Dutko	30	Dnipropetrovsk regional team
5		Anatolii Shevchyk	28	Volyn regional team
6		Ivan Shkvarlo	24	Volyn regional team
7		Ivan Dotsenko	28	Dnipropetrovsk regional team
8		Denys Ponomariov	27	Dnipropetrovsk regional team
9		Oleksiy Hetun	30	Volyn regional team
10		Oleksandr Devlysh	26	Khmelnytsy regional team
11		Volodymyr Antoniuk	33	Khmelnytsy regional team
12		Ihor Kosenko	35	Rivne regional team

=== United States ===
The following is the United States squad in the football 7-a-side tournament of the 2012 Summer Paralympics.

No.	Pos.	Player	Age	Club
1	GK	Keith Johnson	32
2	DF	Gavin Sibayan	31
3	MF	Jerreme Wade	22
4	MF	Chad Jones	20
5	DF	Bryce Boarman	22
6	DF	Chris Ahrens	28
7	MF	Adam Ballou	20
8	FW	Rene Renteria	24
9	MF	Josh McKinney	33
10	MF	Marthell Vazquez	25
11	MF	Tyler Bennett	20
12	GK	Alex Hendricks	16

== See also ==
- Football 5-a-side at the 2012 Summer Paralympics – Team squads
