= 2010 CPISRA Football 7-a-side European Championships =

Tournament details
- Host country: Scotland
- Dates: 17 – 28 August 2010
- Teams: 10
- Venue: 1 (in 1 host city)

Final positions
- Champions: Ukraine (4th title)
- Runners-up: Russia
- Third place: (Republic of Ireland) Ireland
- Fourth place: Netherlands

Tournament statistics
- Matches played: 29
- Goals scored: 166 (5.72 per match)

The 2010 CPISRA Football 7-a-side European Championships was the European championship for men's national 7-a-side association football teams. CPISRA stands for Cerebral Palsy International Sports & Recreation Association. Athletes with cerebral palsy and related neurological conditions competed in the Championships. The Championships took place in Scotland from 17 to 28 August 2010.

Football 7-a-side was played with modified FIFA rules. Among the modifications were that there were seven players, no offside, a smaller playing field, and permission for one-handed throw-ins. Matches consisted of two thirty-minute halves, with a fifteen-minute half-time break. The Championships was a qualifying event for the 2011 CPISRA Football 7-a-side World Championships.

== Participating teams and officials ==
=== Teams ===
Means of qualification	Berths	Qualified
Host nation	1	Scotland
European Region	8	Denmark; England; Finland (Republic of Ireland) Ireland; Netherlands; Russia; Spain; Ukraine
Oceania Region	1	Australia
Total	10	

=== The draw ===
During the draw, the teams were divided into pots because of rankings. Here, the following groups:

	Group A	Group B
Pot 1	Russia	Ukraine
Pot 2	Netherlands	(Republic of Ireland) Ireland
Pot 3	Scotland	England
Pot 4	Spain	Australia
Pot 5	Denmark	Finland

=== Squads ===
The individual teams contact following football gamblers on to:

Group A

Russia	Netherlands	Scotland	Spain	Denmark
3 Aslanbek Sapiev; 4 Pavel Borisov; 5 Georgy Nadzharyan; 6 Aleksey Tumakov; 7 Alexey Chesmin; 8 Ivan Potekhin; 9 Andrei Zinovev; 10 Andrey Kuvaev; 11 Stanislav Kolykhalov; 12 Alexander Lekov; 13 Lasha Murvanadze; 15 Viacheslav Larionov	1 Rudy van Breemen; 4 Jeffrey Bruinier; 5 Lars Conijn; 6 Hendrikus van Kempen; 7 Johannes Straatman; 8 Pawel Statema; 9 Johannes Swinkels; 10 Stephan Lokhoff; 11 Iljas Visker; 14 Daniël Dikken; 15 Joey Mense; 16 Bart Adelaars	1 Craig Connell; 2 Graeme Paterson; 3 Laurie McGinley; 4 Blair Glynn; 5 Scott Troup; 6 Jamie Tervit; 7 Mark Robertson; 8 Jim McKay; 9 Anton Clark; 10 Jonathan Paterson; 11 Ross Russell; 13 Conor Hay	1 Jorge Peleteiro; 2 Sergio Álvarez; 3 Jordi López; 4 Ramón Del Pino; 5 Carlos Antón; 6 Roberto Ortiz; 7 Sergio Clemente; 8 Carlos Rodríguez; 9 Raúl Pacheco; 10 Ivan Vazquez; 11 Pedro Rocha; 12 Omar Álvarez	1 Jonas Sørensen; 2 Mikkel Munkholm; 3 Per Mørch; 4 Peter Hansen; 5 Claus Pape; 6 Mads Tofte; 7 Jacob Voetmann; 9 Nikolaj Jartved; 10 Michael Lundstrøm; 14 Emil Nørlund; 15 Kim Beck

Group B

Ukraine	(Republic of Ireland) Ireland	England	Australia	Finland
1 Kostyantyn Symashko; 2 Vitaliy Trushev; 3 Serhiy Vakulenko; 4 Taras Dutko; 5 Anatolii Shevchyk; 6 Ivan Shkvarlo; 7 Andriy Tsukanov; 8 Denys Ponomaryov; 9 Mykola Mikhovych; 10 Oleksandr Devlysh; 11 Volodymyr Antonyuk; 12 Oleksiy Hetun	1 Brian Mc Gillivary; 2 Aidan Brennan; 3 Paul Dollard; 4 Luke Evans; 5 Finbar O'Riordan; 6 Derek Malone; 7 Gary Messett; 8 Joseph Markey; 9 Jason Moran; 10 Mark Jones; 11 Daragh Snell; 12 Darren Kavanagh	2 Sam Whatley; 3 Josh Beacham; 4 Matthew Dimbylow; 5 Karl Townshend; 6 Richard Fox; 7 Michael Barker; 8 Martin Sinclair; 9 Graham Leclerc; 10 Emyle Rudder; 11 Robert Hughes; 12 George Fletcher	1 Sam Larkings; 2 Ben Roche; 3 Jack Williams; 4 Ned McCabe; 5 Jarrod Law; 6 Chris Pyne; 7 David Barber; 8 Brett Fairhall; 9 Ben Atkins; 10 Thomas Goodman; 11 Jamie Laybutt; 12 Jamie Paulsen	1 Jaakko Seppälä; 2 Henri Forrs; 3 Jussi Wiljami Laurila; 4 Janne Inkilä; 5 Bulcsu Szekely; 7 Jussi Tuominen; 8 Mikael Jukarainen; 9 Janne Helander; 10 Johannes Siikonen; 14 Pyry Nopsanen

== Venues ==
The venues to be used for the European Championships were located in Glasgow.

Glasgow	2010 CPISRA Football 7-a-side European Championships is located in Scotland
Stadium: unknown	2010 CPISRA Football 7-a-side European Championships is located in Scotland
Capacity: unknown	2010 CPISRA Football 7-a-side European Championships is located in Scotland

== Format ==
The first round, or group stage, was a competition between the 10 teams divided among two groups of five, where each group engaged in a round-robin tournament within itself. The two highest ranked teams in each group advanced to the knockout stage for the position one to four. The next two teams played for the position five to eight. The last teams played for the position nine to ten. Teams were awarded three points for a win and one for a draw. When comparing teams in a group over-all result came before head-to-head.

Tie-breaking criteria for group play
The ranking of teams in each group was based on the following criteria:
1. Number of points
2. Goal difference
3. Number of goals scored
4. Number of points obtained in matches between tied teams
5. Goal difference in matches between tied teams
6. Number of goals scored in matches between tied teams
7. Drawing of lots

In the knockout stage there were two rounds (semi-finals, and the final). The winners plays for the higher positions, the losers for the lower positions. For any match in the knockout stage, a draw after 60 minutes of regulation time was followed by two 10 minute periods of extra time to determine a winner. If the teams were still tied, a penalty shoot-out was held to determine a winner.

Classification
Athletes with a physical disability competed. The athlete's disability was caused by a non-progressive brain damage that affects motor control, such as cerebral palsy, traumatic brain injury or stroke. Athletes must be ambulant.

Players were classified by level of disability.

- C5: Athletes with difficulties when walking and running, but not in standing or when kicking the ball.
- C6: Athletes with control and co-ordination problems of their upper limbs, especially when running.
- C7: Athletes with hemiplegia.
- C8: Athletes with minimal disability; must meet eligibility criteria and have an impairment that has impact on the sport of football.

Teams must field at least one class C5 or C6 player at all times. No more than two players of class C8 are permitted to play at the same time.

== Group stage ==
The first round, or group stage, have seen the ten teams divided into two groups of five teams.

=== Group A ===
Pos	Team	Pld	W	D	L	GF	GA	GD	Pts	Qualified for
1	Russia	4	4	0	0	23	0	+23	12	Team play for the position 1 - 4
2	Netherlands	4	3	0	1	24	7	+17	9	Team play for the position 1 - 4
3	Scotland	4	2	0	2	11	9	+2	6	Team play for the position 5 - 8
4	Spain	4	1	0	3	6	16	−10	3	Team play for the position 5 - 8
5	Denmark	4	0	0	4	0	32	−32	0	Team play for the position 9 - 10

Source: CPISRA Football 7-a-side European Championships, Glasgow, August 2010
Rules for classification: Tie-breaking criteria
17 August 2010

Scotland	9–0	Denmark

18 August 2010

Russia	6–0	Spain

18 August 2010

Netherlands	2–0	Scotland

19 August 2010

Denmark	0–6	Spain

19 August 2010

Netherlands	0–7	Russia

21 August 2010

Russia	3–0	Denmark

21 August 2010

Spain	0–2	Scotland

22 August 2010

Spain	0–8	Netherlands

23 August 2010

Scotland	0–7	Russia

23 August 2010

Denmark	0–14	Netherlands

=== Group B ===
Pos	Team	Pld	W	D	L	GF	GA	GD	Pts	Qualified for
1	Ukraine	4	4	0	0	26	1	+25	12	Team play for the position 1 - 4
2	(Republic of Ireland) Ireland	4	3	0	1	15	4	+11	9	Team play for the position 1 - 4
3	England	4	2	0	2	18	12	+6	6	Team play for the position 5 - 8
4	Australia	4	1	0	3	5	24	−19	3	Team play for the position 5 - 8
5	Finland	4	0	0	4	1	24	−23	0	Team play for the position 9 - 10

Source: CPISRA Football 7-a-side European Championships, Glasgow, August 2010
Rules for classification: Tie-breaking criteria
17 August 2010

Australia	0–5	(Republic of Ireland) Ireland

17 August 2010

England	12–0	Finland

18 August 2010

Ukraine	12–1	Australia

18 August 2010

(Republic of Ireland) Ireland	6–0	England

20 August 2010

Finland	1–4	Australia

20 August 2010

(Republic of Ireland) Ireland	0–4	Ukraine
	Report	Taras Dutko, Volodymyr Antonyuk, ...

22 August 2010

Ukraine	4–0	Finland

22 August 2010

Australia	0–6	England

23 August 2010

Finland	0–4	(Republic of Ireland) Ireland

23 August 2010

England	0–6	Ukraine

== Knockout stage ==
=== Semi-finals ===
Position 5-8

25 August 2010

Scotland	7–1	Australia

25 August 2010

England	8–0	Spain

Position 1-4

26 August 2010

Russia	3–0	(Republic of Ireland) Ireland

26 August 2010

Ukraine	4–1	Netherlands

== Finals ==
Position 9-10

27 August 2010

Denmark	3–2	Finland

Position 7-8

27 August 2010

Australia	0–4	Spain

Position 5-6

27 August 2010

Scotland	1–0	England

Position 3-4

27 August 2010

(Republic of Ireland) Ireland	2–0	Netherlands

Final

28 August 2010

Russia	1–1	Ukraine
	Report	Volodymyr Antonyuk
Penalties
	(7–8p)

== Statistics ==
=== Ranking ===
Rank	Team
Gold medal	Ukraine
Silver medal	Russia
Bronze medal	(Republic of Ireland) Ireland
4.	Netherlands
5.	Scotland
6.	England
7.	Spain
8.	Australia
9.	Denmark
10.	Finland
