= 2009 CPISRA Football 7-a-side International Championships =

Tournament details
- Host country: Netherlands
- Dates: 23 October – 1 November 2009
- Teams: 12
- Venue(s): 1 (in 1 host city)

Final positions
- Champions: Ukraine
- Runners-up: Russia
- Third place: Iran
- Fourth place: Brazil

Tournament statistics
- Matches played: 31
- Goals scored: 176 (5.68 per match)
- Top scorer(s): (Iran) Abdolreza Karimizadeh (13)

The 2009 CPISRA Football 7-a-side International Championships was an international championship for men's national 7-a-side association football teams. CPISRA stands for Cerebral Palsy International Sports & Recreation Association. Athletes with a physical disability competed. The Championship took place in the Netherlands from 23 October to 1 November 2009.

Football 7-a-side was played with modified FIFA rules. Among the modifications were that there were seven players, no offside, a smaller playing field, and permission for one-handed throw-ins. Matches consisted of two thirty-minute halves, with a fifteen-minute half-time break. The Championships was a qualifying event for the 2011 CPISRA Football 7-a-side World Championships.

== Participating teams and officials ==
=== Qualifying ===
The following teams are qualified for the tournament:

Means of qualification	Date	Venue	Berths	Qualified
Host nation			2	Netherlands; Netherlands O19
2007 ParaPan American Games	13 August – 19 August 2007	Rio de Janeiro, Brazil	3	Brazil; Canada; United States
2006 FESPIC Games	25 November – 1 December 2006	Kuala Lumpur, Malaysia	2	Iran; Japan
2006 European Championships	21 – 28 July 2006	(Republic of Ireland) Dublin, Ireland	4	(Republic of Ireland) Ireland; Russia; Scotland; Ukraine
Oceania Region			1	Australia
Total			12	

=== The draw ===
During the draw, the teams were divided into pots because of rankings. Here, the following groups:

	Group A	Group B	Group C	Group D
Pot 1	Ukraine	Russia	Iran	Brazil
Pot 2	(Republic of Ireland) Ireland	Scotland	Netherlands	Australia
Pot 3	Netherlands O19	United States	Canada	Japan

=== Squads ===
The individual teams contact following football gamblers on to:

Group A

Ukraine	(Republic of Ireland) Ireland	Netherlands O19
1 Kostyantyn Symashko; 2 Vitaliy Trushev; 3 Serhiy Vakulenko; 4 Taras Dutko; 5 Anatolii Shevchyk; 6 Ivan Shkvarlo; 7 Andriy Tsukanov; 8 Denys Ponomaryov; 9 Mykola Mikhovych; 11 Volodymyr Antonyuk; 10 Oleksandr Devlysh; 12 Ihor Kosenko	1 Brian Mc Gillivary; 2 Aidan Brennan; 3 Paul Dollard; 4 Luke Evans; 5 Finbar O’Riordan; 6 Mark Jones; 6 Gary Messett; 8 Dara Snell; 9 Kieran Devlin; 10 Darren Kavanagh; 11 Joseph Markey; 12 Chris Kirwan	
Coach: Sergiy Ovcharenko	Coach: Paul Cassin	

Group B

Russia	Scotland	United States
1 Oleg Smirnov; 2 Andrey Lozhechnikov; 4 Pavel Borisov; 5 Georgy Nadzharyan; 6 Aleksey Tumakov; 7 Alexey Chesmin; 8 Ivan Pothekin; 9 Mamuka Dzimistarishvili; 11 Stanislav Kloykhalov; 12 Alexander Lekov; 13 Lasha Murvanadze; 15 Viacheslav Larionov	1 Craig Connell; 2 Kieran Martin; 3 Chris Nelson; 4 Scott Troup; 5 Jamie Tervit; 6 Graeme Paterson; 8 Connor Hay; 9 Jonathan Paterson; 10 Laurie McGinley; 11 Riley McKenna; 13 Keith Gardner	1 Keith Johnson; 2 Nick Creasey; 3 Jason Slemons; 4 Chad Jones; 5 Bryce Boarman; 6 Chris Ahrens; 7 Adam Ballou; 8 Tom Latsch; 9 Josh McKinney; 10 Marthell Vazquez; 13 Tyler Penn; 15 Moises Morales
Coach: Avtandil Baramidze	Coach: Stuart Sharp	Coach: Jay Hoffman

Group C

Iran	Netherlands	Canada
1 Mehran Nikoee Majd; 2 Bahman Ansari; 4 Gholamreza Najafi; 5 Hadi Safari; 6 Behnam Sohrabi Bagherabadi; 7 Rasoul Atashafruz; 8 Ehsan Gholamhossein-pour Bousheri; 10 Abdolreza Karimizadeh; 11 Morteza Heidari; 13 Moslem Akbari; 22 Ardeshir Mahini	1 Rudi van Breemen; 4 Jeffrey Bruinier; 5 Joey Mense; 6 Patrick van Kempen; 7 Dennis Straatman; 8 Pawel Statema; 9 John Swinkels; 10 Stephan Lokhoff; 11 Martijn van de Ven; 14 Daan Dikken; 16 Bart Adelaars; 18 Gerard Arends	1 Cameron Kleimer; 2 Todd Philips; 3 John Philips; 4 Christopher Duehrsen; 5 Scott van den Boogaard; 6 Sefik Smajlovic; 7 Dustin Hodgson; 8 James Jordon; 9 Eric Flemming; 10 Vito Proietti; 11 Matthew Brown; 12 Zack Murdock
Coach: Amin Allah Mani	Coach: Marcel Geestman	Coach: Drew Ferguson

Group D

Brazil	Australia	Japan
1 Delcio Costa; 2 Jean Rodrigues; 3 Leandro Marinho; 4 Antonio Rocha; 5 Jose Guimaraes; 6 Claudemar Lima; 7 Jean Silva; 8 Wanderson Silva de Oliveira; 10 Renato Lima; 11 Mateus Calvo; 12 Moisés Tamiozzo das Silva; 13 Pedro Santos Jr.	1 Sam Larkings; 2 Jarrod Law; 3 Patrick Grant; 4 Aidan Bennison; 5 Brett Cross; 6 Daniel Berry; 7 Ned McCabe; 8 Brett Fairhall; 9 Ben Atkins; 10 Thomas Goodman; 11 Jamie Laybutt; 12 Jamie Paulsen	2 Tatsuya Ihara; 3 Yasuhiro Yamaguchi; 4 Koji Watarai; 5 Nobuyuki Suzuki; 6 Yuji Yamada; 7 Rikiya Sakai; 8 Taisei Taniguchi; 9 Jun Okada; 10 Tsukasa Kawano; 11 Keisuke Kawabe; 12 Takayuki Iwasa
Coach: Paulo Cruz	Coach: Paul Brown	Coach: Yukio Jin

== Venues ==
The venues to be used for the International Championships were located in Arnhem.

Arnhem	2009 CPISRA Football 7-a-side International Championships is located in Netherlands
National Sports Centre Papendal (Vitesse Arnhem)	2009 CPISRA Football 7-a-side International Championships is located in Netherlands
Capacity: unknown	2009 CPISRA Football 7-a-side International Championships is located in Netherlands

== Format ==
The first round, the first group stage, was a competition between the 12 teams divided among four groups of three, where each group engaged in a round-robin tournament within itself. The two highest ranked teams in each group advanced to the second group stage for the position one to eight. the two lower ranked teams plays for the positions nine to 32. Teams were awarded three points for a win and one for a draw. When comparing teams in a group over-all result came before head-to-head.

Tie-breaking criteria for group play
The ranking of teams in each group was based on the following criteria:
1. Number of points
2. Goal difference
3. Number of goals scored
4. Number of points obtained in matches between tied teams
5. Goal difference in matches between tied teams
6. Number of goals scored in matches between tied teams
7. Drawing of lots

In the second round, the second group stage, the two groups, each with four teams, fighting for the positions one to eight, the first placed of the two groups played in the finals around the victory of the tournament, the second place around the third place, the third place around the fifth place and the last plays around the seventh place. The five last placed, one from group 1, group 3 and group 4 and two from group 2 plays everyone against everyone. The first placed is the ninth of the tournament, the second-place finishes the tenth, the third-place finishes the eleventh, the fourth place the twelfth and the fifth place the thirteenth. For any match in the finals, a draw after 60 minutes of regulation time was followed by two 10 minute periods of extra time to determine a winner. If the teams were still tied, a penalty shoot-out was held to determine a winner.

Classification
Athletes with a physical disability competed. The athlete's disability was caused by a non-progressive brain damage that affects motor control, such as cerebral palsy, traumatic brain injury or stroke. Athletes must be ambulant.

Players were classified by level of disability.

- C5: Athletes with difficulties when walking and running, but not in standing or when kicking the ball.
- C6: Athletes with control and co-ordination problems of their upper limbs, especially when running.
- C7: Athletes with hemiplegia.
- C8: Athletes with minimal disability; must meet eligibility criteria and have an impairment that has impact on the sport of football.

Teams must field at least one class C5 or C6 player at all times. No more than two players of class C8 are permitted to play at the same time.

== First Group stage ==
The first round, or group stage, have seen the sixteen teams divided into four groups of four teams.

=== Group A ===
Pos	Team	Pld	W	D	L	GF	GA	GD	Pts	Qualified for
1	Ukraine	2	2	0	0	13	2	+11	6	Round 2 (2nd Group stage)
2	(Republic of Ireland) Ireland	2	1	0	1	4	6	−2	3	Round 2 (2nd Group stage)
3	Netherlands O19	2	0	0	2	2	11	−9	0	drop out of the tournament

Source: 2009 CPISRA Football 7-a-side International Championships
Rules for classification: Tie-breaking criteria
23 October 2009
10:00

Ukraine	8–1	Netherlands O19
	no report

National Sports Centre Papendal
24 October 2009
10:00

(Republic of Ireland) Ireland	1–5	Ukraine
Evans 4'	Report	Shevchyk 14', 31', 36', 39'; Shkvarlo 49'

National Sports Centre Papendal
25 October 2009
10:00

Netherlands O19	1–3	(Republic of Ireland) Ireland
	no report

National Sports Centre Papendal

=== Group B ===
Pos	Team	Pld	W	D	L	GF	GA	GD	Pts	Qualified for
1	Russia	2	2	0	0	11	0	+11	6	Round 2 (2nd Group stage)
2	Scotland	2	1	0	1	2	7	−5	3	Round 2 (2nd Group stage)
3	United States	2	0	0	2	1	7	−6	0	Team play for the position 9 - 11

Source: 2009 CPISRA Football 7-a-side International Championships
Rules for classification: Tie-breaking criteria
23 October 2009
11:30

Russia	5–0	United States
Pothekin 8', 9', 11', 11'; Chesmin 50'	Report

National Sports Centre Papendal
24 October 2009
11:30

Scotland	0–6	Russia
	Report	Tumakov 7'; Pothekin 12'; Chesmin 23'; Kloykhalov 28'; Nadzharyan 34'; Dzimistarishvili 58'

National Sports Centre Papendal
25 October 2009
11:30

United States	1–2	Scotland
Ballou 2'	Report	Tervit 27'; McGinley 35'

National Sports Centre Papendal

=== Group C ===
Pos	Team	Pld	W	D	L	GF	GA	GD	Pts	Qualified for
1	Iran	2	2	0	0	8	3	+5	6	Round 2 (2nd Group stage)
2	Netherlands	2	1	0	1	5	3	+2	3	Round 2 (2nd Group stage)
3	Canada	2	0	0	2	1	8	−7	0	Team play for the position 9 - 11

Source: 2009 CPISRA Football 7-a-side International Championships
Rules for classification: Tie-breaking criteria
23 October 2009
13:00

Iran	5–1	Canada
Akbari 30', 32'; Gholamhossein-pour Bousheri 30+2'; Ansari 52'; Karimizadeh 54'	Report	Smajlovic 18'

National Sports Centre Papendal
24 October 2009
13:00

Netherlands	2–3	Iran
Swinkels 17'; Lokhoff 48'	Report	Ansari 34', 39', 44'

National Sports Centre Papendal
25 October 2009
13:00

Canada	0–3	Netherlands
	Report	van de Ven 4'; Lokhoff 27'; Swinkels 47'

National Sports Centre Papendal

=== Group D ===
Pos	Team	Pld	W	D	L	GF	GA	GD	Pts	Qualified for
1	Brazil	2	2	0	0	20	0	+20	6	Round 2 (2nd Group stage)
2	Australia	2	1	0	1	5	10	−5	3	Round 2 (2nd Group stage)
3	Japan	2	0	0	2	0	15	−15	0	Team play for the position 9 - 11

Source: 2009 CPISRA Football 7-a-side International Championships
Rules for classification: Tie-breaking criteria
23 October 2009
14:30

Brazil	10–0	Japan
Rocha 4', 17'; Silva 5'; Silva de Oliveira 6', 16'; Santos Jr. 11'; C. Lima 26', 33', 53'; Calvo 60'	Report

National Sports Centre Papendal
24 October 2009
14:30

Australia	0–10	Brazil
	Report	Guimaraes 8', 34'; Rocha 9', 41'; W. Silva de Oliveira 17'; R. Lima 19', 24', 25', 50', 57'

National Sports Centre Papendal
25 October 2009
14:30

Japan	0–5	Australia
	Report	Larkings 4'; Laybutt 23'; Paulsen 25'; Law 29'; Goodman 58'

National Sports Centre Papendal

== Second Group stage ==
=== Group W ===
Pos	Team	Pld	W	D	L	GF	GA	GD	Pts	
1	Ukraine	3	3	0	0	13	2	+11	9	Team play for the position 1
2	Brazil	3	2	0	1	11	7	+4	6	Team play for the position 3
3	Netherlands	3	1	0	2	7	9	−2	3	Team play for the position 5
4	Scotland	3	0	0	3	0	13	−13	0	Team play for the position 7

Source: 2009 CPISRA Football 7-a-side International Championships
Rules for classification: Tie-breaking criteria
27 October 2009
10:00

Ukraine	4–0	Scotland
Troup 5' (o.g.); Tsukanov 10'; Dutko 11', 47'	Report

National Sports Centre Papendal
27 October 2009
13:15

Netherlands	2–5	Brazil
Swinkels 49' van Kempen 60+3'	Report	Rodrigues 20'; W. Silva de Oliveira 22', 56'; R. Lima 25', 59'

National Sports Centre Papendal
28 October 2009
10:00

Ukraine	4–1	Netherlands
Dutko 6', 30+2'; Shevchyk 27'; Ponomaryov 45'	Report	Swinkels 40'

National Sports Centre Papendal
28 October 2009
13:15

Brazil	5–0	Scotland
Marinho 23'; J. Paterson 48' (o.g.); W. Silva de Oliveira 54', 55'; R. Lima 58'	Report

National Sports Centre Papendal
29 October 2009
10:00

Brazil	1–5	Ukraine
W. Silva de Oliveira 54'	Report	Tsukanov 17', 43'; Antonyuk 22', 52'; Ponomaryov 58'

National Sports Centre Papendal
29 October 2009
10:00

Scotland	0–4	Netherlands
	Report	Straatman 28', 57'; Swinkels 30'; G. Paterson 50' (o.g.)

National Sports Centre Papendal

=== Group X ===
Pos	Team	Pld	W	D	L	GF	GA	GD	Pts	Qualified for
1	Russia	3	3	0	0	16	1	+15	9	Team play for the position 1
2	Iran	3	2	0	1	20	3	+17	6	Team play for the position 3
3	(Republic of Ireland) Ireland	3	1	0	2	10	16	−6	3	Team play for the position 5
4	Australia	3	0	0	3	1	27	−26	0	Team play for the position 7

Source: 2009 CPISRA Football 7-a-side International Championships
Rules for classification: Tie-breaking criteria
27 October 2009
10:30

(Republic of Ireland) Ireland	0–8	Russia
	Report	Pothekin 14', 32', 45'; Larionov 16'; Chesmin 18', 23'; Kloykhalov 20'; Borisov 48'

National Sports Centre Papendal
27 October 2009
15:30

Iran	12–0	Australia
Ansari 4'; Karimizadeh 6', 12', 14', 18', 26', 29', 33', 36', 45'; Safari 32'; Najafi 50'	Report

National Sports Centre Papendal
28 October 2009
10:30

(Republic of Ireland) Ireland	0–8	Iran
	Report	Gholamhossein-pour Bousheri 3', 33'; Karimizadeh 7', 56', 60'; Heidari 8'; Ansari 29', 57'

National Sports Centre Papendal
28 October 2009
15:30

Australia	1–5	Russia
Chesmin 37' (o.g.)	Report	Larionov 3'; Dzimistarishvili 18'; Borisov 27'; Kloykhalov 46'; Nadzharyan 48'

National Sports Centre Papendal
29 October 2009
13:00

Australia	0–10	(Republic of Ireland) Ireland
	Report	Evans 2', 43'; O'Riordan 14', 30', 32'; Messett 15', 39'; Dollard 28'; Jones 52'; Kavanagh 57'

National Sports Centre Papendal
29 October 2009
13:00

Russia	3–0	Iran
Najafi 15' (o.g.); Kloykhalov 45', 51'	Report

National Sports Centre Papendal

=== Group Y ===
Position 9-11

Pos	Team	Pld	W	D	L	GF	GA	GD	Pts	Position
1	Canada	2	2	0	0	11	0	+11	6	position 9
2	United States	2	1	0	1	5	3	+2	3	position 10
3	Japan	2	0	0	2	0	13	−13	0	position 11

Source: 2009 CPISRA Football 7-a-side International Championships
Rules for classification: Tie-breaking criteria
27 October 2009
12:45

United States	0–3	Canada
	Report	Proietti 15'; Smajlovic 24', 34'

National Sports Centre Papendal
28 October 2009
12:45

United States	5–0	Japan
Vazquez 10', 30'; Jones 21'; Ballou 22', 29'	Report

National Sports Centre Papendal
25 October 2009
15:30

Canada	8–0	Japan
Smajlovic 2', 16'; Jordon 11'; Hodgson 19', 43'; Proietti 24' van den Boogaard 36'; Murdock 58'	Report

National Sports Centre Papendal

== Finals ==
Position 7-8

31 October 2009
10:00

Scotland	5–1	Australia
J. Paterson 10', 19'; G. Paterson 23', 50'; Gardner 45'	Report	Berry 37'

National Sports Centre Papendal

Position 5-6

31 October 2009
10:00

Netherlands	1–2	(Republic of Ireland) Ireland
Straatman 23'	Report	Evans 46', 54'

National Sports Centre Papendal

Position 3-4

31 October 2009
12:45

Brazil	0–1	Iran
	Report	Rodrigues 55' (o.g.)

National Sports Centre Papendal

Final

31 October 2009
15:30

Ukraine	0–0 (a.e.t.)	Brazil
	Report
Penalties
	(9–8p)

National Sports Centre Papendal

== Statistics ==
=== Goalscorers ===
13 goals

- (Iran) Abdolreza Karimizadeh

8 goals

- (Brazil) Renato Lima
- (Brazil) Wanderson Silva de Oliveira
- (Russia) Ivan Pothekin

7 goals

- (Iran) Bahman Ansari

5 goals

- (Ukraine) Anatolii Shevchyk
- (Canada) Sefik Smajlovic
- (Netherlands) John Swinkels

4 goals

- (Russia) Alexey Chesmin
- (Russia) Taras Dutko
- (Republic of Ireland) Luke Evans
- (Russia) Stanislav Kloykhalov
- (Brazil) Antonio Rocha

3 goals

- (United States) Adam Ballou
- (Iran) Ehsan Gholamhossein-pour Bousheri
- (Brazil) Claudemar Lima
- (Republic of Ireland) Finbar O’Riordan
- (Netherlands) Dennis Straatman
- (Ukraine) Andriy Tsukanov

2 goals

- (Iran) Moslem Akbari
- (Ukraine) Volodymyr Antonyuk
- (Russia) Pavel Borisov
- (Russia) Mamuka Dzimistarishvili
- (Brazil) Jose Guimaraes
- (Canada) Dustin Hodgson
- (Republic of Ireland) Mark Jones
- (Russia) Viacheslav Larionov
- (Netherlands) Stephan Lokhoff
- (Republic of Ireland) Gary Messett
- (Russia) Georgy Nadzharyan
- (Scotland) Graeme Paterson
- (Scotland) Jonathan Paterson
- (Ukraine) Denys Ponomaryov
- (Canada) Vito Proietti
- (United States) Marthell Vazquez

1 goal

- (Australia) Daniel Berry
- (Brazil) Mateus Calvo
- (Republic of Ireland) Paul Dollard
- (Scotland) Keith Gardner
- (Australia) Thomas Goodman
- (Iran) Morteza Heidari
- (Canada) James Jordon
- (Republic of Ireland) Darren Kavanagh
- (Australia) Sam Larkings
- (Australia) Jamie Laybutt
- (Australia) Jarrod Law
- (Brazil) Leandro Marinho
- (Scotland) Laurie McGinley
- (Canada) Zack Murdock
- (Iran) Gholamreza Najafi
- (Australia) Jamie Paulsen
- (Brazil) Jean Rodrigues
- (Iran) Hadi Safari
- (Brazil) Pedro Santos Jr.
- (Brazil) Jean Silva
- (Ukraine) Ivan Shkvarlo
- (Scotland) Jamie Tervit
- (Russia) Aleksey Tumakov
- (Netherlands) Patrick van Kempen
- (Netherlands) Martijn van de Ven
- (Canada) Scott van den Boogaard

own goals

- (Russia) Alexey Chesmin
- (Iran) Gholamreza Najafi
- (Scotland) Graeme Paterson
- (Scotland) Jonathan Paterson
- (Brazil) Jean Rodriques
- (Scotland) Scott Troup

=== Ranking ===
Rank	Team
Gold medal	Ukraine
Silver medal	Russia
Bronze medal	Iran
4.	Brazil
5.	(Republic of Ireland) Ireland
6.	Netherlands
7.	Scotland
8.	Australia
9.	Canada
10.	United States
11.	Japan
--	Netherlands O19
