= 2006 CPISRA Football 7-a-side European Championships =

Tournament details
- Host country: (Republic of Ireland) Ireland
- Dates: 21 – 28 July 2006
- Teams: 8
- Venue: 1 (in 1 host city)

Final positions
- Champions: Ukraine (3rd title)
- Runners-up: Russia
- Third place: Netherlands
- Fourth place: (Republic of Ireland) Ireland

Tournament statistics
- Matches played: 20
- Goals scored: 108 (5.4 per match)
- Top scorer: (Ukraine) Taras Dutko (6)

The 2006 CPISRA Football 7-a-side European Championships was the European championship for men's national 7-a-side association football teams. CPISRA stands for Cerebral Palsy International Sports & Recreation Association. Athletes with a physical disability competed. The Championship took place in Ireland from 21 to 28 July 2006.

Football 7-a-side was played with modified FIFA rules. Among the modifications were that there were seven players, no offside, a smaller playing field, and permission for one-handed throw-ins. Matches consisted of two thirty-minute halves, with a fifteen-minute half-time break. The Championships was a qualifying event for the 2007 CPISRA Football 7-a-side World Championships.

== Participating teams and officials ==
=== Teams ===
Means of qualification	Berths	Qualified
Host nation	1	(Republic of Ireland) Ireland
European Region	7	England & Wales; Finland; Netherlands; Russia; Scotland; Spain; Ukraine
Total	8	

=== The draw ===
During the draw, the teams were divided into pots because of rankings. Here, the following groups:

	Group 1	Group 2
Pot 1	Ukraine	Russia
Pot 2	(Republic of Ireland) Ireland	Netherlands
Pot 3	Spain	England & Wales
Pot 4	Scotland	Finland

=== Squads ===
The individual teams contact following football gamblers on to:

Group 1

Ukraine	(Republic of Ireland) Ireland	Spain	Scotland
1. Kostyantyn Symashko; 2. Vitaliy Trushev; 3. Sergiy Babiy; 4. Taras Dutko; 5. Oleksandr Devlysh; 6. Ivan Shkvarlo; 7. Andriy Tsukanov; 8. Denys Ponomaryov; 9. Olexiy Hetun; 10. Volodymyr Kabanov; 11. Volodymyr Antonyuk; 15. Ihor Kosenko	1. Peter O'Neill; 2. Paul Dollard; 3. Aidan Brennan; 4. Luke Evans; 5. Joseph Markey; 6. Finbar O'Riordan; 7. Gary Messett; 8. Kieran Devlin; 9. Alan O'Hara; 10. Darren Kavanagh; 11. Neil Walsh; 12. Jonathan Corway	1. Jesus Maria Visitacion; 2. Sergio Alvarez; 4. Ramon Dell Pino; 5. Jamie Rosado; 6. Juan Antonio Perez; 7. Sergio Clemente; 8. Carlos Lopez; 9. Yordi Lopez; 10. Ivan Vazquez; 11. Pedro Rocha; 12. Luis Sierra	1. Craig Connell; 2. Gary Brown; 3. Joe Divine; 4. Cameron Muir; 5. Craig Gray; 6. Keith Gardiner; 7. Martin Keirn; 9. John Wardrope; 10. Barry Manson; 11. Jonathon Patterson; 12. Barry Jackson; 15. Graeme Patterson

Group 2

Russia	Netherlands	England & Wales	Finland
1. Oleg Smirnov; 2. Andrei Lozhecnikov; 3. Anton Kalachev; 4. Rolan Dzhanaev; 5. Pavel Sizov; 6. Aleksey Tumakov; 7. Alexey Chesmin; 8. Ivan Potekhin; 11. Stanislav Kolykhalov; 12. Georgy Nadzharyan; 14. Pavel Borisov; 15. Andrey Kuvaev	1. Rudi Van Breemen; 2. Jeroen Voogd; 3. John Swinkles; 4. Jeffrey Bruinier; 5. John Dost; 6. Patrick Beekmans; 7. Richard Van Amerongen; 8. Ruben Dehass; 9. David Tetelepta; 10. Stephan Lokhoff; 11. Matijn Van De Ven; 16. Bart Adelaars	1. Gavin Wood; 2. David Kelly; 3. Stepan Hanhan; 4. Andy Taylor; 5. Dominic Benn; 6. Gary Davies; 7. Michael Barker; 8. Jordan Smith; 9. Richard Fox; 10. Michael Heathcote; 11. Mark Brookes; 12. Jordan Raynes	1. Kim Suurivouri; 2. Henri Forss; 3. Jussi Laurila; 4. Janne Inkila; 7. Teemu Komulainen; 9. Janne Helander; 10. Johannes Siikonen; 11. Antti Turunen; 12. Jaakki Seppala; 17. Jussi Tuominen; 18. Pentti Kokko

== Venues ==
The venues to be used for the European Championships were located in Dublin.

Dublin	2006 CPISRA Football 7-a-side European Championships is located in Ireland
Belfield Bowl	2006 CPISRA Football 7-a-side European Championships is located in Ireland
Capacity: 3,000	2006 CPISRA Football 7-a-side European Championships is located in Ireland

== Format ==
The first round, or group stage, was a competition between the 8 teams divided among two groups of four, where each group engaged in a round-robin tournament within itself. The two highest ranked teams in each group advanced to the knockout stage for the position one to four. The next two teams played for the position five to eight. The last teams played for the position nine to ten. Teams were awarded three points for a win and one for a draw. When comparing teams in a group over-all result came before head-to-head.

Tie-breaking criteria for group play
The ranking of teams in each group was based on the following criteria:
1. Number of points
2. Goal difference
3. Number of goals scored
4. Number of points obtained in matches between tied teams
5. Goal difference in matches between tied teams
6. Number of goals scored in matches between tied teams
7. Drawing of lots

In the knockout stage there were two rounds (semi-finals, and the final). The winners plays for the higher positions, the losers for the lower positions. For any match in the knockout stage, a draw after 60 minutes of regulation time was followed by two 10 minute periods of extra time to determine a winner. If the teams were still tied, a penalty shoot-out was held to determine a winner.

Classification
Athletes with a physical disability competed. The athlete's disability was caused by a non-progressive brain damage that affects motor control, such as cerebral palsy, traumatic brain injury or stroke. Athletes must be ambulant.

Players were classified by level of disability.

- C5: Athletes with difficulties when walking and running, but not in standing or when kicking the ball.
- C6: Athletes with control and co-ordination problems of their upper limbs, especially when running.
- C7: Athletes with hemiplegia.
- C8: Athletes with minimal disability; must meet eligibility criteria and have an impairment that has impact on the sport of football.

Teams must field at least one class C5 or C6 player at all times. No more than two players of class C8 are permitted to play at the same time.

== Group stage ==
The first round, or group stage, have seen the ten teams divided into two groups of five teams.

=== Group 1 ===
Pos	Team	Pld	W	D	L	GF	GA	GD	Pts	Qualified for
1	Ukraine	3	3	0	0	16	0	+16	9	Team play for the position 1 - 4
2	(Republic of Ireland) Ireland	3	2	0	1	14	4	+10	6	Team play for the position 1 - 4
3	Spain	3	1	0	2	9	11	−2	3	Team play for the position 5 - 8
4	Scotland	3	0	0	3	1	25	−24	0	Team play for the position 5 - 8

Source: FAIreland Football for all programme CP-ISRA European Football 7-A-Side Championships – Dublin 2006
Rules for classification: Tie-breaking criteria
21 July 2006
11:00

Scotland	1–8	Spain
Manson	Report	Vazquez 4', 27'; Y. Lopez 28', 33'; Rocha 30'; C. Lopez 48'; Clemente 53'; Dell Pino 55'

Belfield Bowl
21 July 2006
17:00

Ukraine	3–0	(Republic of Ireland) Ireland
Trushev; Dutko; Tsukanov	Report

Belfield Bowl
23 July 2006
15:00

Ukraine	6–0	Spain
Kabanov 6', 21'; Dutko 13', 32', 54'; Antonyuk 57'	Report

Belfield Bowl
23 July 2006
17:00

(Republic of Ireland) Ireland	10–0	Scotland
Dollard 4'; O'Riordan 9', 37', 46'; Messett 10', 12', 20', 31'; Markey 30'; Kavanagh 52'	Report

Belfield Bowl
24 July 2006
11:00

Ukraine	7–0	Scotland
Trushev 2', 8'; Kosenko 10'; Babiy 32'; Tsukanov 7', 27'; Devlysh 56'	Report

Belfield Bowl
24 July 2014
17:00

(Republic of Ireland) Ireland	4–1	Spain
Markey 24'; Evans 36'; O'Riordan 53'; Walsh 60'	Report	Vazquez 27'

Belfield Bowl

=== Group 2 ===
Pos	Team	Pld	W	D	L	GF	GA	GD	Pts	Qualified for
1	Russia	3	3	0	0	12	0	+12	9	Team play for the position 1 - 4
2	Netherlands	3	2	0	1	12	4	+8	6	Team play for the position 1 - 4
3	England & Wales	3	1	0	2	2	8	−6	3	Team play for the position 5 - 8
4	Finland	3	0	0	3	0	14	−14	0	Team play for the position 5 - 8

Source: FAIreland Football for all programme CP-ISRA European Football 7-A-Side Championships – Dublin 2006
Rules for classification: Tie-breaking criteria
21 July 2006
13:00

England & Wales	2–0	Finland
Goal	Report

Belfield Bowl
21 July 2006
15:00

Russia	4–0	Netherlands
Borisov 6', 48'; Lozhecnikov 7'; Potekhin 34'	Report

Belfield Bowl
23 July 2016
11:00

Netherlands	8–0	Finland
Swinkles 1'; Lokhoff 4', 5', 14', 15'; Tetelepta 23'; Van de Ven 27'; Bruinier 47'	Report

Belfield Bowl
23 July 2006
13:00

Russia	4–0	England & Wales
Chesmin 23', 44'; Kuvaev 61'; Borisov 62'	Report

Belfield Bowl
24 July 2006
13:00

Netherlands	4–0	England & Wales
Swinkles 16'; Van de Ven 39'; Lokhoff 59'; Dehass 60'	Report

Belfield Bowl
24 July 2006
15:00

Russia	4–0	Finland
Sizov 1', 3'; Lozhecnikov 20'; Dzhanaev 23'	Report

Belfield Bowl

== Knockout stage ==
=== Semi-finals ===
Position 5-8

26 July 2006
11:00

Scotland	1–6	England & Wales
J. Patterson 48'	Report	Barker 2', 24', 44'; Taylor 9'; Benn 37'; Fox 39'

Belfield Bowl

26 July 2006
13:00

Spain	3–1	Finland
Clemente 18'; Alvarez 22'; Y. Lopez 32'	Report	Laurila 59'

Belfield Bowl

Position 1-4

26 July 2006
15:00

Russia	5–1	(Republic of Ireland) Ireland
Chesmin 27'; Kuvaev 26'; Sizov 29'; Potekhin 4', 49'	Report	Dollard 43'

Belfield Bowl

26 July 2006
17:00

Ukraine	5–0	Netherlands
Trushev 53', 59'; Devlysh 15'; Antonyuk 56'; Dutko 58'	Report

Belfield Bowl

== Finals ==
Position 7-8

28 July 2006
11:00

Scotland	1–0	Finland
J. Patterson 49'	Report

Belfield Bowl

Position 5-6

28 July 2006
13:00

England & Wales	3–2	Spain
Fox 16'; Barker 50'; Davies 59'	Report	Clemente 30'; Vazquez 33'

Belfield Bowl

Position 3-4

28 July 2006
15:00

(Republic of Ireland) Ireland	1–2	Netherlands
Dollard 37'	Report	Van Amerongen 25'; Van de Ven 59'

Belfield Bowl

Final

28 July 2006
17:00

Russia	2–5	Ukraine
Kuvaev 22'; Borisov 37'	Report	Kabanov 10', 33'; Antonyuk 16'; Shkvarlo 47'; Dutko 58'

Belfield Bowl

== Statistics ==
=== Goalscorers ===
6 goals

- (Ukraine) Taras Dutko

5 goals

- (Ukraine) Vitaliy Trushev
- (Netherlands) Stephan Lokhoff

4 goals

- (England) Michael Barker
- (Russia) Pavel Borisov
- (Ukraine) Volodymyr Kabanov
- (Republic of Ireland) Gary Messett
- (Republic of Ireland) Finbar O'Riordan
- (Spain) Ivan Vazquez

3 goals

- (Ukraine) Volodymyr Antonyuk
- (Russia) Alexey Chesmin
- (Spain) Sergio Clemente
- (Republic of Ireland) Paul Dollard
- (Russia) Andrey Kuvaev
- (Russia) Ivan Potekhin
- (Russia) Pavel Sizov
- (Ukraine) Andriy Tsukanov
- (Netherlands) Matijn Van De Ven
- (Spain) Yordi Lopez

2 goals

- (England) & (Wales) Richard Fox
- (Ukraine) Oleksandr Devlysh
- (Russia) Andrei Lozhecnikov
- (Republic of Ireland) Joseph Markey
- (Netherlands) John Swinkles

1 goal

- (Spain) Sergio Alvarez
- (England) & (Wales) Dominic Benn
- (Netherlands) Jeffrey Bruinier
- (Spain) Carlos Lopez
- (England) & (Wales) Gary Davies
- (Netherlands) Ruben Dehass
- (Spain) Ramon Dell Pino
- (Russia) Rolan Dzhanaev
- (Republic of Ireland) Luke Evans
- (Republic of Ireland) Darren Kavanagh
- (Finland) Jussi Laurila
- (Scotland) Barry Manson
- (Spain) Pedro Rocha
- (Ukraine) Sergiy Babiy
- (Ukraine) Ihor Kosenko
- (Ukraine) Ivan Shkvarlo
- (England) & (Wales) Andy Taylor
- (Netherlands) David Tetelepta
- (Netherlands) Richard Van Amerongen
- (Republic of Ireland) Neil Walsh
- (England) ??
- (Spain) ??
- (Spain) ??

=== Ranking ===
Rank	Team
Gold medal	Ukraine
Silver medal	Russia
Bronze medal	Netherlands
4.	(Republic of Ireland) Ireland
5.	England & Wales
6.	Spain
7.	Scotland
8.	Finland
