= Russia at the 2008 Summer Paralympics =

- IPC code: RUS
- NPC: Russian Paralympic Committee
- Website: www.paralymp.ru (in Russian)

in Beijing
- Competitors: 144 in 13 sports
- Flag bearer: Alexey Ashapatov
- Medals Ranked 8th: Gold 18 Silver 23 Bronze 22 Total 63

Summer Paralympics appearances (overview)
- 1996; 2000; 2004; 2008; 2012; 2016–2024

Other related appearances
- Soviet Union (1988); Unified Team (1992); RPC (2020)

Russia sent a delegation to compete at the 2008 Summer Paralympics in Beijing, China that won a total of 63 medals: 18 gold, 23 silver and 22 bronze.

== Medallists ==
Medal	Name	Sport	Event
Gold	Artem Arefyev	Athletics	Men's 800m T36
Gold	Alexey Ashapatov	Athletics	Men's discus throw F57-58
Gold	Alexey Ashapatov	Athletics	Men's shot put F57-58
Gold	Oleg Kretsul	Judo	Men's 90kg
Gold	Valeriy Ponomarenko	Shooting	Men's 10m air pistol SH1
Gold	Andrey Lebedinskiy	Shooting	Mixed 25m pistol SH1
Gold	Dmitrii Kokarev	Swimming	Men's 100m freestyle S2
Gold	Dmitrii Kokarev	Swimming	Men's 200m freestyle S2
Gold	Dmitrii Kokarev	Swimming	Men's 50m backstroke S2
Gold	Igor Plotnikov	Swimming	Men's 100m backstroke S6
Gold	Konstantin Lisenkov	Swimming	Men's 100m backstroke S8
Gold	Alexander Nevolin-Svetov	Swimming	Men's 100m backstroke S12
Gold	Alexey Fomenkov	Swimming	Men's 100m breaststroke SB6
Gold	Oxana Savchenko	Swimming	Women's 50m freestyle S12
Gold	Oxana Savchenko	Swimming	Women's 100m freestyle S12
Gold	Olesya Vladykina	Swimming	Women's 100m breaststroke SB8
Gold	Oxana Savchenko	Swimming	Women's 200m individual medley SM12
Gold	Natalia Martyasheva	Table tennis	Women's singles class 6-7
Silver	Alexy Labzin	Athletics	Men's 100m T13
Silver	Alexy Labzin	Athletics	Men's 200m T13
Silver	Artem Arefyev	Athletics	Men's 400m T36
Silver	Evengy Gudkov	Athletics	Men's javelin throw F42/44
Silver	Vladimir Andryushchenko	Athletics	Men's shot put F11-12
Silver	Maxim Narozhnyy	Athletics	Men's shot put F42
Silver	Elena Chistilina	Athletics	Women's 100m T46
Silver	Pavel Borisov; Alexey Chesmin; Mamuka Dzimistaishvili; Stanislav Kolyhalov; Andrey Kuvaev; Alexander Lekov; Andrey Lozhechnikov; Lasha Murvandze; Georgy Nadzharyan; Ivan Potekhin; Oleg Smirnov; Aleksey Tumakov	Football 7-a-side	Men's team
Silver	Ayrat Zakiev	Powerlifting	Men's 60kg
Silver	Olesya Lafina	Powerlifting	Women's 48kg
Silver	Tamara Podpalnaya	Powerlifting	Women's 52kg
Silver	Irina Kazantseva	Powerlifting	Women's 56kg
Silver	Sergey Malyshev	Shooting	Men's 10m air pistol SH1
Silver	Dmitrii Kokarev	Swimming	Men's 50m freestyle S2
Silver	Alexander Nevolin-Svetov	Swimming	Men's 50m freestyle S12
Silver	Konstantin Lisenkov	Swimming	Men's 100m freestyle S8
Silver	Alexander Nevolin-Svetov	Swimming	Men's 200m individual medley SM12
Silver	Irina Grazhdanova	Swimming	Women's 50m freestyle S9
Silver	Anna Efimenko	Swimming	Women's 50m freestyle S12
Silver	Anna Efimenko	Swimming	Women's 100m freestyle S12
Silver	Anna Efimenko	Swimming	Women's 400m freestyle S13
Silver	Anastasia Diodorova	Swimming	Women's 50m butterfly S6
Silver	Yulia Ovsyannikova	Table tennis	Women's singles class 6-7
Bronze	Pavel Kharagezov	Athletics	Men's 800m T36
Bronze	Ildar Pomykalov	Athletics	Men's marathon T12
Bronze	Margarita Koptilova	Athletics	Women's 100m T38
Bronze	Margarita Koptilova	Athletics	Women's 200m T38
Bronze	Elenna Pautova	Athletics	Women's 800m T12-13
Bronze	Elenna Pautova	Athletics	Women's 1500m T13
Bronze	Victoria Potapova	Judo	Women's 48kg
Bronze	Alesya Stepanyuk	Judo	Women's 52kg
Bronze	Madina Kazakova	Judo	Women's 63kg
Bronze	Tatiana Savostyanova	Judo	Women's 70kg
Bronze	Irina Kalyanova	Judo	Women's +70kg
Bronze	Natalia Dalekova	Shooting	Women's 10m air pistol SH1
Bronze	Valeriy Ponomarenko	Shooting	Mixed 25m pistol SH1
Bronze	Valeriy Ponomarenko	Shooting	Mixed 50m pistol SH1
Bronze	Konstantin Lisenkov	Swimming	Men's 50m freestyle S8
Bronze	Alexander Chekurov	Swimming	Men's 50m freestyle S11
Bronze	Andrey Strokin	Swimming	Men's 50m freestyle S13
Bronze	Alexander Nevolin-Svetov	Swimming	Men's 100m freestyle S12
Bronze	Denis Dorogaev	Swimming	Men's 100m breaststroke SB9
Bronze	Andrey Strokin	Swimming	Men's 100m butterfly S13
Bronze	Anna Efimenko	Swimming	Women's 100m backstroke S13
Bronze	Alexander Baychik; Tanatkan Bukin; Dimitriy Gordiyenko; Evgeny Kuzovnikov; Andreu Lavrinovich; Viktor Milenin; Sergey Pozdeev; Maksim Timchenko; Sergey Uporov; Alexey Volkov; Sergey Yakunin	Volleyball	Men's team

== Sports ==
=== Archery ===
==== Men ====
Athlete	Event	Ranking round		Round of 32	Round of 16	Quarterfinals	Semifinals	Finals	
Athlete	Event	Score	Seed	Opposition score	Opposition score	Opposition score	Opposition score	Opposition score	Rank
Timur Tuchinov	Men's individual recurve	606	8	Bye	Zarzuela (ESP); L 97-98	did not advance			

=== Athletics ===
==== Men's track ====
Athlete	Class	Event	Heats		Semifinal		Final	
Athlete	Class	Event	Result	Rank	Result	Rank	Result	Rank
Artem Arefyev	T36	400m	—N/a				55.59	2nd place, silver medalist(s)
Artem Arefyev	T36	800m	—N/a				2:08.83 WR	1st place, gold medalist(s)
Vladislav Barinov	T37	100m	12.57	9	did not advance			
Vladislav Barinov	T37	200m	25.58	11	did not advance			
Pavel Kharagezov	T36	400m	—N/a				57.51	4
Pavel Kharagezov	T36	800m	—N/a				2:14.80	3rd place, bronze medalist(s)
Andrey Kholostyakov	T37	100m	12.46	5 Q	—N/a		12.49	5
Andrey Kholostyakov	T37	200m	25.41	7 q	—N/a		25.70	7
Maxim Kirillov	T12	800m	2:35.10	12	did not advance			
Andrey Koptev	T11	100m	DSQ		did not advance			
Alexey Labzin	T13	100m	10.98 =PR	2 Q	—N/a		10.88	2nd place, silver medalist(s)
Alexey Labzin	T13	200m	21.86	2 Q	—N/a		21.87	2nd place, silver medalist(s)
Yury Nosulenko	T46	200m	22.72	3 Q	—N/a		22.48	4
Yury Nosulenko	T46	400m	49.90	5 q	—N/a		49.66	6
Ildar Pomykalov	T12	10000m	—N/a				DNF	
Ildar Pomykalov	T12	Marathon	—N/a				2:33:27	3rd place, bronze medalist(s)
Artem Tayganov	T11	1500m	4:24.41	9	did not advance			
Fedor Trikolich	T12	100m	11.27	7 q	11.17	5 B	11.18	1
Alexander Yalchik	T46	800m	1:57.06	5 q	—N/a		1:58.04	7
Alexander Zverev	T13	400m	50.43	4 Q	—N/a		50.05	5
Evgeny Kegelev; Andrey Koptev; Alexey Labzin; Fedor Trikolich	T11-T13	4x100m relay	DNS		did not advance			

==== Men's field ====
Athlete	Class	Event	Final		
Athlete	Class	Event	Result	Points	Rank
Vladimir Andryushchenko	F11-12	Discus throw	49.49	974	4
Vladimir Andryushchenko	F11-12	Shot put	16.46	1015	2nd place, silver medalist(s)
Alexey Ashapatov	F57-58	Discus throw	57.61 WR	1079	1st place, gold medalist(s)
Alexey Ashapatov	F57-58	Shot put	16.03 WR	1072	1st place, gold medalist(s)
Vladislav Barinov	F37-38	Long jump	5.36	931	9
Evgeny Gudkov	F42/44	Javelin throw	55.50	1018	2nd place, silver medalist(s)
Alexey Ivanov	F55-56	Shot put	11.75 SB	1012	4
Evgeny Kegelev	F12	Long jump	6.02	-	11
Andrey Koptev	F11	Triple jump	12.44	-	4
Alexey Kuznetsov	F53-54	Javelin throw	26.78 SB	1015	6
Alexey Lesnykh	F37-38	Shot put	11.99	797	10
Maxim Narozhnyy	F42	Shot put	13.92	-	2nd place, silver medalist(s)
Sergey Sevostianov	F11	Triple jump	11.92	-	6

==== Women's track ====
Athlete	Class	Event	Heats		Final	
Athlete	Class	Event	Result	Rank	Result	Rank
Rima Batalova	T12	800m	2:20.59	4 q	2:20.94	4
Rima Batalova	T12	1500m	—N/a		4:44.21	4
Elena Chistilina	T46	100m	12.79	4 Q	12.65	2nd place, silver medalist(s)
Elena Chistilina	T46	200m	26.43	4 Q	26.15	5
Elena Frolova	T11	100m	13.48	9	did not advance	
Elena Frolova	T11	200m	27.59	8 q	27.69	7
Margarita Goncharova	T38	100m	14.29	3 Q	13.97	3rd place, bronze medalist(s)
Margarita Goncharova	T38	200m	28.75	4 Q	28.62	3rd place, bronze medalist(s)
Yulia Linevich	T36	100m	—N/a		16.10	8
Alexandra Moguchaya	T46	100m	13.04	9	did not advance	
Alexandra Moguchaya	T46	200m	27.32	12	did not advance	
Elena Pautova	T12	800m	2:17.27	2 q	2:15.70	3rd place, bronze medalist(s)
Elena Pautova	T12	1500m	—N/a		4:32.91	3rd place, bronze medalist(s)
Nikol Rodomakina	T46	100m	12.79	4 Q	12.76	5
Nikol Rodomakina	T46	200m	26.40	3 Q	26.52	7
Agyul Sakhibzadaeva	T36	100m	—N/a		15.74	7
Agyul Sakhibzadaeva	T36	200m	—N/a		33.91	7
Olga Semenova	T13	200m	DNS		did not advance	
Olga Semenova	T13	400m	1:04.90	9	did not advance	
Svetlana Sergeeva	T37	100m	14.87	7 q	15.24	8
Evgenia Trushnikova	T37	100m	15.35	11	did not advance	
Evgenia Trushnikova	T37	200m	31.51	8 q	31.06	5

==== Women's field ====
Athlete	Class	Event	Final		
Athlete	Class	Event	Result	Points	Rank
Yulia Arefyeva	F35-38	Javelin throw	18.83 SB	1085	5
Elena Burdykina	F32-34/52-53	Shot put	7.05	935	8
Natalia Gudkova	F42-46	Javelin throw	38.16 SB	1042	5
Svetlana Sergeeva	F35-38	Javelin throw	24.60 SB	1036	8
Svetlana Sergeeva	F37-38	Shot put	8.57	849	16
Olga Sergienko	F57-58	Javelin throw	20.55 SB	1032	4
Olga Sergienko	F57-58	Shot put	8.46	842	11
Aleksandra Surkova	F13	Long jump	4.64	-	10

=== Equestrian ===
Athlete	Horse	Event	Total	
Athlete	Horse	Event	Score	Rank
Mariya Zagorskaya	Bazalt	Mixed individual championship test grade Ia	47.000	13
Mariya Zagorskaya	Bazalt	Mixed individual freestyle test grade Ia	60.833	10

=== Football 7-a-side ===
The men's football 7-a-side team won the silver medal after losing to Ukraine in the gold medal match.

==== Players ====
- Pavel Borisov
- Alexey Chesmin
- Mamuka Dzimistarishvili
- Stanislav Kolykhalov
- Andrey Kuvaev
- Alexander Lekov
- Andrey Lozhechnikov
- Lasha Murvandze
- Georgy Nadzharyan
- Ivan Potekhin
- Oleg Smirnov
- Aleksey Tumakov

==== Tournament ====
8 September 2008
9:00

Russia	6 - 0	China

Olympic Green Hockey Field
10 September 2008
13:30

Netherlands	1 - 12	Russia

Olympic Green Hockey Field
12 September 2008
9:00

Russia	3 – 0	Brazil

Olympic Green Hockey Field

Semifinals

14 September 2008
16:30

Iran	0 - 5	Russia

Olympic Green Hockey Field

Gold medal match

16 September 2008
16:30

Russia	1 - 2 (a.e.t)	Ukraine

Olympic Green Hockey Field
Attendance: 11267
Referee: Guido Gonzalez (Colombia)

=== Judo ===
==== Men ====
Athlete	Event	First Round	Quarterfinals	Semifinals	Repechage round 1	Repechage round 2	Final/ Bronze medal contest
Athlete	Event	Opposition Result	Opposition Result	Opposition Result	Opposition Result	Opposition Result	Opposition Result
Oleg Kretsul	Men's 90kg	Vazquez (ESP); W 1100-0000	Clarke (AUS); W 1000-0000	Nine (ALG); W 1000-0000	—N/a		Mammadov (AZE); W 0100-0010 (gold)
Alexander Parasyuk	Men's +100kg	Papp (HUN); L 0000-1011	—N/a		Papachristos (GRE); W 0001-0000	Dewall (USA); L 0000-1000	Did not advance
Said Shakhmanov	Men's 60kg	—N/a	Ibrahimov (AZE); L 0000–1000	—N/a	Zasyadkovych (UKR); W 0010-0001	Hirose (JPN); W 1000-0101	Li X (CHN); L 0000-1000
Anatoliy Shevchenko	Men's 90kg	Nine (ALG); L 0001-0010	—N/a		Watson (USA); W 1000-0000	Vazquez (ESP); W 0001-0000	Cugnon de Sevricourt (FRA); L 0001-0002

==== Women ====
Athlete	Event	First Round	Quarterfinals	Semifinals	Repechage	Final/ Bronze medal contest
Athlete	Event	Opposition Result	Opposition Result	Opposition Result	Opposition Result	Opposition Result
Ekaterina Buzmakova	Women's 57kg	Wang L (CHN); L 0000-1000	—N/a		D Silva (BRA); L 0000-1000	Did not advance
Irina Kalyanova	Women's +70kg	Yuan Y (CHN); L 0000-1000	—N/a		Bye	Komatsu (JPN); W 0201-0000 (bronze)
Madina Kazakova	Women's 63kg	Bye	Aimthisung (THA); W 1000-0000	Arce (ESP); L 0002-0011	—N/a	Zhou Q (CHN); W 1010-0010 (bronze)
Victoria Potapova	Women's 48kg	Bye	Brussig (GER); W 1000–0020	Guo H (CHN); L 0001-0110	—N/a	Halinska (UKR); W 0201-0010 (bronze)
Tatiana Savostyanova	Women's 70kg	Bye		Ruvalcaba (MEX); L 0101-0110	—N/a	Szabo (HUN); W 1000-0000 (bronze)
Alesya Stepanyuk	Women's 52kg	S Hernandez (ESP); W 1000-0000	—N/a	Aurieres-Martinet (FRA); L 0000-1000	—N/a	Tsuchiya (JPN); W 0200-0000 (bronze)

=== Powerlifting ===
==== Men ====
Athlete	Event	Result	Rank
Ildar Bedderdinov	52kg	157.5	5
Nikolay Marfin	+100kg	207.5	6
Vadim Rakitin	82.5kg	200.0	5
Sergey Sychev	67.5kg	190.0	4
Ayrat Zakiev	60kg	200.0	2nd place, silver medalist(s)

==== Women ====
Athlete	Event	Result	Rank
Irina Kazantseva	56kg	97.5	2nd place, silver medalist(s)
Olga Kiseleva	75kg	100.0	5
Olesya Lafina	48kg	115.0	2nd place, silver medalist(s)
Tamara Podpalnaya	52kg	125.0	2nd place, silver medalist(s)

=== Rowing ===
Athlete	Event	Heats		Repechage		Final	
Athlete	Event	Time	Rank	Time	Rank	Time	Rank
Elena Akimova; Valery Bisarnov; Nikolay Bogomolov; Anatoly Krupin; Valentina Pshenichnaya	Mixed coxed four	3:51.78	10 R	3:53.51	6 FB	3:52.20	3

=== Shooting ===
==== Men ====
Athlete	Event	Qualification		Final		
Athlete	Event	Score	Rank	Score	Total	Rank
Andrey Lebedinskiy	Men's 10m air pistol SH1	564	7 Q	99.7	663.7	4
Andrey Lebedinskiy	Mixed 25m pistol SH1	574	1 Q	200.7	774.7	1st place, gold medalist(s)
Andrey Lebedinskiy	Mixed 50m pistol SH1	518	14	did not advance		
Sergey Malyshev	Men's 10m air pistol SH1	569	2 Q	96.8	664.6	2nd place, silver medalist(s)
Sergey Malyshev	Mixed 25m pistol SH1	569	6 Q	193.9	762.9	6
Sergey Malyshev	Mixed 50m pistol SH1	532	8 Q	91.8	623.8	5
Sergey Nochevnoy	Mixed 10m air rifle prone SH1	599	7 Q	104.0	703.0	7
Sergey Nochevnoy	Mixed 50m rifle prone SH1	587	4 Q	100.8	687.8	6
Valeriy Ponomarenko	Men's 10m air pistol SH1	578	1 Q	94.4	672.4	1st place, gold medalist(s)
Valeriy Ponomarenko	Mixed 25m pistol SH1	573	2 Q	195.9	768.9	3rd place, bronze medalist(s)
Valeriy Ponomarenko	Mixed 50m pistol SH1	542	2 Q	85.8	627.8	3rd place, bronze medalist(s)

==== Women ====
Athlete	Event	Qualification		Final		
Athlete	Event	Score	Rank	Score	Total	Rank
Natalia Dalekova	Women's 10m air pistol SH1	366	5 Q	96.6	462.6	3rd place, bronze medalist(s)
Anastasia Panteleeva	Women's 10m air pistol SH1	369	3 Q	93.5	462.5	4

=== Swimming ===
==== Men ====
Athlete	Class	Event	Heats		Final	
Athlete	Class	Event	Result	Rank	Result	Rank
Albert Bakaev	S3	50m backstroke	1:00.24	7 Q	58.31	6
Albert Bakaev	S3	50m freestyle	58.64	7 Q	1:03.95	8
Albert Bakaev	S3	100m freestyle	2:07.34	6 Q	2:11.01	8
Mikhail Boyarin	S8	50m freestyle	30.42	13	did not advance	
Mikhail Boyarin	S8	100m freestyle	1:05.68	14	did not advance	
Alexander Chekurov	S11	100m butterfly	1:21.51	12	did not advance	
Alexander Chekurov	S11	50m freestyle	27.51	4 Q	27.26	3rd place, bronze medalist(s)
Alexander Chekurov	S11	100m freestyle	1:04.02	8 Q	1:03.41	7
Denis Dorogaev	SB9	100m breaststroke	1:11.28	3 Q	1:10.16	3rd place, bronze medalist(s)
Igor Erokhin	SB7	100m breaststroke	1:33.22	11	did not advance	
Igor Erokhin	SM8	200m individual medley	2:50.88	12	did not advance	
Alexey Fomenkov	S8	100m backstroke	1:13.06	4 Q	1:12.33	4
Alexey Fomenkov	SB6	100m breaststroke	1:34.32	3 Q	1:27.22 PR	1st place, gold medalist(s)
Konstantin Lisenkov	S8	100m backstroke	1:06.72 WR	1 Q	1:06.33 WR	1st place, gold medalist(s)
Konstantin Lisenkov	S8	100m butterfly	1:09.66	10	did not advance	
Konstantin Lisenkov	S8	50m freestyle	27.78	3 Q	27.18	3rd place, bronze medalist(s)
Konstantin Lisenkov	S8	100m freestyle	1:00.32	4 Q	59.01	2nd place, silver medalist(s)
Ivan Khmelnitskiy	S4	50m freestyle	44.21	8 Q	43.93	8
Ivan Khmelnitskiy	S4	100m freestyle	1:32.66	4 Q	1:33.37	6
Ivan Khmelnitskiy	S4	200m freestyle	3:16.67	5 Q	3:15.79	6
Dmitrii Kokarev	S2	50m backstroke	1:06.21	2 Q	1:03.17 WR	1st place, gold medalist(s)
Dmitrii Kokarev	S2	50m freestyle	1:09.59	1 Q	1:05.15	2nd place, silver medalist(s)
Dmitrii Kokarev	S2	100m freestyle	2:19.39	1 Q	2:18.04	1st place, gold medalist(s)
Dmitrii Kokarev	S2	200m freestyle	4:50.77	1 Q	4:45.43	1st place, gold medalist(s)
Alexander Nevolin-Svetov	S12	100m backstroke	1:00.78 WR	1 Q	59.37 WR	1st place, gold medalist(s)
Alexander Nevolin-Svetov	S12	50m freestyle	25.23	3 Q	24.73	2nd place, silver medalist(s)
Alexander Nevolin-Svetov	S12	100m freestyle	55.00	3 Q	54.58	3rd place, bronze medalist(s)
Alexander Nevolin-Svetov	SM12	200m individual medley	2:17.94	2 Q	2:13.86	2nd place, silver medalist(s)
Rustam Nurmukhametov	S11	50m freestyle	29.44	16	did not advance	
Rustam Nurmukhametov	S11	100m freestyle	1:05.51	12	did not advance	
Rustam Nurmukhametov	SB11	100m breaststroke	1:22.74	9	did not advance	
Alexander Pikalov	S12	100m butterfly	1:04.47	9	did not advance	
Alexander Pikalov	S12	50m freestyle	26.27	8 Q	25.92	7
Alexander Pikalov	S12	100m freestyle	58.18	9	did not advance	
Igor Plotnikov	S6	100m backstroke	1:15.58	1 Q	1:14.45	1st place, gold medalist(s)
Igor Plotnikov	S6	50m butterfly	33.26	4 Q	33.25	6
Igor Plotnikov	S6	400m freestyle	6:24.21	11	did not advance	
Dmitry Polin	S9	50m freestyle	29.46	20	did not advance	
Dmitry Polin	SB9	100m breaststroke	1:12.47	5 Q	1:11.74	5
Ruslan Sadvakasov	S7	50m butterfly	33.74	6 Q	34.12	7
Ruslan Sadvakasov	SB7	100m breaststroke	1:32.89	10	did not advance	
Eduard Samarin	S10	50m freestyle	26.78	14	did not advance	
Eduard Samarin	S10	100m freestyle	58.63	17	did not advance	
Eduard Samarin	S10	400m freestyle	4:27.59	8 Q	4:28.25	8
Eduard Samarin	SM10	200m individual medley	2:30.93	14	did not advance	
Alexander Shchelochkov	S10	50m freestyle	25.79	11	did not advance	
Nikita Shevchenko	S7	100m backstroke	1:24.86	11	did not advance	
Mikhail Sidnin	S8	100m butterfly	1:08.47	9	did not advance	
Kirill Sokolov	SB6	100m breaststroke	1:36.45	7 Q	1:33.77	4
Kirill Sokolov	SM7	200m individual medley SM7	3:13.84	13	did not advance	
Andrey Strokin	S13	100m butterfly	1:00.60	3 Q	1:00.83	3rd place, bronze medalist(s)
Andrey Strokin	S13	50m freestyle	24.81	3 Q	24.55	3rd place, bronze medalist(s)
Andrey Strokin	S13	100m freestyle	55.29	7 Q	55.19	7
Konstantin Tychkov	S11	100m butterfly	1:15.44	9	did not advance	
Konstantin Tychkov	S11	50m freestyle	28.47	10	did not advance	
Konstantin Tychkov	S11	100m freestyle	1:04.02	8 Q	1:02.82	7
Artem Zakharov	SB6	100m breaststroke	1:40.61	8 Q	1:39.61	8
Evgeny Zimin	S8	100m butterfly	1:13.50	14	did not advance	
Mikhail Zimin	SB13	100m breaststroke	1:11.78	7 Q	1:09.14	4
Ivan Khmelnitskiy; Dmitrii Kokarev; Artem Zakharov; Evgeny Zimin	N/A	4x50m freestyle relay	—N/a		DQ	
Mikhail Boyarin; Konstantin Lisenkov; Eduard Samarin; Mikhail Sidnin	N/A	4x100m freestyle relay	—N/a		4:10.52	8
Albert Bakaev; Alexey Fomenkov; Ivan Khmelnitskiy; Ruslan Sadvakasov	N/A	4x50m medley relay	DQ		did not advance	
Mikhail Boyarin; Denis Dorogaev; Konstantin Lisenkov; Mikhail Sidnin	N/A	4x100m medley relay	4:33.11	6 Q	4:28.51	4

==== Women ====
Athlete	Class	Event	Heats		Final	
Athlete	Class	Event	Result	Rank	Result	Rank
Anastasia Diodorova	S6	100m backstroke	1:36.20	5 Q	1:33.96	4
Anastasia Diodorova	S6	50m butterfly	40.90	4 Q	39.93	2nd place, silver medalist(s)
Anastasia Diodorova	SM6	200m individual medley	3:33.32	8 Q	3:33.24	8
Anna Efimenko	S12	50m freestyle	29.42	7 Q	27.82	2nd place, silver medalist(s)
Anna Efimenko	S12	100m freestyle	1:03.01	3 Q	1:01.24	2nd place, silver medalist(s)
Irina Grazhdanova	S9	100m butterfly	1:15.57	12	did not advance	
Irina Grazhdanova	S9	50m freestyle	29.60	2 Q	29.33	2nd place, silver medalist(s)
Irina Grazhdanova	S9	100m freestyle	1:06.78	11	did not advance	
Irina Grazhdanova	S9	400m freestyle	5:23.29	16	did not advance	
Irina Grazhdanova	SM9	200m individual medley	2:58.11	16	did not advance	
Oxana Guseva	S7	50m butterfly	42.28	8 Q	41.07	8
Oxana Guseva	S7	100m freestyle	—N/a		1:20.68	8
Oxana Guseva	S7	400m freestyle	5:50.89	6 Q	5:46.61	6
Oxana Guseva	SM7	200m individual medley	3:24.21	5 Q	3:19.50	6
Yulia Nikitina	SB9	100m breaststroke	1:27.86	8 Q	1:27.28	8
Oxana Savchenko	S12	50m freestyle	27.92 WR	1 Q	27.07 WR	1st place, gold medalist(s)
Oxana Savchenko	S12	100m freestyle	1:01.27 PR	1 Q	59.47 WR	1st place, gold medalist(s)
Oxana Savchenko	SM12	200m individual medley	2:36.12	1 Q	2:30.55	1st place, gold medalist(s)
Olga Sokolova	S11	50m freestyle	24.17	10	did not advance	
Olga Sokolova	S11	100m freestyle	1:19.17	10	did not advance	
Anna Vengerovskaya	S8	100m butterfly	1:22.58	9	did not advance	
Anna Vengerovskaya	S8	50m freestyle	35.36	10	did not advance	
Anna Vengerovskaya	S8	100m freestyle	1:20.89	15	did not advance	
Anna Vengerovskaya	SM8	200m individual medley	3:06.05	12	did not advance	
Olesya Vladykina	SB8	100m breaststroke	1:23.40 PR	1 Q	1:20.58 WR	1st place, gold medalist(s)
Olesya Vladykina	SM8	200m individual medley	2:53.72 PR	3 Q	2:53.79	4

=== Table tennis ===
==== Men ====
Athlete	Event	Preliminaries				Semifinals	Final / BM	
Athlete	Event	Opposition Result	Opposition Result	Opposition Result	Rank	Opposition Result	Opposition Result	Rank
Sergey Poddubnyy	Men's singles C2	Molliens (FRA); L 0–3	Kim K Y (KOR); W 3-2	Ahmed (LBA); W 3–0	2	did not advance		
Vadim Buzin	Men's singles C6	Rosenmeier (DEN); L 1-3	P du Plooy (RSA); W 3-0	Arguello Garcia (CRC); W 3-2	2	did not advance		
Alexander Esaulov	Men's singles C6	Arnold (GER); L 0-3	Gregorovic (CRO); W 3-1	Chen C (CHN); W 3-2	2	did not advance		
Pavel Lukyanov	Men's singles C9-10	de la Bourdonnaye (FRA); L 0-3	Manso (CUB); W 3-1	—N/a	2	did not advance		

==== Women ====
Athlete	Event	Preliminaries				Semifinals	Final / BM	
Athlete	Event	Opposition Result	Opposition Result	Opposition Result	Rank	Opposition Result	Opposition Result	Rank
Nadezda Pushpasheva	Women's singles C1-2	Pezzutto (ITA); L 1–3	Breathnach (IRL); W 3-1	—N/a	2	did not advance		
Natalia Martyasheva	Women's singles C6-7	Khodzynska (UKR); W 3-1	Barneoud (FRA); W 3-0	—N/a	1 Q	van Zon (NED); W 3-2	Ovsyannikova (RUS); W 3-1	1st place, gold medalist(s)
Yulia Ovsyannikova	Women's singles C6-7	Safonova (UKR); W 3-2	Na (KOR); W 3-0	—N/a	1 Q	Mahmoud Afify (EGY); W 3-1	Martyasheva (RUS); L 1-3	2nd place, silver medalist(s)
Olga Komleva	Women's singles 9	Liu M (CHN); L 0-3	Grzelak (POL); L 1-3	Lazzaro (AUS); W 3-0	3	did not advance		
Inna Karmayeva	Women's singles 10	Fan L (CHN); L 0-3	la Bourdonnaye (CZE); L 0-3	Maghraby (EGY); W 3-0	3	did not advance		

==== Teams ====
Athlete	Event	Round of 16	Quarterfinals	Semifinals	Final / BM	
Athlete	Event	Opposition Result	Opposition Result	Opposition Result	Opposition Result	Rank
Vadim Buzin; Alexander Esaulov	Men's team C6-8	Spain (ESP); L 1-3	did not advance			
Inna Karmayeva; Olga Komleva; Natalia Martyasheva; Yulia Ovsyannikova	Women's team C6-10	Bye	Sweden (SWE); W 3-1	Poland (POL); L 0-3	France (FRA); L 0-3	4

=== Volleyball ===
==== Men's tournament ====
The men's team won the bronze medal after defeating Egypt in the bronze medal match.

Players

- Alexander Baychik
- Tanatkan Bukin
- Dimitriy Gordiyenko
- Evgeny Kuzovnikov
- Andreu Lavrinovich
- Viktor Milenin
- Sergey Pozdeev
- Maksim Timchenko
- Sergey Uporov
- Alexey Volkov
- Sergey Yakunin

Group A matches

8 September 2008; 19:30	China (CHN)	0–3	Russia (RUS)	China Agricultural University Gymnasium; Attendance: 2,000; Referees: France Marcoux (Canada)
8 September 2008; 19:30	(22–25, 22–25, 23–25)			China Agricultural University Gymnasium; Attendance: 2,000; Referees: France Marcoux (Canada)

9 September 2008; 15:30	Russia (RUS)	3-0	Iraq (IRQ)	China Agricultural University Gymnasium; Attendance: 1,300; Referees: Joseph Campbell (United States)
9 September 2008; 15:30	(25–13, 25–8, 25–15)			China Agricultural University Gymnasium; Attendance: 1,300; Referees: Joseph Campbell (United States)

10 September 2008; 11:30	Bosnia and Herzegovina (BIH)	1–3	Russia (RUS)	China Agricultural University Gymnasium; Attendance: 400; Referees: Janko Plesnik (Slovenia)
10 September 2008; 11:30	(21–25, 22–25, 25–18, 16–25)			China Agricultural University Gymnasium; Attendance: 400; Referees: Janko Plesnik (Slovenia)

Semifinals

12 September 2008; 18:00	Russia (RUS)	0–3	Iran (IRI)	China Agricultural University Gymnasium; Attendance: 2,000; Referees: Gabor Karadi (Hungary)
12 September 2008; 18:00	(22–25, 13–25, 20–25)			China Agricultural University Gymnasium; Attendance: 2,000; Referees: Gabor Karadi (Hungary)

Bronze medal match

15 September 2008; 16:00	Russia (RUS)	3-2	Egypt (EGY)	China Agricultural University Gymnasium; Attendance: 2,400; Referees: Martijn Meulenkamp (Netherlands)
15 September 2008; 16:00	(22–25, 25–16, 19–25, 25–20, 15–9)			China Agricultural University Gymnasium; Attendance: 2,400; Referees: Martijn Meulenkamp (Netherlands)

=== Wheelchair fencing ===
==== Men ====
Athlete	Event	Qualification			Round of 16	Quarterfinal	Semifinal	Final / BM	
Athlete	Event	Opposition	Score	Rank	Opposition Score	Opposition Score	Opposition Score	Opposition Score	Rank
Ivan Andreev	Men's foil A	Pender (POL)	L 0-5	6	did not advance				
Ivan Andreev	Men's foil A	Pellegrini (ITA)	L 1-5	6	did not advance				
Ivan Andreev	Men's foil A	Maillard (FRA)	W 5-4	6	did not advance				
Ivan Andreev	Men's foil A	Mato (HUN)	L 4-5	6	did not advance				
Ivan Andreev	Men's foil A	Alhaddad (KUW)	L 2-5	6	did not advance				
Ivan Andreev	Men's sabre A	Ye R (CHN)	L 1-5	5 Q	Pellegrini (ITA); L 6-15	did not advance			
Ivan Andreev	Men's sabre A	Stanczuk (POL)	L 4-5	5 Q	Pellegrini (ITA); L 6-15	did not advance			
Ivan Andreev	Men's sabre A	Mato (HUN)	L 3-5	5 Q	Pellegrini (ITA); L 6-15	did not advance			
Ivan Andreev	Men's sabre A	Citerne (FRA)	W 5-4	5 Q	Pellegrini (ITA); L 6-15	did not advance			
Ivan Andreev	Men's sabre A	Alexakis (GRE)	W 5-4	5 Q	Pellegrini (ITA); L 6-15	did not advance			
Sergey Frolov	Men's foil A	Ye R (CHN)	L 2-5	5 Q	Ye R (CHN); L 9-15	did not advance			
Sergey Frolov	Men's foil A	Chan W K (HKG)	L 2-5	5 Q	Ye R (CHN); L 9-15	did not advance			
Sergey Frolov	Men's foil A	Bazhukov (UKR)	L 1-5	5 Q	Ye R (CHN); L 9-15	did not advance			
Sergey Frolov	Men's foil A	Makowski (POL)	L 4-5	5 Q	Ye R (CHN); L 9-15	did not advance			
Sergey Frolov	Men's foil A	Calhoun (USA)	W 5-4	5 Q	Ye R (CHN); L 9-15	did not advance			
Sergey Frolov	Men's sabre A	Pellegrini (ITA)	L 0-5	5 Q	Makowski (POL); W 15-10	Pellegrini (ITA); L 3-15	did not advance		
Sergey Frolov	Men's sabre A	More (FRA)	L 1-5	5 Q	Makowski (POL); W 15-10	Pellegrini (ITA); L 3-15	did not advance		
Sergey Frolov	Men's sabre A	Makowski (POL)	W 5-4	5 Q	Makowski (POL); W 15-10	Pellegrini (ITA); L 3-15	did not advance		
Sergey Frolov	Men's sabre A	Calhoun (USA)	L 2-5	5 Q	Makowski (POL); W 15-10	Pellegrini (ITA); L 3-15	did not advance		
Sergey Frolov	Men's sabre A	L Sanchez (ESP)	W 5-3	5 Q	Makowski (POL); W 15-10	Pellegrini (ITA); L 3-15	did not advance		
Sergey Frolov	Men's sabre A	Altabbakh (KUW)	W 5-4	5 Q	Makowski (POL); W 15-10	Pellegrini (ITA); L 3-15	did not advance		
Vladimir Poleshchuk	Men's épée B	Komar (UKR)	L 3–5	3 Q	Kim GH (KOR); L 13-15	did not advance			
Vladimir Poleshchuk	Men's épée B	Latreche (FRA)	W 5-1	3 Q	Kim GH (KOR); L 13-15	did not advance			
Vladimir Poleshchuk	Men's épée B	Bogdos (GRE)	L 2-5	3 Q	Kim GH (KOR); L 13-15	did not advance			
Vladimir Poleshchuk	Men's épée B	Williams (USA)	W 5-3	3 Q	Kim GH (KOR); L 13-15	did not advance			
Vladimir Poleshchuk	Men's épée B	Alsaedi (KUW)	W 5-1	3 Q	Kim GH (KOR); L 13-15	did not advance			
Marat Yusupov	Men's foil B	Sarri (ITA)	L 2-5	5 Q	Latreche (FRA); L 8-15	did not advance			
Marat Yusupov	Men's foil B	Latreche (FRA)	L 2-5	5 Q	Latreche (FRA); L 8-15	did not advance			
Marat Yusupov	Men's foil B	Wyganowski (POL)	L 2-5	5 Q	Latreche (FRA); L 8-15	did not advance			
Marat Yusupov	Men's foil B	Hisakawa (JPN)	W 5-2	5 Q	Latreche (FRA); L 8-15	did not advance			
Marat Yusupov	Men's foil B	Bezyazychny (BLR)	W 5-4	5 Q	Latreche (FRA); L 8-15	did not advance			
Marat Yusupov	Men's sabre B	Mari (ITA)	L 1-5	4 Q	Datsko (UKR); W 15-8	Francois (FRA); L 9-15	did not advance		
Marat Yusupov	Men's sabre B	Hui (HKG)	L 4-5	4 Q	Datsko (UKR); W 15-8	Francois (FRA); L 9-15	did not advance		
Marat Yusupov	Men's sabre B	Pluta (POL)	W 5-4	4 Q	Datsko (UKR); W 15-8	Francois (FRA); L 9-15	did not advance		
Marat Yusupov	Men's sabre B	Soler (ESP)	W 5-0	4 Q	Datsko (UKR); W 15-8	Francois (FRA); L 9-15	did not advance		
Marat Yusupov	Men's sabre B	Moreno (USA)	W 5-4	4 Q	Datsko (UKR); W 15-8	Francois (FRA); L 9-15	did not advance		

==== Women ====
Athlete	Event	Qualification			Round of 16	Quarterfinal	Semifinal	Final / BM	
Athlete	Event	Opposition	Score	Rank	Opposition Score	Opposition Score	Opposition Score	Opposition Score	Rank
Liudmila Vasilyeva	Women's épée B	Yao F (CHN)	W 5-4	1 Q	—N/a	Magnat (FRA); W 15–13	Yao F (CHN); L 10-15	Jana (THA); L 8–15	4
Liudmila Vasilyeva	Women's épée B	Magnat (FRA)	W 5-3	1 Q	—N/a	Magnat (FRA); W 15–13	Yao F (CHN); L 10-15	Jana (THA); L 8–15	4
Liudmila Vasilyeva	Women's épée B	Vettraino (ITA)	W 5-1	1 Q	—N/a	Magnat (FRA); W 15–13	Yao F (CHN); L 10-15	Jana (THA); L 8–15	4
Liudmila Vasilyeva	Women's épée B	Palfi (HUN)	W 5-3	1 Q	—N/a	Magnat (FRA); W 15–13	Yao F (CHN); L 10-15	Jana (THA); L 8–15	4
Liudmila Vasilyeva	Women's épée B	Demello (USA)	W 5-1	1 Q	—N/a	Magnat (FRA); W 15–13	Yao F (CHN); L 10-15	Jana (THA); L 8–15	4
Liudmila Vasilyeva	Women's foil B	Chan Y C (HKG)	L 1-5	5 Q	Magnat (FRA); W 15-9	Yao F (CHN); L 7-15	did not advance		
Liudmila Vasilyeva	Women's foil B	Ye H (CHN)	L 2-5	5 Q	Magnat (FRA); W 15-9	Yao F (CHN); L 7-15	did not advance		
Liudmila Vasilyeva	Women's foil B	Jana (THA)	L 1-5	5 Q	Magnat (FRA); W 15-9	Yao F (CHN); L 7-15	did not advance		
Liudmila Vasilyeva	Women's foil B	Palfi (HUN)	L 4-5	5 Q	Magnat (FRA); W 15-9	Yao F (CHN); L 7-15	did not advance		
Liudmila Vasilyeva	Women's foil B	Demello (USA)	W 5-0	5 Q	Magnat (FRA); W 15-9	Yao F (CHN); L 7-15	did not advance		

=== Wheelchair tennis ===
==== Men ====
Athlete	Class	Event	Round of 64	Round of 32	Round of 16	Quarterfinals	Semifinals	Finals
Athlete	Class	Event	Opposition Result	Opposition Result	Opposition Result	Opposition Result	Opposition Result	Opposition Result
Leonid Shevchik	Open	Men's singles	Lee H-G (KOR); L 1-6, 1-6	did not advance				

== See also ==
- Russia at the Paralympics
- Russia at the 2008 Summer Olympics
