= List of Paralympic medalists in football 7-a-side =

Football 7-a-side was taken place since the 1984 Summer Paralympics in New York/Stoke Mandeville for standing and wheelchair players but in the 1988 Summer Paralympics, it was changed to only standing competitors. Men have played in this sport but women have not yet played. Netherlands have won this sport three times while Russia has won twice, been runners-up twice and earned a bronze medal within five Paralympic games.

== Medalists ==
=== Men's wheelchair medalists ===
Event	Gold	Silver	Bronze
1984 New York/Stoke Mandeville	United States (USA)	Canada (CAN)	Great Britain (GBR)

=== Men's standing medalists ===
Event	Gold	Silver	Bronze
1984 New York/Stoke Mandeville	Belgium (BEL)	Ireland (IRL)	Great Britain (GBR)
1988 Seoul	Netherlands (NED)	Belgium (BEL)	Ireland (IRL)
1992 Barcelona	Netherlands (NED)	Portugal (POR)	Ireland (IRL)
1996 Atlanta	Netherlands (NED)	Russia (RUS)	Spain (ESP)
2000 Sydney	Russia (RUS)	Ukraine (UKR)	Brazil (BRA)
2004 Athens	Ukraine (UKR)	Brazil (BRA)	Russia (RUS)
2008 Beijing	Ukraine (UKR)	Russia (RUS)	Iran (IRI)
2012 London	Russia (RUS)	Ukraine (UKR)	Iran (IRI)

=== Multi-medalists ===
Carlo Dengerink, Jaap de Vries, Paul Heersink, Barend Verbeck, Peter Guntlisbergen, Arno de Jong were all multi-medalists by winning three gold medals for the Netherlands between 1988 and 1992.

Alan Ball, Paul Cassin, Anthony Noland, Peter Alexander, Carlos Keating were two-time bronze medallists in 1988 and 1992 for Ireland.

Between 2004 and 2008, Volodymyr Antonyuk, Ihor Kosenko, Vitaliy Trushev, Denys Ponomaryov, Andriy Tsukanov, Taras Dutko, Serhiy Vakulenko were gold medal winners twice consecutively for Ukraine.

Meanwhile, the Russian team, Andrey Lozhechnikov (1996 to 2004) has won two silver medals and a bronze. Andrey Kuveav (2004 to 2008) has earned a silver and bronze medal.

Iran have been football 7-a-side bronze medallists twice. Moslem Akbari, Bahman Ansari, Rasoul Atashafrouz, Abdolreza Karimzadeh appeared in the 2008 Summer Paralympics and 2012 Summer Paralympics.
