= Russia national cerebral palsy football team =

- Federation: Russian Cerebral Palsy Football Federation (RCPFF)
- IFCPF ranking: 2
- Highest IFCPF ranking: 1 (November 2014, August 2013)
- Lowest IFCPF ranking: 2 (July 2011, June 2016)

Russia national cerebral palsy football team is the national cerebral football team for Russia that represents the team in international competitions. The team has participated at multiple Paralympic Games, winning gold in the 2000 and 2012 editions. Russia won the IFCPF World Championships in 1998, 2007, 2011 and 2015.

== Background ==
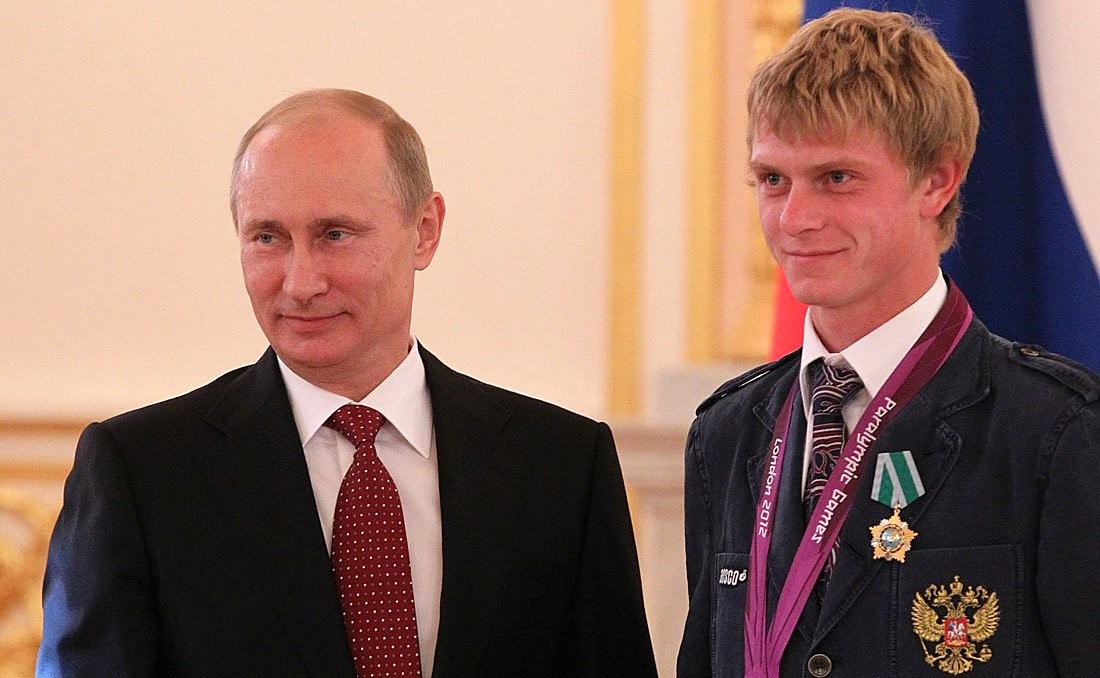
Vladimir Putin and a 2012 Russian CP football Paralympian.

Russian Cerebral Palsy Football Federation (RCPFF) manages the national team. During the 2000s, the team was one of the top four most dominant teams in the world alongside Brazil, Ukraine and Iran. In 2011 and 2012, the team was coached by Baramidze Avtandil. Russia was active internationally by 2016, and had national championships to support national team player development. National team development is supported by an International Federation of Cerebral Palsy Football (IFCPF) recognized national championship. Recognized years for the national IFCPF recognized competition include 2010, 2011, 2012, 2013, 2014, and 2015.

In 2016, after getting an endorsement by the World AntiDoping Agency (WADA), the IFCPF Anti-Doping Code was formally amended to allow for out of competition testing. This was done through a WADA approved Whereabouts Programme managed through ADAMS. Drawing from players in a Registered Testing Pool, players from this country were included ahead of the 2016 Summer Paralympics in Rio.

== Ranking ==
In 2016, Russia was ranked 2nd in the world by the IFCPF. In November 2014, the team was ranked number 1 in the world. In August 2013, the team was ranked number 1 in the world. In September 2012, the team was ranked number 1 in the world. In July 2011, the team was ranked number 2 in the world.

== Players ==
There have been a number of players for the Russian squad.

Name	Number	Classification	Position	Years active	Ref
Georgiy Albegov	14	FT6	Forward	2011	
Pavel Borisov	4	FT8		2011	
Aleksei Chesmin / Alexey Chesmin	7	FT7		2011-2012	
Mamuka Dzimistarishvili	19	FT8		2012	
Alexandr Kuligin / Alexander Kuligin	18	FT7		2011-2012	
Andrei Kuvaev	10	FT8		2012	
Viatchislav Larionov / Viacheslav Larionov	15	FT7	Midfielder	2011-2012	
Alexandr Lekov	12	FT7		2012	
Lasha Murvanadze	13	FT8	Midfielder	2011	
Zaurbek Pagaev	17	FT7	Defender	2011	
Ivan Potekhin	8	FT8		2011-2012	
Leonid Priyutilov	18	FT7	Defender	2011	
Eduard Ramonov	20	FT7	Midfielder	2011	
Vladislav Raretskiy	16	FT5	Goalkeeper	2011	
Aslanbek Sapiev	3	FT7	Defender	2011-2012	
Oleg Smirnov	1	FT7	Goalkeeper	2011	
Alexei Tumakov / Alexey Tumakov	6	FT6		2011-2012	
Andrey Zinovyev	19	FT7	Defender	2011	

== Results ==
Russia has participated in a number of international tournaments.

Competition	Location	Year	Total Teams	Result	Ref
CPISRA World Games	Nottingham, England	2015	7	1	
Euro Football 7-a-side	Maia, Portugal	2014	11	3	
Intercontinental Cup	Barcelona, Spain	2013	16		
British Paralympic World Cup	Nottingham, England	2012	12		
Yevpretoria Ukraine	Yevpatoria, Crimea, Ukraine	2012	8		
Forvard International Tournament	Sochi, Russia	2012	5		
Torneo “G. Facchetti”	Pesaro, Italy	2011	4	1	
CPISRA International Championships	Arnhem, Netherlands	2009	11		

=== IFCPF World Championships ===
Russia has participated in the IFCPF World Championships.

World Championships	Location	Total Teams	Result	Ref
2015 IFCPF World Championships	England	15	1	
2011 CPSIRA World Championships	Netherlands	16	1	
2007 CPISRA World Championships	Rio de Janeiro, Brazil		1	
2003 CPISRA World Championships	Buenos Aires, Argentina		3	
1998 CPISRA World Championships	Rio de Janeiro, Brazil		1	

=== Paralympic Games ===
Russia has participated in 7-a-side football at the Paralympic Games dating back to 1996, medaling in each of their appearances at the Games. While they had qualified to compete at the 2016 Summer Paralympics, the Russian team was suspended for the Games. They were replaced by Iran.

Paralympic Results

Games	Results	Ref
2012 Summer Paralympics	1	
2008 Summer Paralympics	2	
2004 Summer Paralympics	3	
2000 Summer Paralympics	1	
1996 Summer Paralympics	2	
