= Swimming at the 2008 Summer Paralympics – Men's 100 metre breaststroke SB7 =

Men's 100m Breaststroke SB7 at the XIII Paralympic Games
- Venue: Beijing National Aquatics Center
- Dates: 9 September
- Competitors: 12 from 10 nations
- Winning time: 1:22.18

Medalists
1st place, gold medalist(s)		Sascha Kindred	Great Britain
2nd place, silver medalist(s)		Blake Cochrane	Australia
3rd place, bronze medalist(s)		Rudy Garcia-Tolson	United States

The men's 100m breaststroke SB7 event at the 2008 Summer Paralympics took place at the Beijing National Aquatics Center on 9 September. There were two heats; the swimmers with the eight fastest times advanced to the final.

== Results ==
=== Heats ===
Competed from 10:28.

==== Heat 1 ====
Rank	Name	Nationality	Time	Notes
1	Tomotaro Nakamura	Japan	1:25.16	Q
2	Rudy Garcia-Tolson	United States	1:25.27	Q
3	Florian Moll	Germany	1:27.51	Q
4	Christoph Burkard	Germany	1:29.08	Q
5	Iaroslav Semenenko	Ukraine	1:29.22	
6	Janos Becsey	Hungary	1:41.40	

==== Heat 2 ====
Rank	Name	Nationality	Time	Notes
1	Sascha Kindred	Great Britain	1:23.31	Q
2	Blake Cochrane	Australia	1:23.69	Q
3	Li Peng	China	1:27.91	Q
4	Mihovil Spanja	Croatia	1:28.82	Q
5	Ruslan Sadvakasov	Russia	1:32.89	
6	Igor Erokhin	Russia	1:33.22	

=== Final ===
Competed at 19:37.

Rank	Name	Nationality	Time	Notes
1st place, gold medalist(s)	Sascha Kindred	Great Britain	1:22.18	WR
2nd place, silver medalist(s)	Blake Cochrane	Australia	1:23.36	
3rd place, bronze medalist(s)	Rudy Garcia-Tolson	United States	1:24.01	
4	Li Peng	China	1:24.43	
5	Tomotaro Nakamura	Japan	1:25.34	
6	Mihovil Spanja	Croatia	1:26.35	
7	Florian Moll	Germany	1:28.31	
8	Christoph Burkard	Germany	1:29.60	

Q = qualified for final. WR = World Record.
