= Football 7-a-side at the 2012 Summer Paralympics =

Football 7-a-side at the XIV Paralympic Games
- Venue: Olympic Hockey Centre
- Dates: 1 – 9 September 2012
- Competitors: 96 (8 teams)

Medalists
1st place, gold medalist(s)		Russia	Russia
2nd place, silver medalist(s)		Ukraine	Ukraine
3rd place, bronze medalist(s)		Iran	Iran

Football 7-a-side at the 2012 Summer Paralympics was held in London at the Olympic Hockey Centre, from 1 September to 9 September. Football 7-a-side is played by athletes with cerebral palsy, a condition characterized by impairment of muscular coordination. 96 footballers are expected to compete for one set of medals.

For these games, the men competed in an 8-team tournament.

== Qualifying ==
Means of qualification	Date	Venue	Berths	Qualified
Host nation			1	Great Britain (GBR)
2010 CPISRA Football 7-a-side European Championships	15–28 August 2010	Glasgow, United Kingdom	1	Ukraine (UKR)
2010 Asian Para Games	12–19 December 2010	Guangzhou, China	1	Iran (IRI)
2010 CPISRA Football 7-a-side Americas Championships	17–27 October 2010	Buenos Aires, Argentina	1	Brazil (BRA)
2011 CPISRA Football 7-a-side World Championships	17 June – 1 July 2011	Drenthe, Netherlands	4	Russia (RUS)
2011 CPISRA Football 7-a-side World Championships	17 June – 1 July 2011	Drenthe, Netherlands	4	Netherlands (NED)
2011 CPISRA Football 7-a-side World Championships	17 June – 1 July 2011	Drenthe, Netherlands	4	Argentina (ARG)
2011 CPISRA Football 7-a-side World Championships	17 June – 1 July 2011	Drenthe, Netherlands	4	United States (USA)
Total			8	

== Group stage ==
=== Group A ===
Pos	Team	Pld	W	D	L	GF	GA	GD	Pts	Qualification
1	Russia (RUS)	3	3	0	0	19	1	+18	9	Qualified for the medal round
2	Iran (IRI)	3	2	0	1	13	5	+8	6	Qualified for the medal round
3	Netherlands (NED)	3	1	0	2	5	13	−8	3	Qualified for the classification round
4	Argentina (ARG)	3	0	0	3	2	20	−18	0	Qualified for the classification round

2012-09-01
9:00

Russia	8–0	Argentina
Kuligin 9', 49'; Murvanadze 21', 30'; Ramonov 35'; Kuvaev 38', 58'; Larionov 54'	Report

Riverbank Arena
Attendance: 4,074
Referee: Stephen Conroy (GBR)

2012-09-01
11:15

Netherlands	1–4	Iran
Straatman 52'	Report	Mehri 4'; Akbari 27'; Karimizadeh 30'; Ansari 60+6'

Riverbank Arena
Attendance: 4,405
Referee: Ross Haswell (GBR)

2012-09-03
14:00

Argentina	1–8	Iran
Fernández Romano 47'	Report	Gholamhosseinpour 2', 60+3'; Mehri 6', 58'; Atashafrouz 13', 14'; Bakhshi 18'; Heidari 29'

Riverbank Arena
Attendance: 10,561
Referee: Garry Polkey (GBR)

2012-09-03
16:15

Russia	8–0	Netherlands
Larionov 23'; Ramonov 30', 50', 54'; Van Altena 34' (o.g.); Murvanadze 36', 39'; Potekhin 60+3'	Report

Riverbank Arena
Attendance: 10,561
Referee: Kevin Wright (GBR)

2012-09-05
9:00

Iran	1–3	Russia
Mehri 36' (pen.)	Report	Kuligin 18'; Larionov 37'; Ramonov 46'

Riverbank Arena
Attendance: 4,276
Referee: Keith Stroud (GBR)

2012-09-05
11:15

Argentina	1–4	Netherlands
Morana 6'	Report	Lokhoff 11', 54'; Visker 19', 45'

Riverbank Arena
Attendance: 4,405
Referee: Scott Henry (GBR)

=== Group B ===
Pos	Team	Pld	W	D	L	GF	GA	GD	Pts	Qualification
1	Ukraine (UKR)	3	2	1	0	17	2	+15	7	Qualified for the medal round
2	Brazil (BRA)	3	2	1	0	12	1	+11	7	Qualified for the medal round
3	Great Britain (GBR)	3	1	0	2	5	10	−5	3	Qualified for the classification round
4	United States (USA)	3	0	0	3	0	21	−21	0	Qualified for the classification round

2012-09-01
14:00

Ukraine	9–0	United States
Shkvarlo 1', 7', 41'; Trushev 10'; Shevchyk 16', 30', 39', 48'; Dutko 32'	Report

Riverbank Arena
Attendance: 11,780
Referee: Hayley Ives (GBR)

2012-09-01
16:15

Great Britain	0–3	Brazil
	Report	Almeida 10'; Silva 13'; Dos Santos 24'

Riverbank Arena
Attendance: 13,247
Referee: Barry Huizinga (NED)

2012-09-03
9:00

United States	0–8	Brazil
	Report	Almeida 5', 19'; Guimarães 20', 39' da Silva 33', 55'; Tostes 49', 57'

Riverbank Arena
Attendance: 4,529
Referee: David Davies (GBR)

2012-09-03
11:15

Ukraine	7–1	Great Britain
Antoniuk 1', 47'; Shevchyk 9', 10'; Devlysh 15', 54'; Ponomaryov 58'	Report	Diallo 41'

Riverbank Arena
Attendance: 9,329
Referee: Álvaro Azeredo (BRA)

2012-09-05
14:00

Brazil	1–1	Ukraine
Dos Santos Ribeiro 9'	Report	Dotsenko 35'

Riverbank Arena
Attendance: 9,994
Referee: Tom Nield (GBR)

2012-09-05
16:15

United States	0–4	Great Britain
	Report	Richmond 20'; Fletcher 44'; Diallo 53'; Paterson 60+2'

Riverbank Arena
Attendance: 12,274
Referee: Álvaro Azeredo Quelhas (BRA)

== Knockout stage ==
=== Classification round ===
==== 5th–8th place semi-finals ====
2012-09-07
9:00

Netherlands	5–0	United States
Straatman 16', 33'; Visker 35'; Swinkels 39' (pen.); Kooij 59'	Report

Riverbank Arena
Attendance: 3,848
Referee: Alex Kirkley (GBR)

2012-09-07
11:30

Great Britain	3–4 (a.e.t.)	Argentina
Diallo 14'; Dimbylow 27'; Patrick-Heselton 78'	Report	Lugrin 29'; Vivot 40', 69', 73'

Riverbank Arena
Attendance: 9,942
Referee: Barry Huizinga (NED)

==== 7th–8th place match ====
2012-09-09
8:30

United States	1–3 (a.e.t.)	Great Britain
Renteria 20'	Report	Barker 29'; Diallo 70'; Fletcher 74'

Riverbank Arena
Attendance: 10,561
Referee: Barry Huizinga (NED)

==== 5th–6th place match ====
2012-09-09
11:00

Netherlands	3–0	Argentina
Visker 9', 12', 18'	Report

Riverbank Arena
Attendance: 7,490
Referee: Álvaro Azeredo Quelhas (BRA)

=== Medal round ===
==== Semi-finals ====
2012-09-07
14:00

Russia	3–1	Brazil
Larionov 23'; Potekhin 34'; Kuligin 48'	Report	Silva de Oliveira 26'

Riverbank Arena
Attendance: 7,383
Referee: Ross Haswell (GBR)

2012-09-07
17:30

Ukraine	2–1	Iran
Dotsenko 37'; Shkvarlo 57'	Report	Bakhshi 51'

Riverbank Arena
Attendance: 2,900
Referee: Stephen Conroy (GBR)

==== Bronze medal match ====
2012-09-09
13:30

Brazil	0–5	Iran
	Report	Atashafrouz 17', 23'; Mehri 20', 60+1'; Bakhshi 57'

Riverbank Arena
Attendance: 11,197
Referee: Kevin Wright (GBR)

==== Gold medal match ====
2012-09-09
16:00

Russia	1–0	Ukraine
Ramonov 44'	Report

Riverbank Arena
Attendance: 13,360
Referee: Keith Stroud (GBR)

== Medalists ==
Event	Gold	Silver	Bronze
Men's team	Russia; Aleksandr Lekov; Vladislav Raretckii; Aslanbek Sapiev; Alexey Tumakov; Lasha Murvanadze; Aleksei Chesmin; Ivan Potekhin (captain); Eduard Ramonov; Viacheslav Larionov; Zaurbek Pagaev; Andrei Kuvaev; Aleksandr Kuligin	Ukraine; Kostyantyn Symashko; Ihor Kosenko; Vitaliy Trushev; Yevhen Zinoviev; Taras Dutko; Anatolii Shevchyk; Oleksiy Hetun; Volodymyr Antonyuk (captain); Ivan Shkvarlo; Ivan Dotsenko; Denys Ponomaryov; Oleksandr Devlysh	Iran; Mehran Nikoee Majd; Moslem Khazaeipirsarabi; Ehsan Gholamhosseinpour Bousheh; Morteza Heidari; Bahman Ansari; Hashem Rastegarimobin; Sadegh Hassani Baghi; Farzad Mehri; Jasem Bakhshi; Moslem Akbari (captain); Rasoul Atashafrouz; Abdolreza Karimizadeh

== See also ==
- Football 5-a-side at the 2012 Summer Paralympics
- Football at the 2012 Summer Olympics
