= Aleksandr Kuligin =

Russian footballer (born 1991)

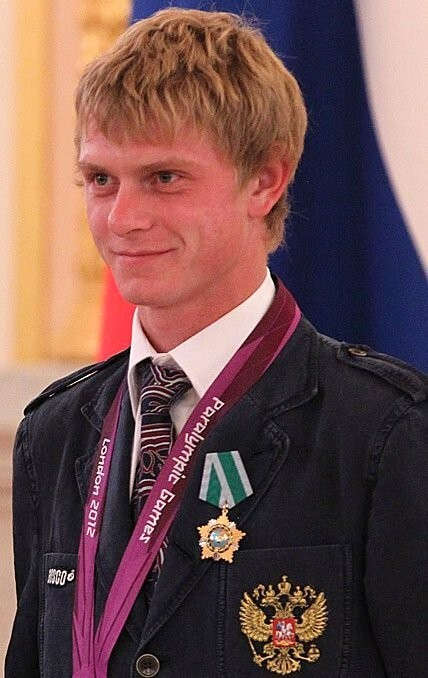
- Kuligin in 2012

Personal information
- Full name: Aleksandr Vasilievich Kuligin
- Born: 5 February 1991 (age 35) Dzerzhinsk, Russia

Sport
- Country: Russia
- Sport: CP football
Medal record
Men's 7-a-side football
Representing Russia
Paralympic Games
Gold medal – first place	2012 London	Team

Aleksandr Vasilievich Kuligin (Russian: Александр Васильевич Кулигин; born 5 February 1991 in Dzerzhinsk) is a Russian football defender. He was the captain of the Russian team that won gold medals at the 2012 Summer Paralympics.
