= Oleksandr Devlysh =

Ukrainian Paralympic footballer

Personal information
- Nationality: Ukrainian
- Born: 2 November 1986 (age 39)
Medal record
Men's 7-a-side football
Representing Ukraine
Paralympic Games
Gold medal – first place	2008 Beijing	Team
Silver medal – second place	2012 London	Team
Cerebral Palsy Games
Gold medal – first place	2009 Netherlands	Team
Gold medal – first place	2013 Sant Cugat del Vallès	Team
European Championships
Gold medal – first place	2006 Ireland	Team
Gold medal – first place	2010 Scotland	Team
Gold medal – first place	2014 Portugal	Team

Oleksandr Devlysh (Ukrainian: Олександр Девлиш, born 2 November 1986) is a Ukrainian Paralympic footballer who won a gold medal at the 2008 Summer Paralympics in Beijing, China. During the Paralympics his team beat Brazil 6-0 and then, during the final, beat Russia 2–0. In 2013 he participated at the 2013 Cerebral Palsy Games for which he won top scorer award and where his team won 1–0 against Brazil.
