= Ihor Kosenko =

Ukrainian Paralympic footballer

Personal information
- Nationality: Ukrainian
- Born: 3 November 1977 (age 48)
Medal record
Men's 7-a-side football
Representing Ukraine
Paralympic Games
Gold medal – first place	2004 Athens	Team
Gold medal – first place	2008 Beijing	Team
Silver medal – second place	2012 London	Team
World Championships
Gold medal – first place	2003 Argentina	Team
Gold medal – first place	2009 Netherlands	Team
Silver medal – second place	2005 United States	Team
Bronze medal – third place	2011 Netherlands	Team
European Championships
Gold medal – first place	2002 Ukraine	Team
Gold medal – first place	2006 Ireland	Team

Ihor Kosenko (Ukrainian: Ігор Косенко; born 3 November 1977) is a Ukrainian Paralympic footballer who won a gold medal at the 2008 Summer Paralympics in China.

== Awards ==
Ihor Kosenko is a recipient of various Order of Merit awards, including:

- Order of Merit, 1st class (2008)
- Order of Merit, 2nd class (2004)
- Order of Merit, 3rd class (2003)
- Order For Courage, 3rd class (2012)
