= Ibrahima Diallo (Paralympic footballer) =

English footballer (born 1993)

Ibrahima Diallo (born 16 January 1993) is an English footballer. He played in the 7-a-side football event at the 2012 Summer Paralympics in London.

== Personal life ==
Diallo was born on 16 January 1993 in Conakry, Guinea. He moved to England at the age of ten with his parents and two siblings.

In December 2011 he was diagnosed with cerebral palsy after a physiotherapist, who also worked with the British Paralympic team, noticed his unusual running style during a training session for the English College's team at Lilleshall. Diallo had previously attributed his problems when running to tight muscle groups in his thigh.

== Football ==
As a teenager Diallo played for the Bristol City F.C. academy teams. Since February 2012 he has played for the Great Britain 7-a-side team for players with cerebral palsy.

In 2012, he was a member of the Great Britain team that won a silver medal at the 2012 Paralympic World Cup. The British team were beaten 4–2 by Brazil, the team ranked fourth in the world, in the final of the tournament which was held in Manchester. Diallo and Patrick Heselton each scored consolation goals for Great Britain after Brazil had taken a 4–0 lead. Diallo had also scored a hat-trick of goals in a 7–3 win over Ireland in the final group match which qualified the British team for the final.

He represented Great Britain at the 2012 Summer Paralympics as part of a twelve-player squad for the 7-a-side football event. He scored a goal in four different matches but Great Britain finished 7th of the 8 teams.

In his domestic football career Diallo moved from Clevedon Town to Mangotsfield United in March 2014. He had previously also played for Filton Academy and Paulton Rovers.

Diallo currently plays for Bitton AFC.
