= Olympic Green Hockey Field =

Temporary sports venue in Beijing, China

Coordinates: 40°0′56″N 116°22′15″E

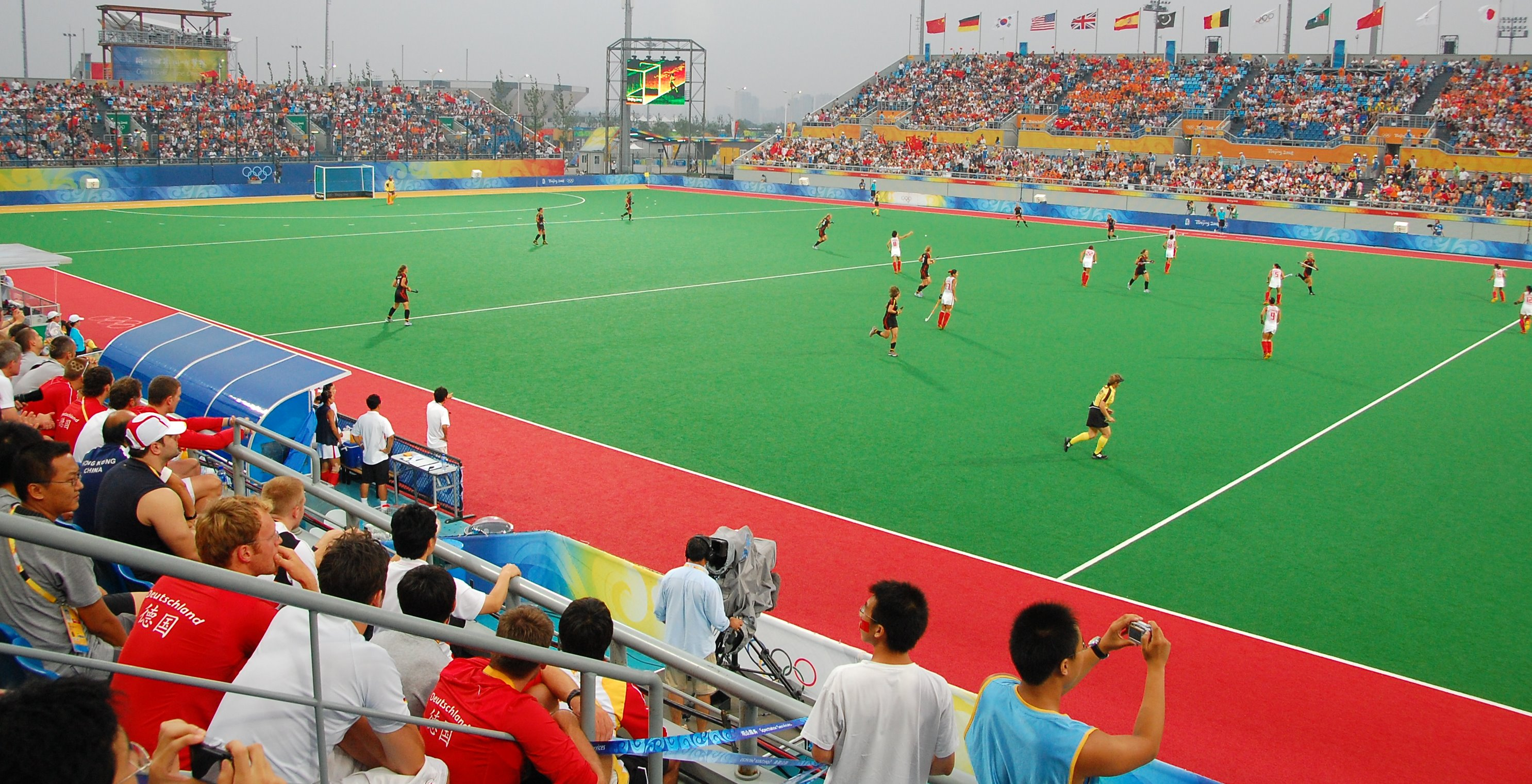
Olympic Green Hockey Field during the 2008 Summer Olympics

The Olympic Green Hockey Field (simplified Chinese: 北京奥林匹克公园曲棍球场; traditional Chinese: 北京奧林匹克公園曲棍球場; pinyin: Běijīng Àolínpǐkè Gōngyuán Qūgùnqiú Chǎng) was one of nine temporary venues used for the 2008 Summer Olympics. It hosted the field hockey competitions during the Olympics and the football-5-a-side and 7-a-side events during the 2008 Summer Paralympics.

It covered an area of 11.87 hectares with 2 pitches and could seat 17,002 fans. It became the home of China men's and women's national field hockey teams.

It was torn down to make room for the Beijing National Speed Skating Oval.
