= Football 7-a-side at the 2008 Summer Paralympics =

Football 7-a-side at the XIII Paralympic Games
- Venue: Olympic Green Hockey Field
- Dates: 8–16 September 2008
- Competitors: 8 teams

Medalists
1st place, gold medalist(s)		Ukraine	Ukraine
2nd place, silver medalist(s)		Russia	Russia
3rd place, bronze medalist(s)		Iran	Iran

7-a-side football at the 2008 Summer Paralympics was held at the Olympic Green Hockey Field from September 8 to September 16. One event was contested, a men's team competition.

== Classification ==
The sport of 7-a-side football is for people with cerebral palsy; athletes classified as CP5 through CP8 may take part. The classification system grades player by the extent of their disability, with lower numbers corresponding to more severe impairment. At least one CP5 or CP6 player, and no more than three CP8 players, may be on the field at a given time.

== Participating teams ==
Eight teams qualified for the football 7-a-side tournament in the 2008 Summer Paralympics.

Russia; Pavel Borisov; Alexey Chesmin; Mamuka Dzimistarishvili; Stanislav Kolykhalov; Andrey Kuvaev; Alexander Lekov; Andrey Lozhechnikov; Lasha Murvandze; Georgy Nadzharyan; Ivan Potekhin; Oleg Smirnov; Aleksey Tumakov	Brazil; Fabiano Bruzzi; Adriano Costa; Irineu Ferreira; Marcos Ferreira; José Guimarães; Leandro Marinho; Gilberto Moraes; Wanderson Oliveira; Antôonio Rocha; Luciano Rocha; Jean Rodrigues; Marcos Silva	Netherlands; Bart Adelaars; Jeffrey Bruiner; Stephan Lokhoff; Joey Mense; Pawel Statema; Johannes Straatman; Johannes Swinkels; Rudy van Breemen; Martijn van de Ven; Hendrikus van Kempen; Thieu van Don; Johannes Voogd	China; Dong Xinliang; Fan Zhichao; He Jinghua; Lang Yunlong; Li Chuan; Liu Bo; Wu Gang; Xu Guojun; Yang Wenshun; Yang Ye; Zhu Xu; Zhuge Bin
Ukraine; Volodymyr Antonyuk; Oleksandr Devlysh; Taras Dutko; Ihor Kosenko; Mykola Mikhovych; Denys Ponomaryov; Anatolii Shevchyk; Ivan Shkvarlo; Kostyantyn Symashko; Vitaliy Trushev; Andriy Tsukanov; Serhiy Vakulenko	Iran; Moslem Akbari; Bahman Ansari; Rasoul Atashafrouz; Ehsan Gholam Hosseinpour; Morteza Heidari; Habibollah Heidari Mehr; Abdolreza Karimzadeh; Ardeshir Mahini; Esmaeil Malekzadeh Nash; Gholamreza Najafitovahkhoshgeh; Hadi Safari	Ireland; Aidan Brennan; Kieran Patrick Devlin; Paul Dollard; Luke Evans; Mark Gerard Jones; Darren Kavanagh; Derek Michael Malone; Joseph James Markey; Brian McGillivary; Gary Messett; Alan O'Hara; Finbarr O'Riordan	Great Britain; Michael Barker; Matthew Dimbylow; Matthew Ellis; Richard Fox; Roy Gordon Grainger; Kieran Martin; Graeme Paterson; Jonathan Paterson; Jordan Raynes; Mark Robertson; Leon Taylor; Michael Wilson

== Competition format ==
The eight teams were divided into two even groups for a single round robin group stage. The top two teams of each group qualified for the semifinal, while the lower two teams from each group competed for 5th through 8th places. Games consisted of two 30-minute halves. A victory ceremony was held just after the finish of the gold medal match, at 18:00 on September 16.

== Group stage ==
=== Group A ===
Team	Pld	W	D	L	GF	GA	GD	Pts
Russia (RUS)	3	3	0	0	21	1	+20	9
Brazil (BRA)	3	2	0	1	9	3	+6	6
Netherlands (NED)	3	1	0	2	9	14	−5	3
China (CHN)	3	0	0	3	1	22	−21	0

2008-09-08
9:00

Russia	6 – 0	China

Olympic Green Hockey Field
2008-09-08
11:15

Brazil	1 – 0	Netherlands

Olympic Green Hockey Field
2008-09-10
13:30

Russia	12 – 1	Netherlands

Olympic Green Hockey Field
2008-09-10
15:45

Brazil	8 – 0	China

Olympic Green Hockey Field
2008-09-12
9:00

Russia	3 – 0	Brazil

Olympic Green Hockey Field
2008-09-12
11:15

Netherlands	8 – 1	China

Olympic Green Hockey Field

=== Group B ===
Team	Pld	W	D	L	GF	GA	GD	Pts
Ukraine (UKR)	3	3	0	0	19	1	+18	9
Iran (IRI)	3	2	0	1	7	6	+1	6
Ireland (IRL)	3	0	1	2	3	12	−9	1
Great Britain (GBR)	3	0	1	2	2	12	−10	1

2008-09-08
13:30

Iran	4 – 2	Ireland

Olympic Green Hockey Field
2008-09-08
15:45

Ukraine	8 – 1	Great Britain

Olympic Green Hockey Field
Attendance: 5,141
Referee: Kou Yadong (China)
2008-09-10
9:00

Iran	3 – 0	Great Britain

Olympic Green Hockey Field
Attendance: 5,500
2008-09-10
11:15

Ukraine	7 – 0	Ireland

Olympic Green Hockey Field
Attendance: 6,763
2008-09-12
13:30

Iran	0 – 4	Ukraine

Olympic Green Hockey Field
2008-09-12
15:45

Great Britain	1 – 1	Ireland

Olympic Green Hockey Field

== Knockout stage ==
=== Classification round ===
==== 5th–8th place semi-finals ====
2008-09-14
9:00

Netherlands	4 – 2	Great Britain

Olympic Green Hockey Field
2008-09-14
11:30

China	1 – 4	Ireland

Olympic Green Hockey Field

==== 7th–8th place match ====
2008-09-16
9:00

Great Britain	10 – 2	China
Dimbylow 1'; Barker 18', 41', 54', 61'; Robertson 20'; Gordon 28'; G. Paterson 31+'; Ellis 39'; J. Paterson 48'	(Report)	Fan 40', 60'

Olympic Green Hockey Field A
Attendance: 4235
Referee: Fang Aijun (China)

==== 5th–6th place match ====
2008-09-16
11:30

Netherlands	4 – 2	Ireland
Voogd 5' van de Ven 24'; Lokhoff 31+', 38'	(Report)	O'Riordan 7'; Messett 11' (yellow card) 16'

Olympic Green Hockey Field A
Attendance: 7142
Referee: Kou Yadong (China)

=== Medal round ===
==== Semifinal ====
2008-09-14
14:00

Brazil	0 – 6	Ukraine

Olympic Green Hockey Field
2008-09-14
16:30

Russia	5 – 0	Iran

Olympic Green Hockey Field

==== Bronze medal match ====
2008-09-16
14:00

Brazil	0 – 4	Iran
	(Report)	Karimzadeh 5', 17', 21' (yellow card) 44'; Malekzadeh (yellow card) 47'; Mahini (yellow card) 54'; Akbari (yellow card) 61' (goal) 64'

Olympic Green Hockey Field A
Attendance: 11266
Referee: Jorge Eduardo Barbisan (Argentina)

==== Gold medal match ====
2008-09-16
16:30

Ukraine	2 – 1 (a.e.t.)	Russia
Antonyuk 69', 71'	(Report)	Borisov (yellow card) 19'; Potekhin (yellow card) 24'; Kuvaev (yellow card) 31'; Murvanadze 74'

Olympic Green Hockey Field A
Attendance: 11267
Referee: Guido Gonzalez (Ecuador)

== Medallists ==
Event	Gold	Silver	Bronze
Men's team	Ukraine (UKR) Volodymyr Antonyuk (captain); Kostyantyn Symashko; Vitaliy Trushev; Serhiy Vakulenko; Taras Dutko; Anatolii Shevchyk; Oleksandr Devlysh; Ivan Shkvarlo; Andriy Tsukanov; Denys Ponomaryov; Mykola Mikhovych; Ihor Kosenko; Coach: Sergiy Ovcharenko	Russia (RUS) Ivan Potekhin (captain); Alexander Lekov; Lasha Murvanadze; Pavel Borisov; Aleksey Tumakov; Alexey Chesmin; Andrey Kuvaev; Oleg Smirnov; Andrey Lozhechnikov; Georgy Nadzharyan; Mamuka Dzimistarishvili; Stanislav Kolykhalov; Coach: Avtandil Baramidze	Iran (IRI) Ardeshir Mahini (captain); Esmaeil Malekzadeh; Bahman Ansari; Morteza Heidari; Ehsan Gholam-Hosseinpour; Moslem Akbari; Abdolreza Karimzadeh; Habibollah Heidari-Mehr; Gholamreza Najafi; Hadi Safari; Rasoul Atash-Afrouz; Coach: Alireza Raadi
