= Taras Dutko =

Ukrainian Paralympic footballer

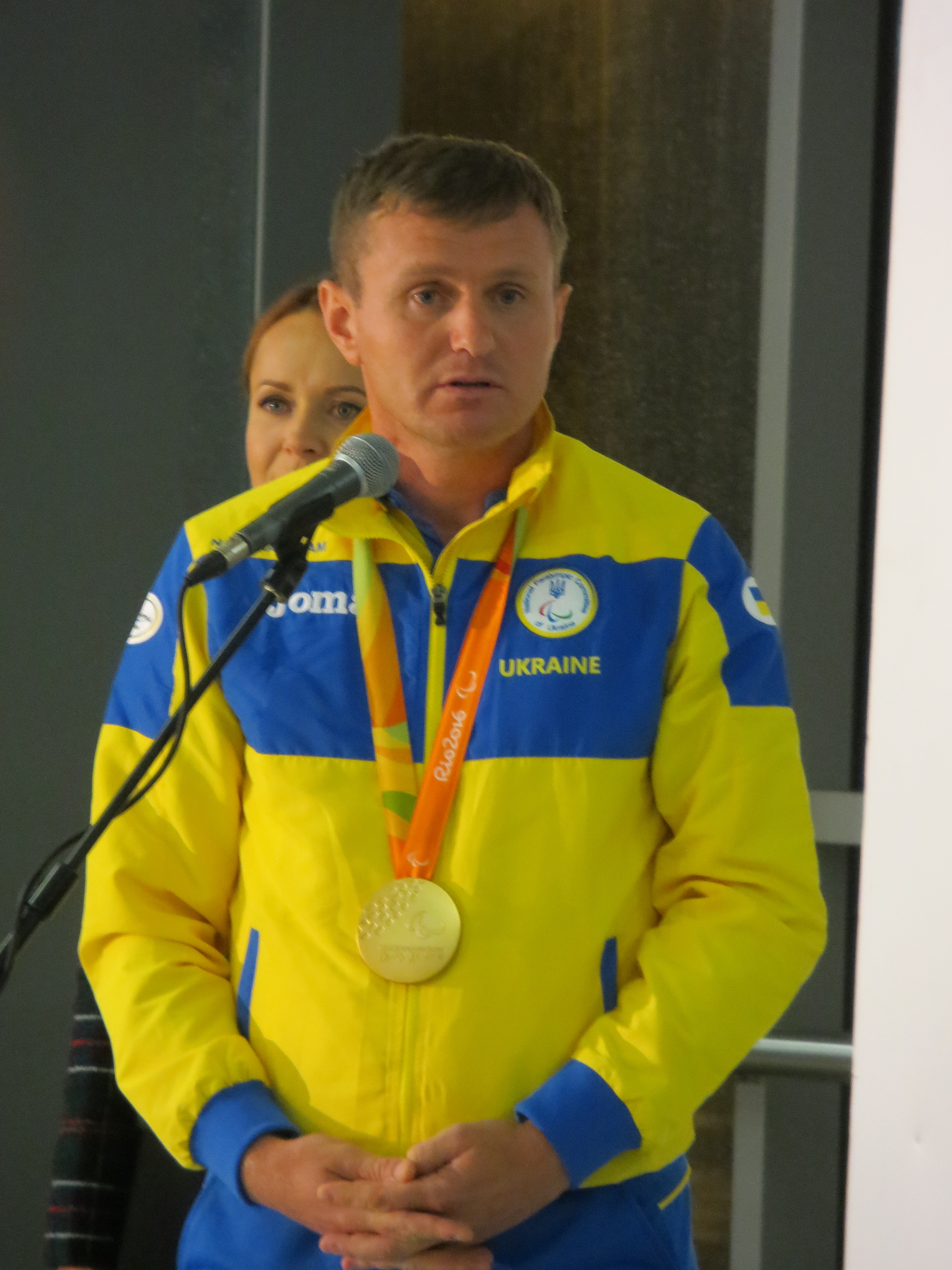

Personal information
- Nationality: Ukrainian
- Born: 27 January 1982 (age 44)
Medal record
Men's 7-a-side football
Representing Ukraine
Paralympic Games
Gold medal – first place	2004 Athens	Team
Gold medal – first place	2008 Beijing	Team
Gold medal – first place	2016 Rio de Janeiro	Team
Silver medal – second place	2000 Sydney	Team
Silver medal – second place	2012 London	Team
World Championships
Gold medal – first place	2001 England	Team
Gold medal – first place	2003 Argentina	Team
Gold medal – first place	2009 Netherlands	Team
Gold medal – first place	2013 Spain	Team
Gold medal – first place	2017 Argentina	Team
Silver medal – second place	1998 Brazil	Team
Silver medal – second place	2005 United States	Team
Silver medal – second place	2015 England	Team
Bronze medal – third place	2007 Brazil	Team
Bronze medal – third place	2011 Netherlands	Team
European Championships
Gold medal – first place	1999 Belgium	Team
Gold medal – first place	2002 Ukraine	Team
Gold medal – first place	2006 Ireland	Team
Gold medal – first place	2010 Scotland	Team
Gold medal – first place	2014 Portugal	Team
Silver medal – second place	2018 Netherlands	Team

Taras Dutko (Ukrainian: Тарас Дутко, born 27 January 1982) is a Ukrainian Paralympic footballer with cerebral palsy, who won a gold medal at the 2008 Summer Paralympics in Beijing, China. He started playing football in 2000 and since then participated at the 2004, 2008 and 2016 Summer Paralympics.
