= Aslanbek Sapiev =

Russian Paralympic footballer

Personal information
- Nationality: Russia
- Born: 27 March 1993 (age 33) Vladikavkaz, Russia
- Height: 1.80 m (5 ft 11 in)

Sport
- Club: Stimul
- Coached by: Avtandil Baramidze
Medal record
Men's 7-a-side football
Representing Russia
Paralympic Games
Gold medal – first place	2012 London	Team
World Championships
Gold medal – first place	2011 The Nederlands	Team

Aslanbek Sapiev (Russian: Асланбек Сапиев; born 27 March 1993) is a Russian Paralympic footballer. Born in Vladikavkaz, Russia, he is a graduate of North Ossetian State University and a winner of 2011 World Championship.
