= Volodymyr Antonyuk =

Ukrainian Paralympic footballer

Personal information
- Nationality: Ukrainian
- Born: 10 May 1979 (age 47)
Medal record
Men's 7-a-side football
Representing Ukraine
Paralympic Games
Gold medal – first place	2004 Athens	Team
Gold medal – first place	2008 Beijing	Team
Gold medal – first place	2016 Rio de Janeiro	Team
Silver medal – second place	2000 Sydney	Team
World Championships
Gold medal – first place	2003 Argentina	Team
Gold medal – first place	2013 Spain	Team
Gold medal – first place	2017 Argentina	Team
Silver medal – second place	2015 England	Team
Bronze medal – third place	2011 Netherlands	Team
European Championships
Gold medal – first place	2002 Ukraine	Team
Gold medal – first place	2006 Ireland	Team
Gold medal – first place	2010 Scotland	Team
Gold medal – first place	2014 Portugal	Team

Volodymyr Antonyuk (Ukrainian: Володимир Антонюк, born 10 May 1979) is a Ukrainian 7-a-side footballer who won three Paralympic gold medals.
