= Stanislav Kolykhalov =

Russian Paralympic footballer

Personal information
- Nationality: Russia
- Born: 2 November 1986 (age 39) Naro-Fominsk
Medal record
Men's 7-a-side football
Representing Russia
Paralympic Games
Silver medal – second place	2008 Beijing	Team

Stanislav Kolykhalov (Russian: Станислав Колыхалов, born 2 November 1986 in Naro-Fominsk) is a Russian Paralympic footballer who won a silver medal at the 2008 Summer Paralympic Games in China.
