= Ivan Potekhin =

Russian footballer

Personal information
- Nationality: Russian
- Born: 8 April 1981 (age 45) Dzerzhinsk, Russia
Medal record
Men's 7-a-side football
Representing Russia
Paralympic Games
Gold medal – first place	2012 London	Team
Silver medal – second place	2008 Beijing	Team
Bronze medal – third place	2004 Athens	Team

Ivan Potekhin (Russian: Иван Потехин, born 8 April 1981 in Dzerzhinsk) is a Russian Paralympic 7-a-side footballer.

Potekhin participated in the 2004, 2008 and 2012 Summer Paralympics.
