= Georgy Nadzharyan =

Russian Paralympic footballer

Personal information
- Nationality: Russian
Medal record
Men's 7-a-side football
Representing Russia
Paralympic Games
Silver medal – second place	2008 Beijing	Team

Georgy Nadzharyan (Russian: Георгий Наджарян) is a Russian Paralympic footballer who won a silver medal at the 2008 Summer Paralympics in China.
