= Andrey Kuvaev =

Russian Paralympic footballer

Personal information
- Nationality: Russian
- Born: 8 June 1983 (age 43) Dzerzhinsk, Russia
Medal record
Men's 7-a-side football
Representing Russia
Paralympic Games
Silver medal – second place	2008 Beijing	Team
Bronze medal – third place	2004 Athens	Team

Andrey Valeryevich Kuvaev (Russian: Андрей Валерьевич Куваев; born 8 June 1983) is a Russian football official and a former Paralympic footballer who won a silver medal at the 2008 Summer Paralympic Games in China. He is the director of FC Khimik Dzerzhinsk.
