= Alexander Lekov =

Russian Paralympic footballer

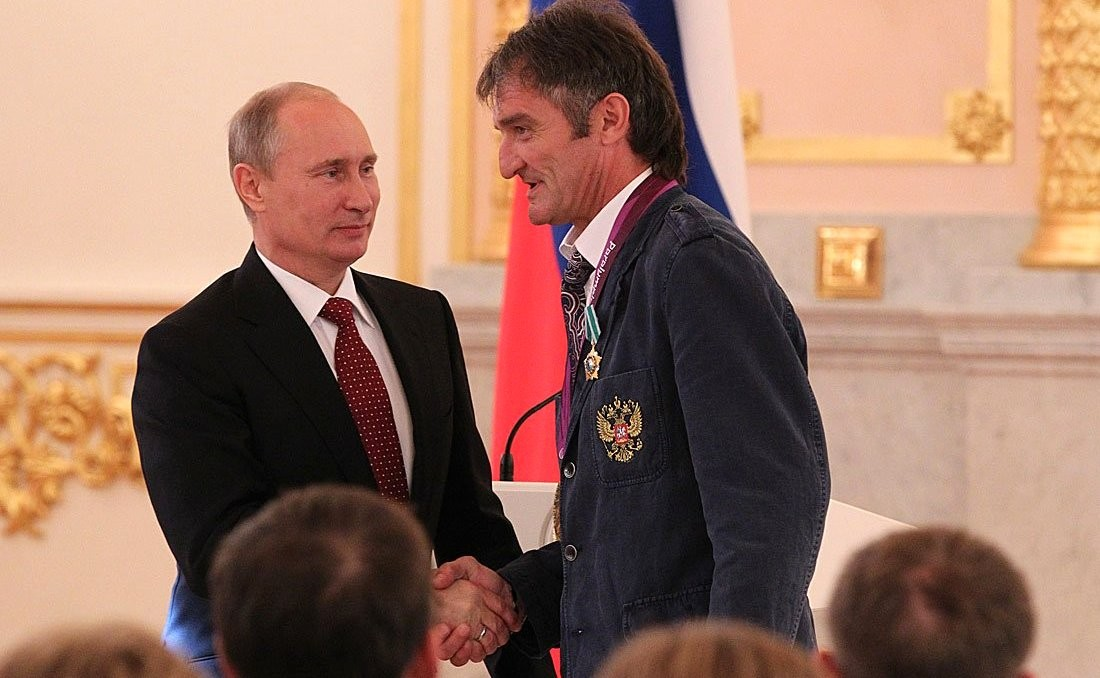
- Vladimir Putin and Alexander Lekov in 2012

Personal information
- Nationality: Russian
- Born: 29 June 1968 (age 57) Vladikavkaz, Russia
Medal record
Men's 7-a-side football
Representing Russia
Paralympic Games
| Silver medal – second place | 2008 Beijing | Team |

Alexander Lekov (Russian: Александр Леков, born 29 June 1968 in Vladikavkaz) is a Russian Paralympic footballer who won a silver medal at the 2008 Summer Paralympics in China.
