= Alexey Chesmin =

Russian Paralympic footballer

Personal information
- Nationality: Russian
- Born: 7 February 1986 (age 40) Elektrogorsk

Sport
- Club: Lev Chernoy Olympia
Medal record
Men's 7-a-side football
Representing Russia
Paralympic Games
Gold medal – first place	2012 London	Team
Silver medal – second place	2008 Beijing	Team

Alexey Chesmin (Russian: Алексей Чесмин, born 7 February 1986 in Elektrogorsk) is a Russian Paralympic footballer who won a silver medal during the 2008 Summer Paralympics in China.
