= Aleksey Tumakov =

Russian Paralympic footballer

Personal information
- Nationality: Russian
- Born: 28 August 1983 (age 42) Vyborg
Medal record
Men's 7-a-side football
Representing Russia
Paralympic Games
Silver medal – second place	2008 Beijing	Team

Aleksey Tumakov (Russian: Алексе́й Тумако́в, born 28 August 1983 in Vyborg) is a Russian Paralympic footballer who won a silver medal at the 2008 Summer Paralympic Games in China.
