= Football 7-a-side at the Summer Paralympics =

- Events: 1 (men)

Games
- 1960; 1964; 1968; 1972; 1976; 1980; 1984; 1988; 1992; 1996; 2000; 2004; 2008; 2012; 2016; 2020; 2024
- Medalists

Football 7-a-side was contested at the Summer Paralympics between 1984 and 2016. At the 1984 Summer Paralympics, two events were held—one for men with wheelchairs and one for men standing. Every Summer Paralympics since then has consisted of only a standing men's team event; women have never competed.

Football 7-a-side was dropped from the 2020 Summer Paralympics; the IPC rejected a bid for it to be reinstated at the 2024 Summer Paralympics, citing insufficient development in the sport among women.

== Men's wheelchair medalists ==
Year	Gold	Silver	Bronze
1984	United States (USA)	Canada (CAN)	Great Britain (GBR)

== Men's CP medalists ==
Year	Gold	Silver	Bronze
1984	Belgium (BEL)	Ireland (IRL)	Great Britain (GBR)
1988	Netherlands (NED)	Belgium (BEL)	Ireland (IRL)
1992	Netherlands (NED)	Portugal (POR)	Ireland (IRL)
1996	Netherlands (NED)	Russia (RUS)	Spain (ESP)
2000	Russia (RUS)	Ukraine (UKR)	Brazil (BRA)
2004	Ukraine (UKR)	Brazil (BRA)	Russia (RUS)
2008	Ukraine (UKR)	Russia (RUS)	Iran (IRI)
2012	Russia (RUS)	Ukraine (UKR)	Iran (IRI)
2016	Ukraine (UKR)	Iran (IRI)	Brazil (BRA)

== List of finals ==
Year	Host	Winner	Score	Runner-up	Third place	Score	Fourth place	Number of teams	Ref.
1984; Details	(United States); New York	Belgium	1–0	(Republic of Ireland); Ireland	(United Kingdom); Great Britain	3–1	Portugal	6	
1988; Details	(South Korea); Seoul	Netherlands	^{1}	Belgium	(Republic of Ireland); Ireland	^{1}	South Korea	5	
1992; Details	(Spain); Barcelona	Netherlands	3–2	Portugal	(Republic of Ireland); Ireland	2–1	(United Kingdom); Great Britain	8	
1996; Details	(United States); Atlanta	Netherlands	3–1	Russia	Spain	2–1	United States	8	
2000; Details	(Australia); Sydney	Russia	3–2	Ukraine	Brazil	2–1	Portugal	8	
2004; Details	(Greece); Athens	Ukraine	4–1	Brazil	Russia	5–0	Argentina	8	
2008; Details	(China); Beijing	Ukraine	2–1 (a.e.t.)	Russia	Iran	4–0	Brazil	8	
2012; Details	(United Kingdom); London	Russia	1–0	Ukraine	Iran	5–0	Brazil	8	
2016; Details	(Brazil); Rio de Janeiro	Ukraine	2–1 (a.e.t.)	Iran	Brazil	3–1	Netherlands	8	

1 = The tournament was played in a group mode.

- a.e.t.: after extra time
- p: after penalty shoot-out

== Medal table ==
Rank	Nation	Gold	Silver	Bronze	Total
1	Ukraine (UKR)	3	2	0	5
2	Netherlands (NED)	3	0	0	3
3	Russia (RUS)	2	2	1	5
4	Belgium (BEL)	1	1	0	2
5	United States (USA)	1	0	0	1
6	Brazil (BRA)	0	1	2	3
6	Iran (IRI)	0	1	2	3
6	Ireland (IRL)	0	1	2	3
9	Canada (CAN)	0	1	0	1
9	Portugal (POR)	0	1	0	1
11	Great Britain (GBR)	0	0	2	2
12	Spain (ESP)	0	0	1	1
Totals (12 entries)		10	10	10	30

== Participating nations ==
- : denotes nation that did not take part in that year.

X : denotes nation that did not advance into the final rounds.

Nation	1984 CP / Wheel	1988	1992	1996	2000	2004	2008	2012	2016	Years
Argentina	-	-	-	X	X	4	-	6	6	5
Australia	-	X	-	-	X	-	-	-	-	2
Belgium	(gold) / -	2nd place, silver medalist(s)	X	-	-	-	-	-	-	3
Brazil	-	-	X	X	3rd place, bronze medalist(s)	2nd place, silver medalist(s)	4	4	3rd place, bronze medalist(s)	7
Canada	X / (silver)	-	-	-	-	-	-	-	-	1
China	-	-	-	-	-	-	8	-	-	1
Great Britain	(bronze) / (bronze)	-	4	-	-	-	7	7	5	5
Iran	-	-	-	-	-	5	3rd place, bronze medalist(s)	3rd place, bronze medalist(s)	2nd place, silver medalist(s)	4
Ireland	(silver) / -	3rd place, bronze medalist(s)	3rd place, bronze medalist(s)	X	-	7	6	-	8	7
Netherlands	-	1st place, gold medalist(s)	1st place, gold medalist(s)	1st place, gold medalist(s)	X	6	5	5	4	8
Portugal	4 / -	-	2nd place, silver medalist(s)	X	4	-	-	-	-	4
Russia	-	-	-	2nd place, silver medalist(s)	1st place, gold medalist(s)	3rd place, bronze medalist(s)	2nd place, silver medalist(s)	1st place, gold medalist(s)	-	5
South Korea	-	X	-	-	-	-	-	-	-	1
Spain	-	-	X	3rd place, bronze medalist(s)	X	-	-	-	-	3
Ukraine	-	-	-	-	2nd place, silver medalist(s)	1st place, gold medalist(s)	1st place, gold medalist(s)	2nd place, silver medalist(s)	1st place, gold medalist(s)	5
United States	X / (gold)	-	X	4	-	8	-	8	7	6

== Complete Results ==
1. https://www.paralympic.org/stoke-mandeville-new-york-1984/results/football-7-side
2. https://www.paralympic.org/seoul-1988/results/football-7-side
3. https://www.paralympic.org/barcelona-1992/results/football-7-side
4. https://www.paralympic.org/atlanta-1996/results/football-7-side
5. https://www.paralympic.org/sydney-2000/results/football-7-side
6. https://www.paralympic.org/athens-2004/results/football-7-side
7. https://www.paralympic.org/beijing-2008/results/football-7-side
8. https://www.paralympic.org/london-2012/results/football-7-side
9. https://www.paralympic.org/rio-2016/results/football-7-side

== See also ==
- Football 5-a-side at the Summer Paralympics
- Football at the Summer Olympics
