= 2014 IPC Swimming European Championships – Men's 50 metre freestyle =

The men's 50 metre freestyle at the 2014 IPC Swimming European Championships was held at the Pieter van den Hoogenband Swimming Stadium in Eindhoven from 4–10 August.

== Medalists ==
Event	Gold		Silver		Bronze	
S1	Hennadii Boiko; Ukraine	1:09.84	Itzhak Mamistvalov; Israel	1:13.13	Anton Kol; Ukraine	1:18.76
S2	Dmitrii Kokarev; Russia	58.43 WR	Serhii Palamarchuk; Ukraine	1:00.50	Jacek Czech; Poland	1:02.22
S3	Dmytro Vynohradets; Ukraine	49.51	Ioannis Kostakis; Greece	51.60	Miguel Angel Martinez; Spain	53.13
S4	Richard Oribe; Spain	41.12	Arnost Petracek; Czech Republic	41.47	Andrii Derevinskyi; Ukraine	42.90
S5	Sebastián Rodríguez; Spain	36.12	Andrew Mullen; Great Britain	34.09	Kirill Popov; Russia	36.50
S6	Sebastian Iwanow; Germany	31.77	Sascha Kindred; Great Britain	32.46	Panagiotis Christakis; Greece	32.85
S7	Yevheniy Bohodayko; Ukraine	27.93	Matthew Walker; Great Britain	28.19	Sergey Sukharev; Russia	28.32
S8	Denis Tarasov; Russia	25.32 WR	Konstantin Lisenkov; Russia	27.07	Bohdan Hrynenko; Ukraine	27.50
S9	Jose Antonio Mari Alcaraz; Spain	26.00	Leo Lahteenmaki; Finland	26.14	Alexander Skaliukh; Russia	26.39
S10	Dmitry Grigoryev; Russia	24.37 ER	Dmitry Bartasinskiy; Russia	24.96	David Levecq; Spain	25.04
S11	Alexander Chekurov; Russia	26.77	Viktor Smyrnov; Ukraine	27.30	Oleksandr Mashchenko; Ukraine	27.41
S12	Maksym Veraksa; Ukraine	23.53	Dzmitry Salei; Azerbaijan	24.02	Alexander Nevolin-Svetov; Russia	24.26
S13	Ihar Boki; Belarus	23.21 WR	Iaroslav Denysenko; Ukraine	24.00	Aleksandr Golintovskii; Russia	24.55

== Results ==
=== S1 ===
Final

Rank	Lane	Name	Nationality	Time	Notes
1st place, gold medalist(s)	5	Hennadii Boiko	Ukraine	1:09.84	
2nd place, silver medalist(s)	4	Itzhak Mamistvalov	Israel	1:13.13	
3rd place, bronze medalist(s)	6	Anton Kol	Ukraine	1:18.76	
4	3	Christos Tampaxis	Greece	1:23.11	
5	2	Oleksandr Golovko	Ukraine	1:33.06	
6	7	Andreas Katsaros	Greece	1:43.19	

=== S2 ===
Heat 1

Rank	Lane	Name	Nationality	Time	Notes
1	5	Dmitrii Kokarev	Russia	1:00.41	Q
2	6	Jacek Czech	Poland	1:02.05	Q
3	2	Serhii Palamarchuk	Ukraine	1:02.61	Q
4	3	Ievgen Panibratets	Ukraine	1:04.70	Q
5	7	Iad Josef Shalabi	Israel	1:06.68	Q
6	4	Aristeidis Makrodimitris	Greece	1:07.23	Q
7	1	Georgios Kapellakis	Greece	1:14.82	Q
8	8	Joao Pina	Portugal	1:20.87	Q
9	0	Ales Secnik	Slovenia	1:22.55	

Final

Rank	Lane	Name	Nationality	Time	Notes
1st place, gold medalist(s)	4	Dmitrii Kokarev	Russia	58.43	WR
2nd place, silver medalist(s)	3	Serhii Palamarchuk	Ukraine	1:00.50	
3rd place, bronze medalist(s)	5	Jacek Czech	Poland	1:02.22	
4	7	Aristeidis Makrodimitris	Greece	1:02.30	
5	6	Ievgen Panibratets	Ukraine	1:04.45	
6	2	Iad Josef Shalabi	Israel	1:08.32	
7	1	Georgios Kapellakis	Greece	1:10.01	
8	8	Joao Pina	Portugal	1:21.82	

=== S3 ===
Final

Rank	Lane	Name	Nationality	Time	Notes
1st place, gold medalist(s)	4	Dmytro Vynohradets	Ukraine	49.51	
2nd place, silver medalist(s)	5	Ioannis Kostakis	Greece	51.60	
3rd place, bronze medalist(s)	3	Miguel Angel Martinez	Spain	53.13	
4	6	Mikael Fredriksson	Sweden	57.23	
5	2	Pavlo Miasoiedov	Ukraine	1:03.51	
6	7	Alexander Makarov	Russia	1:08.61	

=== S4 ===
Heat 1

Rank	Lane	Name	Nationality	Time	Notes
1	4	David Smetanine	France	41.03	Q
2	5	Arnost Petracek	Czech Republic	41.25	Q
3	6	Richard Oribe	Spain	41.55	Q
4	2	Darko Duric	Slovenia	43.06	Q
5	1	Andrii Derevinskyi	Ukraine	43.79	Q
6	3	Michael Schoenmaker	Netherlands	44.00	Q
7	7	Aleksei Lyzhikhin	Russia	44.48	Q
8	8	Denys Rosolovych	Ukraine	45.74	Q
9	0	Nelson Lopes	Portugal	53.41	
10	9	Krzysztof Stefanowski	Poland	56.86	

Final

Rank	Lane	Name	Nationality	Time	Notes
1st place, gold medalist(s)	3	Richard Oribe	Spain	41.12	
2nd place, silver medalist(s)	5	Arnost Petracek	Czech Republic	41.47	
3rd place, bronze medalist(s)	2	Andrii Derevinskyi	Ukraine	41.90	
4	6	Darko Duric	Slovenia	42.12	
5	7	Michael Schoenmaker	Netherlands	42.34	
6	4	David Smetanine	France	43.61	
7	8	Denys Rosolovych	Ukraine	45.98	
8	1	Krzysztof Stefanowski	Poland	59.28	

=== S5 ===
Heat 1

Rank	Lane	Name	Nationality	Time	Notes
1	4	Sebastian Rodriguez	Spain	34.36	Q
2	5	Andrew Mullen	Great Britain	37.37	Q
3	3	Jordi Gordillo	Spain	37.45	Q
4	2	Kirill Popov	Russia	37.70	Q
5	6	James Scully	Ireland	38.43	Q
6	7	Jonas Larsen	Denmark	39.12	Q
7	1	Roman Zhdanov	Russia	42.80	Q
8	8	Tomi Brajsa	Croatia	47.65	Q
9	0	Ilias Arkoudeas	Greece	52.64	
10	9	Tomas Hlavinka	Czech Republic	57.61	

Final

Rank	Lane	Name	Nationality	Time	Notes
1st place, gold medalist(s)	4	Sebastian Rodriguez	Spain	34.09	
2nd place, silver medalist(s)	5	Andrew Mullen	Great Britain	36.12	
3rd place, bronze medalist(s)	6	Kirill Popov	Russia	36.50	
4	3	Jordi Gordillo	Spain	37.97	
5	7	Jonas Larsen	Denmark	38.52	
6	2	James Scully	Ireland	39.02	
7	1	Roman Zhdanov	Russia	42.14	
8	8	Tomi Brajsa	Croatia	47.61	

=== S6 ===
Heat 1

Rank	Lane	Name	Nationality	Time	Notes
1	5	Sascha Kindred	Great Britain	32.89	Q
2	6	Georgios Sfaltos	Greece	33.60	Q
3	3	Sergey Klyagin	Russia	33.90	Q
4	2	Iaroslav Semenenko	Ukraine	34.42	Q
5	4	Panagiotis Christakis	Greece	34.95	Q
6	7	Sebastian Iwanow	Germany	39.09	Q
7	9	Iurii Luchkin	Russia	39.58	Q
8	8	Viktor Kemeny	Slovakia	40.39	Q
9	1	Antun Brzak	Croatia	40.61	
10	0	Karl Forsman	Sweden	41.87	

Final

Rank	Lane	Name	Nationality	Time	Notes
1st place, gold medalist(s)	7	Sebastian Iwanow	Germany	31.77	
2nd place, silver medalist(s)	4	Sascha Kindred	Great Britain	32.46	
3rd place, bronze medalist(s)	2	Panagiotis Christakis	Greece	32.85	
4	3	Sergey Klyagin	Russia	33.50	
5	5	Georgios Sfaltos	Greece	33.65	
6	6	Iaroslav Semenenko	Ukraine	34.01	
7	1	Iurii Luchkin	Russia	39.65	
8	8	Viktor Kemeny	Slovakia	40.63	

=== S7 ===
Heats

Rank	Heat	Lane	Name	Nationality	Time	Notes
1	2	5	Sergey Sukharev	Russia	28.47	Q
2	1	4	Yevheniy Bohodayko	Ukraine	28.50	Q
3	2	4	Matthew Walker	Great Britain	28.60	Q
4	2	3	Andrey Gladkov	Russia	29.79	q
5	1	5	Tobias Pollap	Germany	30.06	Q
6	1	3	Valerio Taras	Italy	30.12	q
7	1	6	Nikolaos Tsotras	Greece	30.19	q
8	2	6	Mor Mesery	Israel	30.61	q
9	2	2	Oleksandr Komarov	Ukraine	30.95	
10	2	7	Charalampos Papaioannou	Greece	32.31	

Final

Rank	Lane	Name	Nationality	Time	Notes
1st place, gold medalist(s)	5	Yevheniy Bohodayko	Ukraine	27.93	
2nd place, silver medalist(s)	3	Matthew Walker	Great Britain	28.19	
3rd place, bronze medalist(s)	4	Sergey Sukharev	Russia	28.32	
4	6	Andrey Gladkov	Russia	29.35	
5	2	Tobias Pollap	Germany	29.52	
6	8	Mor Mesery	Israel	30.14	
7	1	Nikoloas Tsotras	Greece	30.40	
8	7	Valerio Taras	Italy	30.43	

=== S8 ===
Heat 1

Rank	Lane	Name	Nationality	Time	Notes
1	4	Denis Tarasov	Russia	26.90	Q
2	5	Konstantin Lisenkov	Russia	27.51	Q
3	3	Bohdan Hrynenko	Ukraine	27.79	Q
4	6	Iurii Bozhynskyi	Ukraine	28.59	Q
5	1	Ferenc Csuri	Hungary	28.73	Q
6	2	Josef Craig	Great Britain	28.82	Q
7	7	Niels Mortensen	Denmark	29.30	Q
8	8	Joshua Grob	Switzerland	29.87	Q
9	0	Ruben Linhares	Portugal	31.16	

Final

Rank	Lane	Name	Nationality	Time	Notes
1st place, gold medalist(s)	4	Denis Tarasov	Russia	25.32	WR
2nd place, silver medalist(s)	5	Konstantin Lisenkov	Russia	27.07	
3rd place, bronze medalist(s)	3	Bohdan Hrynenko	Ukraine	27.50	
4	6	Iurii Bozhynskyi	Ukraine	28.03	
5	7	Josef Craig	Great Britain	28.56	
6	2	Ferenc Csuri	Hungary	28.67	
7	1	Niels Mortensen	Denmark	29.20	
8	8	Joshua Grob	Switzerland	29.86	

=== S9 ===
Heats

Rank	Heat	Lane	Name	Nationality	Time	Notes
1	2	4	Jose Antonio Mari Alcaraz	Spain	26.33	Q
2	1	4	Leo Lahteenmaki	Finland	26.35	Q
3	2	5	Tamas Toth	Hungary	26.39	Q
4	1	5	Tamas Sors	Hungary	26.67	Q
5	2	3	Alexander Skaliukh	Russia	26.74	q
6	2	6	Csaba Meilinger	Hungary	27.07	q
7	1	3	David Grachat	Portugal	27.08	q
8	1	6	Matthew Wylie	Great Britain	27.09	q
9	2	2	Alexander Demyanenko	Russia	27.54	
10	2	7	Einar Niin	Estonia	27.96	
11	1	2	Kristijan Mamic	Croatia	28.13	
12	1	7	Nemanja Tadic	Serbia	31.49	

Final

Rank	Lane	Name	Nationality	Time	Notes
1st place, gold medalist(s)	4	Jose Antonio Mari Alcaraz	Spain	26.00	
2nd place, silver medalist(s)	5	Leo Lahteenmaki	Finland	26.14	
3rd place, bronze medalist(s)	2	Alexander Skaliukh	Russia	26.39	
4	3	Tamas Toth	Hungary	26.42	
5	6	Tamas Sors	Hungary	26.46	
6	1	David Grachat	Portugal	26.80	
7	7	Csaba Meilinger	Hungary	27.01	
8	8	Matthew Wylie	Great Britain	27.24	

=== S10 ===
Heat 1

Rank	Lane	Name	Nationality	Time	Notes
1	4	Dmitry Grigorev	Russia	24.95	Q
2	5	David Levecq	Spain	25.27	Q
3	6	Simone Ciulli	Italy	25.52	Q
4	3	Dmitry Bartasinskiy	Russia	26.02	Q
5	8	Artem Isaev	Russia	26.13	Q
6	7	Olivier van de Voort	Netherlands	26.14	Q
7	9	Kardo Ploomipuu	Estonia	26.27	Q
8	2	Robert Welbourn	Great Britain	26.41	Q
9	1	Rafal Kalinowski	Poland	26.60	
10	0	Patryk Karlinski	Poland	27.28	

Final

Rank	Lane	Name	Nationality	Time	Notes
1st place, gold medalist(s)	4	Dmitry Grigorev	Russia	24.37	ER
2nd place, silver medalist(s)	6	Dmitry Bartasinskiy	Russia	24.96	
3rd place, bronze medalist(s)	5	David Levecq	Spain	25.04	
4	3	Simone Ciulli	Italy	25.18	
5	8	Robert Welbourn	Great Britain	26.01	
6	2	Artem Isaev	Russia	26.04	
7	7	Olivier van de Voort	Netherlands	26.39	
8	1	Kardo Ploomipuu	Estonia	26.55	

=== S11 ===
Heat 1

Rank	Lane	Name	Nationality	Time	Notes
1	4	Alexander Chekurov	Russia	27.54	Q
2	3	Viktor Smyrnov	Ukraine	27.92	Q
3	6	Oleksandr Mashchenko	Ukraine	28.11	Q
4	2	Wojciech Makowski	Poland	28.25	Q
5	5	Dmytro Zalevskyy	Ukraine	28.70	Q
6	1	Maksim Koval	Russia	29.07	Q
7	7	Marcin Ryszka	Poland	30.32	Q
8	8	Mindaugas Dvylaitis	Lithuania	34.14	Q
9	9	Petr Kozyrev	Russia	36.42	
10	0	Amadeu Cruz	Portugal	37.44	

Final

Rank	Lane	Name	Nationality	Time	Notes
1st place, gold medalist(s)	4	Alexander Chekurov	Russia	26.77	
2nd place, silver medalist(s)	5	Viktor Smyrnov	Ukraine	27.30	
3rd place, bronze medalist(s)	3	Oleksandr Mashchenko	Ukraine	27.41	
4	6	Wojciech Makowski	Poland	28.12	
5	7	Maksim Koval	Russia	28.49	
6	2	Dmytro Zalevskyy	Ukraine	28.74	
7	1	Marcin Ryszka	Poland	30.74	
8	8	Mindaugas Dvylaitis	Lithuania	34.74	

=== S12 ===
Heats

Rank	Heat	Lane	Name	Nationality	Time	Notes
1	2	4	Maksym Veraksa	Ukraine	23.91	Q
2	1	5	Dzmitry Salei	Azerbaijan	24.16	Q
3	1	4	Aleksandr Nevolin-Svetov	Russia	24.24	Q
4	2	7	Sergii Klippert	Ukraine	24.72	Q
5	2	3	Omar Font	Spain	24.89	Q
6	2	6	Daniel Simon	Germany	25.10	q
7	2	5	Oleksii Fedyna	Ukraine	25.18	q
8	1	6	Charalampos Taiganidis	Greece	25.35	q
9	1	2	Uladzimir Izotau	Belarus	25.42	
10	1	7	Stepan Smagin	Russia	25.43	
11	2	2	Fabrizio Sottile	Italy	25.60	

Final

Rank	Lane	Name	Nationality	Time	Notes
1st place, gold medalist(s)	4	Maksym Veraksa	Ukraine	23.53	
2nd place, silver medalist(s)	5	Dzmitry Salei	Azerbaijan	24.02	
3rd place, bronze medalist(s)	3	Aleksandr Nevolin-Svetov	Russia	24.26	
4	6	Sergii Klippert	Ukraine	24.44	
5	1	Oleksii Fedyna	Ukraine	24.57	
6	2	Omar Font	Spain	24.71	
7	7	Daniel Simon	Germany	25.20	
8	8	Charalampos Taiganidis	Greece	25.34	

=== S13 ===
Final

Rank	Lane	Name	Nationality	Time	Notes
1st place, gold medalist(s)	5	Ihar Boki	Belarus	23.21	WR
2nd place, silver medalist(s)	4	Iaroslav Denysenko	Ukraine	24.00	
3rd place, bronze medalist(s)	3	Aleksandr Golintovskii	Russia	24.55	
4	6	Andrei Bukov	Russia	25.43	
5	2	Antti Antero Latikka	Finland	26.73	
6	7	Vitor Encarnacao	Portugal	27.56	

== See also ==
- List of IPC world records in swimming
