= Ukraine at the 2008 Summer Paralympics =

- IPC code: UKR
- NPC: National Sports Committee for the Disabled of Ukraine
- Website: www.paralympic.org.ua

in Beijing
- Competitors: 117 in 11 sports
- Flag bearer: Andrii Komar
- Medals Ranked 4th: Gold 24 Silver 18 Bronze 32 Total 74

Summer Paralympics appearances (overview)
- 1996; 2000; 2004; 2008; 2012; 2016; 2020; 2024

Other related appearances
- Soviet Union (1988); Unified Team (1992)

Ukraine sent a delegation to compete at the 2008 Summer Paralympics in Beijing.

Ukrainian athletes competed in athletics, judo, table tennis, wheelchair volleyball, swimming and weightlifting.

== Medallists ==
| Medal | Name | Sport | Event |
|---|---|---|---|
| Gold | Roman Pavlyk | Athletics | Men's 100m T36 |
| Gold | Roman Pavlyk | Athletics | Men's 400m T36 |
| Gold | Vasyl Lishchynskyi | Athletics | Men's discus throw F11-12 |
| Gold | Oxana Boturchuk | Athletics | Women's 100m T12 |
| Gold | Inna Dyachenko | Athletics | Women's 100m T38 |
| Gold | Inna Dyachenko | Athletics | Women's 200m T38 |
| Gold | Oksana Zubkovska | Athletics | Women's long jump F12 |
| Gold | Tetyana Yakybchuk | Athletics | Women's discus throw F32-34/51-53 |
| Gold | Alla Malchyk | Athletics | Women's shot put F35-36 |
| Gold | Volodymyr Antonyuk; Oleksandr Devlysh; Taras Dutko; Ihor Kosenko; Mykola Mikhovych; Denys Ponomaryov; Anataolii Shevchyk; Ivan Shkvarlo; Kostyantyn Symashko; Vitaliy Trushev; Andriy Tsukanov; Serhiy Vakulenko | Football 7-a-side | Men's team |
| Gold | Lidiya Solovyova | Powerlifting | Women's 40kg |
| Gold | Dmytro Vynohradets | Swimming | Men's 50m freestyle S3 |
| Gold | Dmytro Kryzhanovskyy | Swimming | Men's 50m freestyle S5 |
| Gold | Maksym Veraksa | Swimming | Men's 50m freestyle S12 |
| Gold | Oleksii Fedyna | Swimming | Men's 50m freestyle S13 |
| Gold | Maksym Veraksa | Swimming | Men's 100m freestyle S12 |
| Gold | Dmytro Vynohradets | Swimming | Men's 200m freestyle S3 |
| Gold | Andriy Kalyna | Swimming | Men's 100m breaststroke SB8 |
| Gold | Oleksandr Mashchenko | Swimming | Men's 100m breaststroke SB11 |
| Gold | Maksym Veraksa | Swimming | Men's 100m breaststroke SB12 |
| Gold | Oleksii Fedyna | Swimming | Men's 100m breaststroke SB13 |
| Gold | Maksym Veraksa | Swimming | Men's 200m individual medley SM12 |
| Gold | Oleksii Fedyna | Swimming | Men's 200m individual medley SM13 |
| Gold | Ganna Ielisavetska | Swimming | Women's 50m backstroke S2 |
| Silver | Roman Pavlyk | Athletics | Men's 200m T36 |
| Silver | Ivan Kytsenko | Athletics | Men's triple jump F12 |
| Silver | Mykola Zhabnyak | Athletics | Men's discus throw F37-38 |
| Silver | Viktoriya Kravchenko | Athletics | Women's 100m T37 |
| Silver | Oxana Boturchuk | Athletics | Women's 200m T12 |
| Silver | Viktoriya Kravchenko | Athletics | Women's 200m T37 |
| Silver | Oxana Boturchuk | Athletics | Women's 400m T12 |
| Silver | Oleksandr Petrenko | Rowing | Men's single sculls |
| Silver | Dmytro Vynohradets | Swimming | Men's 100m freestyle S3 |
| Silver | Dmytro Kryzhanovskyy | Swimming | Men's 100m freestyle S5 |
| Silver | Sergii Klippert | Swimming | Men's 100m freestyle S12 |
| Silver | Oleksii Fedyna | Swimming | Men's 100m freestyle S13 |
| Silver | Danylo Chufarov | Swimming | Men's 400m freestyle S13 |
| Silver | Sergii Klippert | Swimming | Men's 100m backstroke S12 |
| Silver | Oleksii Fedyna | Swimming | Men's 100m backstroke S13 |
| Silver | Oleksandr Mashchenko | Swimming | Men's 100m butterfly S11 |
| Silver | Andriy Kalyna | Swimming | Men's 200m individual medley SM9 |
| Silver | Iryna Sotska | Swimming | Women's 50m backstroke S2 |
| Bronze | Mykyta Senyk | Athletics | Men's 100m T38 |
| Bronze | Mykyta Senyk | Athletics | Men's 200m T38 |
| Bronze | Oleksandr Ivaniukhin | Athletics | Men's 400m T11 |
| Bronze | Andriy Onufriyenko | Athletics | Men's 400m T38 |
| Bronze | Oleksandr Iasynovyi | Athletics | Men's discus throw F11-12 |
| Bronze | Vasyl Lishchynskyi | Athletics | Men's shot put F11-12 |
| Bronze | Svitlana Gorbenko | Athletics | Women's long jump F13 |
| Bronze | Alla Malchyk | Athletics | Women's discus throw F35-36 |
| Bronze | Sergiy Sydorenko | Judo | Men's 73kg |
| Bronze | Mykola Lyivytskyi | Judo | Men's 100kg |
| Bronze | Sergii Klippert | Swimming | Men's 50m freestyle S12 |
| Bronze | Danylo Chufarov | Swimming | Men's 100m freestyle S13 |
| Bronze | Sergii Klippert | Swimming | Men's 400m freestyle S12 |
| Bronze | Dmytro Vynohradets | Swimming | Men's 50m backstroke S3 |
| Bronze | Viktor Smyrnov | Swimming | Men's 100m backstroke S11 |
| Bronze | Maksym Veraksa | Swimming | Men's 100m backstroke S12 |
| Bronze | Dmytro Aleksyeyev | Swimming | Men's 100m backstroke S13 |
| Bronze | Viktor Smyrnov | Swimming | Men's 100m breaststroke SB11 |
| Bronze | Sergii Klippert | Swimming | Men's 100m breaststroke SB12 |
| Bronze | Viktor Smyrnov | Swimming | Men's 100m butterfly S11 |
| Bronze | Anton Stabrovskyy | Swimming | Men's 100m butterfly S12 |
| Bronze | Sergii Klippert | Swimming | Men's 200m individual medley SM12 |
| Bronze | Dmytro Aleksyeyev | Swimming | Men's 200m individual medley SM13 |
| Bronze | Andriy Kalyna; Ievgen Poltavskyi; Andriy Sirovatchenko; Taras Yastremskyy | Swimming | Men's 4x100m medley relay 34pts |
| Bronze | Olena Akopyan | Swimming | Women's 50m freestyle S5 |
| Bronze | Iryna Balashova | Swimming | Women's 50m freestyle S13 |
| Bronze | Olena Akopyan | Swimming | Women's 200m freestyle S5 |
| Bronze | Yaryna Matlo | Swimming | Women's 100m breaststroke SB12 |
| Bronze | Olena Akopyan | Swimming | Women's 50m butterfly S6 |
| Bronze | Yuliya Volkova | Swimming | Women's 100m butterfly S12 |
| Bronze | Serhiy Shenkevych | Wheelchair fencing | Men's épée B |
| Bronze | Serhiy Shenkevych | Wheelchair fencing | Men's sabre B |

== Sports ==
=== Archery ===
==== Men ====
| Athlete | Event | Ranking round | | Round of 32 | Round of 16 | Quarterfinals | Semifinals | Finals | |
| Athlete | Event | Score | Seed | Opposition score | Opposition score | Opposition score | Opposition score | Opposition score | Rank |
|---|---|---|---|---|---|---|---|---|---|
| Pavlo Nazar | Men's individual compound W1 | 676 | 8 | Bye | Evans (CAN); L 110-109 | did not advance | | | |
| Taras Chopyk | Men's individual recurve W1/W2 | 636 | 1 | Bye | Ozen (TUR); L 100-107 | did not advance | | | |
| Serhiy Atamanenko | Men's individual recurve standing | 510 | 23 | Lyocsa (SVK); L 73-95 | did not advance | | | | |
| Yuriy Kopiy | Men's individual recurve standing | 576 | 18 | Yoon Y B (KOR); W 102-91 | Chen Y (CHN); L 94-100 | did not advance | | | |
| Serhiy Atamanenko; Taras Chopyk; Yuriy Kopiy | Men's team recurve | 1722 | 8 | — | Slovakia (SVK); W 185-181 | South Korea (KOR); L 187-188 | did not advance | | |

==== Women ====
| Athlete | Event | Ranking round | | Round of 32 | Round of 16 | Quarterfinals | Semifinals | Finals | |
| Athlete | Event | Score | Seed | Opposition score | Opposition score | Opposition score | Opposition score | Opposition score | Rank |
|---|---|---|---|---|---|---|---|---|---|
| Roksolana Dzoba | Women's individual recurve W1/W2 | 519 | 12 | Bye | Volynets (UKR); W 87-83 | Girismen (TUR); L 83-99 | did not advance | | |
| Larysa Mikhnyeva | Women's individual recurve W1/W2 | 451 | 18 | Critchlow-Smith (GBR); L 70-83 | did not advance | | | | |
| Iryna Volynets | Women's individual recurve W1/W2 | 562 | 5 | Bye | Dzoba (UKR); L 83-87 | did not advance | | | |
| Bohdana Nikitenko | Women's individual recurve standing | 536 | 14 | Wolak (POL); W 82-79 | Duboc (FRA); L 78-99 | did not advance | | | |
| Roksolana Dzoba; Bohdana Nikitenko; Iryna Volynets | Women's team recurve | 1617 | 4 | — | | Poland (POL); L 162-166 | did not advance | | |

=== Athletics ===
==== Men's track ====
| Athlete | Class | Event | Heats | | Semifinal | | Final | |
| Athlete | Class | Event | Result | Rank | Result | Rank | Result | Rank |
|---|---|---|---|---|---|---|---|---|
| Oleksandr Ivaniukhin | T11 | 200m | 23.53 | 5 Q | 23.27 | 5 q | 27.93 | 8 |
| Oleksandr Ivaniukhin | T11 | 400m | 52.70 | 3 Q | 50.79 | 1 Q | 50.82 | 3rd place, bronze medalist(s) |
| Sergii Kravchenko | T37 | 100m | 12.57 | 9 | did not advance | | | |
| Oleh Leshchyshyn | T46 | 800m | 2:01.58 | 16 | did not advance | | | |
| Oleh Leshchyshyn | T46 | 1500m | 4:11.35 | 12 | — | | 4:17.96 | 11 |
| Andriy Onufriyenko | T38 | 100m | — | | | | 11.70 | 6 |
| Andriy Onufriyenko | T38 | 200m | 24.94 | 11 | did not advance | | | |
| Andriy Onufriyenko | T38 | 400m | — | | | | 52.45 | 3rd place, bronze medalist(s) |
| Roman Pavlyk | T36 | 100m | — | | | | 12.25 PR | 1st place, gold medalist(s) |
| Roman Pavlyk | T36 | 200m | — | | | | 25.05 | 2nd place, silver medalist(s) |
| Roman Pavlyk | T36 | 400m | — | | | | 54.13 WR | 1st place, gold medalist(s) |
| Serhiy Sakovskyy | T36 | 400m | — | | | | 59.00 | 7 |
| Serhiy Sakovskyy | T36 | 800m | — | | | | 2:15.84 | 5 |
| Mykyta Senyk | T38 | 100m | — | | | | 11.18 | 3rd place, bronze medalist(s) |
| Mykyta Senyk | T38 | 200m | 22.99 | 2 Q | — | | 22.52 | 3rd place, bronze medalist(s) |
| Sergii Slynko | T35 | 100m | — | | | | 12.83 | 4 |

==== Men's field ====
| Athlete | Class | Event | Final | | |
| Athlete | Class | Event | Result | Points | Rank |
|---|---|---|---|---|---|
| Oleksandr Iasynovyi | F11-12 | Discus throw | 49.52 | 974 | 3rd place, bronze medalist(s) |
| Ruslan Katyshev | F12 | Long jump | 6.38 | - | 8 |
| Ruslan Katyshev | P12 | Pentathlon | 3027 | | 7 |
| Ivan Kytsenko | F12 | Triple jump | 15.24 | - | 2nd place, silver medalist(s) |
| Vasyl Lishchynskyi | F11-12 | Discus throw | 40.59 | 991 | 1st place, gold medalist(s) |
| Vasyl Lishchynskyi | F11-12 | Shot put | 13.59 | 984 | 3rd place, bronze medalist(s) |
| Volodymyr Piddubnyy | F11-12 | Discus throw | 33.01 | 806 | 9 |
| Maksym Solyankin | F42/44 | Javelin throw | 49.30 | 905 | 9 |
| Maksym Solyankin | F44 | Discus throw | 35.60 | 659 | 11 |
| Mykola Zhabnyak | F37-38 | Discus throw | 52.00 WR | 1010 | 2nd place, silver medalist(s) |
| Mykola Zhabnyak | F37-38 | Javelin throw | 44.57 SB | 926 | 8 |
| Mykola Zhabnyak | F37-38 | Shot put | 12.73 | 846 | 7 |

==== Women's track ====
| Athlete | Class | Event | Heats | | Semifinal | | Final | |
| Athlete | Class | Event | Result | Rank | Result | Rank | Result | Rank |
|---|---|---|---|---|---|---|---|---|
| Oxana Boturchuk | T12 | 100m | 12.42 | 1 Q | 12.43 | 1 Q | 12.38 | 1st place, gold medalist(s) |
| Oxana Boturchuk | T12 | 200m | 25.30 | 1 Q | 25.34 | 2 Q | 25.03 | 2nd place, silver medalist(s) |
| Oxana Boturchuk | T12 | 400m | 56.05 | 2 Q | — | | 55.88 | 2nd place, silver medalist(s) |
| Maryna Chyshko | T13 | 100m | 12.72 | 5 Q | — | | 12.58 | 5 |
| Maryna Chyshko | T13 | 200m | 26.57 | 6 Q | — | | 26.50 | 6 |
| Inna Dyachenko | T38 | 100m | 13.56 WR | 1 Q | — | | 13.43 WR | 1st place, gold medalist(s) |
| Inna Dyachenko | T38 | 200m | 27.93 WR | 1 Q | — | | 27.81 WR | 1st place, gold medalist(s) |
| Yuliya Korunchak | T13 | 100m | 13.58 | 12 | did not advance | | | |
| Viktoriya Kravchenko | T37 | 100m | 14.41 | 4 Q | — | | 14.21 | 2nd place, silver medalist(s) |
| Viktoriya Kravchenko | T37 | 200m | 30.01 | 3 Q | — | | 29.60 | 2nd place, silver medalist(s) |
| Oksana Krechunyak | T37 | 100m | 14.85 | 5 Q | — | | 15.09 | 6 |
| Oksana Krechunyak | T37 | 200m | 31.16 | 5 Q | — | | 31.17 | 6 |
| Tetyana Rudkivs'ka | T46 | 100m | 12.83 | 6 q | — | | 12.85 | 7 |
| Tetyana Rudkivs'ka | T46 | 200m | 26.43 | 5 Q | — | | 26.05 | 4 |
| Tetiana Smyrnova | T13 | 100m | 13.16 | 10 | did not advance | | | |
| Tetiana Smyrnova | T13 | 200m | 26.65 | 7 q | — | | 26.93 | 8 |
| Tetiana Smyrnova | T13 | 400m | 58.66 | 5 Q | — | | 1:00.06 | 5 |

==== Women's field ====
| Athlete | Class | Event | Final | | |
| Athlete | Class | Event | Result | Points | Rank |
|---|---|---|---|---|---|
| Oxana Boturchuk | F12 | Long jump | 5.28 | - | 8 |
| Maryna Chyshko | F13 | Long jump | 4.09 | - | 13 |
| Svitlana Gorbenko | F13 | Long jump | 5.62 | - | 3rd place, bronze medalist(s) |
| Yuliya Korunchak | F13 | Long jump | 5.04 | - | 8 |
| Alla Malchyk | F35-36 | Discus throw | 22.15 | 1029 | 3rd place, bronze medalist(s) |
| Alla Malchyk | F35-36 | Shot put | 9.33 | 1048 | 1st place, gold medalist(s) |
| Tetyana Yakybchuk | F32-34/51-53 | Discus throw | 17.05 | 1129 | 1st place, gold medalist(s) |
| Tetyana Yakybchuk | F32-34/51-53 | Shot put | 6.48 | 1020 | 4 |
| Viktoriya Yasevych | F35-38 | Javelin throw | 22.55 | 949 | 11 |
| Viktoriya Yasevych | F37-38 | Discus throw | 22.86 | 778 | 12 |
| Oksana Zubkovska | F12 | Long jump | 6.28 WR | - | 1st place, gold medalist(s) |

=== Football 7-a-side ===
The men's football 7-a-side team won the gold medal after defeating Russia in the gold medal match.

==== Players ====
- Volodymyr Antonyuk
- Oleksandr Devlysh
- Taras Dutko
- Ihor Kosenko
- Mykola Mikhovych
- Denys Ponomaryov
- Anatolii Shevchyk
- Ivan Shkvarlo
- Kostyantyn Symashko
- Vitaliy Trushev
- Andriy Tsukanov
- Serhiy Vakulenko

==== Tournament ====
8 September 2008
15:45

| Ukraine | 8 - 1 | Great Britain |

Olympic Green Hockey Field
Attendance: 5,141
Referee: Kou Yadong (CHN)
10 September 2008
11:15

| Ireland | 0 - 7 | Ukraine |

Olympic Green Hockey Field
Attendance: 6,763
12 September 2008
13:30

| Ukraine | 4 - 0 | Iran |

Olympic Green Hockey Field

Semifinals

14 September 2008
14:00

| Brazil | 0 - 6 | Ukraine |

Olympic Green Hockey Field

Gold medal match

16 September 2008
16:30

| Ukraine | 2 - 1 (a.e.t) | Russia |

Olympic Green Hockey Field
Attendance: 11,267
Referee: Guido Gonzalez (ECU)

=== Judo ===
==== Men ====
| Athlete | Event | First round | Quarterfinals | Semifinals | Repechage round 1 | Repechage round 2 | Final/ Bronze medal contest |
| Athlete | Event | Opposition Result | Opposition Result | Opposition Result | Opposition Result | Opposition Result | Opposition Result |
|---|---|---|---|---|---|---|---|
| Sergii Karpeniuk | Men's 66kg | Bye | Golmohammadi (IRI); W 0010-0003 | — | Garcia del Valle (ESP); KG | Alishov (AZE); W 0101-0000 | V Sanchez (CUB); L 0000-0120 |
| Mykola Lyivytskyi | Men's 100kg | Morgan (CAN); W 0200-0000 | Bye | Tenorio Silva (BRA); L 0000-1011 | — | | Hirose (JPN); W 0100-0001 (bronze) |
| Oleksandr Pominov | Men's 81kg | Carvallo (VEN); L 0000-0210 | — | | Ardit (ITA); W 1000-0000 | Mirhassan Nattaj (IRI); L 0001-0101 | Did not advance |
| Sergiy Sydorenko | Men's 73kg | Bye | Krieger (GER); W 0013-0000 | Xu Z (CHN); L 0000-0020 | — | | Hierrezuelo (CUB); H (bronze) |

==== Women ====
| Athlete | Event | First round | Quarterfinals | Semifinals | Repechage round 1 | Repechage round 2 | Final/ Bronze medal contest |
| Athlete | Event | Opposition Result | Opposition Result | Opposition Result | Opposition Result | Opposition Result | Opposition Result |
|---|---|---|---|---|---|---|---|
| Yuliya Halinska | Women's 48kg | Bye | Cardoso (BRA); L 0000–0200 | — | Bye | Medjeded (FRA); W 1010-0010 | Potapova (RUS); L 0010-0201 |

=== Powerlifting ===
==== Men ====
| Athlete | Event | Result | Rank |
|---|---|---|---|
| Andriy Hurnakov | 56kg | 140.0 | 12 |

==== Women ====
| Athlete | Event | Result | Rank |
|---|---|---|---|
| Tetyana Frolova | +82.5kg | 120.0 | 5 |
| Svitlana Hedian | 67.5kg | 95.0 | 6 |
| Tetyana Shyrokolava | 56kg | 92.5 | 4 |
| Lidiya Solovyova | 40kg | 105.5 WR | 1st place, gold medalist(s) |
| Rayisa Toporkova | 44kg | 85.0 | 4 |
| Olena Voitko | 52kg | 87.5 | 5 |

=== Rowing ===
==== Men ====
| Athlete | Event | Heats | | Repechage | | Final | |
| Athlete | Event | Time | Rank | Time | Rank | Time | Rank |
|---|---|---|---|---|---|---|---|
| Oleksandr Petrenko | Men's single sculls | 5:17.36 | 2 Q FA | — | | 5:26.03 | 2nd place, silver medalist(s) |
| Svitlana Kupriianova | Women's single sculls | 6:13.49 | 7 R | 6:28.44 | 2 FA | 6:40.04 | 4 |
| Sergii Dereza; Iryna Kyrychenko | Mixed doubles sculls | 4:27.50 | 6 R | 4:38.90 | 5 FB | 4:37.78 | 2 |

=== Shooting ===
==== Men ====
| Athlete | Event | Qualification | | Final | | |
| Athlete | Event | Score | Rank | Score | Total | Rank |
|---|---|---|---|---|---|---|
| Mykola Ovcharenko | Men's 50m rifle 3 positions SH1 | 1110 | 20 | did not advance | | |
| Mykola Ovcharenko | Mixed 10m air rifle prone SH1 | 587 | 43 | did not advance | | |
| Mykola Ovcharenko | Mixed 50m rifle prone SH1 | 577 | 32 | did not advance | | |
| Iurii Samoshkin | Men's 10m air rifle standing SH1 | 570 | 23 | did not advance | | |
| Iurii Samoshkin | Men's 50m rifle 3 positions SH1 | 1090 | 25 | did not advance | | |
| Iurii Samoshkin | Mixed 10 air rifle prone SH1 | 588 | 40 | did not advance | | |
| Iurii Samoshkin | Mixed 50m rifle prone SH1 | 549 | 42 | did not advance | | |
| Yuriy Stoyev | Men's 10m air rifle standing SH1 | 580 | 15 | did not advance | | |
| Yuriy Stoyev | Men's 50m rifle 3 positions SH1 | 1105 | 22 | did not advance | | |
| Yuriy Stoyev | Mixed 10m air rifle prone SH1 | 593 | 36 | did not advance | | |
| Yuriy Stoyev | Mixed 50m rifle prone SH1 | 584 | 13 | did not advance | | |

==== Women ====
| Athlete | Event | Qualification | | Final | | |
| Athlete | Event | Score | Rank | Score | Total | Rank |
|---|---|---|---|---|---|---|
| Tetiana Podziuban | Women's 10m air pistol SH1 | 354 | 13 | did not advance | | |
| Tetiana Podziuban | Mixed 50m pistol SH1 | 470 | 30 | did not advance | | |

=== Swimming ===
==== Men ====
| Athlete | Class | Event | Heats | | Final | |
| Athlete | Class | Event | Result | Rank | Result | Rank |
|---|---|---|---|---|---|---|
| Dmytro Aleksyeyev | S13 | 100m backstroke | 1:03.67 | 2 Q | 1:03.40 | 3rd place, bronze medalist(s) |
| Dmytro Aleksyeyev | S13 | 100m butterfly | 1:02.67 | 8 Q | 1:03.32 | 8 |
| Dmytro Aleksyeyev | S13 | 50m freestyle | 25.13 | 5 Q | 25.13 | 6 |
| Dmytro Aleksyeyev | S13 | 100m freestyle | 55.88 | 9 | did not advance | |
| Dmytro Aleksyeyev | SM13 | 200m individual medley | 2:20.39 | 4 Q | 2:17.13 | 3rd place, bronze medalist(s) |
| Iurii Andriushin | S7 | 50m butterfly | 33.99 | 8 Q | 34.07 | 6 |
| Iurii Andriushin | S7 | 50m freestyle | 31.17 | 5 Q | 31.12 | 6 |
| Iurii Andriushin | S7 | 100m freestyle | 1:08.52 | 6 Q | 1:08.79 | 7 |
| Danylo Chufarov | S13 | 100m butterfly | 1:02.65 | 6 Q | 1:00.95 | 4 |
| Danylo Chufarov | S13 | 50m freestyle | 25.34 | 9 | did not advance | |
| Danylo Chufarov | S13 | 100m freestyle | 55.14 | 6 Q | 54.26 | 3rd place, bronze medalist(s) |
| Danylo Chufarov | S13 | 400m freestyle | 4:25.48 | 2 Q | 4:14.84 | 2nd place, silver medalist(s) |
| Danylo Chufarov | SM13 | 200m individual medley | 2:23.28 | 5 Q | 2:18.07 | 4 |
| Sergiy Demchuk | S12 | 50m freestyle | 27.31 | 10 | did not advance | |
| Sergiy Demchuk | S12 | 100m butterfly | 1:02.24 | 5 Q | 1:02.29 | 6 |
| Sergiy Demchuk | S12 | 100m freestyle | 1:03.02 | 14 | did not advance | |
| Oleksii Fedyna | S13 | 100m backstroke | 1:05.05 | 4 Q | 1:02.93 | 2nd place, silver medalist(s) |
| Oleksii Fedyna | S13 | 100m butterfly | 1:01.54 | 4 Q | 1:01.54 | 5 |
| Oleksii Fedyna | S13 | 50m freestyle | 24.72 | 2 Q | 23.75 WR | 1st place, gold medalist(s) |
| Oleksii Fedyna | S13 | 100m freestyle | 54.86 WR | 1 Q | 54.11 | 2nd place, silver medalist(s) |
| Oleksii Fedyna | S13 | 400m freestyle | 4:30.48 | 5 Q | 4:27.66 | 6 |
| Oleksii Fedyna | SB13 | 100m breaststroke | 1:09.59 | 2 Q | 1:04.63 WR | 1st place, gold medalist(s) |
| Oleksii Fedyna | SM13 | 200m individual medley | 2:16.32 WR | 1 Q | 2:13.84 WR | 1st place, gold medalist(s) |
| Denys Graniuk | S10 | 100m backstroke | 1:06.02 | 12 | did not advance | |
| Denys Graniuk | S10 | 100m butterfly | 1:05.86 | 13 | did not advance | |
| Denys Graniuk | S10 | 100m freestyle | 59.34 | 18 | did not advance | |
| Maksym Isayev | S10 | 100m backstroke | 1:05.82 | 11 | did not advance | |
| Maksym Isayev | S10 | 50m freestyle | 26.71 | 14 | did not advance | |
| Maksym Isayev | S10 | 100m freestyle | 58.39 | 16 | did not advance | |
| Andriy Kalyna | S9 | 100m butterfly | 1:03.09 | 6 Q | 1:02.00 | 5 |
| Andriy Kalyna | S9 | 50m freestyle | 26.30 | 5 Q | 26.46 | 6 |
| Andriy Kalyna | S9 | 100m freestyle | 57.35 | 3 Q | 57.12 | 4 |
| Andriy Kalyna | SB8 | 100m breaststroke | 1:12.86 | 1 Q | 1:07.01 | 1st place, gold medalist(s) |
| Andriy Kalyna | SM9 | 200m individual medley | 2:20.46 PR | 1 Q | 2:17.21 | 2nd place, silver medalist(s) |
| Sergii Klippert | S12 | 100m backstroke | 1:02.24 | 2 Q | 1:00.31 | 2nd place, silver medalist(s) |
| Sergii Klippert | S12 | 100m butterfly | 1:02.45 | 6 Q | 1:00.72 | 4 |
| Sergii Klippert | S12 | 50m freestyle | 24.95 | 2 Q | 24.98 | 3rd place, bronze medalist(s) |
| Sergii Klippert | S12 | 100m freestyle | 54.40 | 2 Q | 53.81 | 2nd place, silver medalist(s) |
| Sergii Klippert | S12 | 400m freestyle | 4:32.24 | 5 Q | 4:19.46 | 3rd place, bronze medalist(s) |
| Sergii Klippert | SB12 | 100m breaststroke | 1:12.65 | 3 Q | 1:09.83 | 3rd place, bronze medalist(s) |
| Sergii Klippert | SM12 | 200m individual medley | 2:19.84 | 4 Q | 2:14.05 | 3rd place, bronze medalist(s) |
| Dmytro Kryzhanovskyy | S5 | 50m freestyle | 33.85 | 1 Q | 33.00 | 1st place, gold medalist(s) |
| Dmytro Kryzhanovskyy | S5 | 100m freestyle | 1:14.45 | 2 Q | 1:12.73 | 2nd place, silver medalist(s) |
| Oleksandr Mashchenko | S11 | 100m backstroke | 1:15.19 | 6 Q | 1:15.07 | 6 |
| Oleksandr Mashchenko | S11 | 100m butterfly | 1:06.08 | 3 Q | 1:04.08 | 2nd place, silver medalist(s) |
| Oleksandr Mashchenko | S11 | 50m freestyle | 28.20 | 8 Q | 28.44 | 8 |
| Oleksandr Mashchenko | SB11 | 100m breaststroke | 1:16.59 | 2 Q | 1:12.36 | 1st place, gold medalist(s) |
| Oleksandr Myroshnychenko | S11 | 100m backstroke | 1:19.10 | 10 | did not advance | |
| Oleksandr Myroshnychenko | S11 | 400m freestyle | 5:10.05 | 6 Q | 5:05.00 | 6 |
| Ievgen Poltavskyi | S8 | 100m backstroke | 1:13.40 | 5 Q | 1:13.40 | 6 |
| Ievgen Poltavskyi | S8 | 100m freestyle | 1:11.78 | 16 | did not advance | |
| Iaroslav Semenenko | S6 | 100m backstroke | 1:25.55 | 6 Q | 1:23.13 | 5 |
| Iaroslav Semenenko | S6 | 50m butterfly | 37.08 | 10 | did not advance | |
| Iaroslav Semenenko | SB7 | 100m breaststroke | 1:29.22 | 9 | did not advance | |
| Andriy Sirovatchenko | S9 | 100m backstroke | 1:08.13 | 5 Q | 1:06.83 | 6 |
| Andriy Sirovatchenko | S9 | 100m butterfly | 1:04.00 | 9 | did not advance | |
| Andriy Sirovatchenko | S9 | 50m freestyle | 27.27 | 15 | did not advance | |
| Andriy Sirovatchenko | S9 | 100m freestyle | 1:00.18 | 20 | did not advance | |
| Viktor Smyrnov | S11 | 100m backstroke | 1:11.53 | 3 Q | 1:09.41 | 3rd place, bronze medalist(s) |
| Viktor Smyrnov | S11 | 100m butterfly | 1:08.28 | 5 Q | 1:05.79 | 3rd place, bronze medalist(s) |
| Viktor Smyrnov | S11 | 50m freestyle | 28.13 | 5 Q | 27.74 | 5 |
| Viktor Smyrnov | S11 | 100m freestyle | 1:03.01 | 5 Q | DSQ | |
| Viktor Smyrnov | S11 | 400m freestyle | 4:57.43 | 3 Q | 4:52.32 | 4 |
| Viktor Smyrnov | SB11 | 100m breaststroke | 1:18.24 | 5 Q | 1:14.70 | 3rd place, bronze medalist(s) |
| Anton Stabrovskyy | S12 | 100m butterfly | 1:01.02 | 3 Q | 1:00.50 | 3rd place, bronze medalist(s) |
| Anton Stabrovskyy | S12 | 400m freestyle | 5:00.76 | 9 | did not advance | |
| Anton Stabrovskyy | SM12 | 200m individual medley | 2:32.94 | 10 | did not advance | |
| Oleg Tkalienko | SB13 | 100m breaststroke | 1:13.91 | 9 | did not advance | |
| Maksym Veraksa | S12 | 100m backstroke | 1:04.19 | 5 Q | 1:02.08 | 3rd place, bronze medalist(s) |
| Maksym Veraksa | S12 | 50m freestyle | 24.05 | 1 Q | 23.43 WR | 1st place, gold medalist(s) |
| Maksym Veraksa | S12 | 100m freestyle | 54.32 PR | 1 Q | 51.93 WR | 1st place, gold medalist(s) |
| Maksym Veraksa | SB12 | 100m breaststroke | 1:08.55 WR | 1 Q | 1:07.46 WR | 1st place, gold medalist(s) |
| Maksym Veraksa | SM12 | 200m individual medley | 2:15.44 | 1 Q | 2:12.71 WR | 1st place, gold medalist(s) |
| Dmytro Vynohradets | S3 | 50m backstroke | 52.96 | 3 Q | 53.37 | 3rd place, bronze medalist(s) |
| Dmytro Vynohradets | S3 | 50m freestyle | 53.71 | 5 Q | 42.60 WR | 1st place, gold medalist(s) |
| Dmytro Vynohradets | S3 | 100m freestyle | 1:54.60 | 4 Q | 1:35.65 | 2nd place, silver medalist(s) |
| Dmytro Vynohradets | S3 | 200m freestyle | — | | 3:22.98 WR | 1st place, gold medalist(s) |
| Taras Yastremskyy | S9 | 50m freestyle | 27.83 | 17 | did not advance | |
| Taras Yastremskyy | S9 | 100m freestyle | 59.37 | 16 | did not advance | |
| Taras Yastremskyy | S9 | 400m freestyle | 4:36.97 | 11 | did not advance | |
| Maksym Zavodnyy | SB13 | 100m breaststroke | 1:09.53 | 1 Q | 1:09.22 | 5 |
| Denys Zhumela | S2 | 50m backstroke | 1:14.85 | 7 Q | 1:15.40 | 7 |
| Denys Zhumela | S2 | 50m freestyle | 1:13.59 | 4 Q | 1:12.04 | 5 |
| Denys Zhumela | S2 | 100m freestyle | 2:34.40 | 4 Q | 2:35.90 | 7 |
| Denys Zhumela | S2 | 200m freestyle | 5:25.96 | 6 Q | 5:16.30 | 4 |
| Iurii Andriushin; Iarolsav Semenenko; Dmytro Kryzhanovskyy; Dmytro Vynohradets | - | Men's 4x50m medley relay | 2:51.26 | 2 Q | 2:45.44 | 5 |
| Andriy Kalyna; Ievgen Poltavskyi; Andriy Sirovatchenko; Taras Yastremskyy | - | Men's 4x100m medley relay | 4:26.59 | 1 Q | 4:19.89 | 3rd place, bronze medalist(s) |

==== Women ====
| Athlete | Class | Event | Heats | | Final | |
| Athlete | Class | Event | Result | Rank | Result | Rank |
|---|---|---|---|---|---|---|
| Olena Akopyan | S5 | 50m freestyle | 37.90 | 3 Q | 37.53 | 3rd place, bronze medalist(s) |
| Olena Akopyan | S5 | 100m freestyle | 1:21.43 | 1 Q | 1:22.84 | 4 |
| Olena Akopyan | S5 | 200m freestyle | 2:54.20 | 2 Q | 2:52.51 | 3rd place, bronze medalist(s) |
| Olena Akopyan | S6 | 50m butterfly | 40.51 | 2 Q | 40.72 | 3rd place, bronze medalist(s) |
| Iryna Balashova | S13 | 100m backstroke | 1:12.64 | 2 Q | 1:12.65 | 5 |
| Iryna Balashova | S13 | 50m freestyle | — | | 28.04 | 3rd place, bronze medalist(s) |
| Iryna Balashova | S13 | 100m freestyle | 1:02.37 | 4 Q | 1:01.56 | 5 |
| Kateryna Demyanenko | SB5 | 100m breaststroke | 2:07.10 | 10 | did not advance | |
| Ganna Ielisavetska | S2 | 50m backstroke | 1:18.01 | 2 Q | 1:13.64 WR | 1st place, gold medalist(s) |
| Yaryna Matlo | S12 | 100m butterfly | 1:18.25 | 8 Q | 1:17.28 | 8 |
| Yaryna Matlo | SB12 | 100m breaststroke | 1:23.15 | 6 Q | 1:19.53 | 3rd place, bronze medalist(s) |
| Yaryna Matlo | SM12 | 200m individual medley | 2:51.95 | 9 | did not advance | |
| Nataliia Semenova | S2 | 50m backstroke | 1:23.69 | 5 Q | 1:23.85 | 4 |
| Iryna Sotska | S2 | 50m backstroke | 1:17.31 WR | 1 Q | 1:15.53 | 2nd place, silver medalist(s) |
| Yuliya Volkova | S12 | 50m freestyle | 29.07 | 4 Q | 28.86 | 6 |
| Yuliya Volkova | S12 | 100m butterfly | 1:16.06 | 6 Q | 1:10.89 | 3rd place, bronze medalist(s) |
| Yuliya Volkova | S12 | 100m freestyle | 1:02.90 | 2 Q | 1:02.53 | 6 |
| Yuliya Volkova | SB12 | 100m breaststroke | 1:22.87 | 5 Q | 1:19.67 | 4 |
| Yuliya Volkova | SM12 | 200m individual medley | 2:44.29 | 6 Q | 2:37.42 | 5 |

=== Table tennis ===
==== Men ====
| Athlete | Event | Preliminaries | | | | Round of 16 | Quarterfinals | Semifinals | Final / BM | |
| Athlete | Event | Opposition Result | Opposition Result | Opposition Result | Rank | Opposition Result | Opposition Result | Opposition Result | Opposition Result | Rank |
|---|---|---|---|---|---|---|---|---|---|---|
| Mykhaylo Popov | Men's singles C7 | Wollmert (GER); L 0–3 | Bayley (GBR); W 3–2 | Shur (ISR); W 2–0 | 2 | did not advance | | | | |
| Vadym Kubov | Men's singles C9-10 | Ma L (CHN); L 0-3 | Altaraz (ISR); W 3-2 | — | 2 | did not advance | | | | |
| Yuriy Shchepanskyy | Men's singles C9-10 | Olufemi (NGR); L 0-3 | Lu X (CHN); W 3-1 | — | 2 | did not advance | | | | |
| Vadym Kubov; Yuriy Shchepanskyy | Men's team C9-10 | No preliminaries | | | | United States (USA); W 3-2 | Czech Republic (CZE); L 1-3 | did not advance | | |

==== Women ====
| Athlete | Event | Preliminaries | | | Round of 16 | Quarterfinals | Semifinals | Final / BM | |
| Athlete | Event | Opposition Result | Opposition Result | Rank | Opposition Result | Opposition Result | Opposition Result | Opposition Result | Rank |
|---|---|---|---|---|---|---|---|---|---|
| Antonina Khodzynska | Women's singles C6-7 | Martyasheva (RUS); L 1-3 | Barneoud (FRA); W 3-0 | 2 | did not advance | | | | |
| Yuliya Klymenko | Women's singles C6-7 | Mahmoud Afify (EGY); L 2-3 | Munoz (ARG); W 3-0 | 2 | did not advance | | | | |
| Viktoriia Safonova | Women's singles C6-7 | Ovsyannikova (RUS); L 2–3 | Na Y R (KOR); W 3–1 | 2 | did not advance | | | | |
| Antonina Khodzynska; Yuliya Klymenko; Viktoriia Safonova | Women's team C6-10 | No preliminaries | | | Australia (AUS); W 3-0 | China (CHN); L 0-3 | did not advance | | |

=== Volleyball ===
The women's volleyball team didn't win any medals, they were 5th out of 8 teams.

==== Players ====
- Anzhelika Churkina
- Oleksandra Granovska
- Larys Klochkova
- Galyna Kuznetsova
- Liubov Lomakina
- Alla Lysenko
- Inna Osetynska
- Margaryta Pryvalykhina
- Ilona Yudina

==== Tournament ====
Group A matches

| 8 September 2008; 12:00 | Ukraine (UKR) | 1–3 | Netherlands (NED) | China Agricultural University Gymnasium |
| 8 September 2008; 12:00 | (15–25, 25–23, 21–25, 19–25) | | | China Agricultural University Gymnasium |

| 9 September 2008; 16:00 | Slovenia (SLO) | 3-1 | Ukraine (UKR) | China Agricultural University Gymnasium |
| 9 September 2008; 16:00 | (11–25, 25–18, 25–17, 25–22) | | | China Agricultural University Gymnasium |

| 10 September 2008; 12:00 | Ukraine (UKR) | 3-0 | Japan (JPN) | China Agricultural University Gymnasium |
| 10 September 2008; 12:00 | (25–16, 25–14, 25–18) | | | China Agricultural University Gymnasium |

5-8th Classification

| 12 September 2008; 13:00 | Latvia (LAT) | 0–3 | Ukraine (UKR) | China Agricultural University Gymnasium |
| 12 September 2008; 13:00 | (10–25, 12–25, 13–25) | | | China Agricultural University Gymnasium |

5th-6th match

| 13 September 2008; 14:00 | Ukraine (UKR) | 3-0 | Lithuania (LTU) | China Agricultural University Gymnasium |
| 13 September 2008; 14:00 | (25–18, 25–19, 25–19) | | | China Agricultural University Gymnasium |

=== Wheelchair fencing ===
==== Men ====
| Athlete | Event | Qualification | | | Round of 16 | Quarterfinal | Semifinal | Final / BM | |
| Athlete | Event | Opposition | Score | Rank | Opposition Score | Opposition Score | Opposition Score | Opposition Score | Rank |
|---|---|---|---|---|---|---|---|---|---|
| Mykhaylo Bazhukov | Men's épée A | Zhang L (CHN) | L 3–5 | 4 Q | Davydenko (UKR); W 15–14 | Maillard (FRA); L 14–15 | did not advance | | |
| Mykhaylo Bazhukov | Men's épée A | Citerne (FRA) | W 5-4 | 4 Q | Davydenko (UKR); W 15–14 | Maillard (FRA); L 14–15 | did not advance | | |
| Mykhaylo Bazhukov | Men's épée A | Pender (POL) | L 3-5 | 4 Q | Davydenko (UKR); W 15–14 | Maillard (FRA); L 14–15 | did not advance | | |
| Mykhaylo Bazhukov | Men's épée A | Granell (ESP) | W 5-2 | 4 Q | Davydenko (UKR); W 15–14 | Maillard (FRA); L 14–15 | did not advance | | |
| Mykhaylo Bazhukov | Men's épée A | Andree (GER) | W 5-4 | 4 Q | Davydenko (UKR); W 15–14 | Maillard (FRA); L 14–15 | did not advance | | |
| Mykhaylo Bazhukov | Men's foil A | Ye R (CHN) | L 0-5 | 3 Q | Al Qallaf (KUW); L 9-15 | did not advance | | | |
| Mykhaylo Bazhukov | Men's foil A | Chan W K (HKG) | L 3-5 | 3 Q | Al Qallaf (KUW); L 9-15 | did not advance | | | |
| Mykhaylo Bazhukov | Men's foil A | Makowski (POL) | L 3-5 | 3 Q | Al Qallaf (KUW); L 9-15 | did not advance | | | |
| Mykhaylo Bazhukov | Men's foil A | Frolov (RUS) | W 5-1 | 3 Q | Al Qallaf (KUW); L 9-15 | did not advance | | | |
| Mykhaylo Bazhukov | Men's foil A | Calhoun (USA) | W 5-1 | 3 Q | Al Qallaf (KUW); L 9-15 | did not advance | | | |
| Anton Datsko | Men's foil B | Francois (FRA) | L 0-5 | 3 Q | Wyganowski (POL); W 15-12 | Francois (FRA); L 10-15 | did not advance | | |
| Anton Datsko | Men's foil B | Czop (POL) | L 1-5 | 3 Q | Wyganowski (POL); W 15-12 | Francois (FRA); L 10-15 | did not advance | | |
| Anton Datsko | Men's foil B | Rodgers (USA) | W 5-3 | 3 Q | Wyganowski (POL); W 15-12 | Francois (FRA); L 10-15 | did not advance | | |
| Anton Datsko | Men's foil B | Alsaedi (KUW) | W 5-4 | 3 Q | Wyganowski (POL); W 15-12 | Francois (FRA); L 10-15 | did not advance | | |
| Anton Datsko | Men's foil B | Fawcett (GBR) | W 5-1 | 3 Q | Wyganowski (POL); W 15-12 | Francois (FRA); L 10-15 | did not advance | | |
| Anton Datsko | Men's sabre B | Cratere (FRA) | L 1-5 | 3 Q | Yusupov (RUS); L 8-15 | did not advance | | | |
| Anton Datsko | Men's sabre B | Bogdos (GRE) | L 4-5 | 3 Q | Yusupov (RUS); L 8-15 | did not advance | | | |
| Anton Datsko | Men's sabre B | Sarri (ITA) | W 5-3 | 3 Q | Yusupov (RUS); L 8-15 | did not advance | | | |
| Anton Datsko | Men's sabre B | Czop (POL) | W 5-2 | 3 Q | Yusupov (RUS); L 8-15 | did not advance | | | |
| Anton Datsko | Men's sabre B | Williams (USA) | W 5-2 | 3 Q | Yusupov (RUS); L 8-15 | did not advance | | | |
| Mykola Davydenko | Men's épée A | Maillard (FRA) | L 4-5 | 4 Q | Bazhukov (UKR); L 14-15 | did not advance | | | |
| Mykola Davydenko | Men's épée A | Pylarinos Markantonatos (GRE) | W 5-4 | 4 Q | Bazhukov (UKR); L 14-15 | did not advance | | | |
| Mykola Davydenko | Men's épée A | Alhaddad (KUW) | W 5-1 | 4 Q | Bazhukov (UKR); L 14-15 | did not advance | | | |
| Mykola Davydenko | Men's épée A | Saengsawang (THA) | L 0-5 | 4 Q | Bazhukov (UKR); L 14-15 | did not advance | | | |
| Mykola Davydenko | Men's épée A | L Sanchez (ESP) | W 5-2 | 4 Q | Bazhukov (UKR); L 14-15 | did not advance | | | |
| Mykola Davydenko | Men's épée A | Serafini (ITA) | W 5-2 | 4 Q | Bazhukov (UKR); L 14-15 | did not advance | | | |
| Mykola Davydenko | Men's sabre A | Tian J (CHN) | L 3-5 | 4 Q | More (FRA); W 15-13 | Chan W K (HKG); L 10-15 | did not advance | | |
| Mykola Davydenko | Men's sabre A | Chan W K (HKG) | L 0-5 | 4 Q | More (FRA); W 15-13 | Chan W K (HKG); L 10-15 | did not advance | | |
| Mykola Davydenko | Men's sabre A | Pylarinos Markantonatos (GRE) | L 2-5 | 4 Q | More (FRA); W 15-13 | Chan W K (HKG); L 10-15 | did not advance | | |
| Mykola Davydenko | Men's sabre A | Serafini (ITA) | W 5-3 | 4 Q | More (FRA); W 15-13 | Chan W K (HKG); L 10-15 | did not advance | | |
| Mykola Davydenko | Men's sabre A | Redondo (ESP) | W 5-1 | 4 Q | More (FRA); W 15-13 | Chan W K (HKG); L 10-15 | did not advance | | |
| Andriy Komar | Men's épée B | Latreche (FRA) | L 3-5 | 1 Q | — | Hu D (CHN); L 10-15 | did not advance | | |
| Andriy Komar | Men's épée B | Poleshchuk (RUS) | W 5-3 | 1 Q | — | Hu D (CHN); L 10-15 | did not advance | | |
| Andriy Komar | Men's épée B | Bogdos (GRE) | W 5-2 | 1 Q | — | Hu D (CHN); L 10-15 | did not advance | | |
| Andriy Komar | Men's épée B | Williams (USA) | W 5-3 | 1 Q | — | Hu D (CHN); L 10-15 | did not advance | | |
| Andriy Komar | Men's épée B | Alsaedi (KUW) | W 5-2 | 1 Q | — | Hu D (CHN); L 10-15 | did not advance | | |
| Andriy Komar | Men's foil B | Hu D (CHN) | L 2-5 | 4 Q | Sarri (ITA); W 15-9 | Latreche (FRA); W 15-14 | Francois (FRA); L 8-15 | Szekeres (HUN); L 10-15 | 4 |
| Andriy Komar | Men's foil B | Hui C H (HKG) | L 2-5 | 4 Q | Sarri (ITA); W 15-9 | Latreche (FRA); W 15-14 | Francois (FRA); L 8-15 | Szekeres (HUN); L 10-15 | 4 |
| Andriy Komar | Men's foil B | Szekeres (HUN) | L 1-5 | 4 Q | Sarri (ITA); W 15-9 | Latreche (FRA); W 15-14 | Francois (FRA); L 8-15 | Szekeres (HUN); L 10-15 | 4 |
| Andriy Komar | Men's foil B | Moreno (USA) | W 5-1 | 4 Q | Sarri (ITA); W 15-9 | Latreche (FRA); W 15-14 | Francois (FRA); L 8-15 | Szekeres (HUN); L 10-15 | 4 |
| Andriy Komar | Men's foil B | Kim G H (KOR) | W 5-4 | 4 Q | Sarri (ITA); W 15-9 | Latreche (FRA); W 15-14 | Francois (FRA); L 8-15 | Szekeres (HUN); L 10-15 | 4 |
| Serhiy Shenkevych | Men's épée B | Bezyazychny (BLR) | L 4-5 | 1 Q | Ding B (CHN); W 15-9 | Latreche (FRA); W 15-13 | Hu D (CHN); L 9-15 | Cratere (FRA); W 15-12 | 3rd place, bronze medalist(s) |
| Serhiy Shenkevych | Men's épée B | Kim G H (KOR) | W 5-1 | 1 Q | Ding B (CHN); W 15-9 | Latreche (FRA); W 15-13 | Hu D (CHN); L 9-15 | Cratere (FRA); W 15-12 | 3rd place, bronze medalist(s) |
| Serhiy Shenkevych | Men's épée B | Mari (ITA) | W 5-3 | 1 Q | Ding B (CHN); W 15-9 | Latreche (FRA); W 15-13 | Hu D (CHN); L 9-15 | Cratere (FRA); W 15-12 | 3rd place, bronze medalist(s) |
| Serhiy Shenkevych | Men's épée B | Ding B (CHN) | W 5-4 | 1 Q | Ding B (CHN); W 15-9 | Latreche (FRA); W 15-13 | Hu D (CHN); L 9-15 | Cratere (FRA); W 15-12 | 3rd place, bronze medalist(s) |
| Serhiy Shenkevych | Men's épée B | Pluta (POL) | W 5-4 | 1 Q | Ding B (CHN); W 15-9 | Latreche (FRA); W 15-13 | Hu D (CHN); L 9-15 | Cratere (FRA); W 15-12 | 3rd place, bronze medalist(s) |
| Serhiy Shenkevych | Men's sabre B | Francois (FRA) | L 3-5 | 2 Q | Fawcett (GBR); W 15-4 | Mari (ITA); W 15-5 | Francois (FRA); L 8-15 | Cratere (FRA); W 15-8 | 3rd place, bronze medalist(s) |
| Serhiy Shenkevych | Men's sabre B | Szekeres (HUN) | W 5-4 | 2 Q | Fawcett (GBR); W 15-4 | Mari (ITA); W 15-5 | Francois (FRA); L 8-15 | Cratere (FRA); W 15-8 | 3rd place, bronze medalist(s) |
| Serhiy Shenkevych | Men's sabre B | Fawcett (GBR) | W 5-3 | 2 Q | Fawcett (GBR); W 15-4 | Mari (ITA); W 15-5 | Francois (FRA); L 8-15 | Cratere (FRA); W 15-8 | 3rd place, bronze medalist(s) |
| Serhiy Shenkevych | Men's sabre B | Arnau (ESP) | W 5-4 | 2 Q | Fawcett (GBR); W 15-4 | Mari (ITA); W 15-5 | Francois (FRA); L 8-15 | Cratere (FRA); W 15-8 | 3rd place, bronze medalist(s) |
| Serhiy Shenkevych | Men's sabre B | Mainville (CAN) | W 5-2 | 2 Q | Fawcett (GBR); W 15-4 | Mari (ITA); W 15-5 | Francois (FRA); L 8-15 | Cratere (FRA); W 15-8 | 3rd place, bronze medalist(s) |

==== Women ====
| Athlete | Event | Qualification | | | Round of 16 | Quarterfinal | Semifinal | Final / BM | |
| Athlete | Event | Opposition | Score | Rank | Opposition Score | Opposition Score | Opposition Score | Opposition Score | Rank |
|---|---|---|---|---|---|---|---|---|---|
| Alla Gorlina | Women's épée A | Zhang C (CHN) | L 4–5 | 2 Q | — | Krajnyak (HUN); L 5-15 | did not advance | | |
| Alla Gorlina | Women's épée A | Krajnyak (HUN) | W 5-3 | 2 Q | — | Krajnyak (HUN); L 5-15 | did not advance | | |
| Alla Gorlina | Women's épée A | Fan P S (HKG) | L 4-5 | 2 Q | — | Krajnyak (HUN); L 5-15 | did not advance | | |
| Alla Gorlina | Women's épée A | Trigilia (ITA) | W 5-3 | 2 Q | — | Krajnyak (HUN); L 5-15 | did not advance | | |
| Alla Gorlina | Women's épée A | Picot (FRA) | W 5-2 | 2 Q | — | Krajnyak (HUN); L 5-15 | did not advance | | |
| Alla Gorlina | Women's foil A | Poignet (FRA) | L 0-5 | 5 Q | Zhang W (CHN); L 4-15 | did not advance | | | |
| Alla Gorlina | Women's foil A | Fan P S (HKG) | L 1-5 | 5 Q | Zhang W (CHN); L 4-15 | did not advance | | | |
| Alla Gorlina | Women's foil A | Krajnyak (HUN) | W 5-2 | 5 Q | Zhang W (CHN); L 4-15 | did not advance | | | |
| Alla Gorlina | Women's foil A | Zhang W (CHN) | L 1-5 | 5 Q | Zhang W (CHN); L 4-15 | did not advance | | | |
| Alla Gorlina | Women's foil A | Witos-Eze (POL) | W 5-0 | 5 Q | Zhang W (CHN); L 4-15 | did not advance | | | |
| Iryna Lukianenko | Women's épée B | Jana (THA) | L 0-5 | 5 | did not advance | | | | |
| Iryna Lukianenko | Women's épée B | Chan Y C (HKG) | L 3-5 | 5 | did not advance | | | | |
| Iryna Lukianenko | Women's épée B | Ye H (CHN) | L 4-5 | 5 | did not advance | | | | |
| Iryna Lukianenko | Women's épée B | Dani (HUN) | L 2-5 | 5 | did not advance | | | | |
| Iryna Lukianenko | Women's épée B | Hassen Bey (ESP) | W 5-1 | 5 | did not advance | | | | |
| Iryna Lukianenko | Women's foil B | Yao F (CHN) | L 4-5 | 3 Q | — | Ye H (CHN); L 8-15 | did not advance | | |
| Iryna Lukianenko | Women's foil B | Dani (HUN) | L 3-5 | 3 Q | — | Ye H (CHN); L 8-15 | did not advance | | |
| Iryna Lukianenko | Women's foil B | Magnat (FRA) | W 5-1 | 3 Q | — | Ye H (CHN); L 8-15 | did not advance | | |
| Iryna Lukianenko | Women's foil B | Hassen Bey (ESP) | W 5-2 | 3 Q | — | Ye H (CHN); L 8-15 | did not advance | | |
| Iryna Lukianenko | Women's foil B | Vettraino (ITA) | W 5-0 | 3 Q | — | Ye H (CHN); L 8-15 | did not advance | | |

== See also ==
- 2008 Summer Paralympics
- Ukraine at the Paralympics
- Ukraine at the 2008 Summer Olympics
