= Swimming at the 2008 Summer Paralympics – Men's 200 metre individual medley SM12 =

Men's 200m Individual Medley SM12 at the XIII Paralympic Games
- Venue: Beijing National Aquatics Center
- Dates: 10 September
- Competitors: 10 from 5 nations
- Winning time: 2:12.71

Medalists
1st place, gold medalist(s)		Maksym Veraksa	Ukraine
2nd place, silver medalist(s)		Alexander Nevolin-Svetov	Russia
3rd place, bronze medalist(s)		Sergii Klippert	Ukraine

The men's 200m individual medley SM12 event at the 2008 Summer Paralympics took place at the Beijing National Aquatics Center on 10 September. There were two heats; the swimmers with the eight fastest times advanced to the final.

== Results ==
=== Heats ===
Competed from 09:54.

==== Heat 1 ====
Rank	Name	Nationality	Time	Notes
1	Alexander Nevolin-Svetov	Russia	2:17.94	Q
2	Sergii Klippert	Ukraine	2:19.84	Q
3	Tucker Dupree	United States	2:20.32	Q
4	Raman Makarau	Belarus	2:21.57	Q
5	Anton Stabrovskyy	Ukraine	2:32.94	

==== Heat 2 ====
Rank	Name	Nationality	Time	Notes
1	Maksym Veraksa	Ukraine	2:15.44	Q
2	Sergei Punko	Belarus	2:19.43	Q
3	Enrique Floriano	Spain	2:19.87	Q
4	Albert Gelis	Spain	2:23.64	Q
5	Israel Oliver	Spain	2:25.12	

=== Final ===
Competed at 18:32.

Rank	Name	Nationality	Time	Notes
1st place, gold medalist(s)	Maksym Veraksa	Ukraine	2:12.71	WR
2nd place, silver medalist(s)	Alexander Nevolin-Svetov	Russia	2:13.86	
3rd place, bronze medalist(s)	Sergii Klippert	Ukraine	2:14.05	
4	Enrique Floriano	Spain	2:16.79	
5	Raman Makarau	Belarus	2:18.92	
6	Tucker Dupree	United States	2:19.12	
7	Albert Gelis	Spain	2:24.80	
	Sergei Punko	Belarus		DQ

Q = qualified for final. WR = World Record. DQ = Disqualified.
