= Swimming at the 2008 Summer Paralympics – Men's 100 metre freestyle S12 =

Men's 100m Freestyle S12 at the XIII Paralympic Games
- Venue: Beijing National Aquatics Center
- Dates: 12 September
- Competitors: 14 from 8 nations
- Winning time: 51.93

Medalists
1st place, gold medalist(s)		Maksym Veraksa	Ukraine
2nd place, silver medalist(s)		Sergii Klippert	Ukraine
3rd place, bronze medalist(s)		Alexander Nevolin-Svetov	Russia

The men's 100m freestyle S12 event at the 2008 Summer Paralympics took place at the Beijing National Aquatics Center on 12 September. There were two heats; the swimmers with the eight fastest times advanced to the final.

== Results ==
=== Heats ===
Competed from 09:47.

==== Heat 1 ====
Rank	Name	Nationality	Time	Notes
1	Sergii Klippert	Ukraine	54.40	Q, PR
2	Alexander Nevolin-Svetov	Russia	55.00	Q
3	Tucker Dupree	United States	55.16	Q
4	Albert Gelis	Spain	58.15	Q
5	Alexander Pikalov	Russia	58.18	
6	Ziv Better	Israel	1:01.13	
7	Sergiy Demchuk	Ukraine	1:03.02	

==== Heat 2 ====
Rank	Name	Nationality	Time	Notes
1	Maksym Veraksa	Ukraine	54.32	Q, PR
2	Raman Makarau	Belarus	55.29	Q
3	Sergei Punko	Belarus	55.67	Q
4	Omar Font	Spain	56.01	Q
5	Alessandro Serpico	Italy	58.47	
6	Enrique Floriano	Spain	59.38	
7	Robert Musiorski	Poland	1:00.90	

=== Final ===
Competed at 17:48.

Rank	Name	Nationality	Time	Notes
1st place, gold medalist(s)	Maksym Veraksa	Ukraine	51.93	WR
2nd place, silver medalist(s)	Sergii Klippert	Ukraine	53.81	
3rd place, bronze medalist(s)	Alexander Nevolin-Svetov	Russia	54.58	
4	Raman Makarau	Belarus	54.77	
5	Sergei Punko	Belarus	54.99	
6	Omar Font	Spain	55.75	
7	Tucker Dupree	United States	56.16	
8	Albert Gelis	Spain	58.70	

Q = qualified for final. WR = World Record. PR = Paralympic Record.
