= Swimming at the 2004 Summer Paralympics – Men's 100 metre freestyle S12 =

Men's 100m Freestyle S12 at the XII Paralympic Games
- Paralympic Swimming
- Venue: Olympic Aquatic Centre
- Dates: 24 September 2004
- Competitors: 18 from 11 nations
- Winning time: 54.49

Medalists
1st place, gold medalist(s)		Raman Makarau	Belarus
2nd place, silver medalist(s)		Dmytro Aleksyeyev	Ukraine
3rd place, bronze medalist(s)		Sergei Punko	Belarus

The Men's 100 metre freestyle S12 swimming event at the 2004 Summer Paralympics was competed on 24 September. It was won by Raman Makarau, representing Belarus.

== 1st round ==
Qualified for final round

Heat 1

24 Sept. 2004, morning session

Rank	Athlete	Time	Notes
1	Dmytro Aleksyeyev (UKR)	56.72	
2	Yoshikazu Sakai (JPN)	58.90	
3	Robert Musiorski (POL)	59.13	
4	Ziv Better (ISR)	1:00.15	
5	Albert Gelis (ESP)	1:00.60	
6	Alessandro Serpico (ITA)	1:01.87	

Heat 2

24 Sept. 2004, morning session

Rank	Athlete	Time	Notes
1	Raman Makarau (BLR)	55.83	PR
2	Darren Leach (GBR)	58.16	
3	Ebert Kleynhans (RSA)	58.95	
4	Sergiy Demchuk (UKR)	59.20	
5	Daniel Llambrich (ESP)	1:01.59	
6	Dmitri Kravtsevich (BLR)	1:05.85	

Heat 3

24 Sept. 2004, morning session

Rank	Athlete	Time	Notes
1	Sergei Punko (BLR)	56.29	
2	Dmytro Kuzmin (UKR)	57.49	
3	Enrique Floriano (ESP)	58.52	
4	Kosei Egawa (JPN)	59.47	
5	Wu Bin (CHN)	59.54	
6	Emmanuel Provost (FRA)	1:00.46	

== Final round ==
24 Sept. 2004, evening session

Rank	Athlete	Time	Notes
1st place, gold medalist(s)	Raman Makarau (BLR)	54.49	WR
2nd place, silver medalist(s)	Dmytro Aleksyeyev (UKR)	55.35	
3rd place, bronze medalist(s)	Sergei Punko (BLR)	55.54	
4	Dmytro Kuzmin (UKR)	56.13	
5	Darren Leach (GBR)	57.64	
6	Enrique Floriano (ESP)	58.69	
7	Yoshikazu Sakai (JPN)	59.05	
8	Ebert Kleynhans (RSA)	59.38	
