= Swimming at the 2012 Summer Paralympics – Men's 100 metre butterfly S12 =

Event at the 2012 Summer Paralympics

Men's 100m Butterfly S12 at the XIV Paralympic Games
- Venue: London Aquatics Centre
- Dates: 2 September 2012
- Competitors: 16 from 10 nations
- Winning time: 57.21

Medalists
1st place, gold medalist(s)		Roman Makarov	Russia
2nd place, silver medalist(s)		Sergey Punko	Russia
3rd place, bronze medalist(s)		James Clegg	Great Britain

The men's 100m butterfly S12 event at the 2012 Summer Paralympics took place at the London Aquatics Centre on 2 September. There were two heats; the swimmers with the eight fastest times advanced to the final.

== Results ==
=== Heats ===
Competed from 10:56.

==== Heat 1 ====
Rank	Lane	Name	Nationality	Time	Notes
1	3	James Clegg	Great Britain	59.99	Q
2	4	Sergey Punko	Russia	1:00.14	Q
3	5	Anton Stabrovskyy	Ukraine	1:00.62	Q
4	6	Daniel Simon	Germany	1:02.51	Q
5	2	Uladzimir Izotau	Belarus	1:02.89	
6	7	Fabrizio Sottile	Italy	1:03.97	
7	1	Yury Rudzenok	Belarus	1:08.25	
8	8	Anuar Akhmetov	Kazakhstan	1:15.89	

==== Heat 2 ====
Rank	Lane	Name	Nationality	Time	Notes
1	4	Roman Makarov	Russia	57.53	Q
2	5	Tucker Dupree	United States	59.89	Q
3	3	Omar Font	Spain	1:01.07	Q
4	2	Daniel Giraldo Correa	Colombia	1:02.72	Q
5	6	Albert Gelis	Spain	1:03.05	
6	7	Sergii Klippert	Ukraine	1:04.29	
7	1	Oleg Tkalienko	Ukraine	1:06.56	
8	8	Jose Ramon Cantero Elvira	Spain	1:09.20	

=== Final ===
Competed at 19:02.

Rank	Lane	Name	Nationality	Time	Notes
1st place, gold medalist(s)	4	Roman Makarov	Russia	57.21	
2nd place, silver medalist(s)	6	Sergey Punko	Russia	59.47	
3rd place, bronze medalist(s)	3	James Clegg	Great Britain	1:00.00	
4	5	Tucker Dupree	United States	1:00.15	
5	2	Anton Stabrovskyy	Ukraine	1:00.17	
6	7	Omar Font	Spain	1:00.59	
7	1	Daniel Simon	Germany	1:02.10	
8	8	Daniel Giraldo Correa	Colombia	1:02.75	

Q = qualified for final.
