= Swimming at the 2012 Summer Paralympics – Men's 100 metre freestyle S12 =

Event at the 2012 Summer Paralympics

Men's 100m Freestyle S12 at the XIV Paralympic Games
- Venue: London Aquatics Centre
- Dates: 4 September 2012
- Competitors: 15 from 10 nations
- Winning time: 51.40

Medalists
| 1st place, gold medalist(s) | | Maksym Veraksa | Ukraine |
| 2nd place, silver medalist(s) | | Aleksandr Nevolin-Svetov | Russia |
| 3rd place, bronze medalist(s) | | Tucker Dupree | United States |

The men's 100m freestyle S12 event at the 2012 Summer Paralympics took place at the London Aquatics Centre on 4 September. There were two heats; the swimmers with the eight fastest times advanced to the final.

== Results ==
=== Heats ===
Competed from 11:17.

==== Heat 1 ====
| Rank | Lane | Name | Nationality | Time | Notes |
|---|---|---|---|---|---|
| 1 | 4 | Aleksandr Nevolin-Svetov | Russia | 52.65 | Q |
| 2 | 5 | Sergey Punko | Russia | 55.99 | Q |
| 3 | 2 | James Clegg | Great Britain | 56.05 | Q |
| 4 | 3 | Sergii Klippert | Ukraine | 56.10 | Q |
| 5 | 6 | Fabrizio Sottile | Italy | 56.11 | |
| 6 | 1 | Jose Ramon Cantero Elvira | Spain | 1:00.30 | |
| 7 | 7 | Oleg Tkalienko | Ukraine | 1:01.24 | |

==== Heat 2 ====
| Rank | Lane | Name | Nationality | Time | Notes |
|---|---|---|---|---|---|
| 1 | 4 | Maksym Veraksa | Ukraine | 52.63 | Q |
| 2 | 5 | Tucker Dupree | United States | 55.10 | Q |
| 3 | 3 | Omar Font | Spain | 55.28 | Q |
| 4 | 6 | Roman Makarov | Russia | 55.33 | Q |
| 5 | 2 | Daniel Simon | Germany | 56.59 | |
| 6 | 7 | Daniel Giraldo Correa | Colombia | 56.78 | |
| 7 | 1 | Pedro Enrique Gonzalez Valdiviezo | Venezuela | 1:00.25 | |
| 8 | 8 | Peter Tichy | Austria | 1:04.83 | |

=== Final ===
Competed at 19:35.

| Rank | Lane | Name | Nationality | Time | Notes |
|---|---|---|---|---|---|
| 1st place, gold medalist(s) | 4 | Maksym Veraksa | Ukraine | 51.40 | PR |
| 2nd place, silver medalist(s) | 5 | Aleksandr Nevolin-Svetov | Russia | 51.70 | |
| 3rd place, bronze medalist(s) | 3 | Tucker Dupree | United States | 54.41 | AM |
| 4 | 6 | Omar Font | Spain | 54.70 | |
| 5 | 2 | Roman Makarov | Russia | 55.34 | |
| 6 | 7 | Sergey Punko | Russia | 55.44 | |
| 7 | 8 | Sergii Klippert | Ukraine | 55.50 | |
| 8 | 1 | James Clegg | Great Britain | 55.94 | |

Q = qualified for final. PR = Paralympic Record. AM = Americas Record.
