= Swimming at the 2008 Summer Paralympics – Men's 100 metre butterfly S13 =

Event at the 2008 Summer Paralympics

Men's 100 metre butterfly S13 at the XIII Paralympic Games
- Venue: Beijing National Aquatics Center
- Dates: September 7
- Competitors: 17 from 11 nations
- Winning time: 58.89

Medalists
1st place, gold medalist(s)		Dzmitry Salei	Belarus
2nd place, silver medalist(s)		Charalampos Taiganidis	Greece
3rd place, bronze medalist(s)		Andrey Strokin	Russia

The men's 100 metre butterfly S13 event at the 2008 Paralympic Games took place on September 7, at the Beijing National Aquatics Center.

Three heats were held, with five swimmers in the first heat and six swimmers in each of the second and third heat. The swimmers with the eight fastest times advanced to the final; there, they all competed in a single final heat to earn final placements.

== Heats ==
=== Heat 1 ===
Rank	Lane	Name	Nationality	Time	Notes
1	4	Andrey Strokin	Russia	1:00.60	Q
2	3	Oleksii Fedyna	Ukraine	1:01.54	Q
3	5	Danylo Chufarov	Ukraine	1:02.65	Q
4	6	Dmytro Aleksyeyev	Ukraine	1:02.67	Q
5	2	Michel Tielbeke	Netherlands	1:03.94	

=== Heat 2 ===
Rank	Lane	Name	Nationality	Time	Notes
1	6	Dzmitry Salei	Belarus	1:00.08	Q
2	5	Daniel Simon	Germany	1:02.30	Q
3	3	Kevin Mendez	Spain	1:03.02	
4	2	Uladzimir Izotau	Belarus	1:03.20	
5	4	Brian Hill	Canada	1:03.25	
6	7	Devin Gotell	Canada	1:09.37	

=== Heat 3 ===
Rank	Lane	Name	Nationality	Time	Notes
1	4	Charalampos Taiganidis	Greece	1:00.52	Q
2	2	Charl Bouwer	South Africa	1:02.37	Q
3	5	Dervis Konuralp	Great Britain	1:02.91	
4	3	Dave Ellis	Great Britain	1:03.58	
5	6	Daniel Clausner	Germany	1:04.09	
6	7	Martin Stepanek	Czech Republic	1:06.93	

== Final ==
Rank	Lane	Name	Nationality	Time	Notes
1	4	Dzmitry Salei	Belarus	58.89	
2	5	Charalampos Taiganidis	Greece	59.24	
3	3	Andrey Strokin	Russia	1:00.83	
4	1	Danylo Chufarov	Ukraine	1:00.95	
5	6	Oleksii Fedyna	Ukraine	1:01.54	
6	7	Charl Bouwer	South Africa	1:01.72	
7	2	Daniel Simon	Germany	1:02.28	
8	8	Dmytro Aleksyeyev	Ukraine	1:03.32	
