= Athletics at the 2008 Summer Paralympics – Women's 100 metres T37 =

The Women's 100m T37 had its first round held on September 11, at 17:05, and the final was held on September 12 at 10:04.

== Medalists ==
Gold	Lisa McIntosh; Australia
Silver	Viktoriya Kravchenko; Ukraine
Bronze	Maria Seifert; Germany

== Results ==
Place	Athlete	First Round	Final
1	Lisa McIntosh (AUS)	14.27 Q	14.14
2	Viktoriya Kravchenko (UKR)	14.41 Q	14.21
3	Maria Seifert (GER)	14.36 Q	14.28
4	Isabelle Foerder (GER)	14.28 Q	14.54
5	Marta Langner (POL)	15.04 Q	14.94
6	Oksana Krechunyak (UKR)	14.85 Q	15.09
7	Katrina Hart (GBR)	14.94 q	15.12
8	Svetlana Sergeeva (RUS)	14.87 q	15.24
9	Natalia Jasinska (POL)	15.17	
10	Tahlia Rotumah (AUS)	15.22	
11	Evgenia Trushnikova (RUS)	15.35	
12	Leah Robinson (CAN)	15.35	
13	Jenny McLoughlin (GBR)	15.42	
14	Melanie Barthe (FRA)	15.53	
15	Sabra Hawkes (USA)	15.75	
16	Megan Muscat (CAN)	15.84	
17	Liene Gruzite (LAT)	16.83	
