= Swimming at the 2008 Summer Paralympics – Men's 50 metre freestyle S13 =

Men's 50m Freestyle S13 at the XIII Paralympic Games
- Venue: Beijing National Aquatics Center
- Dates: 15 September
- Competitors: 17 from 13 nations
- Winning time: 23.75

Medalists
1st place, gold medalist(s)		Oleksii Fedyna	Ukraine
2nd place, silver medalist(s)		Charalampos Taiganidis	Greece
3rd place, bronze medalist(s)		Andrey Strokin	Russia

The men's 50m freestyle S13 event at the 2008 Summer Paralympics took place at the Beijing National Aquatics Center on 15 September. There were three heats; the swimmers with the eight fastest times advanced to the final.

== Results ==
=== Heats ===
Competed from 10:23.

==== Heat 1 ====
Rank	Name	Nationality	Time	Notes
1	Andrey Strokin	Russia	24.81	Q
2	Danylo Chufarov	Ukraine	25.34	
3	Daniel Simon	Germany	26.07	
4	Dave Ellis	Great Britain	26.46	
5	Brian Hill	Canada	26.84	

==== Heat 2 ====
Rank	Name	Nationality	Time	Notes
1	Charalampos Taiganidis	Greece	24.56	Q, PR
2	Carlos Farrenberg	Brazil	25.01	Q
3	Daniel Sharp	New Zealand	25.30	Q
4	Charl Bouwer	South Africa	25.41	
5	Robert Doerries	Germany	26.38	
6	Michel Tielbeke	Netherlands	26.52	

==== Heat 3 ====
Rank	Name	Nationality	Time	Notes
1	Oleksii Fedyna	Ukraine	24.72	Q
2	Dmytro Aleksyeyev	Ukraine	25.13	Q
3	Daniel Clausner	Germany	25.22	Q
4	Dzmitry Salei	Belarus	25.23	Q
5	Martin Stepanek	Czech Republic	26.11	
6	Andrea Palantrani	Italy	26.71	

=== Final ===
Competed at 19:35.

Rank	Name	Nationality	Time	Notes
1st place, gold medalist(s)	Oleksii Fedyna	Ukraine	23.75	WR
2nd place, silver medalist(s)	Charalampos Taiganidis	Greece	24.19	
3rd place, bronze medalist(s)	Andrey Strokin	Russia	24.55	
4	Carlos Farrenberg	Brazil	24.62	
5	Dzmitry Salei	Belarus	24.92	
6	Dmytro Aleksyeyev	Ukraine	25.13	
7	Daniel Clausner	Germany	25.39	
8	Daniel Sharp	New Zealand	25.50	

Q = qualified for final. WR = World Record. PR = Paralympic Record.
