= Swimming at the 2012 Summer Paralympics – Men's 50 metre freestyle S12 =

Event at the 2012 Summer Paralympics

Men's 50m Freestyle S12 at the XIV Paralympic Games
- Venue: London Aquatics Centre
- Dates: 7 September 2012
- Competitors: 18 from 13 nations
- Winning time: 23.60

Medalists
1st place, gold medalist(s)		Maksym Veraksa	Ukraine
2nd place, silver medalist(s)		Aleksandr Nevolin-Svetov	Russia
3rd place, bronze medalist(s)		Tucker Dupree	United States

The men's 50m freestyle S12 event at the 2012 Summer Paralympics took place at the London Aquatics Centre on 7 September. There were three heats; the swimmers with the eight fastest times advanced to the final.

== Results ==
=== Heats ===
Competed from 11:15.

==== Heat 1 ====
Rank	Lane	Name	Nationality	Time	Notes
1	4	Tucker Dupree	United States	24.52	Q, AM
2	5	Sergii Klippert	Ukraine	25.58	
3	3	Daniel Giraldo Correa	Colombia	25.80	
4	2	Pedro Enrique Gonzalez Valdiviezo	Venezuela	27.08	
5	6	Oleg Tkalienko	Ukraine	27.40	
6	7	Peter Tichy	Austria	28.78	

==== Heat 2 ====
Rank	Lane	Name	Nationality	Time	Notes
1	4	Aleksandr Nevolin-Svetov	Russia	24.29	Q
2	3	Daniel Simon	Germany	25.35	Q
3	5	Roman Makarov	Russia	25.52	Q
3	6	James Clegg	Great Britain	25.52	Q
5	2	Anuar Akhmetov	Kazakhstan	26.90	
6	7	Jose Ramon Cantero Elvira	Spain	28.41	

==== Heat 3 ====
Rank	Lane	Name	Nationality	Time	Notes
1	4	Maksym Veraksa	Ukraine	23.80	Q
2	5	Omar Font	Spain	25.18	Q
3	6	Uladzimir Izotau	Belarus	25.42	Q
4	3	Fabrizio Sottile	Italy	25.82	
5	2	Albert Gelis	Spain	27.13	
6	7	Jeremy McClure	Australia	28.77	

=== Final ===
Competed at 19:49.

Rank	Lane	Name	Nationality	Time	Notes
1st place, gold medalist(s)	4	Maksym Veraksa	Ukraine	23.60	
2nd place, silver medalist(s)	5	Aleksandr Nevolin-Svetov	Russia	23.96	
3rd place, bronze medalist(s)	3	Tucker Dupree	United States	24.37	AM
4	6	Omar Font	Spain	24.75	
5	7	Uladzimir Izotau	Belarus	24.99	
6	8	James Clegg	Great Britain	25.20	
7	2	Daniel Simon	Germany	25.55	
8	1	Roman Makarov	Russia	25.57	

Q = qualified for final. AM = Americas Record.
