= Athletics at the 2008 Summer Paralympics – Women's 200 metres T37 =

The Women's 200m T37 had its First Round held on September 13, at 11:11 and the Final held on September 14 at 11:08.

== Medalists ==
Gold	Lisa McIntosh; Australia
Silver	Viktoriya Kravchenko; Ukraine
Bronze	Maria Seifert; Germany

== Results ==
Place	Athlete	First Round	Final
1	Lisa McIntosh (AUS)	29.18 Q	29.28
2	Viktoriya Kravchenko (UKR)	30.01 Q	29.60
3	Maria Seifert (GER)	29.92 Q	29.99
4	Isabelle Foerder (GER)	30.51 Q	30.70
5	Evgenia Trushnikova (RUS)	31.51 q	31.06
6	Oksana Krechunyak (UKR)	31.16 Q	31.17
7	Marta Langner (POL)	31.18 Q	31.25
8	Katrina Hart (GBR)	31.24 q	DNS
9	Tahlia Rotumah (AUS)	31.79	
10	Leah Robinson (CAN)	31.85	
11	Natalia Jasinska (POL)	32.01	
12	Sabra Hawkes (USA)	32.36	
13	Jenny McLoughlin (GBR)	32.71	
14	Megan Muscat (CAN)	33.63	
