= Swimming at the 2012 Summer Paralympics – Men's 100 metre backstroke S12 =

Event at the 2012 Summer Paralympics

Men's 100m Backstroke S12 at the XIV Paralympic Games
- Venue: London Aquatics Centre
- Dates: 5 September 2012
- Competitors: 13 from 10 nations
- Winning time: 59.35

Medalists
1st place, gold medalist(s)		Aleksandr Nevolin-Svetov	Russia
2nd place, silver medalist(s)		Tucker Dupree	United States
3rd place, bronze medalist(s)		Sergii Klippert	Ukraine

The men's 100m backstroke S12 event at the 2012 Summer Paralympics took place at the London Aquatics Centre on 5 September. There were two heats; the swimmers with the eight fastest times advanced to the final.

== Results ==
=== Heats ===
Competed from 10:47.

==== Heat 1 ====
Rank	Lane	Name	Nationality	Time	Notes
1	5	Tucker Dupree	United States	1:02.36	Q
2	4	Maksym Veraksa	Ukraine	1:02.63	Q
3	3	Ignacio Gonzalez	Argentina	1:05.72	Q
4	6	Jeremy McClure	Australia	1:07.17	Q
5	2	Daniel Simon	Germany	1:07.34	
6	7	Pedro Enrique Gonzalez Valdiviezo	Venezuela	1:15.03	

==== Heat 2 ====
Rank	Lane	Name	Nationality	Time	Notes
1	4	Aleksandr Nevolin-Svetov	Russia	1:01.07	Q
2	5	Sergii Klippert	Ukraine	1:02.59	Q
3	3	Roman Makarov	Russia	1:03.76	Q
4	6	Albert Gelis	Spain	1:04.32	Q
5	2	Anton Stabrovskyy	Ukraine	1:07.30	
6	7	Anuar Akhmetov	Kazakhstan	1:13.43	
7	1	Peter Tichy	Austria	1:22.06	

=== Final ===
Competed at 18:54.

Rank	Lane	Name	Nationality	Time	Notes
1st place, gold medalist(s)	4	Aleksandr Nevolin-Svetov	Russia	59.35	WR
2nd place, silver medalist(s)	5	Tucker Dupree	United States	1:01.36	AM
3rd place, bronze medalist(s)	3	Sergii Klippert	Ukraine	1:01.55	
4	6	Maksym Veraksa	Ukraine	1:01.82	
5	2	Roman Makarov	Russia	1:03.35	
6	7	Albert Gelis	Spain	1:03.77	
7	1	Ignacio Gonzalez	Argentina	1:04.40	
8	8	Jeremy McClure	Australia	1:07.11	

Q = qualified for final. WR = World Record. AM = Americas Record.
