= Swimming at the 2008 Summer Paralympics – Men's 50 metre freestyle S12 =

Men's 50m Freestyle S12 at the XIII Paralympic Games
- Venue: Beijing National Aquatics Center
- Dates: 14 September
- Competitors: 15 from 9 nations
- Winning time: 23.43

Medalists
1st place, gold medalist(s)		Maksym Veraksa	Ukraine
2nd place, silver medalist(s)		Alexander Nevolin-Svetov	Russia
3rd place, bronze medalist(s)		Sergii Klippert	Ukraine

The men's 50m freestyle S12 event at the 2008 Summer Paralympics took place at the Beijing National Aquatics Center on 14 September. There were two heats; the swimmers with the eight fastest times advanced to the final.

== Results ==
=== Heats ===
Competed from 09:13.

==== Heat 1 ====
Rank	Name	Nationality	Time	Notes
1	Sergii Klippert	Ukraine	24.95	Q
2	Omar Font	Spain	25.61	Q
3	Sergei Punko	Belarus	26.17	Q
4	Alexander Pikalov	Russia	26.27	Q
5	Albert Gelis	Spain	26.74	
6	Daniel Llambrich	Spain	27.41	
7	Jeremy McClure	Australia	27.58	

==== Heat 2 ====
Rank	Name	Nationality	Time	Notes
1	Maksym Veraksa	Ukraine	24.05	Q
2	Alexander Nevolin-Svetov	Russia	25.23	Q
3	Raman Makarau	Belarus	25.39	Q
4	Tucker Dupree	United States	25.41	Q
5	Sergiy Demchuk	Ukraine	27.31	
6	Ziv Better	Israel	27.35	
7	Robert Musiorski	Poland	27.41	
8	Pedro Gonzalez	Venezuela	27.79	

=== Final ===
Competed at 17:10.

Rank	Name	Nationality	Time	Notes
1st place, gold medalist(s)	Maksym Veraksa	Ukraine	23.43	WR
2nd place, silver medalist(s)	Alexander Nevolin-Svetov	Russia	24.73	
3rd place, bronze medalist(s)	Sergii Klippert	Ukraine	24.98	
4	Raman Makarau	Belarus	25.02	
5	Omar Font	Spain	25.26	
6	Tucker Dupree	United States	25.31	
7	Alexander Pikalov	Russia	25.92	
8	Sergei Punko	Belarus	25.97	

Q = qualified for final. WR = World Record.
