= Swimming at the 2008 Summer Paralympics – Men's 100 metre backstroke S12 =

Men's 100m Backstroke S12 at the XIII Paralympic Games
- Venue: Beijing National Aquatics Center
- Dates: 13 September
- Competitors: 9 from 8 nations
- Winning time: 59.37

Medalists
1st place, gold medalist(s)		Alexander Nevolin-Svetov	Russia
2nd place, silver medalist(s)		Sergii Klippert	Ukraine
3rd place, bronze medalist(s)		Maksym Veraksa	Ukraine

The men's 100m backstroke S12 event at the 2008 Summer Paralympics took place at the Beijing National Aquatics Center on 13 September. There were two heats; the swimmers with the eight fastest times advanced to the final.

== Results ==
=== Heats ===
Competed from 09:08.

==== Heat 1 ====
Rank	Name	Nationality	Time	Notes
1	Raman Makarau	Belarus	1:03.75	Q
2	Maksym Veraksa	Ukraine	1:04.19	Q
3	Albert Gelis	Spain	1:05.03	Q
4	Alessandro Serpico	Italy	1:08.91	

==== Heat 2 ====
Rank	Name	Nationality	Time	Notes
1	Alexander Nevolin-Svetov	Russia	1:00.78	Q, WR
2	Sergii Klippert	Ukraine	1:02.24	Q
3	Tucker Dupree	United States	1:04.14	Q
4	Jeremy McClure	Australia	1:05.95	Q
5	Ignacio Gonzalez	Argentina	1:06.80	Q

=== Final ===
Competed at 17:06.

Rank	Name	Nationality	Time	Notes
1st place, gold medalist(s)	Alexander Nevolin-Svetov	Russia	59.37	WR
2nd place, silver medalist(s)	Sergii Klippert	Ukraine	1:00.31	
3rd place, bronze medalist(s)	Maksym Veraksa	Ukraine	1:02.08	
4	Raman Makarau	Belarus	1:02.83	
5	Tucker Dupree	United States	1:04.08	
6	Ignacio Gonzalez	Argentina	1:06.02	
7	Jeremy McClure	Australia	1:06.32	
8	Albert Gelis	Spain	1:06.66	

Q = qualified for final. WR = World Record.
