= Wu Bin =

Wu Bin is the name of the following Chinese people:

- Wu Bin (painter), Ming dynasty painter
- Wu Bin (wushu coach), martial arts coach
- Wu Bin (driver), bus driver who became a folk hero for saving his passengers despite his injuries
- Wu Bin (fencer), Fencer
- Wu Bin (swimmer), Paralympic swimmer
