= Swimming at the 2004 Summer Paralympics – Men's 400 metre freestyle S12 =

Men's 400m Freestyle S12 at the XII Paralympic Games
- Paralympic Swimming
- Venue: Olympic Aquatic Centre
- Dates: 19 September 2004
- Competitors: 13 from 8 nations
- Winning time: 4:11.58

Medalists
1st place, gold medalist(s)		Sergei Punko	Belarus
2nd place, silver medalist(s)		Enrique Floriano	Spain
3rd place, bronze medalist(s)		Raman Makarau	Belarus

The Men's 400 metre freestyle S12 swimming event at the 2004 Summer Paralympics was competed on 19 September. It was won by Sergei Punko, representing Belarus.

== 1st round ==
Qualified for final round

Heat 1

19 Sept. 2004, morning session

Rank	Athlete	Time	Notes
1	Enrique Floriano (ESP)	4:30.01	
2	Dmytro Kuzmin (UKR)	4:37.51	
3	Yoshikazu Sakai (JPN)	4:46.16	
4	Alessandro Serpico (ITA)	4:54.83	
5	Dmitri Kravtsevich (BLR)	5:00.57	
6	Jeremy McClure (AUS)	5:12.70	

Heat 2

19 Sept. 2004, morning session

Rank	Athlete	Time	Notes
1	Sergei Punko (BLR)	4:16.98	
2	Raman Makarau (BLR)	4:30.26	
3	Sergiy Klippert (UKR)	4:36.23	
4	Israel Oliver (ESP)	4:42.31	
5	Kosei Egawa (JPN)	4:58.86	
6	Robert Musiorski (POL)	5:03.88	
7	Kitipong Sribunrueng (THA)	5:42.50	

== Final round ==
19 Sept. 2004, evening session

Rank	Athlete	Time	Notes
1st place, gold medalist(s)	Sergei Punko (BLR)	4:11.58	WR
2nd place, silver medalist(s)	Enrique Floriano (ESP)	4:18.40	
3rd place, bronze medalist(s)	Raman Makarau (BLR)	4:23.19	
4	Dmytro Kuzmin (UKR)	4:30.61	
5	Sergiy Klippert (UKR)	4:34.71	
6	Israel Oliver (ESP)	4:43.00	
7	Yoshikazu Sakai (JPN)	4:44.48	
8	Alessandro Serpico (ITA)	4:52.08	
