= Swimming at the 2008 Summer Paralympics – Men's 100 metre freestyle S13 =

Men's 100m Freestyle S13 at the XIII Paralympic Games
- Venue: Beijing National Aquatics Center
- Dates: 10 September
- Competitors: 16 from 12 nations
- Winning time: 53.37

Medalists
1st place, gold medalist(s)		Charalampos Taiganidis	Greece
2nd place, silver medalist(s)		Oleksii Fedyna	Ukraine
3rd place, bronze medalist(s)		Danylo Chufarov	Ukraine

The men's 100m freestyle S13 event at the 2008 Summer Paralympics took place at the Beijing National Aquatics Center on 10 September. There were two heats; the swimmers with the eight fastest times advanced to the final.

== Results ==
=== Heats ===
Competed from 09:14.

==== Heat 1 ====
Rank	Name	Nationality	Time	Notes
1	Oleksii Fedyna	Ukraine	54.86	Q, PR
2	Carlos Farrenberg	Brazil	54.97	Q
3	Charl Bouwer	South Africa	55.14	Q
4	Daniel Clausner	Germany	55.32	Q
5	Dmytro Aleksyeyev	Ukraine	55.88	
6	Daniel Simon	Germany	57.98	
7	Dave Ellis	Great Britain	58.72	
8	Andrea Palantrani	Italy	1:00.12	

==== Heat 2 ====
Rank	Name	Nationality	Time	Notes
1	Charalampos Taiganidis	Greece	54.96	Q
2	Dzmitry Salei	Belarus	55.12	Q
3	Danylo Chufarov	Ukraine	55.14	Q
4	Andrey Strokin	Russia	55.29	Q
5	Robert Doerries	Germany	57.19	
6	Martin Stepanek	Czech Republic	57.67	
7	Daniel Sharp	New Zealand	58.85	
8	Brian Hill	Canada	59.80	

=== Final ===
Competed at 17:11.

Rank	Name	Nationality	Time	Notes
1st place, gold medalist(s)	Charalampos Taiganidis	Greece	53.37	WR
2nd place, silver medalist(s)	Oleksii Fedyna	Ukraine	54.11	
3rd place, bronze medalist(s)	Danylo Chufarov	Ukraine	54.26	
4	Dzmitry Salei	Belarus	54.67	
5	Carlos Farrenberg	Brazil	54.70	
6	Charl Bouwer	South Africa	54.99	
7	Andrey Strokin	Russia	55.19	
8	Daniel Clausner	Germany	55.54	

Q = qualified for final. WR = World Record. PR = Paralympic Record.
