= Swimming at the 2004 Summer Paralympics – Men's 50 metre freestyle S12 =

Men's 50m Freestyle S12 at the XII Paralympic Games
- Paralympic Swimming
- Venue: Olympic Aquatic Centre
- Dates: 26 September 2004
- Competitors: 12 from 8 nations
- Winning time: 24.80

Medalists
1st place, gold medalist(s)		Dmytro Aleksyeyev	Ukraine
2nd place, silver medalist(s)		Raman Makarau	Belarus
3rd place, bronze medalist(s)		Wu Bin	China

The men's 50 metre freestyle S12 swimming event at the 2004 Summer Paralympics was competed on 26 September. It was won by Dmytro Aleksyeyev, representing Ukraine.

== 1st round ==
Qualified for final round

Heat 1

26 Sept. 2004, morning session

Rank	Athlete	Time	Notes
1	Wu Bin (CHN)	25.69	PR
2	Sergei Punko (BLR)	25.97	
3	Dmytro Kuzmin (UKR)	26.36	
4	Ebert Kleynhans (RSA)	26.68	
5	Sergiy Demchuk (UKR)	26.83	
6	Ziv Better (ISR)	26.89	

Heat 2

26 Sept. 2004, morning session

Rank	Athlete	Time	Notes
1	Raman Makarau (BLR)	25.58	PR
2	Dmytro Aleksyeyev (UKR)	25.74	
3	Darren Leach (GBR)	26.28	
4	Emmanuel Provost (FRA)	26.80	
5	Kosei Egawa (JPN)	26.83	
6	Yury Rudzenok (BLR)	27.49	

== Final round ==
26 Sept. 2004, evening session

Rank	Athlete	Time	Notes
1st place, gold medalist(s)	Dmytro Aleksyeyev (UKR)	24.80	WR
2nd place, silver medalist(s)	Raman Makarau (BLR)	25.27	
3rd place, bronze medalist(s)	Wu Bin (CHN)	25.69	
4	Sergei Punko (BLR)	25.88	
5	Dmytro Kuzmin (UKR)	26.00	
6	Darren Leach (GBR)	26.08	
7	Ebert Kleynhans (RSA)	26.60	
8	Emmanuel Provost (FRA)	26.71	
