= Swimming at the 2008 Summer Paralympics – Men's 200 metre individual medley SM13 =

Men's 200m Individual Medley SM13 at the XIII Paralympic Games
- Venue: Beijing National Aquatics Center
- Dates: 12 September
- Competitors: 15 from 10 nations
- Winning time: 2:13.84

Medalists
1st place, gold medalist(s)		Oleksii Fedyna	Ukraine
2nd place, silver medalist(s)		Charalampos Taiganidis	Greece
3rd place, bronze medalist(s)		Dmytro Aleksyeyev	Ukraine

The men's 200m individual medley SM13 event at the 2008 Summer Paralympics took place at the Beijing National Aquatics Center on 12 September. There were two heats; the swimmers with the eight fastest times advanced to the final.

== Results ==
=== Heats ===
Competed from 10:49.

==== Heat 1 ====
Rank	Name	Nationality	Time	Notes
1	Daniel Clausner	Germany	2:20.30	Q
2	Danylo Chufarov	Ukraine	2:23.28	Q
3	Dervis Konuralp	Great Britain	2:24.03	Q
4	Charalampos Taiganidis	Greece	2:24.19	Q
5	Robert Doerries	Germany	2:26.89	
6	Devin Gotell	Canada	2:31.61	
7	Carlos Farrenberg	Brazil	2:34.19	
8	Luis Antonio Arevalo	Spain	2:36.01	

==== Heat 2 ====
Rank	Name	Nationality	Time	Notes
1	Oleksii Fedyna	Ukraine	2:16.32	Q, WR
2	Dave Ellis	Great Britain	2:20.27	Q
3	Dmytro Aleksyeyev	Ukraine	2:20.39	Q
4	Michel Tielbeke	Netherlands	2:24.47	Q
5	Dzmitry Salei	Belarus	2:24.57	
6	Kevin Mendez	Spain	2:27.75	
7	Martin Stepanek	Czech Republic	2:28.02	

=== Final ===
Competed at 19:38.

Rank	Name	Nationality	Time	Notes
1st place, gold medalist(s)	Oleksii Fedyna	Ukraine	2:13.84	WR
2nd place, silver medalist(s)	Charalampos Taiganidis	Greece	2:16.95	
3rd place, bronze medalist(s)	Dmytro Aleksyeyev	Ukraine	2:17.13	
4	Danylo Chufarov	Ukraine	2:18.07	
5	Daniel Clausner	Germany	2:18.96	
6	Dave Ellis	Great Britain	2:21.22	
7	Dervis Konuralp	Great Britain	2:23.01	
8	Michel Tielbeke	Netherlands	2:25.36	

Q = qualified for final. WR = World Record.
