= Swimming at the 2008 Summer Paralympics – Men's 400 metre freestyle S13 =

Men's 400m Freestyle S13 at the XIII Paralympic Games
- Venue: Beijing National Aquatics Center
- Dates: 8 September
- Competitors: 9 from 7 nations
- Winning time: 4:14.02

Medalists
1st place, gold medalist(s)		Charl Bouwer	South Africa
2nd place, silver medalist(s)		Danylo Chufarov	Ukraine
3rd place, bronze medalist(s)		Charalampos Taiganidis	Greece

The men's 400m freestyle S13 event at the 2008 Summer Paralympics took place at the Beijing National Aquatics Center on 8 September. There were two heats; the swimmers with the eight fastest times advanced to the final.

== Results ==
=== Heats ===
Competed from 09:34.

==== Heat 1 ====
Rank	Name	Nationality	Time	Notes
1	Devin Gotell	Canada	4:29.51	Q
2	Oleksii Fedyna	Ukraine	4:30.48	Q
3	Charalampos Taiganidis	Greece	4:31.17	Q
4	Luis Antonio Arevalo	Spain	4:46.03	

==== Heat 2 ====
Rank	Name	Nationality	Time	Notes
1	Charl Bouwer	South Africa	4:21.58	Q
2	Danylo Chufarov	Ukraine	4:25.48	Q
3	Carlos Farrenberg	Brazil	4:29.45	Q
4	Robert Doerries	Germany	4:34.71	Q
5	Kevin Mendez	Spain	4:35.29	Q

=== Final ===
Competed at 17:36.

Rank	Name	Nationality	Time	Notes
1st place, gold medalist(s)	Charl Bouwer	South Africa	4:14.02	WR
2nd place, silver medalist(s)	Danylo Chufarov	Ukraine	4:14.84	
3rd place, bronze medalist(s)	Charalampos Taiganidis	Greece	4:23.59	
4	Robert Doerries	Germany	4:23.89	
5	Carlos Farrenberg	Brazil	4:27.16	
6	Oleksii Fedyna	Ukraine	4:27.66	
7	Devin Gotell	Canada	4:28.73	
8	Kevin Mendez	Spain	4:33.75	

Q = qualified for final. WR = World Record.
