= Leah Robinson (athlete) =

Canadian Paralympic athlete

Personal information
- Born: 7 November 1993 (age 32) Kitchener, Ontario, Canada
- Height: 1.66 m (5 ft 5 in)
- Weight: 50 kg (110 lb)

Sport
- Country: Canada
- Sport: Paralympic athletics
- Disability: Hemiplegia
- Disability class: T37
- Event(s): 100 metres 200 metres 400 metres
- Club: University of Guelph
- Coached by: Jason Kerr
- Retired: 2017
Medal record
Paralympic athletics
Representing Canada
Parapan American Games
Silver medal – second place	2015 Toronto	400m T37
Bronze medal – third place	2015 Toronto	200m T37

Leah Robinson (born 7 November 1993) is a retired Canadian Paralympic athlete who competed in sprinting events. She is a two-time Parapan American Games medalist and has competed at two Paralympic Games.

Robinson was the youngest member of the Canadian team at the 2008 Summer Paralympics, she was fourteen years old at the time and competed in the 100m T37 and 200m T37 where she finished twelfth and tenth in the semifinals respectively.
