= Swimming at the 2008 Summer Paralympics – Women's 50 metre backstroke S2 =

Women's 50m Backstroke S2 at the XIII Paralympic Games
- Venue: Beijing National Aquatics Center
- Dates: 15 September
- Competitors: 9 from 6 nations
- Winning time: 1:13.64

Medalists
1st place, gold medalist(s)		Ganna Ielisavetska	Ukraine
2nd place, silver medalist(s)		Iryna Sotska	Ukraine
3rd place, bronze medalist(s)		Sara Carracelas	Spain

The women's 50m backstroke S2 event at the 2008 Summer Paralympics took place at the Beijing National Aquatics Center on 15 September. There were two heats; the swimmers with the eight fastest times advanced to the final.

== Results ==
=== Heats ===
Competed from 09:33.

==== Heat 1 ====
Rank	Name	Nationality	Time	Notes
1	Nataliia Semenova	Ukraine	1:23.69	Q
2	Danielle Watts	Great Britain	1:27.50	Q
3	Maria Liaskou	Greece	1:27.90	Q
4	Virginia Hernandez	Mexico	1:41.87	

==== Heat 2 ====
Rank	Name	Nationality	Time	Notes
1	Iryna Sotska	Ukraine	1:17.31	Q, WR
2	Ganna Ielisavetska	Ukraine	1:18.01	Q
3	Sara Carracelas	Spain	1:18.31	Q
4	Maria Kalpakidou	Greece	1:23.59	Q
5	Betiana Basualdo	Argentina	1:35.82	Q

=== Final ===
Competed at 17:11.

Rank	Name	Nationality	Time	Notes
1st place, gold medalist(s)	Ganna Ielisavetska	Ukraine	1:13.64	WR
2nd place, silver medalist(s)	Iryna Sotska	Ukraine	1:15.53	
3rd place, bronze medalist(s)	Sara Carracelas	Spain	1:16.33	
4	Nataliia Semenova	Ukraine	1:23.85	
5	Maria Liaskou	Greece	1:24.24	
6	Maria Kalpakidou	Greece	1:25.56	
7	Danielle Watts	Great Britain	1:27.28	
8	Betiana Basualdo	Argentina	1:40.14	

Q = qualified for final. WR = World Record. PR = Paralympic Record.
