= Athletics at the 2008 Summer Paralympics – Men's discus throw F11–12 =

The Men's Discus Throw F12/11 had its Final held on September 13 at 9:20.

== Medalists ==
Gold	Vasyl Lishchynskyi; Ukraine
Silver	Sebastian Baldassarri; Argentina
Bronze	Oleksandr Iasynovyi; Ukraine

== Results ==
Place	Athlete	Class	1	2	3	4	5	6	Best	Points
1	Vasyl Lishchynskyi (UKR)	F11	x	36.94	36.66	37.87	29.63	40.59	40.59	991
2	Sebastian Baldassarri (ARG)	F11	35.36	36.62	37.20	37.67	40.43	36.55	40.43	988
3	Oleksandr Iasynovyi (UKR)	F12	47.08	46.30	48.85	49.52	x	49.12	49.52	974
4	Vladimir Andryushchenko (RUS)	F12	47.32	49.49	x	49.41	49.08	46.59	49.49	974
5	David Casinos (ESP)	F11	x	38.85	x	x	x	x	38.85	949
6	Bil Marinkovic (AUT)	F11	30.45	35.81	33.83	x	36.14	37.24	37.24	910
7	Rolandas Urbonas (LTU)	F12	43.34	41.31	44.41	44.07	33.86	44.07	44.41	874
8	Yury Buchkou (BLR)	F12	41.00	43.43	x	42.39	42.17	41.86	43.43	855
9	Volodymyr Piddubnyy (UKR)	F11	33.01	31.80	x				33.01	806
10	Siarhei Hrybanau (BLR)	F12	30.21	x	x				30.21	594
