= Wuxi bus accident =

2012 motor vehicle accident in China

The Wuxi bus accident occurred on May 29, 2012 when an intercity bus travelling from Wuxi to Hangzhou in China was struck by a piece of iron. The driver, Wu Bin, suffered lethal injuries but managed to control the bus and help passengers leave the vehicle. He was posthumously praised for his efforts.

== Event ==
On May 29, 2012, when Wu was driving a bus from Wuxi to Hangzhou on an expressway, a piece of iron broke through the glass and hit his abdomen and arm. Though lacerating his liver and causing a bone fracture, he still managed to safely stop the bus. Then, he helped passengers leave the bus, warning them to be careful of the passing cars. Wu was quickly sent to a hospital but he died on June 1.

== Investigation ==
The Wuxi police confirmed that the piece of iron which hit Wu was part of a brake pad of a red Dongfeng Motor truck and announced that the event was an accident. The police later found the truck and took parts away for further investigation, but did not arrest the truck driver. Legal opinion differs as to whether the truck driver has any criminal or civil liability in this case.

== Social reaction ==
After Wu died, he was treated with honor and his family received 100 thousand RMB from the government. Zhao Hongzhu, the lead of CPC Zhejiang branch, also went to his home to give condolences. Many common people were touched by his actions as well. On June 4, 2012, thousands of Hangzhou citizens attended his funeral and gave him their best wishes.

He joined several previous "common people" who become instant, sensational national heroes (such as "most beautiful teacher" Zhang Lili or "most beautiful mother" Wu Juping) due to acts of self-sacrifice that show dedication towards one's job, people in need and society. An article by Xinhua News Agency claimed that this is "the age of commoner heroes". An article by Thinking Chinese suggested that these new heroes become so popular because they represent an intersection between "reality culture" and "traditional values", and between the interests of the government and the emotional chords of modern society.

== See also ==
- Foreign object damage
