= Oleksandr Iasynovyi =

Ukrainian Paralympic athlete (born 1966)

Medal record

Paralympic athletics

Representing Ukraine

Paralympic Games
Gold medal – first place	2000 Sydney	Discus Throw - F13
Silver medal – second place	2000 Sydney	Shot Put - F13
Bronze medal – third place	2008 Beijing	Discus Throw - F11-12

IPC Athletics World Championships
Gold medal – first place	2011 Christchurch	Discus Throw F12

Oleksandr Iasynovyi (Ukrainian: Олександр Борисович Ясиновий; born Aug 4, 1966) is a visually impaired Paralympic athlete from Ukraine. He competes in throwing events, specialising in discus.

At the 2000 Summer Paralympics in Sydney, he competed in the F13 classification. He won a silver medal in shot put. In the F13 discus event he won gold, and set an F13 world record that still stands 12 years later.

Following deterioration of his vision, Iasynovyi competed in the F12 classification at the 2008 Summer Paralympics in Beijing. There, he won a bronze medal in the men's F11-12 discus throw event. At the 2011 IPC Athletics World Championships, Iasynovyi won gold in the Men's F12 discus event.
