= Charalampos Taiganidis =

Greek Paralympic swimmer

Personal information
- Nationality: Greece
- Born: March 11, 1981 (age 45) Thessaloniki, Greece

Sport
- Sport: Swimming
- Strokes: Backstroke, butterfly, freestyle, individual medley
Medal record
Men's swimming
Paralympic Games
Gold medal – first place	2004 Athens	100 m backstroke S13
Gold medal – first place	2004 Athens	100 m butterfly S13
Gold medal – first place	2008 Beijing	100 m backstroke S13
Gold medal – first place	2008 Beijing	100 m freestyle S13
Silver medal – second place	2004 Athens	50 m freestyle S13
Silver medal – second place	2008 Beijing	100 m butterfly S13
Silver medal – second place	2008 Beijing	50 m freestyle S13
Silver medal – second place	2008 Beijing	200 m medley SM13
Bronze medal – third place	2008 Beijing	400 m freestyle S13
Bronze medal – third place	2012 London	100 m backstroke S13

Charalampos Taiganidis (Greek: Χαράλαμπος Ταϊγανίδης) is a Greek Paralympic swimming champion, Paralympic gold medalist and multiple medal-winner with a total of 10 Paralympic medals (4 gold, 4 silver and 2 bronze) he holds the record among Greek Paralympic athletes. He was a former S13 swimmer and now competes in the S12 class. He has competed in five consecutive Paralympic games: Athens 2004, Beijing 2008, London 2012, Rio de Janeiro 2016, Tokyo 2020 and has won medals in three of them (2004, 2008 and 2012).

He was awarded as the Best Greek male athlete with a disability for 2004, 2006 and 2008.
