= Alexander Nevolin-Svetov =

Russian Paralympic swimmer

Medal record

Swimming

Representing Russia

Paralympic Games
Gold medal – first place	2008 Beijing	100 metre backstroke - S12
Gold medal – first place	2012 London	100 metre backstroke - S12
Silver medal – second place	2008 Beijing	Men's 50 metre freestyle S12
Silver medal – second place	2008 Beijing	200m individual medley - SM12
Silver medal – second place	2012 London	200m individual medley - SM12
Silver medal – second place	2012 London	Men's 100 metre freestyle S12
Silver medal – second place	2012 London	Men's 50 metre freestyle S12
Bronze medal – third place	2008 Beijing	100 metre freestyle - S12

IPC European Championships
Silver medal – second place	2009 Reykjavik	100 m freestyle – S12
Silver medal – second place	2009 Reykjavik	100 m backstroke – S12

Alexander Svetov-Nevolin is a paralympic swimmer from Russia competing mainly in category S12 events.

== Career ==
Alexander travelled with Russian Paralympic team to Beijing for the 2008 Summer Paralympics. There he won a bronze medal in the 100m freestyle, silver behind Ukrainian Maksym Veraksa who set world records in both the 50m freestyle and 200m individual medley and broke the world record himself in winning the 100m backstroke.

In October 2014 Russian newspaper Sovershenno Sekretno published an article claiming that Alexander's paralympic status is falsified. The article included a copy of Alexander's driving license, a copy of a police car incident report listing Nevolin-Svetlov as the driver, and the details of a 2013 bribery case against an ophthalmologist allegedly requesting a bribe from Nevolin-Svetlov for confirming the paralympic status.
