= Wu Bin (swimmer) =

Chinese Paralympic swimmer

Medal record

Swimming

Representing China

Paralympic Games
Bronze medal – third place	2004 Athens	Men's 50 metre freestyle - S12

Wu Bin is a Chinese paralympic swimmer. He won the bronze medal in the Men's 50 metre freestyle - S12 event at the 2004 Summer Paralympics in Athens.
