= Tahlia Rotumah =

Australian Paralympic athlete (born 1992)

Personal information
- Nationality: Australia
- Born: 24 February 1992 (age 34)
Medal record
Athletics
FESPIC Games
Silver medal – second place	2006 FESPIC Games	Women's 100 m
Silver medal – second place	2006 FESPIC Games	Women's 200 m

Tahlia Rotumah (born 24 February 1992) is the first female Indigenous Australian Paralympian, of the Minjungbal nation, and is also a South Sea Islander.

Rotumah was born with hemiplegia and cerebral palsy. In 2001 Tahlia Rotumah received an Encouragement award for Junior Sporting Achievements at the Many Rivers Regional Council NAIDOC Week Community Achievement Awards.

Rotumah won silver medals in the 100m and 200m sprints at the 2006 Far East and South Pacific Games (FESPIC) held in Kuala Lumpur. At the age of 16, she competed in athletics at the 2008 Summer Paralympics in Beijing, where she shaved one-tenth of a second off her personal best in the 100m, but didn't qualify for the finals in either of the 100m or 200m events that she competed in.

Rotumah was nominated for the 2008 Deadlys award "Most Promising New Talent in Sport", and was awarded 'Miss NAIDOC' in 2010.
