= Megan Muscat =

Canadian para athlete

Personal information
- Born: 4 July 1985 (age 40) St. Thomas, Ontario, Canada

Sport
- Sport: Paralympic athletics
- Disability class: T37
- Retired: 2013
Medal record
Representing Canada
Parapan American Games
Bronze medal – third place	2007 Rio de Janeiro	200m T38

Megan Muscat (born 4 July 1985) is a Canadian retired Paralympic athlete who competed at international track and field competitions. She is a Parapan American Games bronze medalist and competed at the 2008 Summer Paralympics and 2010 Commonwealth Games. She holds the Canadian record in the long jump in her sport category.

Muscat started training in Paralympic athletics in 2000 at Central Elgin High School and trained with the Windsor Lancers.
