= Enrique Floriano Millan =

Spanish Paralympic swimmer

Enrique Floriano
Personal information
- Full name: Enrique Floriano Millan
- Nationality: Spanish
- Born: 9 October 1982 (age 43) Lorca, Murcia, Spain

Sport
- Sport: Swimming
Medal record
Men's swimming
Representing Spain
Paralympic Games
Gold medal – first place	2000 Sydney	200m ind. medley SM13
Gold medal – first place	2000 Sydney	400m freestyle S13
Silver medal – second place	2000 Sydney	100m backstroke S13
Silver medal – second place	2004 Athens	400m freestyle S12
Silver medal – second place	2004 Athens	400m freestyle S12
Silver medal – second place	2012 London	400m freestyle S12
Bronze medal – third place	2000 Sydney	4x100m medlay relay S11-13
Bronze medal – third place	2008 Beijing	400m freestyle S12
IPC World Championships
Silver medal – second place	2010 Eindhoven	5km open water S11-13
Silver medal – second place	2010 Eindhoven	4x100m freestyle relay 49pts
IPC World Championships 25m
Silver medal – second place	2009 Rio de Janeiro	400m freestyle S12
Silver medal – second place	2009 Rio de Janeiro	200m ind. medley SM12
Silver medal – second place	2009 Rio de Janeiro	4x100m freestyle relay 49pts
Silver medal – second place	2009 Rio de Janeiro	4x100m medley relay 49pts
IPC European Championships
Silver medal – second place	2009 Reykjavik	100m breaststroke SB12
Silver medal – second place	2009 Reykjavik	400m freestyle S12

Enrique Floriano Millan (born 9 October 1982 in Lorca, Murcia) is a vision impaired B2/S12 swimmer from Spain.

== Personal ==
Floriano is from the Extremadura region of Spain. Floriano got a job with help from the Employment HPOD PROAD Program, which is helped by ONCE. In October 2013, he was awarded the Real Orden al Mérito Deportivo.

== Swimming ==
In 2007, Floriano competed at the IDM German Open. He competed at the 2000 Summer Paralympics, winning a gold medal in the 400 meter freestyle and 200 meter individual medley race, and a silver medal in the 100 meter backstroke race. He also won a bronze in the 4 x 100 meter medley Relay 49 Points race. He competed at the 2004 Summer Paralympics, winning a silver medal in the 400 meter freestyle and in the 4 x 100 meter medley Relay 49 Points race, and a bronze medal in the 200 meter individual medley race. He competed at the 2008 Summer Paralympics, winning a silver medal 400 meter freestyle race. He competed at the 2012 Summer Paralympics, winning a silver medal in the 400 meter freestyle race. Prior to heading to London, she participated in a national vision impaired swim team training camp at the High Performance Centre of Sant Cugat from 6 to 23 August. Daily at the camp, there were two in water training sessions and one out of water training session. In 2010, he swam at the Tenerife International Open. He raced at the 2011 IPC European Swimming Championships in Berlin, Germany. Twice, he was one of the top three swimmers in his races. He finished first in the 5 km open water swim.
