= Dmytro Aleksyeyev =

Ukrainian Paralympic swimmer

Medal record

Swimming

Representing Ukraine

Paralympic Games
Gold medal – first place	2004 Athens	50 metre freestyle - S12
Gold medal – first place	2004 Athens	100 metre breaststroke - SB12
Gold medal – first place	2004 Athens	4x100 metre freestyle - 49 pts
Gold medal – first place	2004 Athens	4x100 metre medley - 49 pts
Silver medal – second place	2004 Athens	100 metre freestyle - S12
Bronze medal – third place	2008 Beijing	100 metre backstroke - S13
Bronze medal – third place	2008 Beijing	200m individual medley - SM13

World Championships
Gold medal – first place	2002 Mar del Plata	50 m freestyle S12
Gold medal – first place	2006 Durban	4x100 m freestyle 49 pts
Silver medal – second place	2002 Mar del Plata	100 m backstroke S12
Silver medal – second place	2006 Durban	50 m freestyle S12
Silver medal – second place	2006 Durban	100 m breaststroke SB12
Bronze medal – third place	2006 Durban	100 m backstroke S12

IPC European Championships
Silver medal – second place	2009 Reykjavik	50 m freestyle S13
Silver medal – second place	2009 Reykjavik	100 m backstroke S13
Bronze medal – third place	2009 Reykjavik	100 m freestyle S13

Dmytro Aleksyeyev (Ukrainian: Дмитро Алексєєв) is a Paralympic swimmer from Ukraine competing mainly in category S13 events.

Dmytro was part of the Ukrainian Paralympic games swimming team on two occasions, firstly in 2004 then again in 2008 winning a total of seven medals including four golds. All his golds came in 2004 where he won the 50m freestyle in a new world record, the 100m breaststroke and being part of both the 4 × 100 m freestyle and medley teams that broke world records, he also finished second behind Belarusian Raman Makarau in the 100m freestyle and finished fourth in the 100m backstroke. In the 2008 games he finished third in both the 100m backstroke and 200m individual medley and finished sixth in the 50m freestyle, eighth in the 100m freestyle and failed to make the 100m butterfly final having finished fifth in his heat.
