= Viktoriya Kravchenko =

Ukrainian Paralympic athlete (born 1979)

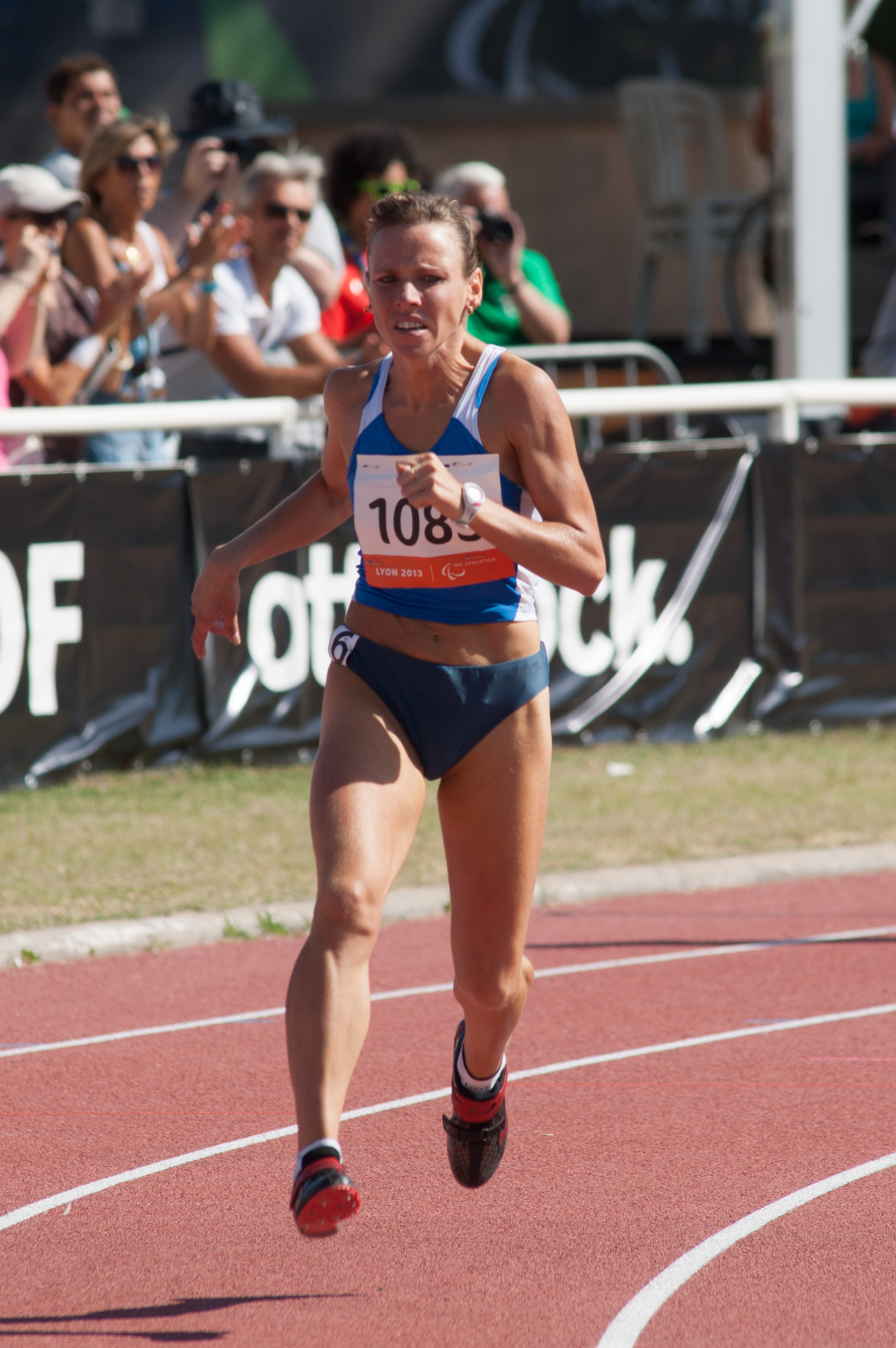
- Kravchenko at the 2013 IPC Athletics World Championships

Medal record

Women's para athletics (T37)

Representing Ukraine

Paralympic Games
Silver medal – second place	2008 Beijing	100m – T37
Silver medal – second place	2008 Beijing	200m – T37

Viktoriya Kravchenko (Ukrainian: Вікторія Кравченко) (born 18 January 1979) is a Paralympian athlete from Ukraine competing mainly in category T37 sprint events.

She competed in the 2008 Summer Paralympics in Beijing, China. There she won a silver medal in the women's 100 metres – T37 event and a silver medal in the women's 200 metres – T37 event
