= Sergey Punko =

Belarusian Paralympic swimmer

Personal information
- Nationality: Russian
- Born: 10 January 1981 (age 45) Navapolatsk, Belarus

Sport
- Sport: Swimming
- Club: Youth of Moscow
- Coach: Vadim Labokha; Sergey Zhilkin
Medal record
Event	1st	2nd	3rd
Paralympic Games	4	6	3
World Championships	7	7	2
European Championships	2	3	1
Men's swimming
Representing Belarus
Paralympic Games
Gold medal – first place	2004 Athens	400 m freestyle S12
Gold medal – first place	2004 Athens	200 m individual medley SM12
Gold medal – first place	2008 Beijing	400 m freestyle S12
Silver medal – second place	2004 Athens	100 m butterfly S12
Silver medal – second place	2004 Athens	4x100 m freestyle relay 49pts
Silver medal – second place	2004 Athens	100 m breaststroke SB12
Silver medal – second place	2008 Beijing	100 m butterfly S12
Silver medal – second place	2008 Beijing	100 m breaststroke SB12
Bronze medal – third place	2004 Athens	100 m freestyle S12
Bronze medal – third place	2004 Athens	4x100 m medley relay 49pts
IPC World Championships
Gold medal – first place	2006 Durban	400m Freestyle S12
Gold medal – first place	2006 Durban	200m Individual Medley SM12
Gold medal – first place	2006 Durban	100m Breaststroke S12
Gold medal – first place	2006 Durban	5km Open water
Silver medal – second place	2006 Durban	100m Freestyle S12
Silver medal – second place	2006 Durban	100m Butterfly S12
Silver medal – second place	2006 Durban	4x100m Freestyle relay 49pts
Silver medal – second place	2006 Durban	4x100m Medley relay 49pts
Representing Russia
Paralympic Games
Gold medal – first place	2012 London	400 m freestyle S12
Silver medal – second place	2012 London	100 m butterfly S12
Bronze medal – third place	2012 London	200 m individual medley SM12
IPC World Championships
Gold medal – first place	2010 Eindhoven	400m Freestyle S12
Gold medal – first place	2010 Eindhoven	4x100m Medley relay 49pts
Gold medal – first place	2010 Eindhoven	5km Open water S11-13
Silver medal – second place	2010 Eindhoven	200m Individual medley SM12
Silver medal – second place	2010 Eindhoven	100m Butterfly S12
Silver medal – second place	2013 Montreal	400m Freestyle S12
Bronze medal – third place	2010 Eindhoven	100m Freestyle S12
Bronze medal – third place	2013 Montreal	100m Breaststroke SB12
IPC European Championships
Gold medal – first place	2009 Eindhoven	400m Freestyle S12
Gold medal – first place	2009 Eindhoven	100m Breaststroke S12
Silver medal – second place	2009 Eindhoven	100m Butterfly S12
Silver medal – second place	2009 Eindhoven	200m Individual medley S12
Silver medal – second place	2014 Eindhoven	400m Freestyle S12
Bronze medal – third place	2016 Funchal	400m Freestyle S13

Sergey Punko (also spelled Sergei; born 10 January 1981 in Navapolatsk) is a formerly Belarusian, now Russian, Paralympic swimmer. He was born with a progressive eye disease, but had normal sight as a child. He started swimming at age 10, and competed nationally and internationally in able-bodied competition until he was 21. By that time, he had less than 5% vision. Classified S12, he began swimming in disability meets in 2002. He quickly broke long-standing world records, and was named World Disabled Swimmer of the Year in 2003.

Up to the 2012 Paralympic Games he has won four gold, six silver and three bronze medals. At the 2012 Summer Paralympics, he won a gold and silver medals for Russia.

In February 2013, Punko held S12 long course world records in 200, 400 and 800 metre freestyle and 200 metre butterfly events.
