= Oleksii Fedyna =

Ukrainian Paralympic swimmer

Personal information
- Born: 8 October 1987 (age 38)
Medal record
Men's para swimming
Representing Ukraine
Paralympic Games
Gold medal – first place	2008 Beijing	50 m freestyle S13
Gold medal – first place	2008 Beijing	100 m breaststroke SB13
Gold medal – first place	2008 Beijing	200 m medley SM13
Gold medal – first place	2012 London	100 m breaststroke SB13
Gold medal – first place	2016 Rio	100 m breaststroke SB13
Silver medal – second place	2008 Beijing	100 m backstroke S13
Silver medal – second place	2008 Beijing	100 m freestyle S13
Bronze medal – third place	2012 London	50 m freestyle S13
World Championships
Gold medal – first place	2010 Eindhoven	100m breaststroke SB13
Gold medal – first place	2015 Glasgow	100 m breaststroke SB12
Silver medal – second place	2010 Eindhoven	50m freestyle S13
Silver medal – second place	2010 Eindhoven	4×100m medley 49pts
Silver medal – second place	2022 Madeira	100 m breaststroke SB12
Silver medal – second place	2023 Manchester	100 m breaststroke SB12
Bronze medal – third place	2010 Eindhoven	200m medley SM13
Bronze medal – third place	2025 Singapore	100m breaststroke SB13
European Championships
Gold medal – first place	2009 Reykjavik	50 m freestyle S13
Gold medal – first place	2009 Reykjavik	100 m freestyle S13
Gold medal – first place	2009 Reykjavik	100 m backstroke S13
Gold medal – first place	2009 Reykjavik	200 m medley SM13
Gold medal – first place	2009 Reykjavik	100 m breaststroke SB13
Gold medal – first place	2014 Eindhoven	100m breaststroke SB12
Gold medal – first place	2016 Funchal	100 m breaststroke SB12
Silver medal – second place	2016 Funchal	50m freestyle S13

Oleksii Fedyna (Ukrainian: Олексій Михайлович Федина; born 8 October 1987) is a visually impaired Paralympic swimmer from Ukraine competing in S13 events. He is a Paralympic champion in Beijing, London and Rio de Janeiro, three times in the 100-meter breaststroke. Four-time world champion at the distance of 100 meters breaststroke.

== Career ==
Oleksii competed in seven events at the 2008 Summer Paralympics in Beijing winning five medals, three of them gold. He made the final, but missed out on medals in the 100m butterfly and 400m freestyle, he also won silver medals in both the 100m backstroke and freestyle, on both occasions behind Greece's Charalampos Taiganidis who set world records in both events, his gold medals came in the 50m freestyle, 100m breaststroke and 200m medley setting world records in each of the events in the process.

He is a former IPC world record holder for his classification for the 50 metres freestyle and 100 metres breaststroke events.
