= Serhiy Klippert =

Ukrainian Paralympic swimmer

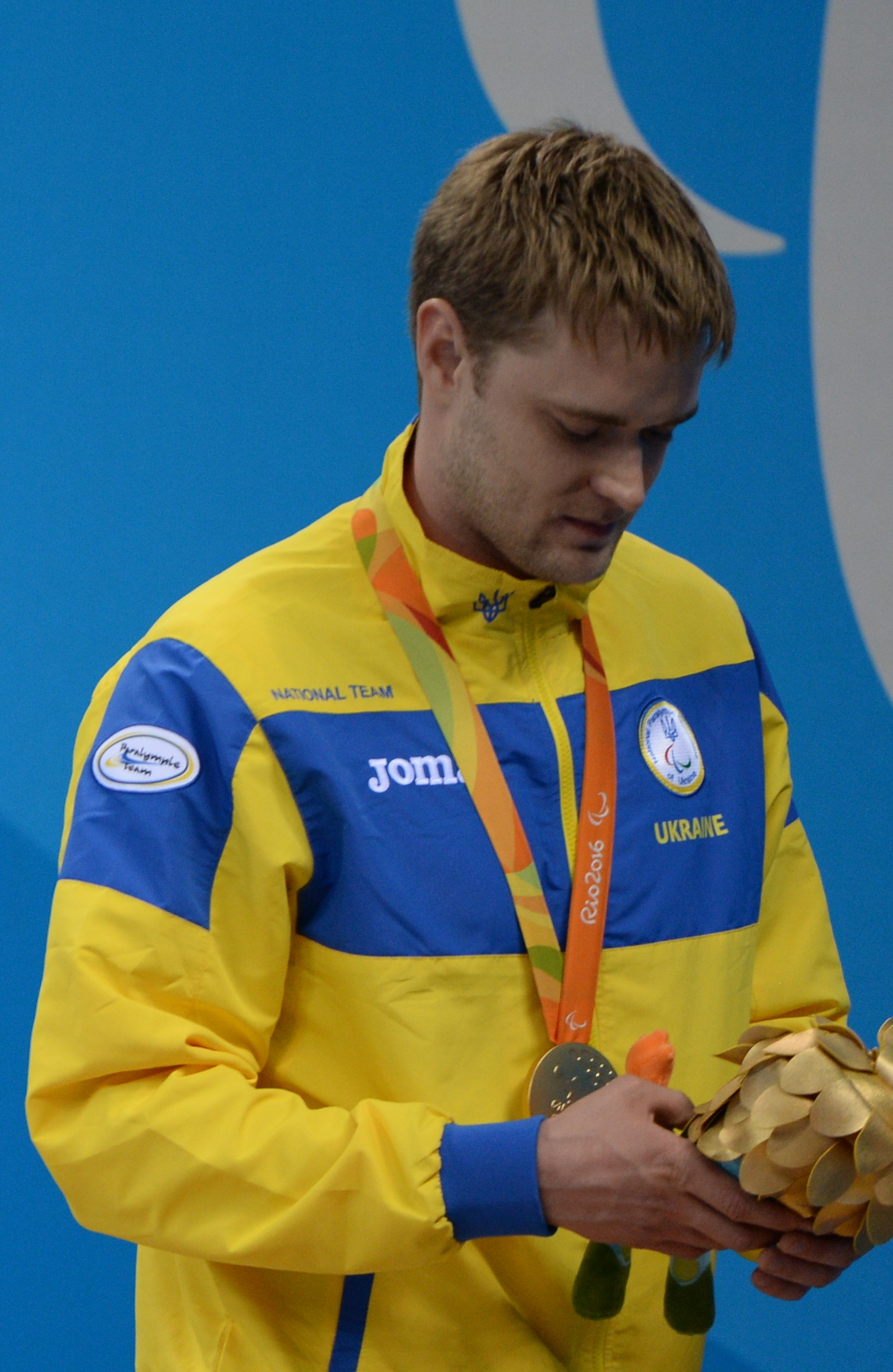
- Sergii Klippert Swimming at the 2016 Summer Paralympics – Men's 100 metre backstroke S12

Personal information
- Nationality: Ukrainian
- Born: 31 March 1989 (age 37)

Sport
- Sport: Swimming
Medal record
Men's para swimming
Representing Ukraine
Paralympic Games
Gold medal – first place	2004 Athens	4x100 metre freestyle - 49 points
Gold medal – first place	2004 Athens	4x100 metre medley - 49 points
Gold medal – first place	2016 Rio	100 metre backstroke - S12
Silver medal – second place	2004 Athens	100 metre backstroke - S12
Silver medal – second place	2008 Beijing	100 metre backstroke - S12
Silver medal – second place	2008 Beijing	100 metre freestyle - S12
Silver medal – second place	2020 Tokyo	100 metre backstroke - S12
Bronze medal – third place	2008 Beijing	4x60 metre relay - S12
Bronze medal – third place	2008 Beijing	100 metre breaststroke - SB12
Bronze medal – third place	2008 Beijing	200m individual medley - SM12
Bronze medal – third place	2008 Beijing	400 metre freestyle - S12
Bronze medal – third place	2012 London	400m metre freestyle - S12
IPC Swimming World Championships
Gold medal – first place	2006 Durban	4x100 m freestyle 49 pts
Gold medal – first place	2006 Durban	4x100 m medley 49 pts
Silver medal – second place	2006 Durban	400 freestyle S12
Silver medal – second place	2006 Durban	200 medley SM12
Silver medal – second place	2015 Glasgow	100 m backstroke (S12)
IPC European Championships
Gold medal – first place	2016 Funchal	100 m backstroke – S12

Sergii Klippert (born 31 March 1989) is a Paralympic swimmer from Ukraine competing mainly in category S12 events.

== Swimming career ==
Klippert has competed at three Paralympic games, in 2004, 2008 and 2012, winning a total of ten medals including two gold. In the 2004 games he competed in the 100m breaststroke, 200m individual medley and 400m freestyle as well as winning silver in the 100m backstroke behind Belarusian Raman Makarau who set a new Paralympic games record he was also part of the Ukrainian teams that won the 4 × 100 m freestyle and 4 × 100 m medley gold medals, both in world record times. In Beijing in 2008 he finished fourth in the 100m butterfly as well as finishing second in the 100m freestyle behind his compatriot Maksym Veraksa who won in a new world record time. He also finished second in the 100m backstroke behind world record breaker Alexander Nevolin-Svetov of Russia, he then finished behind both Maksym and Alexander in the 50m freestyle and 200m medley and picked up further bronzes in the 400m freestyle and 100m breaststroke.
