= Albert Gelis =

Spanish Paralympic swimmer

Personal information
- Full name: Albert Gelis Juanola
- Nationality: Spanish
- Born: 26 October 1981 (age 44) Sant Joan les Fonts, Girona

Sport
- Country: Spain
- Sport: Swimming (S12)
Medal record
Men's para swimming
Representing Spain
Paralympic Games
Bronze medal – third place	2004 Athens	Men's 4 x 100 meter 49 Points Medley Relay
World Championships
Gold medal – first place	2025 Singapore	100 m backstroke S11
Silver medal – second place	2025 Singapore	Mixed 4×100 m medley relay 49pts
European Championships
Gold medal – first place	2026 Kocaeli	100 m backstroke S11
Bronze medal – third place	2009 Reykjavik	100 m butterfly S12
Bronze medal – third place	2009 Reykjavik	100 m backstroke S12

Albert Gelis Juanola (born 26 October 1981) is a vision-impaired S12 swimmer from Spain.

== Personal ==
Gelis was born on 26 October 1981 in Sant Joan les Fonts, Girona. He is from the Catalan region of Spain.

== Swimming ==
Gelis is a vision impaired S12 swimmer. He competed at the 2004 Summer Paralympics, 2008 Summer Paralympics and 2012 Summer Paralympics. He earned a silver medal at the 2004 Games in the 4 x 100 meter 49 Points Medley Relay. In 2007, he competed at the IDM German Open. From the Catalan region of Spain, he was a recipient of a 2012 Plan ADO scholarship. Prior to heading to London for the 2012 Games, he participated in a national vision impaired swim team training camp at the High Performance Centre of Sant Cugat from 6 to 23 August. Daily at the camp, there were two in water training sessions and one out of water training session.
