= Daniel Simon (swimmer) =

German Paralympic swimmer

Personal information
- Born: 16 November 1988 (age 37) Darmstadt, Germany
- Height: 185 cm (6 ft 1 in)

Sport
- Country: Germany
- Sport: Paralympic swimming
- Disability: Stargardt's disease
- Disability class: S13
Medal record
Paralympic swimming
Representing Germany
World Championships (SC)
Gold medal – first place	2009 Rio de Janeiro	Men's 50m freestyle S13
Silver medal – second place	2009 Rio de Janeiro	Men's 100m backstroke S13
Silver medal – second place	2009 Rio de Janeiro	Men's 100m butterfly S13
European Championships
Bronze medal – third place	2009 Reykjavik	Men's 50m freestyle S13
Bronze medal – third place	2009 Reykjavik	Men's 100m butterfly S13
Bronze medal – third place	2011 Berlin	Men's 50m freestyle S13

Daniel Simon (born 16 November 1988) is a German Paralympic swimmer who competes in international level events. He is a World champion and triple European bronze medalist, he has competed at the Paralympic Games three times.
