= Raman Makarau =

Belarusian Paralympic swimmer

Medal record

Swimming

Representing Belarus

Paralympic Games
Gold medal – first place	2008 Beijing	Men's 100 m butterfly S12
Silver medal – second place	2004 Athens	Men's 50 m freestyle S12

Raman Makarau is a Belarusian paralympic swimmer. He won the silver medal in the Men's 50 metre freestyle - S12 event at the 2004 Summer Paralympics in Athens.
