= Spain at the 2008 Summer Paralympics =

- IPC code: ESP
- NPC: Spanish Paralympic Committee
- Website: www.paralimpicos.es (in Spanish)

in Beijing
- Competitors: 133 in 15 sports
- Flag bearer: David Casinos
- Officials: 231
- Medals Ranked 10th: Gold 15 Silver 21 Bronze 22 Total 58

Summer Paralympics appearances (overview)
- 1968; 1972; 1976; 1980; 1984; 1988; 1992; 1996; 2000; 2004; 2008; 2012; 2016; 2020; 2024

Spain sent a delegation to compete at the 2008 Summer Paralympics in Beijing. The country's delegation consisted of 232 people, including 133 athletes competing in 15 sports. Attending the opening ceremony on September 6 was Infanta Elena, President of the Spanish Paralympic Committee Miguel Carballeda, Minister Mercedes Cabrera, and several representatives from the Madrid Olympic Games Bidding Committee.

== Medals ==
Medal	Name	Sport	Event
Gold	David Casinos	Athletics	Men's shot put F11–12
Gold	Christian Venge; David Llaurado	Cycling	Men's time trial B&VI 1–3
Gold	Javier Otxoa	Cycling	Men's time trial CP3
Gold	Cesar Neira	Cycling	Men's time trial CP4
Gold	Maria del Carmen Herrera	Judo	Women's 70 kg
Gold	Enhamed Enhamed	Swimming	Men's 50m freestyle S11
Gold	Enhamed Enhamed	Swimming	Men's 100m freestyle S11
Gold	Richard Oribe	Swimming	Men's 200m freestyle S4
Gold	Jesús Collado	Swimming	Men's 400m freestyle S9
Gold	Enhamed Enhamed	Swimming	Men's 400m freestyle S11
Gold	Ricardo Ten	Swimming	Men's 100m breaststroke SB4
Gold	Enhamed Enhamed	Swimming	Men's 100m butterfly S11
Gold	Maria Teresa Perales	Swimming	Women's 50m freestyle S5
Gold	Maria Teresa Perales	Swimming	Women's 100m freestyle S5
Gold	Maria Teresa Perales	Swimming	Women's 200m freestyle S5
Silver	Abderrahman Ait Khamouch	Athletics	Men's 1500m T46
Silver	Yolanda Martín; Santiago Pesquera; José Manuel Rodríguez Vazquez	Boccia	Pairs BC3
Silver	José Vicente Arzo	Cycling	Men's time trial HC C
Silver	Juan José Méndez Fernández	Cycling	Men's time trial LC4
Silver	Javier Otxoa	Cycling	Men's road race LC3-4/CP3
Silver	Christian Venge; David Llaurado	Cycling	Men's individual pursuit B&VI 1–3
Silver	Roberto Alcaide	Cycling	Men's individual pursuit LC2
Silver	Marta Arce	Judo	Women's 63 kg
Silver	Richard Oribe	Swimming	Men's 50m freestyle S4
Silver	Richard Oribe	Swimming	Men's 100m freestyle S4
Silver	Sebastián Rodríguez	Swimming	Men's 200m freestyle S5
Silver	Enrique Floriano	Swimming	Men's 400m freestyle S12
Silver	Vicente Gil	Swimming	Men's 50m breaststroke SB3
Silver	David Julian Levecq	Swimming	Men's 100m butterfly S10
Silver	Vicente Javier Torres	Swimming	Men's 150m individual medley SM4
Silver	Jordi Gordillo; Richard Oribe; Sebastián Rodríguez; Daniel Vidal	Swimming	Men's 4 × 50 m freestyle relay
Silver	Maria Teresa Perales	Swimming	Women's 50m backstroke S5
Silver	Sarai Gascon	Swimming	Women's 100m breaststroke SB9
Silver	Sandra Gomez	Swimming	Women's 100m breaststroke SB12
Silver	Ana Garcia-Arcicollar	Swimming	Women's 100m butterfly S12
Silver	José Manuel Ruiz Reyes; Jorge Cardona	Table tennis	Men's team C9-10
Bronze	Abderrahman Ait Khamouch	Athletics	Men's 800m T46
Bronze	Ignacio Avila	Athletics	Men's 1500m T46
Bronze	Javier Porras	Athletics	Men's triple jump F11
Bronze	Eva Ngui	Athletics	Women's 100m T12
Bronze	Eva Ngui	Athletics	Women's 200m T12
Bronze	Manuel Ángel Martín	Boccia	Mixed individual BC2
Bronze	Francisco Javier Beltrán; Pedro Cordero; Manuel Ángel Martín; José Vaquerizo	Boccia	Team BC1-2
Bronze	Roberto Alcaide	Cycling	Men's time trial LC2
Bronze	Cesar Neira	Cycling	Men's individual pursuit LC4
Bronze	Juan José Méndez Fernández	Cycling	Men's individual pursuit LC4
Bronze	Maria Monica Merenciano	Judo	Women's 57 kg
Bronze	Sebastián Rodríguez	Swimming	Men's 50m freestyle S5
Bronze	Miguel Luque	Swimming	Men's 50m breaststroke SB3
Bronze	Alejandro Sánchez	Swimming	Men's 100m breaststroke SB8
Bronze	Pablo Cimadevila	Swimming	Men's 200m individual medley SM5
Bronze	Pablo Cimadevila; Vicente Gil; Sebastián Rodríguez; Daniel Vidal	Swimming	Men's 4 × 50 m medley relay
Bronze	Deborah Font	Swimming	Women's 50m freestyle S12
Bronze	Sara Carracelas	Swimming	Women's 50m backstroke S2
Bronze	Esther Morales	Swimming	Women's 100m backstroke S10
Bronze	Maria Teresa Perales	Swimming	Women's 100m breaststroke SB4
Bronze	Tomas Piñas	Table tennis	Men's singles C3
Bronze	Álvaro Valera	Table tennis	Men's singles C7

== Sports ==
=== Archery ===
==== Men ====
Athlete	Event	Ranking round		Round of 32	Round of 16	Quarterfinals	Semifinals	Finals	
Athlete	Event	Score	Seed	Opposition score	Opposition score	Opposition score	Opposition score	Opposition score	Rank
Manuel Candela	Men's individual recurve W1/W2	582	17	Ozen (TUR); L 87–96	Did not advance				
Jose Manuel Marin	Men's individual recurve W1/W2	557	24	Jung Y J (KOR); L 88–102	Did not advance				
Antonio Sanchez	Men's individual recurve standing	571	19	Lezanski (POL); L 88–97	Did not advance				
Juan Miguel Zarzuela	Men's individual recurve standing	602	9	Roumeliotis (GRE); W 97–90	Tuchinov (RUS); W 98–97	Esposito (ITA); L 95–102	Did not advance		
Manuel Candela; Antonio Sanchez; Juan Miguel Zarzuela	Men's team recurve	1755	5	—N/a		Japan (JPN); L 183–188	Did not advance		

=== Athletics ===
==== Men's track ====
Athlete	Class	Event	Heats		Semifinal		Final	
Athlete	Class	Event	Result	Rank	Result	Rank	Result	Rank
Abderrahman Ait Khamouch	T46	800m	2:00.67	7 Q	—N/a		1:53.68	3rd place, bronze medalist(s)
Abderrahman Ait Khamouch	T46	1500m	4:08.67	5 Q	—N/a		3:53.46	2nd place, silver medalist(s)
Miguel Ángel Arroyo	T13	1500m	4:16.19	13	Did not advance			
Abel Avila	T12	800m	1:56.60	2 q	—N/a		1:55.17	4
Abel Avila	T12	800m	4:01.49	3 Q	—N/a		4:10.22	8
Ignacio Avila	T12	800m	1:56.95	5	Did not advance			
Ignacio Avila	T12	1500m	4:01.90	4 Q	—N/a		4:07.00	3rd place, bronze medalist(s)
Rafael Botello	T54	1500m	3:09.66	11 q	3:11.30	21	Did not advance	
Rafael Botello	T54	5000m	10:54.43	24	Did not advance			
Rafael Botello	T54	Marathon	—N/a				1:23:53	11
Jose Antonio Castilla	T46	Marathon	—N/a				2:45:47	10
Jose Javier Conde	T46	Marathon	—N/a				2:45:48	11
Manuel Garnica Roldan	T12	10000m	—N/a				DNF	
Manuel Garnica Roldan	T12	Marathon	—N/a				2:36:02	6
José Manuel González	T36	800m	—N/a				2:15.26	4
Jorge Madera	T54	1500m	3:18.22	31	Did not advance			
Jorge Madera	T54	5000m	10:23.80	14	Did not advance			
Jorge Madera	T54	Marathon	—N/a				1:23:26	8
Gustavo Nieves	T13	5000m	15:28.21	3 Q	—N/a		DNF	
Jose Maria Pampano	T36	800m	—N/a				2:18.01	6
Javier Porras	T11	100m	12.00	17	Did not advance			
Roger Puigbo	T54	5000m	10:15.34	5 q	—N/a		10:25.78	9
Roger Puigbo	T54	Marathon	—N/a				1:23:27	9
Maximiliano Rodríguez	T12	100m	11.50	13	Did not advance			
Maximiliano Rodríguez	T12	200m	23.52	15	Did not advance			

==== Men's field ====
Athlete	Class	Event	Final		
Athlete	Class	Event	Result	Points	Rank
David Bravo	F46	Long jump	6.05 SB	-	8
David Casinos	F11–12	Discus throw	38.85	949	5
David Casinos	F11–12	Shot put	14.50	1050	1st place, gold medalist(s)
Javier Porras	F11	Triple jump	12.71	-	3rd place, bronze medalist(s)

==== Women's track ====
Athlete	Class	Event	Heats		Semifinal		Final	
Athlete	Class	Event	Result	Rank	Result	Rank	Result	Rank
Elena Congost	T12	800m	2:22.74	6	Did not advance			
Elena Congost	T12	1500m	—N/a				4:54.50	6
Rosalia Lazaro	T12	100m	13.40	12 q	13.28	12	Did not advance	
Sara Martinez	T12	100m	13.80	13	Did not advance			
Eva Ngui	T12	100m	12.56	3 q	12.55	2 Q	12.58	3rd place, bronze medalist(s)
Eva Ngui	T12	200m	25.69	3 Q	25.87	3 q	25.70	3rd place, bronze medalist(s)

==== Women's field ====
Athlete	Class	Event	Final		
Athlete	Class	Event	Result	Points	Rank
Jessica Castellano	F12–13	Discus throw	32.72	769	7
Jessica Castellano	F12–13	Shot put	10.89	873	5
Rosalia Lazaro	F12	Long jump	5.52	-	7
Maria Martinez	F12–13	Discus throw	32.14	755	8
Sara Martinez	F12	Long jump	5.00	-	11

=== Boccia ===
==== Individual ====
Athlete	Event	Preliminaries			Quarterfinals	Semifinals	Final	
Athlete	Event	Opponent	Opposition Score	Rank	Opposition Score	Opposition Score	Opposition Score	Rank
Francisco Javier Beltrán	Mixed individual BC1	Wang Y (CHN)	W 6–0	1 Q	Marques (POR); L 3–4	Did not advance		
Francisco Javier Beltrán	Mixed individual BC1	Villano (ARG)	W 14–0	1 Q	Marques (POR); L 3–4	Did not advance		
Francisco Javier Beltrán	Mixed individual BC1	Mawji (CAN)	W 5–4	1 Q	Marques (POR); L 3–4	Did not advance		
Francisco Javier Beltrán	Mixed individual BC1	Hawker (USA)	W 9–1	1 Q	Marques (POR); L 3–4	Did not advance		
Jose Vaquerizo	Mixed individual BC1	J P Fernandes (POR)	L 2–4	2 Q	Shelly (IRL); L 2–8	Did not advance		
Jose Vaquerizo	Mixed individual BC1	Zhang Q (CHN)	W 4–3	2 Q	Shelly (IRL); L 2–8	Did not advance		
Jose Vaquerizo	Mixed individual BC1	Leung M Y (HKG)	W 5–0	2 Q	Shelly (IRL); L 2–8	Did not advance		
Jose Vaquerizo	Mixed individual BC1	Sarela (FIN)	W 3–2	2 Q	Shelly (IRL); L 2–8	Did not advance		
Pedro Cordero	Mixed individual BC2	Yan Z (CHN)	W 6–0	1 Q	Murray (GBR); L 4–7	Did not advance		
Pedro Cordero	Mixed individual BC2	McLeod (CAN)	W 9–0	1 Q	Murray (GBR); L 4–7	Did not advance		
Pedro Cordero	Mixed individual BC2	Koivuniemi (FIN)	W 15–0	1 Q	Murray (GBR); L 4–7	Did not advance		
Manuel Angel Martin	Mixed individual BC2	Goncalves (POR)	W 4–2	1 Q	Uchida (JPN); W 3–1	Kwok H Y K (HKG); L 3–4	Cortez (ARG); W 3–2	3rd place, bronze medalist(s)
Manuel Angel Martin	Mixed individual BC2	Norsterud (NOR)	W 10–0	1 Q	Uchida (JPN); W 3–1	Kwok H Y K (HKG); L 3–4	Cortez (ARG); W 3–2	3rd place, bronze medalist(s)
Manuel Angel Martin	Mixed individual BC2	Wong W H (HKG)	W 8–1	1 Q	Uchida (JPN); W 3–1	Kwok H Y K (HKG); L 3–4	Cortez (ARG); W 3–2	3rd place, bronze medalist(s)
Yolanda Martin	Mixed individual BC3	A Costa (POR)	L 0–8	3	Did not advance			
Yolanda Martin	Mixed individual BC3	P Gauthier (CAN)	L 1–5	3	Did not advance			
Yolanda Martin	Mixed individual BC3	Stavropoulou (GRE)	W 12–0	3	Did not advance			
Santiago Pesquera	Mixed individual BC3	Kabush (CAN)	L 1–5	1 Q	Jeong (KOR); L 0–8	Did not advance		
Santiago Pesquera	Mixed individual BC3	Raimundo (POR)	W 7–4	1 Q	Jeong (KOR); L 0–8	Did not advance		
Santiago Pesquera	Mixed individual BC3	Michos (GRE)	W 14–0	1 Q	Jeong (KOR); L 0–8	Did not advance		
José Manuel Rodríguez Vazquez	Mixed individual BC3	Shin (KOR)	L 0–14	2	Did not advance			
José Manuel Rodríguez Vazquez	Mixed individual BC3	Jackson (NZL)	W 4–3	2	Did not advance			
José Manuel Rodríguez Vazquez	Mixed individual BC3	Zhu J (CHN)	W 6–1	2	Did not advance			
Maria Desamparados Baixauli	Mixed individual BC4	Qi C (CHN)	L 0–9	4	Did not advance			
Maria Desamparados Baixauli	Mixed individual BC4	E Santos (BRA)	L 0–12	4	Did not advance			
Maria Desamparados Baixauli	Mixed individual BC4	Prochazka (CZE)	L 1–8	4	Did not advance			
Jose Maria Dueso	Mixed individual BC4	Lau W Y V (HKG)	W 6–5	2 Q	Qi C (CHN); W 6–2	Leung Y W (HKG); L 1–6	E Santos (BRA); L 1–7	4
Jose Maria Dueso	Mixed individual BC4	Beres (HUN)	W 7–6	2 Q	Qi C (CHN); W 6–2	Leung Y W (HKG); L 1–6	E Santos (BRA); L 1–7	4
Jose Maria Dueso	Mixed individual BC4	Kratina (CZE)	L 2–6	2 Q	Qi C (CHN); W 6–2	Leung Y W (HKG); L 1–6	E Santos (BRA); L 1–7	4

==== Pairs / team events ====
Athlete	Event	Preliminaries			Quarterfinals	Semifinals	Final	
Athlete	Event	Opponent	Opposition Score	Rank	Opposition Score	Opposition Score	Opposition Score	Rank
Francisco Javier Beltrán; Pedro Cordero; Manuel Angel Martin; Jose Vaquerizo	Mixed team BC1-2	Ireland (IRL)	W 12–1	1 Q	Hong Kong (HKG); W 8–4	Portugal (POR); L 2–8	China (CHN); W 5–4	3rd place, bronze medalist(s)
Francisco Javier Beltrán; Pedro Cordero; Manuel Angel Martin; Jose Vaquerizo	Mixed team BC1-2	Finland (FIN)	W 16–1	1 Q	Hong Kong (HKG); W 8–4	Portugal (POR); L 2–8	China (CHN); W 5–4	3rd place, bronze medalist(s)
Yolanda Martin; Santiago Pesquera; José Manuel Rodríguez Vazquez	Pairs BC3	Jeong (KOR); Park K W (KOR); Shin (KOR)	L 3–9	2 Q	—N/a	Portugal (POR) (A Costa, Peixoto, Raimundo); W 6–4	South Korea (KOR) (Jeong, Park K W, Shin); L 1–8	2nd place, silver medalist(s)
Yolanda Martin; Santiago Pesquera; José Manuel Rodríguez Vazquez	Pairs BC3	P Gauthier (CAN); Kabush (CAN); Martino (CAN)	W 9–1	2 Q	—N/a	Portugal (POR) (A Costa, Peixoto, Raimundo); W 6–4	South Korea (KOR) (Jeong, Park K W, Shin); L 1–8	2nd place, silver medalist(s)
Yolanda Martin; Santiago Pesquera; José Manuel Rodríguez Vazquez	Pairs BC3	Shen (CHN); Zhu H (CHN); Zhu J (CHN)	L 1–5	2 Q	—N/a	Portugal (POR) (A Costa, Peixoto, Raimundo); W 6–4	South Korea (KOR) (Jeong, Park K W, Shin); L 1–8	2nd place, silver medalist(s)
Maria Desamparados Baixauli; Jose Maria Dueso	Pairs BC4	Pinto (BRA) / E Santos (BRA)	W 5–0	1 Q	—N/a	F Pereira (POR) / Valentim (POR); L 3–4	Kratina (CZE) / Prochazka (CZE); L 3–7	4
Maria Desamparados Baixauli; Jose Maria Dueso	Pairs BC4	Durkovic (SVK) / Streharsky (SVK)	W 6–1	1 Q	—N/a	F Pereira (POR) / Valentim (POR); L 3–4	Kratina (CZE) / Prochazka (CZE); L 3–7	4
Maria Desamparados Baixauli; Jose Maria Dueso	Pairs BC4	Beres (HUN) / Gyurkota (HUN)	W 6–4	1 Q	—N/a	F Pereira (POR) / Valentim (POR); L 3–4	Kratina (CZE) / Prochazka (CZE); L 3–7	4

=== Cycling ===
==== Men's road ====
Athlete	Event	Time	Rank
Roberto Alcaide	Men's road race LC1/LC2/CP4	1:46:13	8
Roberto Alcaide	Men's road time trial LC2	34:18.86	3rd place, bronze medalist(s)
Jose Vicente Arzo	Men's road race HC C	1:26:11	4
Jose Vicente Arzo	Men's road time trial HC C	20:36.91	2nd place, silver medalist(s)
Maurice Far Eckhard	Men's road race LC3/LC4/CP3	1:38:03	8
Maurice Far Eckhard	Men's road time trial CP3	38:47.82	4
Antonio García	Men's road race LC3/LC4/CP3	1:38:01	5
Antonio García	Men's road time trial LC3	38:48.66	4
Amador Granado	Men's road race LC1/LC2/CP4	2:03:02	31
Juan José Méndez Fernández	Men's road race LC3/LC4/CP3	1:41:03	18
Juan José Méndez Fernández	Men's road time trial LC4	39:54.68	2nd place, silver medalist(s)
Cesar Neira	Men's road race LC1/LC2/CP4	1:46:13	10
Cesar Neira	Men's road time trial CP4	35:53.98	1st place, gold medalist(s)
Javier Ochoa	Men's road race LC3/LC4/CP3	1:37:02	2nd place, silver medalist(s)
Javier Ochoa	Men's road time trial CP3	37:26.47	1st place, gold medalist(s)
Aitor Oroza	Mixed road race CP1/CP2	1:03:27	11
Aitor Oroza	Mixed road time trial CP1/CP2	31:58.01	7
Francisco González; Juan Francisco Suarez (pilot)	Men's road race B&VI 1-3	2:18:06	9
Francisco González; Juan Francisco Suarez (pilot)	Men's road time trial B&VI 1-3	33:09.09	6
Christian Venge; David Llaurado	Men's road race B&VI 1-3	2:18:06	8
Christian Venge; David Llaurado	Men's road time trial B&VI 1-3	32:01.12	1st place, gold medalist(s)

==== Men's track ====
Athlete	Event	Qualification		Final	
Athlete	Event	Time	Rank	Opposition Time	Rank
Roberto Alcaide	Men's individual pursuit LC2	4:51.48	2 Q	Ježek (CZE); L 4:50.32	2nd place, silver medalist(s)
Roberto Alcaide	Men's time trial LC2	—N/a		1:16.06	8
Maurice Far Eckhard	Men's time trial CP3	—N/a		1:27.45	8
Antonio García	Men's individual pursuit LC3	4:00.70	6	Did not advance	
Antonio García	Men's time trial LC3-4	—N/a		1:22.0	10
Victor Garrido	Men's time trial LC3-4	—N/a		1:24.7	15
Amador Granado	Men's individual pursuit LC2	5:49.53	9	Did not advance	
Amador Granado	Men's time trial LC2	—N/a		1:12.76	5
Juan José Méndez Fernández	Men's individual pursuit LC4	4:16.69	3 q	Winkler (GER); W 4:14.98	3rd place, bronze medalist(s)
Cesar Neira	Men's individual pursuit CP4	3:45.322	4 Q	Bouska (CZE); W 3:45.753	3rd place, bronze medalist(s)
Cesar Neira	Men's time trial CP4	—N/a		1:15.39	4
Javier Ochoa	Men's individual pursuit CP3	DSQ		Did not advance	
Javier Ochoa	Men's time trial CP3	—N/a		1:18.52	4
Francisco González; Juan Francisco Suarez (pilot)	Men's individual pursuit B&VI 1-3	4:38.548	8	Did not advance	
Francisco González; Juan Francisco Suarez (pilot)	Men's time trial B&VI 1-3	—N/a		1:08.260	9
Christian Venge; David Llaurado (pilot)	Men's individual pursuit B&VI 1-3	4:25.335	2 Q	Modra (AUS) / Lawrence (AUS); L OVL	2nd place, silver medalist(s)
Roberto Alcaide; Amador Granado; Javier Ochoa	Men's team sprint	58.584	7	Did not advance	

==== Women's road ====
Athlete	Event	Time	Rank
Raquel Acinas	Women's road time trial LC3/LC4/CP3	47:30.48	6
Ana Lopez; Marina Girona (pilot)	Women's road race B&VI 1-3	2:01:24	7
Ana Lopez; Marina Girona (pilot)	Women's road time trial B&VI 1-3	39:11.65	5

==== Women's track ====
Athlete	Event	Qualification		Final	
Athlete	Event	Time	Rank	Opposition Time	Rank
Raquel Acinas	Women's individual pursuit LC3-4/CP3	4:51.156	10	Did not advance	
Raquel Acinas	Women's time trial LC3–4/CP3	—N/a		49.7	9
Ana Lopez; Marina Girona (pilot)	Women's individual pursuit B&VI 1-3	3:59.328	8	Did not advance	
Ana Lopez; Marina Girona (pilot)	Women's time trial B&VI 1-3	—N/a		1:19.712	8

=== Football 5-a-side ===
The men's football 5-a-side team didn't win any medals; they were defeated by Argentina in the bronze medal match by penalties.

==== Players ====
- Adolfo Acosta Rodriguez
- Vicente Aguilar Carmona
- Alfredo Cuadrado
- Pedro Garcia Villa
- Carmelo Garrido Alarcon
- Jose Manuel Gomez
- Álvaro González Alcaraz
- Antonio Martin Gaitan
- Marcelo Rosado Carrasco

==== Tournament ====
7 September 2008
9:30

Argentina	2–0	Spain

Olympic Green Hockey Field
9 September 2008
11:00

Spain	0–1	Brazil

Olympic Green Hockey Field
11 September 2008
13:00

Great Britain	1–3	Spain

Olympic Green Hockey Field
Attendance: 2,021
Referee: Nelson Luis Glock (Brazil)
13 September 2008
9:00

Spain	0–1	China

Olympic Green Hockey Field
15 September 2008
11:00

South Korea	2–2	Spain

Olympic Green Hockey Field

Bronze medal match

17 September 2008
11:00

Spain	1–1 (a.e.t.)	Argentina
Martin Gaitan 1'; Aguilar (yellow card) 30' (red card) 31'; Gonzalez Alcaraz (yellow card) 33'		Velo 42'
Penalties
	0–1

Olympic Green Hockey Field
Referee: Nelson Luis Glock (Brazil)

=== Goalball ===
The men's goalball team didn't win any medals; they were 12th out of 12 teams.

==== Players ====
- Vicente Galiana
- Jose Fernando Garcia
- Raul Garcia
- Jose Perez
- Tomas Rubio
- Jesus Nazaret Santana Guillen

==== Tournament ====
7 September 2008

Spain	2–2	Denmark

Beijing Institute of Technology Gymnasium
8 September 2008

Belgium	12–6	Spain

Beijing Institute of Technology Gymnasium
9 September 2008

Spain	0–10	Lithuania

Beijing Institute of Technology Gymnasium
10 September 2008

Slovenia	11–9	Spain

Beijing Institute of Technology Gymnasium
11 September 2008

Spain	3–7	Finland

Beijing Institute of Technology Gymnasium

11/12th classification

12 September 2008

Brazil	7–3	Spain

Beijing Institute of Technology Gymnasium

=== Judo ===
==== Men ====
Athlete	Event	First round	Quarterfinals	Semifinals	Repechage round 1	Repechage round 2	Final/ Bronze medal contest
Athlete	Event	Opposition Result	Opposition Result	Opposition Result	Opposition Result	Opposition Result	Opposition Result
David Garcia del Valle	Men's 66kg	Golmohammadi (IRI); L 0000–1000	—N/a		Karpeniuk (UKR); KG	Did not advance	
Salvador Gonzalez	Men's 81kg	Novruzzade (AZE); L 0000–1000	Did not advance				
Rafael Moreno	Men's +100kg	Park J-m (KOR); L 0000–1100	—N/a		Bye	Taurines (FRA); L 0010–1000	Did not advance
Abel Vazquez	Men's 90kg	Kretsul (RUS); L 0000–1100	—N/a		Clarke (AUS); W 0121–0000	Shevchenko (RUS); L 0000–0001	Did not advance

==== Women ====
Athlete	Event	First round	Quarterfinals	Semifinals	Repechage round 1	Repechage round 2	Final/ Bronze medal contest
Athlete	Event	Opposition Result	Opposition Result	Opposition Result	Opposition Result	Opposition Result	Opposition Result
Marta Arce	Women's 63kg	Teixeira (BRA); W 1001–0001	Quessandier (FRA); W 0200–0000	Kazakova (RUS); W 0011–0002	—N/a		Soazo (VEN); L 0000-1000 (silver)
Sara de Pinies	Women's +70kg	De Silva (BRA); L 0010–1000	—N/a			Manzuoli (FRA); W 1030–0000	Bouazoug (ALG); L 0001–0201
Maria del Carmen Herrera	Women's 70kg	Mouton (USA); W 1000–0000	—N/a	Vermeulen (NED); W 0011–0001	—N/a		Ruvalcaba (MEX); W 1021-0000 (gold)
Laura Garcia	Women's 48kg	—N/a	Guo H (CHN); L 0000–0200	—N/a	Bye	Brussig (GER); L 0000–1000	Did not advance
Sheila Hernandez	Women's 52kg	Stepanyuk (RUS); L 0000–1000	—N/a			Nhoi Trieu (VIE); W 0200–0000	M Ferreira (BRA); L 0000–1000
Maria Monica Merenciano	Women's 57kg	Da Silva (BRA); W 0101–0042	—N/a	Wang L (CHN); L 0000–1000	—N/a		Keramida (GRE); W 0010-0002 (bronze)

=== Powerlifting ===
==== Women ====
Athlete	Event	Result	Rank
Loida Zabala	48kg	80.0	7

=== Rowing ===
Athlete	Event	Heats		Repechage		Final	
Athlete	Event	Time	Rank	Time	Rank	Time	Rank
Juan Pablo Barcia Alonso	Men's single sculls	6:13.69	12 R	6:25.87	10 FB	6:15.29	6

=== Sailing ===
Athlete	Event	Race										Total points	Net points Total	Rank
Athlete	Event	1	2	3	4	5	6	7	8	9	10	Total points	Net points Total	Rank
Emilio Fernández	2.4mR	14	12	15	12	11	10	(16)	9	(16)	5	130	98	15

=== Shooting ===
==== Men ====
Athlete	Event	Qualification		Final		
Athlete	Event	Score	Rank	Score	Total	Rank
Jose Luis Martinez	Men's 10m air pistol SH1	538	32	Did not advance		
Jose Luis Martinez	Mixed 25m pistol SH1	541	24	Did not advance		
Jose Luis Martinez	Mixed 50m pistol SH1	504	24	Did not advance		
Miguel Orobitg	Men's 10m air rifle standing SH1	573	22	Did not advance		
Miguel Orobitg	Men's 50m rifle 3 positions SH1	1113	18	Did not advance		
Miguel Orobitg	Mixed 10m air rifle prone SH1	595	27	Did not advance		
Miguel Orobitg	Mixed 50m rifle prone SH1	570	36	Did not advance		
Francisco Angel Soriano	Men's 10m air pistol SH1	548	29	Did not advance		
Francisco Angel Soriano	Mixed 25m pistol SH1	DNS		Did not advance		
Francisco Angel Soriano	Mixed 50m pistol SH1	512	19	Did not advance		

=== Swimming ===
==== Men ====
Athlete	Class	Event	Heats		Final	
Athlete	Class	Event	Result	Rank	Result	Rank
Luis Antonio Arevalo	S13	400m freestyle	4:46.03	9	Did not advance	
Luis Antonio Arevalo	SB13	100m breaststroke	1:19.84	13	Did not advance	
Luis Antonio Arevalo	SM13	200m individual medley	2:36.01	15	Did not advance	
Pablo Cimadevila	SB4	100m breaststroke	1:48.45	5 Q	1:46.11	5
Pablo Cimadevila	SM5	200m individual medley	3:06.41	3 Q	3:01.58	3rd place, bronze medalist(s)
Jesús Collado	S9	100m backstroke	1:09.04	7 Q	1:05.45	4
Jesús Collado	S9	100m butterfly	1:02.55	6 Q	1:01.28	4
Jesús Collado	S9	100m freestyle	58.82	9	Did not advance	
Jesús Collado	S9	400m freestyle	4:25.05	2 Q	4:17.02 WR	1st place, gold medalist(s)
Javier Crespo	SB9	100m breaststroke	1:12.87	6 Q	1:12.31	6
Eduardo Cruz	S11	100m backstroke	1:23.03	14	Did not advance	
Eduardo Cruz	S11	100m butterfly	1:18.75	11	Did not advance	
Eduardo Cruz	S11	50m freestyle	29.34	14	Did not advance	
Eduardo Cruz	S11	100m freestyle	1:05.05	11	Did not advance	
Eduardo Cruz	S11	400m freestyle	5:23.44	10	Did not advance	
Enhamed Enhamed	S11	100m backstroke	1:17.27	8 Q	1:16.90	8
Enhamed Enhamed	S11	100m butterfly	1:03.74	1 Q	1:01.12 WR	1st place, gold medalist(s)
Enhamed Enhamed	S11	50m freestyle	26.34	1 Q	25.82 WR	1st place, gold medalist(s)
Enhamed Enhamed	S11	100m freestyle	1:00.52	2 Q	57.64 PR	1st place, gold medalist(s)
Enhamed Enhamed	S11	400m freestyle	4:54.44	2 Q	4:38.82	1st place, gold medalist(s)
Enrique Floriano	S12	100m freestyle	59.38	11	Did not advance	
Enrique Floriano	S12	400m freestyle	4:22.64	1 Q	4:15.89	2nd place, silver medalist(s)
Enrique Floriano	SB12	100m breaststroke	1:14.97	6 Q	1:12.27	4
Enrique Floriano	SM12	200m individual medley	2:19.87	5 Q	2:16.79	4
Omar Font	S12	50m freestyle	25.61	6 Q	25.26	5
Omar Font	S12	100m freestyle	56.01	7 Q	55.75	6
Omar Font	S12	400m freestyle	4:46.22	8 Q	4:35.64	7
Arkaitz Garcia Tolson	S4	50m backstroke	55.01	9	Did not advance	
Albert Gelis	S12	100m backstroke	1:05.03	6 Q	1:06.66	8
Albert Gelis	S12	100m butterfly	1:03.70	8 Q	1:03.69	8
Albert Gelis	S12	50m freestyle	26.74	9	Did not advance	
Albert Gelis	S12	100m freestyle	58.15	8 Q	58.70	8
Albert Gelis	SM12	200m individual medley	2:23.64	8 Q	2:24.80	7
Juan Diego Gil	S12	400m freestyle	4:40.31	6 Q	4:32.43	6
Vicente Gil	SB3	50m breaststroke	49.46	2 Q	49.91	2nd place, silver medalist(s)
Jordi Gordillo	S5	50m freestyle	36.70	8 Q	36.88	8
Jordi Gordillo	S5	100m freestyle	1:25.91	8 Q	1:25.94	8
Jordi Gordillo	S5	200m freestyle	—N/a		3:02.30	7
David Levecq	S10	100m butterfly	59.80	3 Q	58.53	2nd place, silver medalist(s)
David Levecq	S10	50m freestyle	25.20	7 Q	24.87	5
David Levecq	S10	100m freestyle	55.15	5 Q	54.73	5
Daniel Llambrich	S12	50m freestyle	27.41	12	Did not advance	
Daniel Llambrich	SB12	100m breaststroke	1:15.13	7 Q	DSQ	
Miguel Luque	S5	50m backstroke	48.21	11	Did not advance	
Miguel Luque	SB3	50m breaststroke	51.92	3 Q	52.83	3rd place, bronze medalist(s)
Miguel Luque	SM4	150m individual medley	2:48.08	4 Q	2:45.67	4
Jose Antonio Mari	S9	100m butterfly	1:05.26	11	Did not advance	
Jose Antonio Mari	S9	50m freestyle	26.73	7 Q	26.89	8
Jose Antonio Mari	S9	100m freestyle	59.07	13	Did not advance	
Jose Antonio Mari	S9	400m freestyle	4:36.75	10	Did not advance	
Miguel Ángel Martínez	S3	50m backstroke	55.90	5 Q	56.82	5
Miguel Ángel Martínez	S3	50m freestyle	57.32	6 Q	57.11	6
Miguel Ángel Martínez	S3	100m freestyle	2:02.20	5 Q	2:02.29	5
Kevin Mendez	S13	100m backstroke	1:11.38	10	Did not advance	
Kevin Mendez	S13	100m butterfly	1:03.02	10	Did not advance	
Kevin Mendez	S13	400m freestyle	4:35.29	8 Q	4:33.75	8
Kevin Mendez	SM13	200m individual medley	2:27.75	11	Did not advance	
Israel Oliver	S12	100m butterfly	1:02.86	7 Q	1:03.10	7
Israel Oliver	SB12	100m breaststroke	1:14.45	4 Q	1:13.31	5
Israel Oliver	SM12	200m individual medley	2:25.12	9	Did not advance	
Richard Oribe	S4	50m freestyle	39.30	2 Q	38.69	2nd place, silver medalist(s)
Richard Oribe	S4	100m freestyle	1:26.96	3 Q	1:26.62	2nd place, silver medalist(s)
Richard Oribe	S4	200m freestyle	3:00.45 PR	1 Q	2:55.81 WR	1st place, gold medalist(s)
Sebastián Rodríguez	S5	50m freestyle	35.46	6 Q	33.78	3rd place, bronze medalist(s)
Sebastián Rodríguez	S5	100m freestyle	1:18.44	4 Q	1:16.15	5
Sebastián Rodríguez	S5	200m freestyle	—N/a		2:38.88	2nd place, silver medalist(s)
Alejandro Sánchez	S8	100m butterfly	1:10.18	12	Did not advance	
Alejandro Sánchez	SB8	100m breaststroke	1:14.61	2 Q	1:13.44	3rd place, bronze medalist(s)
Alejandro Sánchez	SM8	200m individual medley	2:40.23	8 Q	2:36.66	4
Ricardo Ten	S5	50m backstroke	46.90	7 Q	45.28	6
Ricardo Ten	S5	50m butterfly	46.24	11	Did not advance	
Ricardo Ten	SB4	100m breaststroke	1:40.72	1 Q	1:36.61 WR	1st place, gold medalist(s)
Vicente Javier Torres	S5	50m backstroke	47.49	9	Did not advance	
Vicente Javier Torres	SM4	150m individual medley	2:46.89	3 Q	2:40.91	2nd place, silver medalist(s)
Daniel Vidal	S6	50m butterfly	34.00	6 Q	32.97	5
Daniel Vidal	S6	50m freestyle	32.06	5 Q	31.27	4
Daniel Vidal	S6	100m freestyle	1:11.37	5 Q	1:10.41	4
Jordi Gordillo; Richard Oribe; Sebastián Rodríguez; Daniel Vidal	N/A	4 × 50 m freestyle relay	—N/a		2:18.73	2nd place, silver medalist(s)
Jesús Collado; David Levecq; Jose Antonio Mari; Daniel Vidal	N/A	4 × 100 m freestyle relay	—N/a		3:59.45	5
Pablo Cimadevila; Vicente Gil; Ricardo Ten; Vicente Javier Torres	N/A	4 × 50 m medley relay	3:00.44	5 Q	2:40.38	3rd place, bronze medalist(s)
Jesús Collado; David Levecq; Alejandro Sánchez; Daniel Vidal	N/A	4 × 100 m medley relay	4:33.73	6 Q	4:21.81	4

==== Women ====
Athlete	Class	Event	Heats		Final	
Athlete	Class	Event	Result	Rank	Result	Rank
Amaya Alonso	S12	100m butterfly	1:16.13	7 Q	1:15.09	6
Amaya Alonso	S12	100m freestyle	1:06.45	7 Q	1:07.48	8
Amaya Alonso	SM12	200m individual medley	2:47.51	7 Q	2:48.71	8
Lidia Marta Banos	SM13	200m individual medley	—N/a		2:48.80	7
Sara Carracelas	S2	50m backstroke	1:18.31	3 Q	1:16.33	3rd place, bronze medalist(s)
Sara Carracelas	S3	50m freestyle	1:17.28	10	Did not advance	
Carla Casals	S12	100m butterfly	1:13.46	3 Q	1:11.94	4
Carla Casals	S12	50m freestyle	31.69	11	Did not advance	
Carla Casals	SB12	100m breaststroke	1:21.40	4 Q	1:20.72	6
Carla Casals	SM12	200m individual medley	2:49.65	8 Q	2:44.73	7
Julia Castelló	S6	100m backstroke	1:44.00	10	Did not advance	
Julia Castelló	SB5	100m breaststroke	2:10.71	11	Did not advance	
Deborah Font	S12	50m freestyle	28.93	2 Q	28.23	3rd place, bronze medalist(s)
Deborah Font	S12	100m freestyle	1:03.17	4 Q	1:01.98	4
Deborah Font	SB12	100m breaststroke	1:20.11 PR	2 Q	1:20.38	5
Ana Garcia-Arcicollar	S12	100m butterfly	1:09.56	2 Q	1:08.86	2nd place, silver medalist(s)
Ana Garcia-Arcicollar	S12	50m freestyle	29.00	3 Q	28.93	7
Ana Garcia-Arcicollar	S12	100m freestyle	1:04.82	6 Q	1:02.39	5
Ana Garcia-Arcicollar	SM12	200m individual medley	2:43.38	5 Q	2:35.64	4
Sarai Gascón Moreno	S9	100m butterfly	1:13.81	8 Q	1:11.05	5
Sarai Gascón Moreno	S9	50m freestyle	DSQ		Did not advance	
Sarai Gascón Moreno	SB9	100m breaststroke	1:26.49	4 Q	1:24.51	2nd place, silver medalist(s)
Sarai Gascón Moreno	SM9	200m individual medley	2:46.93	9	Did not advance	
Sandra Gomez	SB12	100m breaststroke	1:21.39	3 Q	1:18.06	2nd place, silver medalist(s)
Esther Morales	S10	100m backstroke	1:14.85	6 Q	1:13.77	3rd place, bronze medalist(s)
Esther Morales	S10	50m freestyle	29.94	7 Q	29.75	7
Esther Morales	S10	100m freestyle	1:04.25	6 Q	1:04.20	6
Teresa Perales	S5	50m backstroke	44.92	2 Q	44.58	2nd place, silver medalist(s)
Teresa Perales	S5	50m freestyle	36.75 PR	1 Q	35.88 WR	1st place, gold medalist(s)
Teresa Perales	S5	100m freestyle	1:22.22	2 Q	1:16.65 WR	1st place, gold medalist(s)
Teresa Perales	S5	200m freestyle	2:58.91	3 Q	2:47.47	1st place, gold medalist(s)
Teresa Perales	S6	50m butterfly	48.05	13	Did not advance	
Teresa Perales	SB4	100m breaststroke	2:04.68	5 Q	2:01.25	3rd place, bronze medalist(s)
Ester Rodriguez	SB8	100m breaststroke	1:31.70	8 Q	DNS	
Ester Rodriguez	SM9	200m individual medley	2:55.93	15	Did not advance	
Ana Rubio Zavala	SB9	100m breaststroke	1:29.40	9	Did not advance	
Ana Rubio Zavala	SM10	200m individual medley	2:58.17	12	Did not advance	

=== Table tennis ===
==== Men ====
Athlete	Event	Preliminaries				Quarterfinals	Semifinals	Final / BM	
Athlete	Event	Opposition Result	Opposition Result	Opposition Result	Rank	Opposition Result	Opposition Result	Opposition Result	Rank
Jorge Cardona	Men's singles C9–10	Andersson (SWE); L 0–3	Baroncelli (ITA); L 1–3	—N/a	3	Did not advance			
Jordi Morales	Men's singles C7	Ye C (CHN); L 1–3	Karabardak (GBR); W 3–2	Lambert (CZE); W 3–0	2	Did not advance			
Tomas Piñas	Men's singles C3	Kylevik (SWE); W 3–1	Chan (GBR); W 3–2	—N/a	1 Q	Gurtler (GER); W 3–1	Robin (FRA); L 0–3	Algacir (BRA); W 3–0	3rd place, bronze medalist(s)
Jose Manuel Ruiz	Men's singles C9–10	Rozier (FRA); W 3–0	Korn (GER); W 3–2	—N/a	1 Q	Andersson (SWE); L 2–3	Did not advance		
Alvaro Valera	Men's singles C7	Furlan (ITA); W 3–1	Youssef (EGY); W 3–1	Qin X (CHN); W 3–1	1 Q	—N/a	Wollmert (GER); L 1–3	Seidenfeld (USA); W 3–1	3rd place, bronze medalist(s)

==== Teams ====
Athlete	Event	Round of 16	Quarterfinals	Semifinals	Final / BM	
Athlete	Event	Opposition Result	Opposition Result	Opposition Result	Opposition Result	Rank
Jordi Morales; Alvaro Valera	Men's team C6–8	Russia (RUS); W 3–1	Slovakia (SVK); L 0–3	Did not advance		
Jorge Cardona; Jose Manuel Ruiz	Men's team C9–10	—N/a	Netherlands (NED); W 3–0	Czech Republic (CZE); W 3–2	China (CHN); L 0–3	2nd place, silver medalist(s)

=== Wheelchair fencing ===
==== Men ====
Athlete	Event	Qualification			Round of 16	Quarterfinal	Semifinal	Final / BM	
Athlete	Event	Opposition	Score	Rank	Opposition Score	Opposition Score	Opposition Score	Opposition Score	Rank
Juan Arnau	Men's sabre B	François (FRA)	L 3–5	5 Q	Mari (ITA); L 7–15	Did not advance			
Juan Arnau	Men's sabre B	Shenkevych (UKR)	L 4–5	5 Q	Mari (ITA); L 7–15	Did not advance			
Juan Arnau	Men's sabre B	Szekeres (HUN)	W 5–3	5 Q	Mari (ITA); L 7–15	Did not advance			
Juan Arnau	Men's sabre B	Fawcett (GBR)	L 0–5	5 Q	Mari (ITA); L 7–15	Did not advance			
Juan Arnau	Men's sabre B	Mainville (CAN)	W 5–3	5 Q	Mari (ITA); L 7–15	Did not advance			
Fernando Granell	Men's épée A	Zhang L (CHN)	W 5–4	5 Q	Zhang L (CHN); L 7–15	Did not advance			
Fernando Granell	Men's épée A	Citerne (FRA)	L 2–5	5 Q	Zhang L (CHN); L 7–15	Did not advance			
Fernando Granell	Men's épée A	Pender (POL)	L 1–5	5 Q	Zhang L (CHN); L 7–15	Did not advance			
Fernando Granell	Men's épée A	Bazhukov (UKR)	L 2–5	5 Q	Zhang L (CHN); L 7–15	Did not advance			
Fernando Granell	Men's épée A	Andree (GER)	W 5–2	5 Q	Zhang L (CHN); L 7–15	Did not advance			
Fernando Granell	Men's foil A	Zhang L (CHN)	L 0–5	5 Q	Betti (ITA); L 5–15	Did not advance			
Fernando Granell	Men's foil A	Betti (ITA)	L 0–5	5 Q	Betti (ITA); L 5–15	Did not advance			
Fernando Granell	Men's foil A	Alqallaf (KUW)	L 0–5	5 Q	Betti (ITA); L 5–15	Did not advance			
Fernando Granell	Men's foil A	Horvath (HUN)	L 4–5	5 Q	Betti (ITA); L 5–15	Did not advance			
Fernando Granell	Men's foil A	Saengsawang (THA)	W 5–4	5 Q	Betti (ITA); L 5–15	Did not advance			
Fernando Granell	Men's foil A	Andree (GER)	W 5–3	5 Q	Betti (ITA); L 5–15	Did not advance			
Luis Miguel Redondo	Men's sabre A	Tian J (CHN)	L 1–5	6	Did not advance				
Luis Miguel Redondo	Men's sabre A	Chan W K (HKG)	L 2–5	6	Did not advance				
Luis Miguel Redondo	Men's sabre A	Pylarinos Markantonatos (GRE)	L 0–5	6	Did not advance				
Luis Miguel Redondo	Men's sabre A	Davydenko (UKR)	L 1–5	6	Did not advance				
Luis Miguel Redondo	Men's sabre A	Serafini (ITA)	L 2–5	6	Did not advance				
Luis Sanchez	Men's épée A	Maillard (FRA)	L 3–5	6	Did not advance				
Luis Sanchez	Men's épée A	Pylarinos Markantonatos (GRE)	L 3–5	6	Did not advance				
Luis Sanchez	Men's épée A	Alhaddad (KUW)	L 0–5	6	Did not advance				
Luis Sanchez	Men's épée A	Davydenko (UKR)	L 2–5	6	Did not advance				
Luis Sanchez	Men's épée A	Saengsawang (THA)	L 0–5	6	Did not advance				
Luis Sanchez	Men's épée A	Serafini (ITA)	W 5–1	6	Did not advance				
Luis Sanchez	Men's sabre A	Pellegrini (ITA)	L 0–5	6	Did not advance				
Luis Sanchez	Men's sabre A	More (FRA)	L 3–5	6	Did not advance				
Luis Sanchez	Men's sabre A	Makowski (POL)	L 3–5	6	Did not advance				
Luis Sanchez	Men's sabre A	Calhoun (USA)	L 3–5	6	Did not advance				
Luis Sanchez	Men's sabre A	Frolov (RUS)	L 3–5	6	Did not advance				
Luis Sanchez	Men's sabre A	Altabbakh (KUW)	W 5–2	6	Did not advance				
Carlos Soler	Men's épée B	Cratere (FRA)	L 2–5	5	Did not advance				
Carlos Soler	Men's épée B	Rodgers (USA)	L 3–5	5	Did not advance				
Carlos Soler	Men's épée B	Mainville (CAN)	L 2–5	5	Did not advance				
Carlos Soler	Men's épée B	Hu D (CHN)	L 0–5	5	Did not advance				
Carlos Soler	Men's épée B	Hisakawa (JPN)	W 5–1	5	Did not advance				
Carlos Soler	Men's sabre B	Mari (ITA)	L 3–5	5 Q	Bogdos (GRE); W 15–14	Hui C H (HKG); L 10–15	Did not advance		
Carlos Soler	Men's sabre B	Hui C H (HKG)	W 5–2	5 Q	Bogdos (GRE); W 15–14	Hui C H (HKG); L 10–15	Did not advance		
Carlos Soler	Men's sabre B	Pluta (POL)	L 2–5	5 Q	Bogdos (GRE); W 15–14	Hui C H (HKG); L 10–15	Did not advance		
Carlos Soler	Men's sabre B	Yusupov (RUS)	L 0–5	5 Q	Bogdos (GRE); W 15–14	Hui C H (HKG); L 10–15	Did not advance		
Carlos Soler	Men's sabre B	Moreno (USA)	W 5–2	5 Q	Bogdos (GRE); W 15–14	Hui C H (HKG); L 10–15	Did not advance		

==== Women ====
Athlete	Event	Qualification			Quarterfinal	Semifinal	Final / BM	
Athlete	Event	Opposition	Score	Rank	Opposition Score	Opposition Score	Opposition Score	Rank
Gema Victoria Hassen Bey	Women's épée B	Jana (THA)	L 1–5	6	Did not advance			
Gema Victoria Hassen Bey	Women's épée B	Chan Y C (HKG)	L 0–5	6	Did not advance			
Gema Victoria Hassen Bey	Women's épée B	Ye (CHN)	L 3–5	6	Did not advance			
Gema Victoria Hassen Bey	Women's épée B	Dani (HUN)	L 1–5	6	Did not advance			
Gema Victoria Hassen Bey	Women's épée B	Lukianenko (UKR)	L 1–5	6	Did not advance			
Gema Victoria Hassen Bey	Women's foil B	Yao F (CHN)	L 1–5	5	Did not advance			
Gema Victoria Hassen Bey	Women's foil B	Dani (HUN)	L 2–5	5	Did not advance			
Gema Victoria Hassen Bey	Women's foil B	Lukianenko (UKR)	L 2–5	5	Did not advance			
Gema Victoria Hassen Bey	Women's foil B	Magnat (FRA)	W 5–4	5	Did not advance			
Gema Victoria Hassen Bey	Women's foil B	Vettraino (ITA)	L 4–5	5	Did not advance			

=== Wheelchair tennis ===
==== Men ====
Athlete	Class	Event	Round of 64	Round of 32	Round of 16	Quarterfinals	Semifinals	Finals
Athlete	Class	Event	Opposition Result	Opposition Result	Opposition Result	Opposition Result	Opposition Result	Opposition Result
Alvaro Illobre	Open	Men's singles	Pellegrina (SUI); L 6–1, 2–6, 2–6	Did not advance				
Francesc Tur	Open	Men's singles	Prohaszka (HUN); W 6–1, 6–1	Vink (NED); L 1–6, 0–6	Did not advance			
Alvaro Illobre; Francesc Tur	Open	Men's doubles	—N/a	Farkas (HUN) / Prohaszka (HUN); W 6–2, 6–2	Kunieda (JPN) / Saida (JPN); L 1–6, 1–6	Did not advance		

==== Women ====
Athlete	Class	Event	Round of 32	Round of 16	Quarterfinals	Semifinals	Finals
Athlete	Class	Event	Opposition Result	Opposition Result	Opposition Result	Opposition Result	Opposition Result
Maria Dolores Ochoa	Open	Women's singles	Walraven (NED); L 2–6, 1–6	Did not advance			

== See also ==
- 2008 Summer Paralympics
- Spain at the Paralympics
- Spain at the 2008 Summer Olympics
