= Swimming at the 2008 Summer Paralympics – Women's 100 metre freestyle S12 =

Women's 100m Freestyle S12 at the XIII Paralympic Games
- Venue: Beijing National Aquatics Center
- Dates: 12 September
- Competitors: 11 from 7 nations
- Winning time: 59.47

Medalists
1st place, gold medalist(s)		Oxana Savchenko	Russia
2nd place, silver medalist(s)		Anna Efimenko	Russia
3rd place, bronze medalist(s)		Joanna Mendak	Poland

The women's 100m freestyle S12 event at the 2008 Summer Paralympics took place at the Beijing National Aquatics Center on 12 September. There were two heats; the swimmers with the eight fastest times advanced to the final.

== Results ==
=== Heats ===
Competed from 09:53.

==== Heat 1 ====
Rank	Name	Nationality	Time	Notes
1	Yuliya Volkova	Ukraine	1:02.90	Q
2	Joanna Mendak	Poland	1:04.24	Q
3	Ana Garcia-Arcicollar	Spain	1:04.82	Q
4	Amaya Alonso	Spain	1:06.45	Q
5	Belkys Mota	Venezuela	1:07.11	Q

==== Heat 2 ====
Rank	Name	Nationality	Time	Notes
1	Oxana Savchenko	Russia	1:01.27	Q, PR
2	Anna Efimenko	Russia	1:03.01	Q
3	Deborah Font	Spain	1:03.17	Q
4	Patrycja Harajda	Poland	1:08.74	
5	Jacqueline Rennebohm	Canada	1:09.64	
6	Anabel Moro	Argentina	1:09.83	

=== Final ===
Competed at 17:53.

Rank	Name	Nationality	Time	Notes
1st place, gold medalist(s)	Oxana Savchenko	Russia	59.47	WR
2nd place, silver medalist(s)	Anna Efimenko	Russia	1:01.24	
3rd place, bronze medalist(s)	Joanna Mendak	Poland	1:01.57	
4	Deborah Font	Spain	1:01.98	
5	Ana Garcia-Arcicollar	Spain	1:02.39	
6	Yuliya Volkova	Ukraine	1:02.53	
7	Belkys Mota	Venezuela	1:07.35	
8	Amaya Alonso	Spain	1:07.48	

Q = qualified for final. WR = World Record. PR = Paralympic Record.
