= Swimming at the 2008 Summer Paralympics – Women's 100 metre breaststroke SB12 =

Women's 100m Breaststroke SB12 at the XIII Paralympic Games
- Venue: Beijing National Aquatics Center
- Dates: 8 September
- Competitors: 11 from 7 nations
- Winning time: 1:17.58

Medalists
| 1st place, gold medalist(s) | | Karolina Pelendritou | Cyprus |
| 2nd place, silver medalist(s) | | Sandra Gomez | Spain |
| 3rd place, bronze medalist(s) | | Yaryna Matlo | Ukraine |

The women's 100m breaststroke SB12 event at the 2008 Summer Paralympics took place at the Beijing National Aquatics Center on 8 September. There were two heats; the swimmers with the eight fastest times advanced to the final.

== Results ==
=== Heats ===
Competed from 10:35.

==== Heat 1 ====
| Rank | Name | Nationality | Time | Notes |
|---|---|---|---|---|
| 1 | Deborah Font | Spain | 1:20.11 | Q, PR |
| 2 | Carla Casals | Spain | 1:21.40 | Q |
| 3 | Yuliya Volkova | Ukraine | 1:22.87 | Q |
| 4 | Patrycja Harajda | Poland | 1:27.57 | Q |
| 5 | Jacqueline Rennebohm | Canada | 1:35.68 | |

==== Heat 2 ====
| Rank | Name | Nationality | Time | Notes |
|---|---|---|---|---|
| 1 | Karolina Pelendritou | Cyprus | 1:16.82 | Q, WR |
| 2 | Sandra Gomez | Spain | 1:21.39 | Q |
| 3 | Yaryna Matlo | Ukraine | 1:23.15 | Q |
| 4 | Joanna Mendak | Poland | 1:25.81 | Q |
| 5 | Anabel Moro | Argentina | 1:28.35 | |
| 6 | Karina Petrikovicova | Slovakia | 1:35.25 | |

=== Final ===
Competed at 19:34.

| Rank | Name | Nationality | Time | Notes |
|---|---|---|---|---|
| 1st place, gold medalist(s) | Karolina Pelendritou | Cyprus | 1:17.58 | |
| 2nd place, silver medalist(s) | Sandra Gomez | Spain | 1:18.06 | |
| 3rd place, bronze medalist(s) | Yaryna Matlo | Ukraine | 1:19.53 | |
| 4 | Yuliya Volkova | Ukraine | 1:19.67 | |
| 5 | Deborah Font | Spain | 1:20.38 | |
| 6 | Carla Casals | Spain | 1:20.72 | |
| 7 | Joanna Mendak | Poland | 1:24.54 | |
| 8 | Patrycja Harajda | Poland | 1:28.81 | |

Q = qualified for final. WR = World Record. PR = Paralympic Record.
