= Swimming at the 2008 Summer Paralympics – Women's 200 metre individual medley SM12 =

Women's 200m Individual Medley SM12 at the XIII Paralympic Games
- Venue: Beijing National Aquatics Center
- Dates: 10 September
- Competitors: 12 from 7 nations
- Winning time: 2:30.55

Medalists
1st place, gold medalist(s)		Oxana Savchenko	Russia
2nd place, silver medalist(s)		Joanna Mendak	Poland
3rd place, bronze medalist(s)		Karolina Pelendritou	Cyprus

The women's 200m individual medley SM12 event at the 2008 Summer Paralympics took place at the Beijing National Aquatics Center on 10 September. There were two heats; the swimmers with the eight fastest times advanced to the final.

== Results ==
=== Heats ===
Competed from 10:03.

==== Heat 1 ====
Rank	Name	Nationality	Time	Notes
1	Joanna Mendak	Poland	2:39.91	Q
2	Karolina Pelendritou	Cyprus	2:42.65	Q
3	Yuliya Volkova	Ukraine	2:44.29	Q
4	Carla Casals	Spain	2:49.65	Q
5	Belkys Mota	Venezuela	2:52.44	
6	Valentina Rangel	Venezuela	3:23.63	

==== Heat 2 ====
Rank	Name	Nationality	Time	Notes
1	Oxana Savchenko	Russia	2:36.12	Q
2	Patrycja Harajda	Poland	2:43.07	Q
3	Ana Garcia-Arcicollar	Spain	2:43.38	Q
4	Amaya Alonso	Spain	2:47.51	Q
5	Yaryna Matlo	Ukraine	2:51.95	
6	Jacqueline Rennebohm	Canada	2:59.14	

=== Final ===
Competed at 18:39.

Rank	Name	Nationality	Time	Notes
1st place, gold medalist(s)	Oxana Savchenko	Russia	2:30.55	
2nd place, silver medalist(s)	Joanna Mendak	Poland	2:32.65	
3rd place, bronze medalist(s)	Karolina Pelendritou	Cyprus	2:35.30	
4	Ana Garcia-Arcicollar	Spain	2:35.64	
5	Yuliya Volkova	Ukraine	2:37.42	
6	Patrycja Harajda	Poland	2:40.37	
7	Carla Casals	Spain	2:44.73	
8	Amaya Alonso	Spain	2:48.71	

Q = qualified for final.
