= Swimming at the 2008 Summer Paralympics – Women's 50 metre freestyle S12 =

Women's 50m Freestyle S12 at the XIII Paralympic Games
- Venue: Beijing National Aquatics Center
- Dates: 14 September
- Competitors: 11 from 7 nations
- Winning time: 27.07

Medalists
1st place, gold medalist(s)		Oxana Savchenko	Russia
2nd place, silver medalist(s)		Anna Efimenko	Russia
3rd place, bronze medalist(s)		Deborah Font	Spain

The women's 50m freestyle S12 event at the 2008 Summer Paralympics took place at the Beijing National Aquatics Center on 14 September. There were two heats; the swimmers with the eight fastest times advanced to the final.

== Results ==
=== Heats ===
Competed from 09:18.

==== Heat 1 ====
Rank	Name	Nationality	Time	Notes
1	Ana Garcia-Arcicollar	Spain	29.00	Q
2	Yuliya Volkova	Ukraine	29.07	Q
3	Karolina Pelendritou	Cyprus	29.09	Q
4	Joanna Mendak	Poland	29.14	Q
5	Belkys Mota	Venezuela	30.28	Q

==== Heat 2 ====
Rank	Name	Nationality	Time	Notes
1	Oxana Savchenko	Russia	27.92	Q, WR
2	Deborah Font	Spain	28.93	Q
3	Anna Efimenko	Russia	29.42	Q
4	Patrycja Harajda	Poland	30.69	
5	Jacqueline Rennebohm	Canada	31.30	
6	Carla Casals	Spain	31.69	

=== Final ===
Competed at 17:15.

Rank	Name	Nationality	Time	Notes
1st place, gold medalist(s)	Oxana Savchenko	Russia	27.07	WR
2nd place, silver medalist(s)	Anna Efimenko	Russia	27.82	
3rd place, bronze medalist(s)	Deborah Font	Spain	28.23	
4	Joanna Mendak	Poland	28.34	
5	Karolina Pelendritou	Cyprus	28.72	
6	Yuliya Volkova	Ukraine	28.86	
7	Ana Garcia-Arcicollar	Spain	28.93	
8	Belkys Mota	Venezuela	30.43	

Q = qualified for final. WR = World Record.
