= Swimming at the 2004 Summer Paralympics – Women's 50 metre freestyle S12 =

Women's 50m Freestyle S12 at the XII Paralympic Games
- Paralympic Swimming
- Venue: Olympic Aquatic Centre
- Dates: 26 September 2004
- Competitors: 14 from 11 nations
- Winning time: 28.02

Medalists
1st place, gold medalist(s)		Zhu Hong Yan	China
2nd place, silver medalist(s)		Marge Kõrkjas	Estonia
3rd place, bronze medalist(s)		Yuliya Volkova	Ukraine

The Women's 50 metre freestyle S12 swimming event at the 2004 Summer Paralympics was competed on 26 September. It was won by Zhu Hong Yan, representing China.

== 1st round ==
Qualified for final round

Heat 1

26 Sept. 2004, morning session

Rank	Athlete	Time	Notes
1	Marge Kõrkjas (EST)	29.28	
2	Deborah Font (ESP)	29.97	
3	Trischa Zorn (USA)	30.83	
4	Carla Casals (ESP)	31.48	
5	Handri de Beer (RSA)	32.41	
6	Iryna Vasilenka (BLR)	32.97	
7	Lidia Banos (ESP)	33.09	

Heat 2

26 Sept. 2004, morning session

Rank	Athlete	Time	Notes
1	Zhu Hong Yan (CHN)	29.26	
2	Yuliya Volkova (UKR)	29.60	
3	Patrycja Harajda (POL)	30.01	
4	Joanna Mendak (POL)	30.74	
5	Jemma Houghton (GBR)	32.48	
6	Hu Hsin Chung (TPE)	32.74	
7	Mikaella Spantiou (CYP)	32.92	

== Final round ==
26 Sept. 2004, evening session

Rank	Athlete	Time	Notes
1st place, gold medalist(s)	Zhu Hong Yan (CHN)	28.02	WR
2nd place, silver medalist(s)	Marge Kõrkjas (EST)	28.74	
3rd place, bronze medalist(s)	Yuliya Volkova (UKR)	29.14	
4	Joanna Mendak (POL)	29.55	
5	Deborah Font (ESP)	29.80	
6	Patrycja Harajda (POL)	30.07	
7	Trischa Zorn (USA)	30.78	
8	Carla Casals (ESP)	31.50	
