= Swimming at the 2004 Summer Paralympics – Women's 200 metre individual medley SM12 =

Women's 200m Individual Medley SM12 at the XII Paralympic Games
- Paralympic Swimming
- Venue: Olympic Aquatic Centre
- Dates: 22 September 2004
- Competitors: 10 from 7 nations
- Winning time: 2:30.09

Medalists
1st place, gold medalist(s)		Zhu Hong Yan	China
2nd place, silver medalist(s)		Patrycja Harajda	Poland
3rd place, bronze medalist(s)		Deborah Font	Spain

The Women's 200 metre individual medley SM12 swimming event at the 2004 Summer Paralympics was competed on 22 September. It was won by Zhu Hong Yan, representing China.

== 1st round ==
Qualified for final round

Heat 1

22 Sept. 2004, morning session

Rank	Athlete	Time	Notes
1	Ana Garcia-Arcicollar (ESP)	2:44.63	
2	Joanna Mendak (POL)	2:46.85	
3	Yuliya Volkova (UKR)	2:54.71	
4	Iryna Vasilenka (BLR)	3:02.06	
5	Handri de Beer (RSA)	3:02.64	

Heat 2

22 Sept. 2004, morning session

Rank	Athlete	Time	Notes
1	Zhu Hong Yan (CHN)	2:36.61	
2	Deborah Font (ESP)	2:42.43	
3	Patrycja Harajda (POL)	2:42.58	
4	Trischa Zorn (USA)	2:47.49	
5	Carla Casals (ESP)	2:57.11	

== Final round ==
22 Sept. 2004, evening session

Rank	Athlete	Time	Notes
1st place, gold medalist(s)	Zhu Hong Yan (CHN)	2:30.09	WR
2nd place, silver medalist(s)	Patrycja Harajda (POL)	2:40.76	
3rd place, bronze medalist(s)	Deborah Font (ESP)	2:41.08	
4	Joanna Mendak (POL)	2:41.15	
5	Ana Garcia-Arcicollar (ESP)	2:42.96	
6	Trischa Zorn (USA)	2:46.52	
7	Yuliya Volkova (UKR)	2:59.42	
8	Carla Casals (ESP)	2:59.73	
