= Swimming at the 2004 Summer Paralympics – Women's 100 metre breaststroke SB12 =

Women's 100m Breaststroke SB12 at the XII Paralympic Games
- Paralympic Swimming
- Venue: Olympic Aquatic Centre
- Dates: 20 September 2004
- Competitors: 12 from 9 nations
- Winning time: 1:21.41

Medalists
1st place, gold medalist(s)		Sandra Gómez Pérez	Spain
2nd place, silver medalist(s)		Deborah Font	Spain
3rd place, bronze medalist(s)		Yuliya Volkova	Ukraine

The Women's 100 metre breaststroke SB12 swimming event at the 2004 Summer Paralympics was competed on 20 September. It was won by Sandra Gómez Pérez, representing Spain.

== 1st round ==
Qualified for final round

Heat 1

20 Sept. 2004, morning session

Rank	Athlete	Time	Notes
1	Sandra Gómez Pérez (ESP)	1:21.97	WR
2	Yuliya Volkova (UKR)	1:25.82	
3	Cong Rui (CHN)	1:29.41	
4	Iryna Vasilenka (BLR)	1:29.51	
5	Anabel Moro (ARG)	1:32.58	
6	Valentina Rangel (VEN)	1:38.92	

Heat 2

20 Sept. 2004, morning session

Rank	Athlete	Time	Notes
1	Deborah Font (ESP)	1:23.61	
2	Joanna Mendak (POL)	1:25.77	
3	Zhu Hong Yan (CHN)	1:27.23	
4	Carla Casals (ESP)	1:31.03	
5	Hu Hsin Chung (TPE)	1:34.00	
6	Natalya Maximova (KAZ)	1:40.18	

== Final round ==
20 Sept. 2004, evening session

Rank	Athlete	Time	Notes
1st place, gold medalist(s)	Sandra Gómez Pérez (ESP)	1:21.41	WR
2nd place, silver medalist(s)	Deborah Font (ESP)	1:23.63	
3rd place, bronze medalist(s)	Yuliya Volkova (UKR)	1:25.17	
4	Cong Rui (CHN)	1:26.18	
5	Joanna Mendak (POL)	1:26.24	
6	Zhu Hong Yan (CHN)	1:26.48	
7	Iryna Vasilenka (BLR)	1:28.67	
8	Carla Casals (ESP)	1:31.58	
