= Swimming at the 2004 Summer Paralympics – Women's 100 metre backstroke S12 =

Women's 100m Backstroke S12 at the XII Paralympic Games
- Paralympic Swimming
- Venue: Olympic Aquatic Centre
- Dates: 25 September 2004
- Competitors: 8 from 6 nations
- Winning time: 1:08.89

Medalists
1st place, gold medalist(s)		Zhu Hong Yan	China
2nd place, silver medalist(s)		Patrycja Harajda	Poland
3rd place, bronze medalist(s)		Trischa Zorn	United States

The Women's 100 metre backstroke S12 swimming event at the 2004 Summer Paralympics was competed on 25 September. It was won by Zhu Hong Yan, representing China.

== Final round ==
25 Sept. 2004, evening session

Rank	Athlete	Time	Notes
1st place, gold medalist(s)	Zhu Hong Yan (CHN)	1:08.89	WR
2nd place, silver medalist(s)	Patrycja Harajda (POL)	1:14.18	
3rd place, bronze medalist(s)	Trischa Zorn (USA)	1:14.99	
4	Ana Garcia-Arcicollar (ESP)	1:15.82	
5	Joanna Mendak (POL)	1:18.40	
6	Sandra Gomez (ESP)	1:18.74	
7	Iryna Vasilenka (BLR)	1:23.39	
	Mikaella Spantiou (CYP)	DNF	
