= Swimming at the 2004 Summer Paralympics – Women's 100 metre freestyle S12 =

Women's 100m Freestyle S12 at the XII Paralympic Games
- Paralympic Swimming
- Venue: Olympic Aquatic Centre
- Dates: 24 September 2004
- Competitors: 12 from 9 nations
- Winning time: 1:01.99

Medalists
| 1st place, gold medalist(s) | | Zhu Hong Yan | China |
| 2nd place, silver medalist(s) | | Patrycja Harajda | Poland |
| 3rd place, bronze medalist(s) | | Joanna Mendak | Poland |

The Women's 100 metre freestyle S12 swimming event at the 2004 Summer Paralympics was competed on 24 September. It was won by Zhu Hong Yan, representing China.

== 1st round ==
| Qualified for final round |

Heat 1

24 Sept. 2004, morning session

| Rank | Athlete | Time | Notes |
|---|---|---|---|
| 1 | Patrycja Harajda (POL) | 1:03.88 | |
| 2 | Yuliya Volkova (UKR) | 1:05.35 | |
| 3 | Deborah Font (ESP) | 1:05.37 | |
| 4 | Trischa Zorn (USA) | 1:07.95 | |
| 5 | Carla Casals (ESP) | 1:08.91 | |
| 6 | Handri de Beer (RSA) | 1:09.49 | |

Heat 2

24 Sept. 2004, morning session

| Rank | Athlete | Time | Notes |
|---|---|---|---|
| 1 | Zhu Hong Yan (CHN) | 1:04.15 | |
| 2 | Joanna Mendak (POL) | 1:04.72 | |
| 3 | Marge Kõrkjas (EST) | 1:05.86 | |
| 4 | Jemma Houghton (GBR) | 1:08.43 | |
| 5 | Lidia Banos (ESP) | 1:09.42 | |
| 6 | Hu Hsin Chung (TPE) | 1:12.17 | |

== Final round ==
24 Sept. 2004, evening session

| Rank | Athlete | Time | Notes |
|---|---|---|---|
| 1st place, gold medalist(s) | Zhu Hong Yan (CHN) | 1:01.99 | |
| 2nd place, silver medalist(s) | Patrycja Harajda (POL) | 1:03.52 | |
| 3rd place, bronze medalist(s) | Joanna Mendak (POL) | 1:04.33 | |
| 4 | Deborah Font (ESP) | 1:04.39 | |
| 5 | Yuliya Volkova (UKR) | 1:04.63 | |
| 6 | Marge Kõrkjas (EST) | 1:05.19 | |
| 7 | Trischa Zorn (USA) | 1:07.58 | |
| 8 | Jemma Houghton (GBR) | 1:08.73 | |
