= Swimming at the 2012 Summer Paralympics – Women's 100 metre butterfly S12 =

Women's 100 metre butterfly S12 at the XIV Paralympic Games
- Venue: London Aquatics Centre
- Dates: 2 September
- Competitors: 8 from 7 nations

Medalists
1st place, gold medalist(s)		Joanna Mendak	Poland
2nd place, silver medalist(s)		Darya Stukalova	Russia
3rd place, bronze medalist(s)		Hannah Russell	Great Britain

The women's 100 metre butterfly S12 event at the 2012 Paralympic Games took place on 2 September, at the London Aquatics Centre in the Olympic Park, London. The event was for athletes included in the S12 classification, which is for competitors with visual impairments. Eight swimmers took part, representing a total of seven different nations. Poland's Joanna Mendak won the gold medal.

== Results ==
Eight swimmers were involved in the competition which progressed directly to a final with no heats contested.

Rank	Lane	Name	Nationality	Time	Notes
1st place, gold medalist(s)	4	Joanna Mendak	Poland	1:06.16	
2nd place, silver medalist(s)	5	Darya Stukalova	Russia	1:06.27	
3rd place, bronze medalist(s)	3	Hannah Russell	Great Britain	1:08.57	
4	6	Carla Casals	Spain	1:10.44	
5	8	Belkys Mota	Venezuela	1:12.85	
6	1	Amaya Alonso	Spain	1:13.75	
7	2	Naomi Maike Schnittger	Germany	1:16.70	
8	7	Yaryna Matlo	Ukraine	1:17.49	
