= Swimming at the 2008 Summer Paralympics – Women's 100 metre butterfly S12 =

Women's 100m Butterfly S12 at the XIII Paralympic Games
- Venue: Beijing National Aquatics Center
- Dates: 9 September
- Competitors: 9 from 5 nations
- Winning time: 1:03.34

Medalists
1st place, gold medalist(s)		Joanna Mendak	Poland
2nd place, silver medalist(s)		Ana Garcia-Arcicollar	Spain
3rd place, bronze medalist(s)		Yuliya Volkova	Ukraine

The women's 100m butterfly S12 event at the 2008 Summer Paralympics took place at the Beijing National Aquatics Center on 9 September. There were two heats; the swimmers with the eight fastest times advanced to the final.

== Results ==
=== Heats ===
Competed from 09:55.

==== Heat 1 ====
Rank	Name	Nationality	Time	Notes
1	Ana Garcia-Arcicollar	Spain	1:09.56	Q
2	Patrycja Harajda	Poland	1:15.87	Q
3	Yuliya Volkova	Ukraine	1:16.06	Q
4	Jacqueline Rennebohm	Canada	1:19.58	

==== Heat 2 ====
Rank	Name	Nationality	Time	Notes
1	Joanna Mendak	Poland	1:06.28	Q
2	Carla Casals	Spain	1:13.46	Q
3	Belkys Mota	Venezuela	1:13.95	Q
4	Amaya Alonso	Spain	1:16.13	Q
5	Yaryna Matlo	Ukraine	1:18.25	Q

=== Final ===
Competed at 18:10.

Rank	Name	Nationality	Time	Notes
1st place, gold medalist(s)	Joanna Mendak	Poland	1:03.34	PR
2nd place, silver medalist(s)	Ana Garcia-Arcicollar	Spain	1:08.86	
3rd place, bronze medalist(s)	Yuliya Volkova	Ukraine	1:10.89	
4	Carla Casals	Spain	1:11.94	
5	Belkys Mota	Venezuela	1:12.49	
6	Amaya Alonso	Spain	1:15.09	
7	Patrycja Harajda	Poland	1:15.22	
8	Yaryna Matlo	Ukraine	1:17.28	

Q = qualified for final. PR = Paralympic Record.
