= Swimming at the 2004 Summer Paralympics – Women's 100 metre butterfly S12 =

Women's 100m Butterfly S12 at the XII Paralympic Games
- Paralympic Swimming
- Venue: Olympic Aquatic Centre
- Dates: 21 September 2004
- Competitors: 10 from 7 nations
- Winning time: 1:04.87

Medalists
1st place, gold medalist(s)		Joanna Mendak	Poland
2nd place, silver medalist(s)		Zhu Hong Yan	China
3rd place, bronze medalist(s)		Ana Garcia-Arcicollar	Spain

The Women's 100 metre butterfly S12 swimming event at the 2004 Summer Paralympics was competed on 21 September. It was won by Joanna Mendak, representing Poland.

== 1st round ==
Qualified for final round

Heat 1

21 Sept. 2004, morning session

Rank	Athlete	Time	Notes
1	Zhu Hong Yan (CHN)	1:06.65	PR
2	Handri de Beer (RSA)	1:16.85	
3	Jemma Houghton (GBR)	1:17.03	
4	Sandra Gomez (ESP)	1:22.06	
5	Hu Hsin Chung (TPE)	1:22.67	

Heat 2

21 Sept. 2004, morning session

Rank	Athlete	Time	Notes
1	Joanna Mendak (POL)	1:07.17	
2	Ana Garcia-Arcicollar (ESP)	1:14.73	
3	Lidia Banos (ESP)	1:23.79	
4	Marge Kõrkjas (EST)	1:23.91	
5	Elaine Barrett (GBR)	1:24.01	

== Final round ==
21 Sept. 2004, evening session

Rank	Athlete	Time	Notes
1st place, gold medalist(s)	Joanna Mendak (POL)	1:04.87	WR
2nd place, silver medalist(s)	Zhu Hong Yan (CHN)	1:06.61	
3rd place, bronze medalist(s)	Ana Garcia-Arcicollar (ESP)	1:12.83	
4	Jemma Houghton (GBR)	1:16.16	
5	Handri de Beer (RSA)	1:16.79	
6	Sandra Gomez (ESP)	1:20.20	
7	Lidia Banos (ESP)	1:23.02	
8	Hu Hsin Chung (TPE)	1:23.33	
