= Swimming at the 2004 Summer Paralympics – Women's 400 metre freestyle S12 =

Women's 400m Freestyle S12 at the XII Paralympic Games
- Paralympic Swimming
- Venue: Olympic Aquatic Centre
- Dates: 19 September 2004
- Competitors: 8 from 5 nations
- Winning time: 4:51.20

Medalists
1st place, gold medalist(s)		Ana Garcia-Arcicollar	Spain
2nd place, silver medalist(s)		Deborah Font	Spain
3rd place, bronze medalist(s)		Yuliya Volkova	Ukraine

The Women's 400 metre freestyle S12 swimming event at the 2004 Summer Paralympics was competed on 19 September. It was won by Ana Garcia-Arcicollar, representing Spain.

== Final round ==
19 Sept. 2004, evening session

Rank	Athlete	Time	Notes
1st place, gold medalist(s)	Ana Garcia-Arcicollar (ESP)	4:51.20	WR
2nd place, silver medalist(s)	Deborah Font (ESP)	4:52.16	
3rd place, bronze medalist(s)	Yuliya Volkova (UKR)	5:02.42	
4	Patrycja Harajda (POL)	5:08.29	
5	Lidia Banos (ESP)	5:09.26	
6	Jemma Houghton (GBR)	5:13.45	
7	Handri de Beer (RSA)	5:23.99	
8	Elaine Barrett (GBR)	6:05.69	
