= Swimming at the 2004 Summer Paralympics – Men's 50 metre breaststroke SB3 =

Men's 50m Breaststroke SB3 at the XII Paralympic Games
- Paralympic Swimming
- Venue: Olympic Aquatic Centre
- Dates: 23 September 2004
- Competitors: 11 from 9 nations
- Winning time: 51.27

Medalists
1st place, gold medalist(s)		Miguel Luque	Spain
2nd place, silver medalist(s)		Vicente Gil	Spain
3rd place, bronze medalist(s)		Hiroshi Karube	Japan

The Men's 50 metre breaststroke SB3 swimming event at the 2004 Summer Paralympics was competed on 23 September. It was won by Miguel Luque, representing Spain.

== 1st round ==
Qualified for final round

Heat 1

23 Sept. 2004, morning session

Rank	Athlete	Time	Notes
1	Vicente Gil (ESP)	54.32	
2	Emilio Montiel (MEX)	57.53	
3	Thomas Rosenberger (AUT)	57.66	
4	Jan Povysil (CZE)	58.74	
5	Ari Ahonen (FIN)	1:08.90	

Heat 2

23 Sept. 2004, morning session

Rank	Athlete	Time	Notes
1	Miguel Luque (ESP)	52.81	
2	Hiroshi Karube (JPN)	54.78	
3	Javier Torres (ESP)	56.46	
4	Sanit Songnork (THA)	58.20	
5	Lee Hyung Yong (KOR)	1:00.91	
6	Kestutis Skucas (LTU)	1:06.74	

== Final round ==
23 Sept. 2004, evening session

Rank	Athlete	Time	Notes
1st place, gold medalist(s)	Miguel Luque (ESP)	51.27	
2nd place, silver medalist(s)	Vicente Gil (ESP)	55.03	
3rd place, bronze medalist(s)	Hiroshi Karube (JPN)	55.18	
4	Javier Torres (ESP)	55.35	
5	Emilio Montiel (MEX)	56.91	
6	Thomas Rosenberger (AUT)	57.53	
7	Sanit Songnork (THA)	57.55	
8	Jan Povysil (CZE)	59.16	
