= Swimming at the 2008 Summer Paralympics – Men's 100 metre breaststroke SB12 =

Men's 100m Breaststroke SB12 at the XIII Paralympic Games
- Venue: Beijing National Aquatics Center
- Dates: 8 September
- Competitors: 11 from 7 nations
- Winning time: 1:07.46

Medalists
1st place, gold medalist(s)		Maksym Veraksa	Ukraine
2nd place, silver medalist(s)		Sergei Punko	Belarus
3rd place, bronze medalist(s)		Sergii Klippert	Ukraine

The men's 100m breaststroke SB12 event at the 2008 Summer Paralympics took place at the Beijing National Aquatics Center on 8 September. There were two heats; the swimmers with the eight fastest times advanced to the final.

== Results ==
=== Heats ===
Competed from 10:28.

==== Heat 1 ====
Rank	Name	Nationality	Time	Notes
1	Sergei Punko	Belarus	1:12.18	Q
2	Sergii Klippert	Ukraine	1:12.65	Q
3	Israel Oliver	Spain	1:14.45	Q
4	Daniel Llambrich	Spain	1:15.13	Q
5	Kitipong Sriboonrueng	Thailand	1:18.56	

==== Heat 2 ====
Rank	Name	Nationality	Time	Notes
1	Maksym Veraksa	Ukraine	1:08.55	Q, WR
2	Robert Musiorski	Poland	1:14.79	Q
3	Enrique Floriano	Spain	1:14.97	Q
4	Yury Rudzenok	Belarus	1:15.45	Q
5	Jeremy McClure	Australia	1:19.96	
6	Pedro Gonzalez	Venezuela	1:25.96	

=== Final ===
Competed at 19:29.

Rank	Name	Nationality	Time	Notes
1st place, gold medalist(s)	Maksym Veraksa	Ukraine	1:07.46	WR
2nd place, silver medalist(s)	Sergei Punko	Belarus	1:09.71	
3rd place, bronze medalist(s)	Sergii Klippert	Ukraine	1:09.83	
4	Enrique Floriano	Spain	1:12.27	
5	Israel Oliver	Spain	1:13.31	
6	Yury Rudzenok	Belarus	1:15.23	
7	Robert Musiorski	Poland	1:15.39	
	Daniel Llambrich	Spain		DQ

Q = qualified for final. WR = World Record. DQ = Disqualified.
