= Swimming at the 2008 Summer Paralympics – Men's 400 metre freestyle S12 =

Men's 400m Freestyle S12 at the XIII Paralympic Games
- Venue: Beijing National Aquatics Center
- Dates: 11 September
- Competitors: 10 from 6 nations
- Winning time: 4:08.64

Medalists
1st place, gold medalist(s)		Sergei Punko	Belarus
2nd place, silver medalist(s)		Enrique Floriano	Spain
3rd place, bronze medalist(s)		Sergii Klippert	Ukraine

The men's 400m freestyle S12 event at the 2008 Summer Paralympics took place at the Beijing National Aquatics Center on 11 September. There were two heats; the swimmers with the eight fastest times advanced to the final.

== Results ==
=== Heats ===
Competed from 11:06.

==== Heat 1 ====
Rank	Name	Nationality	Time	Notes
1	Enrique Floriano	Spain	4:22.64	Q
2	Tucker Dupree	United States	4:24.95	Q
3	Alessandro Serpico	Italy	4:31.38	Q
4	Ignacio Gonzalez	Argentina	4:42.95	Q
5	Anton Stabrovskyy	Ukraine	5:00.76	

==== Heat 2 ====
Rank	Name	Nationality	Time	Notes
1	Sergei Punko	Belarus	4:31.11	Q
2	Sergii Klippert	Ukraine	4:32.24	Q
3	Juan Diego Gil	Spain	4:40.31	Q
4	Omar Font	Spain	4:46.22	Q

=== Final ===
Competed at 18:59.

Rank	Name	Nationality	Time	Notes
1st place, gold medalist(s)	Sergei Punko	Belarus	4:08.64	WR
2nd place, silver medalist(s)	Enrique Floriano	Spain	4:15.89	
3rd place, bronze medalist(s)	Sergii Klippert	Ukraine	4:19.46	
4	Tucker Dupree	United States	4:23.98	
5	Alessandro Serpico	Italy	4:32.03	
6	Juan Diego Gil	Spain	4:32.43	
7	Omar Font	Spain	4:35.64	
8	Ignacio Gonzalez	Argentina	4:44.78	

Q = qualified for final. WR = World Record.
