= Swimming at the 2008 Summer Paralympics – Women's 100 metre breaststroke SB9 =

Women's 100m Breaststroke SB9 at the XIII Paralympic Games
- Venue: Beijing National Aquatics Center
- Dates: 10 September
- Competitors: 10 from 8 nations
- Winning time: 1:22.58

Medalists
1st place, gold medalist(s)		Sophie Pascoe	New Zealand
2nd place, silver medalist(s)		Sarai Gascón Moreno	Spain
3rd place, bronze medalist(s)		Louise Watkin	Great Britain

The women's 100m breaststroke SB9 event at the 2008 Summer Paralympics took place at the Beijing National Aquatics Center on 10 September. There were two heats; the swimmers with the eight fastest times advanced to the final.

== Results ==
=== Heats ===
Competed from 09:07.

==== Heat 1 ====
Rank	Name	Nationality	Time	Notes
1	Kate Grey	Great Britain	1:25.83	Q
2	Sarai Gascón Moreno	Spain	1:26.49	Q
3	Qian Huiyu	China	1:26.62	Q
4	Louise Watkin	Great Britain	1:27.79	Q
5	Ana Rubio Zavala	Spain	1:29.40	

==== Heat 2 ====
Rank	Name	Nationality	Time	Notes
1	Sophie Pascoe	New Zealand	1:24.54	Q
2	Maud Didier	France	1:26.17	Q
3	Daniela Gimenez	Argentina	1:27.04	Q
4	Yulia Nikitina	Russia	1:27.86	Q
5	Viera Mikulasikova	Slovakia	1:29.57	

=== Final ===
Competed at 17:05.

Rank	Name	Nationality	Time	Notes
1st place, gold medalist(s)	Sophie Pascoe	New Zealand	1:22.58	
2nd place, silver medalist(s)	Sarai Gascón	Spain	1:24.51	
3rd place, bronze medalist(s)	Louise Watkin	Great Britain	1:26.10	
4	Qian Huiyu	China	1:26.33	
5	Kate Grey	Great Britain	1:26.35	
6	Maud Didier	France	1:26.56	
7	Daniela Gimenez	Argentina	1:26.81	
8	Yulia Nikitina	Russia	1:27.28	

Q = qualified for final.
