= Vicente Gil Ros =

Spanish Paralympic swimmer

Vicente Gil
Personal information
- Full name: Vicente Gil Ros
- Nationality: Spanish
- Born: 5 January 1976 (age 50) Carpesa, Valencia, Spain

Sport
- Country: Spain
- Sport: Swimming (S12)
Medal record
Men's swimming
Representing Spain
Paralympic Games
Gold medal – first place	2000 Sydney	4x50 m medley 20 pts
Silver medal – second place	2004 Athens	50 m breaststroke SB3
Silver medal – second place	2008 Beijing	50 m breaststroke SB3
Bronze medal – third place	2008 Beijing	4x50 m medley 20 pts
World Championships
Silver medal – second place	2002 Mar del Plata	50 m breaststroke SB3
Bronze medal – third place	2006 Durban	50 m breaststroke SB3
European Championships
Silver medal – second place	2026 Kocaeli	50 m breaststroke SB3

Vicente Gil Ros (born 5 January 1976) is an S5 swimmer from Spain.

== Personal ==
Gil was born 5 January 1976 in Carpesa, Valencia.

== Career ==
Gil is an S5 swimmer.

In 2010, Gil raced at the Tenerife International Open. He raced at the 2011 IPC European Swimming Championships in Berlin, Germany. In March 2013, he participated in a dualathlon event as part of a relay team, with Fátima Sánchez Marrero his teammate.

Gil competed at the 2000 Summer Paralympics, 2004 Summer Paralympics, 2008 Summer Paralympics and 2012 Summer Paralympics. He earned a silver medal at the 2004 and 2008 Games in the SB3 50 meter breaststroke. He won a bronze medal in the 4 x 50 meter 20 Points medley race at the 2008 Games.
