= Swimming at the 2008 Summer Paralympics – Men's 150 metre individual medley SM4 =

Men's 150m Individual Medley SM4 at the XIII Paralympic Games
- Venue: Beijing National Aquatics Center
- Dates: 14 September
- Competitors: 11 from 10 nations
- Winning time: 2:33.57

Medalists
1st place, gold medalist(s)		Cameron Leslie	New Zealand
2nd place, silver medalist(s)		Vicente Javier Torres	Spain
3rd place, bronze medalist(s)		Takayuki Suzuki	Japan

The men's 150m individual medley SM4 event at the 2008 Summer Paralympics took place at the Beijing National Aquatics Center on 14 September. There were two heats; the swimmers with the eight fastest times advanced to the final.

== Results ==
=== Heats ===
Competed from 09:23.

==== Heat 1 ====
Rank	Name	Nationality	Time	Notes
1	Miguel Luque	Spain	2:48.08	Q
2	David Smétanine	France	2:54.70	Q
3	Sebastian Ramirez	Argentina	3:00.45	Q
4	Moises Batista	Brazil	3:08.13	
	Somchai Duangkeaw	Thailand		DQ

==== Heat 2 ====
Rank	Name	Nationality	Time	Notes
1	Cameron Leslie	New Zealand	2:40.43	Q
2	Takayuki Suzuki	Japan	2:44.91	Q
3	Vicente Javier Torres	Spain	2:46.89	Q
4	Filippo Bonacini	Italy	2:58.06	Q
5	Stylianos Tsakonas	Greece	3:00.27	Q
6	Nelson Lopes	Portugal	3:15.06	

=== Final ===
Competed at 17:36.

Rank	Name	Nationality	Time	Notes
1st place, gold medalist(s)	Cameron Leslie	New Zealand	2:33.57	WR
2nd place, silver medalist(s)	Vicente Javier Torres	Spain	2:40.91	
3rd place, bronze medalist(s)	Takayuki Suzuki	Japan	2:41.11	
4	Miguel Luque	Spain	2:45.67	
5	David Smétanine	France	2:46.19	
6	Filippo Bonacini	Italy	2:53.49	
7	Stylianos Tsakonas	Greece	2:57.99	
8	Sebastian Ramirez	Argentina	3:01.69	

Q = qualified for final. WR = World Record. DQ = Disqualified.
