= Kate Grey =

British swimmer (born 1991)

Personal information
- Born: 25 January 1991 (age 35) Bristol, Great Britain
- Height: 170 cm (5 ft 7 in)
- Weight: 65 kg (143 lb)

Sport
- Country: United Kingdom
- Sport: Paralympic swimming
- Disability class: S9
- Club: TeamBath
Medal record
Paralympic swimming
Representing United Kingdom
World Championships
Silver medal – second place	2006 Durban	4x100m medley relay 34pts

Kate Grey (born 25 January 1991) is a British retired Paralympic swimmer who competed at international swimming competitions. She is a World silver medalist and has competed at the 2008 Summer Paralympics where she finished fifth in the 100m breaststroke SB9 final.

Grey had her left hand amputated after she put her hand in a sausage maker when she was two years old.

Grey works as a sports broadcaster covering Paralympics and women's sports.
