= Athletics at the 2008 Summer Paralympics – women's discus throw F12–13 =

The women's discus throw F11-12 had its final held on September 16 at 17:13.

== Medalists ==
Gold	Tamara Sivakova; Belarus
Silver	Zhang Liangmin; China
Bronze	Elizabeth Almada; Argentina

== Results ==
Place	Athlete	Class	1	2	3	4	5	6	Best	Points
1	Tamara Sivakova (BLR)	F12	x	41.29	40.14	x	x	38.16	41.29	970
2	Zhang Liangmin (CHN)	F12	38.19	40.35	39.73	x	x	33.87	40.35	948
3	Elizabeth Almada (ARG)	F12	36.98	37.85	38.03	36.69	37.17	35.35	38.03	894
4	Siena Christen (GER)	F12	x	36.60	x	x	x	x	36.60	860
5	Claire Williams (GBR)	F12	33.93	33.90	32.70	35.01	x	x	35.01	823
6	Tang Hongxia (CHN)	F12	29.17	33.88	x	33.43	30.39	x	33.88	796
7	Jessica Castellano (ESP)	F12	9.74	32.72	29.57	x	28.51	x	32.72	769
8	Maria Martinez (ESP)	F12	31.65	31.81	28.82	32.14	x	x	32.14	755
9	Marija Ivekovic (CRO)	F12	31.76	x	31.16				31.76	746
