= Swimming at the 2008 Summer Paralympics – Men's 100 metre breaststroke SB8 =

Men's 100m Breaststroke SB8 at the XIII Paralympic Games
- Venue: Beijing National Aquatics Center
- Dates: 9 September
- Competitors: 13 from 12 nations
- Winning time: 1:07.01

Medalists
1st place, gold medalist(s)		Andriy Kalyna	Ukraine
2nd place, silver medalist(s)		Wang Xiaofu	China
3rd place, bronze medalist(s)		Alejandro Sanchez	Spain

The men's 100m breaststroke SB8 event at the 2008 Summer Paralympics took place at the Beijing National Aquatics Center on 9 September. There were two heats; the swimmers with the eight fastest times advanced to the final.

== Results ==
=== Heats ===
Competed from 10:36.

==== Heat 1 ====
Rank	Name	Nationality	Time	Notes
1	Wang Xiaofu	China	1:15.03	Q
2	Krzysztof Paterka	Poland	1:15.80	Q
3	Andreas Daniel Onea	Austria	1:17.76	Q
3	Takuro Yamada	Japan	1:17.76	Q
5	Jarrett Perry	United States	1:19.44	Q
6	Joe Barker	Canada	1:21.52	

==== Heat 2 ====
Rank	Name	Nationality	Time	Notes
1	Andriy Kalyna	Ukraine	1:12.86	Q
2	Alejandro Sanchez	Spain	1:14.61	Q
3	Sam Hynd	Great Britain	1:17.00	Q
4	Tian Hengheng	China	1:21.83	
5	Quang Vuong Nguyen	Vietnam	1:23.46	
6	Facundo Lazo	Argentina	1:24.95	
7	David Taylor	Barbados	2:24.90	

=== Final ===
Competed at 20:05.

Rank	Name	Nationality	Time	Notes
1st place, gold medalist(s)	Andriy Kalyna	Ukraine	1:07.01	WR
2nd place, silver medalist(s)	Wang Xiaofu	China	1:12.39	
3rd place, bronze medalist(s)	Alejandro Sanchez	Spain	1:13.44	
4	Krzysztof Paterka	Poland	1:14.24	
5	Sam Hynd	Great Britain	1:15.29	
6	Andreas Daniel Onea	Austria	1:17.71	
7	Takuro Yamada	Japan	1:18.40	
8	Jarrett Perry	United States	1:20.64	

Q = qualified for final. WR = World Record.
