= Argentina at the 2008 Summer Paralympics =

- IPC code: ARG
- NPC: Argentine Paralympic Committee
- Website: www.coparg.org.ar

in Beijing
- Competitors: 42 in 8 sports
- Flag bearer: Silvio Velo
- Medals Ranked 58th: Gold 0 Silver 1 Bronze 5 Total 6

Summer Paralympics appearances (overview)
- 1960; 1964; 1968; 1972; 1976; 1980; 1984; 1988; 1992; 1996; 2000; 2004; 2008; 2012; 2016; 2020; 2024

Argentina sent a delegation to compete at the 2008 Summer Paralympics in Beijing. The country's flagbearer at the Games' opening ceremony was football player Silvio Velo.

== Medalists ==
Medal	Name	Sport	Event
Silver	Sebastian Baldassarri	Athletics	Men's Discus Throw F11/12
Bronze	Elizabeth Almada	Athletics	Women's Discus Throw F12/13
Bronze	Guillermo Marro	Swimming	Men's 100m Backstroke S7
Bronze	Fabian Ramirez	Judo	Men -73 kg
Bronze	Jorge Lencina	Judo	Men -81 kg
Bronze	Gonzalo Abbas Hachache; Diego Cerega; Eduardo Diaz; Ivan Figueroa; Jose Luis Jiminez; Dario Aldo Lencina; Gustavo Maidana; Antonio Mendoza; Lucas Rodríguez; Silvio Mauricio Velo	Football 5-a-side	Men's team

== Sports ==
=== Athletics ===
==== Men's track ====
Athlete	Class	Event	Heats		Semifinal		Final	
Athlete	Class	Event	Result	Rank	Result	Rank	Result	Rank
Mariano Dominguez	T37	100m	12.85	15	did not advance			
Mariano Dominguez	T37	200m	26.41	16	did not advance			
Alejandro Maldonado	T54	800m	1:40.22	15 q	1:40.62	14	did not advance	
Alejandro Maldonado	T54	1500m	3:14.21	19 Q	3:09.31	6 Q	3:14.92	4
Federico Rodriguez	T12	100m	11.67	18	did not advance			
Federico Rodriguez	T12	200m	23.91	20	did not advance			
Lucas Schoenfeld	T46	100m	11.68	15	did not advance			

==== Men's field ====
Athlete	Class	Event	Final		
Athlete	Class	Event	Result	Points	Rank
Sebastian Baldassarri	F11-12	Discus throw	40.43	988	2nd place, silver medalist(s)
Sebastian Baldassarri	F11-12	Shot put	11.11	804	8
Lucas Schoenfeld	F46	Long jump	NMR		

==== Women's track ====
Athlete	Class	Event	Heats		Semifinal		Final	
Athlete	Class	Event	Result	Rank	Result	Rank	Result	Rank
Gracia Sosa	T11	100m	DSQ		did not advance			
Gracia Sosa	T11	200m	29.35	10	did not advance			

==== Women's field ====
Athlete	Class	Event	Final		
Athlete	Class	Event	Result	Points	Rank
Elizabeth Almada	F12-13	Discus throw	38.03	894	3rd place, bronze medalist(s)
Elizabeth Almada	F12-13	Shot put	10.74	861	6
Perla Munoz	F35-36	Discus throw	17.74	739	8
Perla Munoz	F35-36	Shot put	7.13 SB	764	8

=== Boccia ===
Athlete	Event	Preliminaries			Quarterfinals	Semifinals	Final	
Athlete	Event	Opponent	Opposition Score	Rank	Opposition Score	Opposition Score	Opposition Score	Rank
Mauricio Ibarbure	Mixed individual BC1	Shelly (IRL)	L 2-3	4	did not advance			
Mauricio Ibarbure	Mixed individual BC1	Park J S (KOR)	L 2-5	4	did not advance			
Mauricio Ibarbure	Mixed individual BC1	Richardson (CAN)	L 4-7	4	did not advance			
Mauricio Ibarbure	Mixed individual BC1	Kitani (JPN)	W 6-2	4	did not advance			
Gabriela Villano	Mixed individual BC1	Beltran (ESP)	L 0-14	3	did not advance			
Gabriela Villano	Mixed individual BC1	Wang Y (CHN)	L 1-6	3	did not advance			
Gabriela Villano	Mixed individual BC1	Mawji (CAN)	W 6-1	3	did not advance			
Gabriela Villano	Mixed individual BC1	Hawker (USA)	W 3-1	3	did not advance			
Pablo Cortez	Mixed individual BC2	Cao (CHN)	W 5-2	1 Q	F Ferreira (POR); W 5-2	Murray (GBR); L 1-4	Martin (ESP); L 2-3	4
Pablo Cortez	Mixed individual BC2	Connolly (IRL)	W 4-1	1 Q	F Ferreira (POR); W 5-2	Murray (GBR); L 1-4	Martin (ESP); L 2-3	4
Pablo Cortez	Mixed individual BC2	Leglice (ARG)	W 8-2	1 Q	F Ferreira (POR); W 5-2	Murray (GBR); L 1-4	Martin (ESP); L 2-3	4
Roberto Leglice	Mixed individual BC2	Cortez (ARG)	L 2-8	4	did not advance			
Roberto Leglice	Mixed individual BC2	Cao (CHN)	L 2-4	4	did not advance			
Roberto Leglice	Mixed individual BC2	Connolly (IRL)	L 3-4	4	did not advance			
Pablo Cortez; Mauricio Ibarbure; Roberto Leglice; Gabriela Villano	Mixed team BC1-2	Great Britain (GBR)	L 4-6	2 Q	Portugal (POR); L 3-8	did not advance		
Pablo Cortez; Mauricio Ibarbure; Roberto Leglice; Gabriela Villano	Mixed team BC1-2	Canada (CAN)	W 6-2	2 Q	Portugal (POR); L 3-8	did not advance		

=== Cycling ===
==== Men's road ====
Athlete	Event	Time	Rank
Rodrigo López	Men's road race LC3/LC4/CP3	1:52:50	23
Rodrigo López	Men's road time trial CP3	43:56.42	8
Lujan Nattkemper; Juan Ferrari (pilot)	Men's road race B&VI 1-3	DNF	

==== Men's track ====
Athlete	Event	Qualification		Quarterfinals		Semifinals		Final	
Athlete	Event	Time	Rank	Time	Rank	Time	Rank	Opposition Time	Rank
Rodrigo López	Men's individual pursuit CP3	4:13.850	6	did not advance					
Rodrigo López	Men's time trial CP3	—N/a						1:20.57	5
Lujan Nattkemper; Juan Ferrari (pilot)	Men's sprint B&VI 1-3	12.163	8	Kappes (GBR) / Storey (GBR)	L 0-2	—N/a		7-8th place Arciniegas (COL) / Carreno (COL); L 0-2	8
Lujan Nattkemper; Juan Ferrari (pilot)	Men's time trial B&VI 1-3	—N/a						1:14.483	15

=== Football 5-a-side ===
The men's football 5-a-side team won the bronze medal after defeating Spain in the bronze medal match.

==== Players ====
- Gonzalo Abbas Hachache
- Diego Cerega
- Eduardo Diaz
- Ivan Figueroa
- Jose Luiz Jimenez
- Dario Aldo Lencina
- Antonio Mendoza
- Lucas Rodríguez
- Silvio Mauricio Velo

==== Tournament ====
7 September 2008
9:30

Argentina	2 - 0	Spain

Olympic Green Hockey Field
9 September 2008
13:00

China	1 - 0	Argentina

Olympic Green Hockey Field
11 September 2008
9:00

Argentina	0 – 0	Brazil

Olympic Green Hockey Field
Attendance: 1,150
Referee: Ilias Mastoras (Greece)
13 September 2008
13:00

South Korea	0 - 2	Argentina

Olympic Green Hockey Field
15 September 2008
9:00

Argentina	3 - 1	Great Britain

Olympic Green Hockey Field

Bronze medal match

17 September 2008
11:00

Spain	1 - 1 (aet)	Argentina

Olympic Green Hockey Field
Referee: Nelson Luis Glock (Brazil)

=== Judo ===
Athlete	Event	First Round	Quarterfinals	Semifinals	Repechage round 1	Repechage round 2	Final/ Bronze medal contest
Athlete	Event	Opposition Result	Opposition Result	Opposition Result	Opposition Result	Opposition Result	Opposition Result
Jorge Lencina	Men's 81kg	Bye	Novruzzade (AZE); W 1000-0000	Cruz (CUB); L 0001-1101	—N/a		Mirhassan Nattaj (IRI); W 0011-0001 (bronze)
Fabian Ramirez	Men's 73kg	Bye	Pourabbas (IRI); W 0010–0000	Avila (MEX); L 0000-1100	—N/a		Krieger (GER); W 1000-0000 (bronze)

=== Swimming ===
==== Men ====
Athlete	Class	Event	Heats		Final	
Athlete	Class	Event	Result	Rank	Result	Rank
Ignacio Gonzalez	S12	400m freestyle	4:42.95	7 Q	4:44.78	8
Ignacio Gonzalez	S12	100m backstroke	1:06.80	8 Q	1:06.02	6
Facundo Lazo	SB8	100m breaststroke	1:24.95	12	did not advance	
Guillermo Marro	S7	100m backstroke	1:15.73	3 Q	1:15.17	3rd place, bronze medalist(s)
Diego Pastore	S6	100m backstroke	1:26.04	7 Q	1:24.49	7
Ariel Quassi	S5	50m backstroke	49.73	12	did not advance	
Ariel Quassi	SB4	100m breaststroke	1:56.09	11	did not advance	
Ariel Quassi	SM5	200m individual medley	3:47.46	8 Q	3:50.11	7
Sebastian Ramirez	SM4	150m individual medley	3:00.45	8 Q	3:01.69	8
Juan Pablo Rosatti	S9	100m backstroke	1:12.40	10	did not advance	
Sergio Zayas	S11	400m freestyle	5:10.10	7 Q	5:08.13	7
Sergio Zayas	S11	100m backstroke	1:16.43	7 Q	1:16.06	7

==== Women ====
Athlete	Class	Event	Heats		Final	
Athlete	Class	Event	Result	Rank	Result	Rank
Nadia Baez	S11	50m freestyle	34.47	11	did not advance	
Nadia Baez	S11	100m freestyle	1:20.48	11	did not advance	
Betiana Basualdo	S2	50m backstroke	1:35.82	8 Q	1:40.14	8
Daniela Gimenez	SB9	100m breaststroke	1:27.04	6 Q	1:26.81	7
Daniela Gimenez	SM9	200m individual medley	2:55.29	13	did not advance	
Anabel Moro	SB12	100m breaststroke	1:28.35	9	did not advance	

=== Table tennis ===
Athlete	Event	Preliminaries			Quarterfinals	Semifinals	Final / BM	
Athlete	Event	Opposition Result	Opposition Result	Rank	Opposition Result	Opposition Result	Opposition Result	Rank
Daniel Rodriguez	Men's singles C4-5	Saleh (EGY); L 0–3	Thomas (FRA); L 0–3	3	did not advance			
Giselle Munoz	Women's singles C6-7	Mahmoud Afify (EGY); L 2-3	Klymenko (UKR); L 0-3	3	did not advance			

=== Wheelchair tennis ===
Athlete	Event	Round of 64	Round of 32	Round of 16	Quarterfinals	Semifinals	Finals
Athlete	Event	Opposition Result	Opposition Result	Opposition Result	Opposition Result	Opposition Result	Opposition Result
Guillermo Camusso	Men's singles	Saida (JPN); L 0-6. 0-6	did not advance				

== See also ==
- 2008 Summer Paralympics
- Argentina at the Paralympics
- Argentina at the 2008 Summer Olympics
