= Swimming at the 2008 Summer Paralympics – Men's 50 metre breaststroke SB3 =

Men's 50m Breaststroke SB3 at the XIII Paralympic Games
- Venue: Beijing National Aquatics Center
- Dates: 11 September
- Competitors: 9 from 7 nations
- Winning time: 49.06

Medalists
1st place, gold medalist(s)		Takayuki Suzuki	Japan
2nd place, silver medalist(s)		Vicente Gil	Spain
3rd place, bronze medalist(s)		Miguel Luque	Spain

The men's 50m breaststroke SB3 event at the 2008 Summer Paralympics took place at the Beijing National Aquatics Center on 11 September. There were two heats; the swimmers with the eight fastest times advanced to the final.

== Results ==
=== Heats ===
Competed from 09:32.

==== Heat 1 ====
Rank	Name	Nationality	Time	Notes
1	Miguel Luque	Spain	51.92	Q
2	Filippo Bonacini	Italy	55.75	Q
3	Vasileios Tsagkaris	Greece	56.04	Q
4	Michael Demarco	United States	1:03.26	

==== Heat 2 ====
Rank	Name	Nationality	Time	Notes
1	Takayuki Suzuki	Japan	48.49	Q, WR
2	Vicente Gil	Spain	49.46	Q
3	Konstantinos Karaouzas	Greece	56.71	Q
4	Jan Povysil	Czech Republic	58.02	Q
5	Moises Batista	Brazil	1:03.24	Q

=== Final ===
Competed at 17:19.

Rank	Name	Nationality	Time	Notes
1st place, gold medalist(s)	Takayuki Suzuki	Japan	49.06	
2nd place, silver medalist(s)	Vicente Gil	Spain	49.91	
3rd place, bronze medalist(s)	Miguel Luque	Spain	52.83	
4	Konstantinos Karaouzas	Greece	54.47	
5	Filippo Bonacini	Italy	55.76	
6	Vasileios Tsagkaris	Greece	55.91	
7	Jan Povysil	Czech Republic	57.27	
8	Moises Batista	Brazil	1:01.87	

Q = qualified for final. WR = World Record.
