= Maksym Veraksa =

Ukrainian Paralympic swimmer

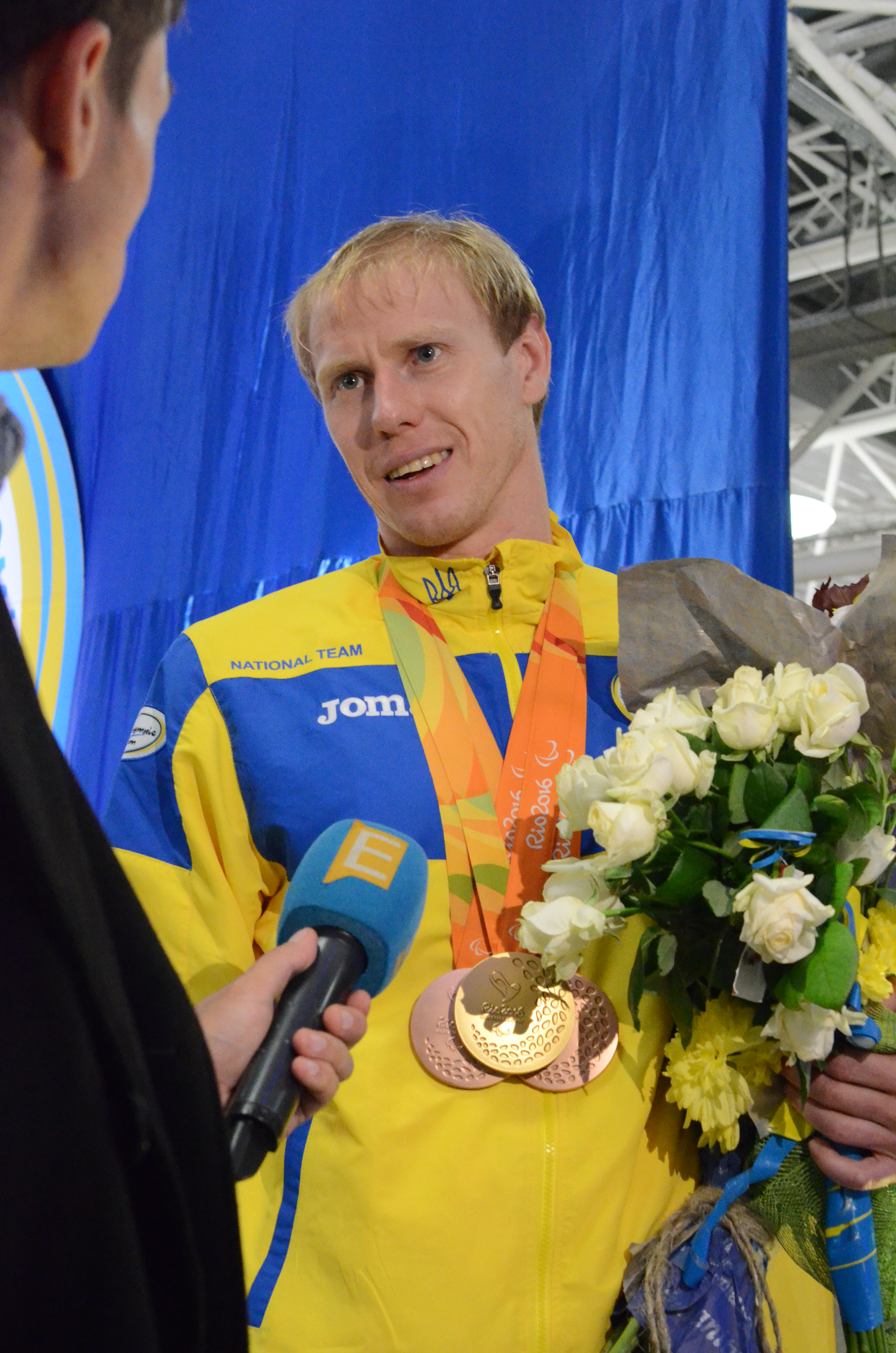

Personal information
- Born: 14 August 1984 (age 42)

Sport
- Sport: Swimming
- Club: Invasport, Kharkiv
- Coach: Vasyl Keke
Medal record
Men's para swimming
Representing Ukraine
Paralympic Games
Gold medal – first place	2008 Beijing	50 m freestyle - S12
Gold medal – first place	2008 Beijing	100 m freestyle - S12
Gold medal – first place	2008 Beijing	100 m breaststroke - SB12
Gold medal – first place	2008 Beijing	200 m individual medley - SM12
Gold medal – first place	2012 London	50 m freestyle - S12
Gold medal – first place	2012 London	100 m freestyle - S12
Gold medal – first place	2012 London	200 m individual medley - SM12
Gold medal – first place	2016 Rio de Janeiro	50 m freestyle - S12
Silver medal – second place	2020 Tokyo	100 m freestyle - S12
Silver medal – second place	2024 Paris	100 m freestyle - S12
Bronze medal – third place	2008 Beijing	100 m backstroke - S12
Bronze medal – third place	2012 London	100 m breaststroke - SB12
Bronze medal – third place	2016 Rio de Janeiro	100 m freestyle - S12
Bronze medal – third place	2016 Rio de Janeiro	100 m breaststroke - S12
Bronze medal – third place	2020 Tokyo	50 m freestyle - S13
Bronze medal – third place	2020 Tokyo	Mixed 4×100 m freestyle relay 49pts
World Championships
Gold medal – first place	2006 Durban	50 m freestyle - S12
Gold medal – first place	2006 Durban	100 m freestyle - S12
Gold medal – first place	2006 Durban	100 m backstroke - S12
Gold medal – first place	2006 Durban	4x100 m medley relay 49pts
Gold medal – first place	2010 Eindhoven	50 m freestyle - S12
Gold medal – first place	2010 Eindhoven	100 m breaststroke - SB12
Gold medal – first place	2010 Eindhoven	200 m ind. medley - SM12
Gold medal – first place	2013 Montreal	50 m freestyle - S12
Gold medal – first place	2013 Montreal	100 m freestyle - S12
Gold medal – first place	2015 Glasgow	50 m freestyle - S12
Gold medal – first place	2023 Manchester	50 m freestyle - S12
Silver medal – second place	2010 Eindhoven	100 m backstroke - S12
Silver medal – second place	2010 Eindhoven	4x100m medley relay 49pts
Silver medal – second place	2013 Montreal	100 m breaststroke - SB12
Silver medal – second place	2025 Singapore	100 m freestyle S12
Bronze medal – third place	2022 Madeira	100 m freestyle S12
Bronze medal – third place	2025 Singapore	50 m freestyle S12
European Championships
Gold medal – first place	2009 Reykjavik	100 m freestyle – S12
Gold medal – first place	2009 Reykjavik	50 m freestyle - S12
Gold medal – first place	2009 Reykjavik	200 m ind. medley – SM12
Gold medal – first place	2009 Reykjavik	100 m backstroke – S12
Gold medal – first place	2011 Berlin	50 m freestyle – S12
Gold medal – first place	2011 Berlin	100 m freestyle - S12
Gold medal – first place	2011 Berlin	100 m breaststroke - SB12
Gold medal – first place	2011 Berlin	200 m ind. medley - SM12
Gold medal – first place	2014 Eindhoven	50 m freestyle – S12
Gold medal – first place	2014 Eindhoven	100 m freestyle – S12
Gold medal – first place	2016 Funchal	50m freestyle S12
Silver medal – second place	2011 Berlin	100 m backstroke S12
Silver medal – second place	2024 Madeira	100 m freestyle S12
Silver medal – second place	2026 Kocaeli	50 m freestyle S12
Bronze medal – third place	2016 Funchal	100m freestyle S13
Bronze medal – third place	2024 Madeira	50 m freestyle S13
Bronze medal – third place	2026 Kocaeli	100 m freestyle S12

Maksym Veraksa (born 14 August 1984) is a paralympic swimmer from Ukraine competing mainly in category S12 events.

== Career ==
Maksym competed in the 2008 Summer Paralympics and 2012 Summer Paralympics as part of the Ukrainian Paralympic team. There he competed in five events winning five medals, four of them gold. In the 100m Backstroke he finished third behind Russia's Alexander Nevolin-Svetov and fellow Ukrainian Sergii Klippert who both swam quicker than the previous world record. Maksym however got revenge beating both athletes in the 50m and 100m freestyle, the 200m individual medley and beating Sergei in the 100m Breaststroke all in world record times. In the 2012 Games in London he won a further four medals, three of them gold.
