= Daniel Llambrich Gabriel =

Spanish Paralympic swimmer

Daniel Llambrich
Personal information
- Full name: Daniel Llambrich Gabriel
- Nationality: Spanish
- Born: 14 March 1975 (age 51) Barcelona, Spain

Sport
- Country: Spain
- Sport: Swimming (S12)
Medal record
Representing Spain
Men's para-swimming
Paralympic Games
Silver medal – second place	2004 Athens	4x100m medley relay 49pts
Bronze medal – third place	1992 Barcelona	400m freestyle B2
World Championships
Bronze medal – third place	1994 Malta	100m breaststroke B2
Bronze medal – third place	2006 Durban	4x100m freestyle relay 49pts
Bronze medal – third place	2006 Durban	4x100m medley relay 49pts
Men's para-aquathlon
World Championships
Gold medal – first place	2013 London	TRI 6b
Gold medal – first place	2015 Chicago	PT5
Men's para-duathlon
World Championships
Silver medal – second place	2014 Pontevedra	PT5
European Championships
Silver medal – second place	2015 Alcobendas	PT5
Bronze medal – third place	2017 Soria	PTVI

Daniel Llambrich Gabriel (born 14 March 1975 in Barcelona) is a vision impaired S12/B2 swimmer from Spain. His job in 2008 was working as a coupon seller. He competed at the 1996 Summer Paralympics and the 2000 Summer Paralympics, where he did not medal. He swam at the 2004 Summer Paralympics, winning a silver medal in the 4 x 100 meter 49 points medley relay. He raced at the 2008 Summer Paralympics.
