= Omar Font =

Spanish Paralympic swimmer (born 1990)

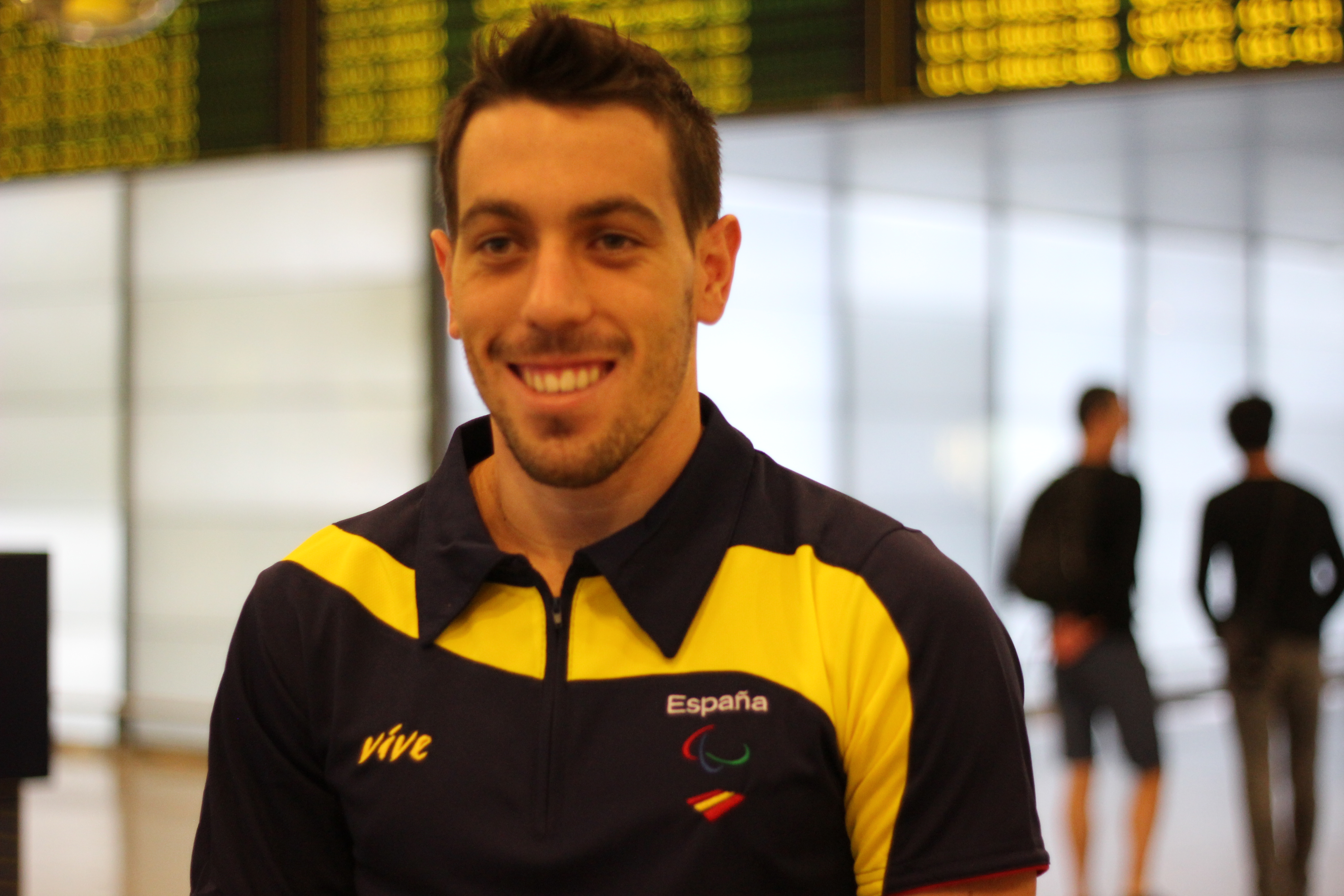

Personal information
- Nationality: Spain
- Born: 27 February 1990 (age 36) El Vendrell, Tarragona, Spain

Sport
- Sport: Swimming
Medal record
Men's swimming
Representing Spain
IPC European Championships
Bronze medal – third place	2014 Eindhoven	50 m freestyle – S12

Omar Font Jimenez (born 27 February 1990) is a Paralympic swimmer from Spain. He competed at the 2012 Summer Paralympics.

== Personal ==
Font was born on 27 February 1990 in El Vendrell, Tarragona. He is from the Catalan region of Spain, and has a vision impairment.

== Swimming ==
Font is an S12 classified swimmer. He is affiliated with the Spanish Federation of Sports for the Blind (FEDC).

At the 2006 World Swimming Championship in Durban, South Africa, Font finished sixth in the 400 meter freestyle, seventh in the 50 meter freestyle and tenth in the 200 meter freestyle. In 2007, he competed at the IDM German Open. At the 2007 World Games for the Blind and Partially Sighted in Brazil, he won a pair of silver medals in the 4x100 meter freestyle relay and 4x100 meter medley relay. He won a bronze medal at the 2009 IPC European Swimming Championships. He was one of 42 Spanish team members, of which 22 had physical disabilities, 6 had cerebral palsy, 10 were blind and four had intellectual disabilities. At the 2009 World Championships Short Course in Rio de Janeiro, Brazil, he won a bronze medal in the 50 meter freestyle and the 100 meter freestyle.

Font competed at the 2010 Adapted Swimming World Championship in the Netherlands. He finished fourth in the 100 meter freestyle. In 2012, he competed at the Paralympic Swimming Championship of Spain by Autonomous Communities. He finished first in the 100 meter butterfly event. At the 2012 Summer Paralympics, he finished sixth in the 100 meter freestyle. Prior to heading to London, he participated in a national vision impaired swim team training camp at the High Performance Centre of Sant Cugat from 6 to 23 August. Daily at the camp, there were two in water training sessions and one out of water training session. From the Catalan region of Spain, he was a recipient of a 2012 Plan ADOP scholarship. He competed at the 2013 IPC Swimming World Championships. In 2013, he was one of seven Paralympic sportspeople to get a 2013/2014 "Iberdrola Foundation Scholarship" that was awarded by the Spanish Paralympic Committee, Iberdrola Foundation, the Spanish Sports Council and the Spanish Ministry of Social Services and Equality. It provided him with €490 a month for the ten academic months of the year.
