= Thomas Rosenberger =

Austrian swimming coach and Paralympic swimmer

Personal information
- Born: 6 May 1970 (age 56)

Sport
- Sport: Paralympic swimming
- Disability: Spinal cord injury
- Disability class: S3
- Event(s): Breaststroke; Freestyle; Medley
Medal record
Paralympic swimming
Representing Austria
Paralympic Games
Silver medal – second place	2000 Location	50m breaststroke SB3
World Championships
Bronze medal – third place	2002 Mar del Plata	50m breaststroke SB3

Thomas Rosenberger (born 6 May 1970) is an Austrian swimming coach and a retired Paralympic swimmer who specialised in the breaststroke. He is a Paralympic silver medalist and a World bronze medalist. He is the coach of Paralympic swimmers Sabine Weber-Treiber, Andreas Onea and Andreas Ernhofer.
