= Elizabeth Almada =

Argentine athlete

Medal record

Paralympic athletics

Representing Argentina

Paralympic Games
Bronze medal – third place	2008 Beijing	Discus Throw - F12-13

Elizabeth Almada is a Paralympian athlete from Argentina competing mainly in category F12-13 throwing events.

She competed in the 2008 Summer Paralympics in Beijing, China. There she won a bronze medal in the women's F12-13 discus throw event. She also competed in the women's F12-13 shot put.
