= S12 (classification) =

Para-swimming classification

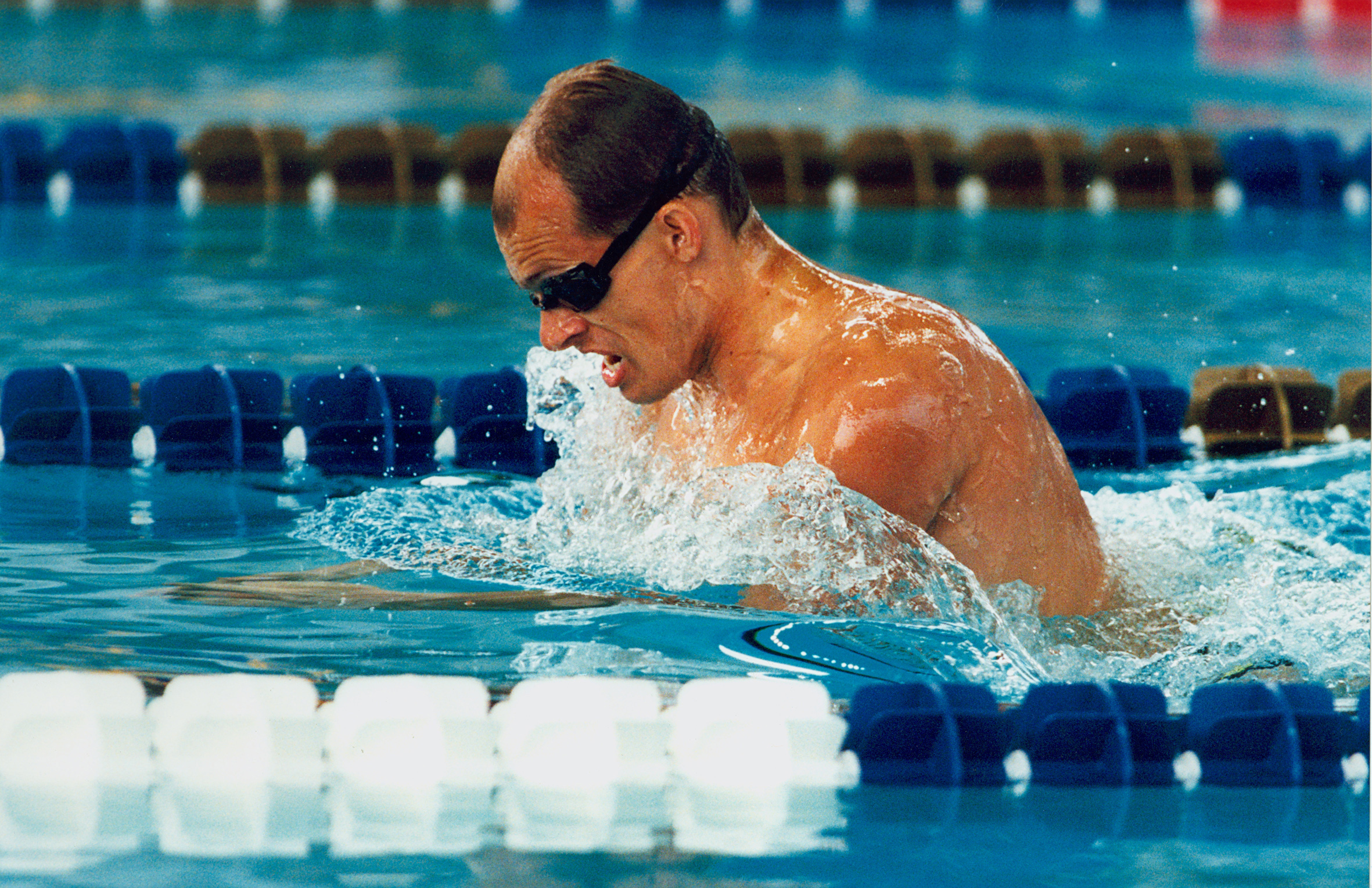
Kingsley Bugarin is an S12 classified swimmer

S12, SB12, SM12 are Para swimming classifications for swimmers with moderate visual impairment.

== History ==
The classification was created by the International Paralympic Committee. In 2003 the committee approved a plan which recommended the development of a universal classification code. The code was approved in 2007, and defines the "objective of classification as developing and implementing accurate, reliable and consistent sport focused classification systems", which are known as "evidence based, sport specific classification". In November 2015, they approved the revised classification code, which "aims to further develop evidence based, sport specific classification in all sports".

For the 2016 Summer Paralympics in Rio, the International Paralympic Committee had a zero classification at the Games policy. This policy was put into place in 2014, with the goal of avoiding last minute changes in classes that would negatively impact athlete training preparations. All competitors needed to be internationally classified with their classification status confirmed prior to the Games, with exceptions to this policy being dealt with on a case-by-case basis.

== Sport ==
This classification is for swimming. In the classification title, S represents Freestyle, Backstroke and Butterfly strokes. SB means breaststroke. SM means individual medley. Jane Buckley, writing for the Sporting Wheelies, describes the swimmers in this classification as follows: "These swimmers can recognise the shape of a hand and have some ability to see. There is a large range of vision ability within this class."

== Getting classified ==
Internationally, the classification is done by the International Blind Sports Association. In Australia, to be classified in this category, athletes contact the Australian Paralympic Committee or their state swimming governing body. In the United States, classification is handled by the United States Paralympic Committee on a national level. The classification test has three components: "a bench test, a water test, observation during competition." American swimmers are assessed by four people: a medical classifier, two general classifiers and a technical classifier.

== Competitions ==
For this classification, organisers of the Paralympic Games have the option of including the following events on the Paralympic programme: 50m, 100m and 400m Freestyle, 100m Backstroke, 100m Breaststroke, 100m Butterfly, 200m Individual Medley, and 4 × 100 m Freestyle Relay and 4 × 100 m Medley Relay.

== Competitors ==
Swimmers who have competed in this classification include Anna Efimenko, Deborah Font and Ana Garcia-Arcicollar who all won medals in their class at the 2008 Paralympics.

American swimmers who have been classified by the United States Paralympic Committee as being in this class include Katie Robinson, Alexandra Stafford and Carly Stevason.

== Records ==
In the S12 50 m Freestyle Long Course, the men's world record is held by the Ukraine's Maksym Veraksa and the women's world record is held by Brazil's Carol Santiago https://cpb.org.br/noticias/carol-santiago-bate-recorde-mundial-nos-50m-livre-e-conquista-terceiro-ouro-no-world-series-de-berlim. In the S12 100 m Freestyle Long Course, the men's world record is held by Ukraine's Maksym Veraksa and the women's world record is held by Russia's Oxana Savchenko.

== See also ==
- Para swimming classification
- Swimming at the Summer Paralympics
