= Sandra Gómez Pérez =

Spanish Paralympic swimmer

Sandra Gómez
Personal information
- Full name: Sandra Gómez Pérez
- Nationality: Spanish
- Born: 22 May 1986 (age 40) Pamplona, Navarra, Spain

Sport
- Country: Spain
- Sport: Swimming (S12)
Medal record
Swimming
Representing Spain
Paralympic Games
Gold medal – first place	2004 Athens	Women's SB12 100 meter breaststroke
Silver medal – second place	2008 Beijing	Women's SB12 100 meter breaststroke

Sandra Gómez Pérez (born 22 May 1986 in Pamplona, Navarra) is a vision impaired B2/S12 swimmer from Spain. She competed at the 2004 Summer Paralympics and 2008 Summer Paralympics, winning a gold medal at the 2004 Games in the Women's SB12 100 meter breaststroke race. She won a silver in the Women's SB12 100 meter breaststroke at the 2008 Games. In 2007, she competed at the IDM German Open. In April 2008, she was one of four Navarre women on the short list to attend the Beijing Paralympics.
