= Amaya Alonso =

Spanish Paralympic swimmer (born 1989)

Personal information
- Full name: Amaya Alonso Álvarez
- Nationality: Spanish
- Born: 12 January 1989 (age 37)

Sport
- Country: Spain
- Sport: Swimming

Amaya Alonso Álvarez (Note: In this Spanish name, the first or paternal surname is Alonso and the second or maternal family name is Álvarez.) (born 12 January 1989) is a Spanish Paralympic swimmer who has represented her counter at the 2008 and 2012 Summer Paralympics.

== Personal ==
Alonso was born in 1989 in Valladolid. She has almost no vision in her right eye, and only around 10% in her left.

== Swimming ==
Alonso is a member of C.N. Gimnasio Valladolid.

In 2005, when Alonso was 16 years old, she was a member of Club El Refugio de Huerta del Rey. At the time, she was starting to specialize in the 200 meter freestyle event. That year, she competed in the Spanish national championships, finishing high enough to qualify for a competition in Colorado Springs. At the 2007 IBSA World Games, she won a gold medal. She competed at the 2008 Summer Paralympics, finishing eighth in the 200 meter freestyle.

In 2009, Alonso competed at the Interautonómico Spring Championship for the Blind and Visually Impaired where the S12 swimmer set a world record in the 400 meters freestyle event. In doing so, she qualified for the World Championships Short Course in Brazil. She competed at the 2009 German Open. In 2011, she competed at the Spanish national adaptive swimming championships. She competed at the 2011 IPC European Championships, where she qualified for the finals in the S12 100 meter butterfly event where she qualified for the finals in eighth place. She finished fifth in the 100 meter butterfly with a time of 4:57.41. She also earned a bronze medal at the event. In June 2012, she participated in the Castilla and León Adapted Swimming Open, which served as a Paralympic qualifying event. She had previously qualified for the Games in the 400 meter freestyle, 100 meter butterfly, 100 meter freestyle, 100 meter backstroke and 200 meter individual medley. Coming out of the event, she won the 50 meter backstroke and 100 meter backstroke events. At the 2012 Summer Paralympics, she finished fifth in the 200 meter freestyle event with a time of 2:38.78. With three Spaniards making the finals, Alonso had the best finish. She was one of twelve vision impaired Spanish swimmers competing at the Games. Prior to heading to London, she participated in a national vision impaired swim team training camp at the High Performance Centre of Sant Cugat from 6 to 23 August. Daily at the camp, there were two in water training sessions and one out of water training session.
