= Yuliya Volkova (swimmer) =

Ukrainian Paralympic swimmer

Medal record

Women's swimming

Representing Ukraine

Paralympic Games
Bronze medal – third place	2004 Athens	50 m freestyle S12
Bronze medal – third place	2004 Athens	100 m breaststroke SB12
Bronze medal – third place	2004 Athens	400 m freestyle S12
Bronze medal – third place	2008 Beijing	100 m butterfly S12

IPC World Championships
Silver medal – second place	2010 Eindhoven	400 m freestyle S12
Silver medal – second place	2010 Eindhoven	100 m butterfly S12
Bronze medal – third place	2010 Eindhoven	100 m freestyle S12
Bronze medal – third place	2010 Eindhoven	100 m breaststroke SB12
Bronze medal – third place	2010 Eindhoven	200 m ind. medley SM12

IPC European Championships
Bronze medal – third place	2009 Reykjavik	400 m freestyle S13
Bronze medal – third place	2009 Reykjavik	200 m medley SM13
Bronze medal – third place	2009 Reykjavik	100 m breaststroke SM13

Yuliya Volkova is a paralympic swimmer from Ukraine competing mainly in category S12 events.

Yuliya competed as part of the Ukrainian paralympic swimming team at both the 2004 and 2008 Summer Paralympics. In her first games she won bronze medals in the 50 metres (160 ft) and 400 metres (1,300 ft) freestyle and the 100 metres (330 ft) breaststroke, she also competed in the 100m freestyle finishing fifth and the 200m individual medley where she finished seventh. In the 2008 games she won a solitary bronze in the 100m butterfly and also finished sixth in the 50m and 100m freestyle, fifth in the 200m individual medley and fourth in the 100m breaststroke.
