= Deborah Font Jiménez =

Spanish Paralympic swimmer

Deborah Font
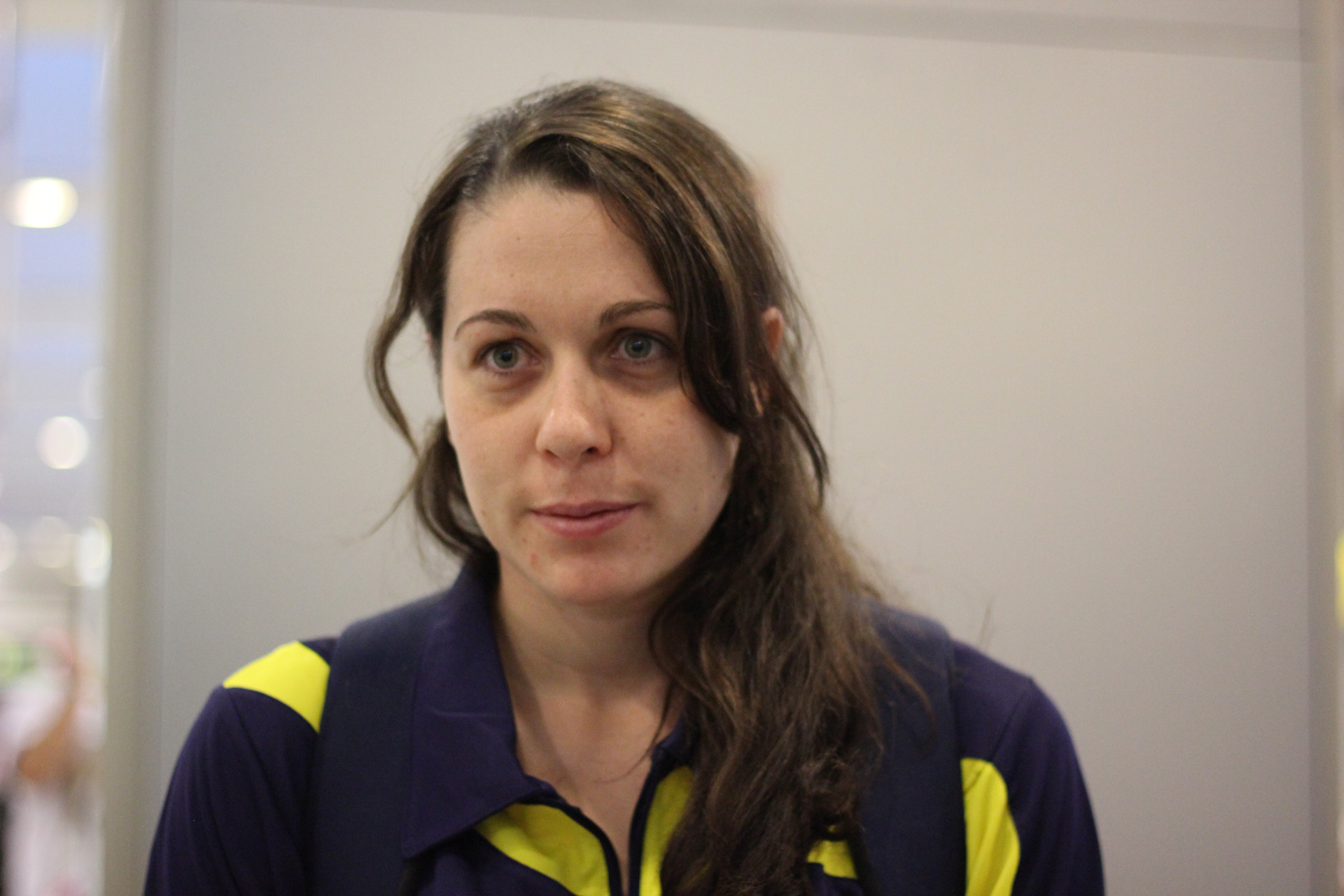

Personal information
- Full name: Deborah Font Jiménez
- Nationality: Spain
- Born: 6 September 1985 (age 41) El Vendrell, Tarragona, Spain

Sport
- Sport: Swimming
Medal record
Women's swimming
Representing Spain
Paralympic Games
| Gold medal – first place | 2000 Sydney | 100m breaststroke SB12 |
| Silver medal – second place | 2004 Athens | 100m breaststroke SB12 |
| Silver medal – second place | 2004 Athens | 400m freestyle S12 |
| Bronze medal – third place | 2000 Sydney | 400m freestyle S12 |
| Bronze medal – third place | 2004 Athens | 200m medley SM12 |
| Bronze medal – third place | 2008 Beijing | 50m freestyle S12 |
| Bronze medal – third place | 2012 London | 400m freestyle S12 |
IPC World Championships
| Gold medal – first place | 2006 Durban | 400m freestyle S12 |
| Silver medal – second place | 2002 Mar del Plata | 100m Breaststroke SB12 |
| Silver medal – second place | 2002 Mar del Plata | 200m Individual Medley SM12 |
| Silver medal – second place | 2006 Durban | 100m breaststroke SB12 |
| Silver medal – second place | 2013 Montreal | 400m freestyle S12 |
| Bronze medal – third place | 2002 Mar del Plata | 50m Freestyle S12 |
| Bronze medal – third place | 2002 Mar del Plata | 100m Freestyle S12 |
| Bronze medal – third place | 2002 Mar del Plata | 400m Freestyle S12 |
| Bronze medal – third place | 2013 Montreal | 50m freestyle S12 |
IPC European Championships
| Gold medal – first place | 2014 Eindhoven | 400m freestyle S13 |
| Silver medal – second place | 2014 Eindhoven | 100m breaststroke SB13 |

Deborah Font Jiménez (born 6 September 1985 in El Vendrell, Tarragona) is a swimmer from Spain.

== Personal ==
Font was born 6 September 1985 in El Vendrell, Tarragona. She is blind. She found a job with assistance from the Employment HPOD PROAD Program, which is supported by ONCE. In December 2013, she attended an event marking Spanish insurance company Santa Lucía Seguros becoming a sponsor of the Spanish Paralympic Committee, and consequently Plan ADOP which funds high performance Spanish disability sport competitors. She chose to attend the event because she wanted to show support for this type of sponsorship.

== Swimming ==
Font is an B2/S12 classification swimmer. When swimming, she has a "tapper" who taps her so she knows when she has to initiate a turn in the water.

Font competed at the 2000 Summer Paralympics, where she earned a gold medal in the 100 meter breaststroke race, and a pair of bronze medals in the 400 meter freestyle race and the 200 meter individual medley race. She raced at the 2004 Summer Paralympics, and earned a silver in the 100 meter breaststroke race. In 2007, she competed at the IDM German Open. She competed at the 2008 Summer Paralympics, and won a bronze in the 50 meter freestyle race. Total, she has a gold medal, two silvers and four bronze medals from the Paralympic Games.

In 2011, Font trained with Carla Casals. She competed at the 2011 IPC European Swimming Championships in Berlin, Germany where she won a bronze medal in the 100 meter breaststroke. In 2012, she competed at the Paralympic Swimming Championship of Spain by Autonomous Communities. She raced at the 2012 Summer Paralympics. She was the number three swimmer in the 400 meter freestyle race. She finished sixth in the 200 meter individual medley. She competed at the 2013 IPC Swimming World Championships. From the Catalan region of Spain, she was a recipient of a 2012 Plan ADO scholarship. In November 2013, she competed at the Spanish Age Swimming Championships for blind and visually impaired.
