= Joanna Mendak =

Polish Paralympic swimmer

Personal information
- Born: 16 February 1989 (age 37)

Sport
- Country: Poland
- Sport: Paralympic swimming
Medal record
Paralympic Games
Gold medal – first place	2004 Athens	100 m butterfly S12
Gold medal – first place	2008 Beijing	100 m butterfly S12
Gold medal – first place	2012 London	100 m butterfly S12
Silver medal – second place	2008 Beijing	200 m individual medley SM12
Bronze medal – third place	2004 Athens	100 m freestyle S12
Bronze medal – third place	2008 Beijing	100 m freestyle S12
World Championships
Bronze medal – third place	2015 Glasgow	100 m butterfly S13
Bronze medal – third place	2015 Glasgow	50 m freestyle S13
European Championships
Gold medal – first place	2009 Reykjavik	200 m individual medley SM13
Bronze medal – third place	2009 Reykjavik	50 m freestyle S12
Bronze medal – third place	2009 Reykjavik	100 m freestyle S12

Joanna Mendak (born 16 February 1989) is a Polish Paralympic swimmer. She represented Poland at the Summer Paralympics in 2004, 2008, 2012, 2016 and 2021. In total, she won three gold medals, one silver medal and two bronze medals at the Summer Paralympics.

At the 2009 European Championships she won the bronze medals in the women's 50 metre freestyle S12 and women's 100 metre freestyle S12 events. She also won the gold medal in the women's 200 metre individual medley SM13 event.

At the 2015 World Championships held in Glasgow, United Kingdom, she won the bronze medal and set a new European record in the women's 100 metre butterfly S13 event. She also won the bronze medal in the women's 50 metre freestyle S13 event.
