= Patrycja Harajda =

Polish Paralympic swimmer

Personal information
- Full name: Patrycja Ewelina Harajda
- Born: 24 February 1981 (age 45) Wrocław, Poland
- Home town: Wrocław, Poland
- Height: 169 cm (5 ft 7 in)
- Weight: 65 kg (143 lb)

Sport
- Country: Poland
- Sport: Paralympic swimming
- Disability: Disability
- Disability class: S12, SM12
- Retired: 2008
Medal record
Paralympic swimming
Representing Poland
Paralympic Games
Silver medal – second place	2004 Athens	Women's 100m backstroke S12
Silver medal – second place	2004 Athens	Women's 100m freestyle S12
Silver medal – second place	2004 Athens	Women's 200m individual medley SM12
Bronze medal – third place	2000 Sydney	Women's 100m backstroke S12
World Championships
Silver medal – second place	2006 Durban	Women's 100m backstroke S12
Bronze medal – third place	2002 Mar del Plata	Women's 100m backstroke S12
Bronze medal – third place	2006 Durban	Women's 50m freestyle S12
Bronze medal – third place	2006 Durban	Women's 100m freestyle S12
Bronze medal – third place	2006 Durban	Women's 200m individual medley SM12

Patrycja Ewelina Harajda (born 24 February 1981) is a Polish visually impaired Paralympic swimmer.
