= Ana García-Arcicollar =

Spanish Paralympic swimmer

Personal information
- Full name: Ana García-Arcicollar Vallejo
- Nationality: Spain
- Born: 28 May 1982 (age 44) Madrid, Spain

Sport
- Sport: Swimming
Medal record
Women's swimming
Representing Spain
Paralympic Games
Bronze medal – third place	1996 Atlanta	100 m backstroke B2
Bronze medal – third place	1996 Atlanta	200 m breaststroke B2
Bronze medal – third place	1996 Atlanta	4x100 m medley B1-3
Silver medal – second place	2000 Sydney	400 m freestyle S12
Bronze medal – third place	2000 Sydney	100 m butterfly S12
Gold medal – first place	2004 Athens	400 m freestyle S12
Bronze medal – third place	2004 Athens	100 m butterfly S12
Silver medal – second place	2008 Beijing	100 m butterfly S12
World Championships
Silver medal – second place	2002 Mar del Plata	100 m backstroke S12
Silver medal – second place	2006 Durban	400 m freestyle S12
Bronze medal – third place	2006 Durban	100 m backstroke S12
Bronze medal – third place	2006 Durban	100 m Butterfly S12
Bronze medal – third place	2006 Durban	5,000 m open water

Ana Garcia-Arcicollar Vallejo (Note: In this Spanish name, the first or paternal surname is Garcia-Arcicollar and the second or maternal family name is Vallejo.) (born 28 May 1982) is a Spanish teacher and a vision impaired B2/S12 swimmer. She has a vision impairment because of a congenital disease. She competed at the 1996 Summer Paralympics, winning a bronze in the 4 X 100 meter medley 49 points S11 - S13 race, the 200 meter breaststroke race and the 100 meter backstroke race. She competed at the 2000 Summer Paralympics in Sydney, Australia, winning a silver in the 400 meter freestyle race, and a bronze in the 100 meter butterfly race. She competed at the 2004 Summer Paralympics, winning a gold in the 400 meter freestyle race, and a bronze in the 100 meter butterfly race. She competed at the 2008 Summer Paralympics, winning a silver in the 100 meter butterfly race. She also raced at the IBSA World Games in São Paulo, Brazil. She raced at the 2006 World Swimming Championship in Durban, South Africa and the II IBSA World Blind Championships in 2003 in Quebec, Canada. She set world records in the 2003 races in the 4 X 50 meter Freestyle S11 - S13 race, the 800 meter freestyle S12 race and the 4 X 50 meter medley S11 - S13 race.
