= Carla Casals =

Spanish Paralympic swimmer

Personal information
- Full name: Carla Casals Solé
- Nationality: Spain
- Born: 6 February 1987 (age 39) Barcelona, Spain
- Height: 1.62 m (5 ft 4 in)

Sport
- Sport: Swimming
Medal record
Women's para swimming
Representing Spain
IPC World Championships
Silver medal – second place	2013 Montreal	200m medley SM12
Bronze medal – third place	2002 Mar del Plata	100m breaststroke SB12
Bronze medal – third place	2010 Eindhoven	100m butterfly S12
Bronze medal – third place	2013 Montreal	100m butterfly S12
IPC World Championships 25m
Silver medal – second place	2009 Rio de Janeiro	200m breaststroke SB12
Bronze medal – third place	2009 Rio de Janeiro	100m medley SM12
IPC European Championships
Gold medal – first place	2009 Reikjavik	100 breaststroke
Bronze medal – third place	2009 Reikjavik	100 butterfly
Bronze medal – third place	2014 Eindhoven	100m breaststroke SB12

Carla Casals Solé (Note: In this Spanish name, the first or paternal surname is Casals and the second or maternal family name is Solé.) (born 6 February 1987) is a Paralympic swimmer from Spain.

== Personal ==
Casals is from the Catalan region of Spain. Living at the High Performance Centre (CAR) of San Cugat del Vallés in 2013, she shared a room with an Olympic athlete.

== Swimming ==
Casals is an S12 classified swimmer. She is affiliated with the Spanish Federation of Sports for the Blind (FEDC).

In 2007, Casals competed at the IDM German Open. Casals won a gold medal at the 2009 IPC European Swimming Championships. She was one of 42 Spanish team members, of which 22 had physical disabilities, 6 had cerebral palsy, 10 were blind and four had intellectual disabilities. Casals competed at the 2010 Adapted Swimming World Championship in the Netherlands, where she won a gold medal. She finished seventh in the 100 meter backstroke.

In 2011, Casals trained with Deborah Font Jimenez. She competed at the 2011 IPC European Swimming Championships in Berlin, Germany, finishing fifth in the 200 meter freestyle and fourth in the 100 meter breaststroke. In 2012, Casals competed at the Paralympic Swimming Championship of Spain by Autonomous Communities. She finished first in the 100 meter butterfly event and second in the SB23 100 meter breaststroke event. She competed at the 2012 Summer Paralympics, where she finished eighth in the 200 meter individual medley, fourth in the 100 meter butterfly, and sixth in the 100 meter breastroke. Prior to heading to London, she participated in a national vision impaired swim team training camp at the High Performance Centre of Sant Cugat from 6 to 23 August. Daily at the camp, there were two in water training sessions and one out of water training session. Casals competed at the 2013 Swimming Championship of Catalonia, hosted by the Sabadell Swimming Club, where she was one of nine Spanish swimmers to set a qualifying time for the World Championships. She competed at the 2013 IPC Swimming World Championships. From the Catalan region of Spain, she was a recipient a 2012 Plan ADO scholarship.
