= Hong Kong at the 2008 Summer Paralympics =

- IPC code: HKG
- NPC: Hong Kong Paralympic Committee & Sports Association for the Physically Disabled
- Website: www.hkparalympic.org

in Beijing
- Competitors: 21 in 8 sports
- Flag bearer: So Wa Wai
- Medals Ranked 26th: Gold 5 Silver 3 Bronze 3 Total 11

Summer Paralympics appearances (overview)
- 1972; 1976; 1980; 1984; 1988; 1992; 1996; 2000; 2004; 2008; 2012; 2016; 2020; 2024

Hong Kong competed under the name "Hong Kong, China" at the 2008 Summer Paralympics in Beijing, People's Republic of China. Hong Kong sent 21 athletes to compete in eight events at the Beijing Games. Although Hong Kong's NPC was a separate member of the IPC, Hong Kong hosted the equestrian events.

== Medalists ==
Medal	Name	Sport	Event	Date
Gold	Kwok Hoi Ying Karen	Boccia	Women's Mixed Individual - BC2	7th
Gold	Chan Yui Chong	Wheelchair fencing	Women's Individual Foil - Category B Women's Individual Épée - Category B	14th 16th
Gold	So Wa Wai	Athletics	Men's 200m - T36 Final	15th
Gold	Yu Chui Yee	Wheelchair fencing	Women's Individual Foil - Category A	16th
Silver	Leung Yuk Wing	Boccia	Men's Mixed Individual - BC4	9th
Silver	Yu Chui Yee	Wheelchair fencing	Women's Individual Épée - Category A	15th
Silver	Hui Charn Hung	Wheelchair fencing	Men's Individual Sabre - Category B	17th
Bronze	So Wa Wai	Athletics	Men's 100m - T36 Final	9th
Bronze	Fan Pui Shan	Wheelchair fencing	Women's Individual Épée - Category A Women's Individual Foil - Category A	15th 16th

== Sports ==
=== Athletics ===
==== Men ====
Athlete	Events	Heat		Semifinal		Final	
Athlete	Events	Time	Rank	Time	Rank	Time	Rank
So Wa Wai	100 m T36	N/A				12.38 SB	Bronze medal
So Wa Wai	200 m T36	N/A				24.65 WR	Gold medal
So Wa Wai	400 m T36	N/A				58.44 SB	6th

==== Women ====
Athlete	Events	Heat		Semifinal		Final	
Athlete	Events	Time	Rank	Time	Rank	Time	Rank
Yu Chun Lai	100 m T36	N/A				15.66 SB	5th
Yu Chun Lai	200 m T36	N/A				33.55 SB	6th

=== Boccia ===
Athlete	Event	Match 1	Match 2	Match 3	Match 4	Quarterfinals	Semifinals	Final	
Athlete	Event	Opposition Result	Opposition Result	Opposition Result	Opposition Result	Opposition Result	Opposition Result	Opposition Result	Rank
Lau Wai Yan Vivian	Mixed ind. BC4	Dueso (ESP); L 5-6	Beres (HUN); W 3-2	Kratina (CZE); W 6-2	N/A	Santos (BRA); L 3-7	did not advance		
Leung Yuk Wing	Mixed ind. BC4	Ni Suili (CHN); L 2-3	Streharsky (SVK); W 4-3	Durkovic (SVK); W 7-4	N/A	Pereira (POR); W 9-2	Dueso (ESP); W 6-1	Pinto (BRA); L 1-3	Silver medal
Leung Mei Yee	Mixed ind. BC1	Vaquerizo (ESP); L 0-5	Fernandes (POR); L 2-5	Zhang Qi (CHN); L 1-10	Sarela (FIN); W 3-2	did not advance			
John Loung	Mixed ind. BC2	Hirose (JPN); L 3-4	Bonner (NZL); W 4-1	Murray (GBR); L 1-9	N/A	did not advance			
Kwok Hoi Ying Karen	Mixed ind. BC2	Wilhelmsen (NOR); W 15-0	Morriss (NZL); W 3-2	Toon (NZL); W 4-3	N/A	Goncalves (POR); W 8-1	Martin (ESP); W 4-3	Murray (GBR); W 5-3	Gold medal
Wong Wing Hong	Mixed ind. BC2	Norsterud (NOR); L 1-6	Martin (ESP); L 1-8	Goncalves (POR); L 0-11	N/A	did not advance			
Kwok Hoi Ying Karen, Lau Wai Yan Vivian	Mixed Pairs BC4	Czech Republic (CZE); L 2-4	China (CHN); W 8-4	Portugal (POR); W 3-2	N/A	did not advance			
Leung Yuk Wing, Leung Mei Yee, John Loung, Wong Wing Hong	Mixed team BC1-2	China (CHN); L 3-7	New Zealand (NZL); W 8-2	N/A	N/A	Spain (ESP); L 4-8	did not advance		5th

=== Equestrian ===
Athlete	Horse	Event	Total	
Athlete	Horse	Event	Score	Rank
Yip Siu Hong	Icy Bet	Mixed individual championship test grade II	50.545	18
Yip Siu Hong	Icy Bet	Mixed individual freestyle test grade II	58.166	15

=== Powerlifting ===
Athlete	Event	Result	Rank
Lam Yim Hung	Women's -40 kg	62.5 kg	8

=== Rowing ===
Athlete	Event	Heats		Repechage		Final	
Athlete	Event	Time	Rank	Time	Rank	Time	Rank
Cho Ping	Women's single sculls	6:38.46	11 R	7:34.64	9 FB	7:41.06	4

=== Shooting ===
Athlete	Event	Qualification		Final	
Athlete	Event	Score	Rank	Score	Rank
Leung Yuk Chun	Women's R2 10 m air pistol SH1A	344	15	did not advance	

=== Table tennis ===
==== Men ====
Athlete	Event	Preliminaries			Round of 16	Quarterfinals	Semifinals	Final / BM	
Athlete	Event	Opposition Result	Opposition Result	Rank	Opposition Result	Opposition Result	Opposition Result	Opposition Result	Rank
Kwong Kam Shing	Men's individual C4-5	Martin (FRA); L 1–3	Oka (JPN); L 0–3	3	did not advance				
Tsang Tit Hung	Men's individual C4-5	Jung E C (KOR); L 0-3	Caci (ITA); W 3-2	2	did not advance				
Kwong Kam Shing; Tsang Tit Hung	Men's team C4-5	—			Germany (GER); L 2-3	did not advance			

==== Women ====
Athlete	Event	Preliminaries				Round of 16	Quarterfinals	Semifinals	Final / BM	
Athlete	Event	Opposition Result	Opposition Result	Opposition Result	Rank	Opposition Result	Opposition Result	Opposition Result	Opposition Result	Rank
Chan Siu Ling	Women's singles C5	Zimmerer (GER); L 0–3	Zhang B (CHN); L 0–3	Barszcz (POL); W 3–0	3	did not advance				
Wong Pui Yi	Women's singles C5	Gu G (CHN); L 2-3	Wei M H (TPE); L 0-3	Paredes (MEX); L 2-3	4	did not advance				
Chang Siu Ling; Wong Pui Yi	Women's team C4-5	—				Slovenia (SLO); L 1-3	did not advance			

=== Wheelchair fencing ===
==== Men ====
Athlete	Event	Qualification			Round of 16	Quarterfinal	Semifinal	Final / BM	
Athlete	Event	Opposition	Score	Rank	Opposition Score	Opposition Score	Opposition Score	Opposition Score	Rank
Chan Wing Kin	Men's foil A	Ye R (CHN)	L 2-5	2 Q	Mato (HUN); W 15-11	Betti (ITA); W 15-14	Zhang L (CHN); L 5-15	Pender (POL); L 9-15	4
Chan Wing Kin	Men's foil A	Bazhukov (UKR)	W 5-3	2 Q	Mato (HUN); W 15-11	Betti (ITA); W 15-14	Zhang L (CHN); L 5-15	Pender (POL); L 9-15	4
Chan Wing Kin	Men's foil A	Makowski (POL)	W 5-1	2 Q	Mato (HUN); W 15-11	Betti (ITA); W 15-14	Zhang L (CHN); L 5-15	Pender (POL); L 9-15	4
Chan Wing Kin	Men's foil A	Frolov (RUS)	W 5-2	2 Q	Mato (HUN); W 15-11	Betti (ITA); W 15-14	Zhang L (CHN); L 5-15	Pender (POL); L 9-15	4
Chan Wing Kin	Men's foil A	Calhoun (USA)	W 5-0	2 Q	Mato (HUN); W 15-11	Betti (ITA); W 15-14	Zhang L (CHN); L 5-15	Pender (POL); L 9-15	4
Chan Wing Kin	Men's sabre A	Tian (CHN)	L 3-5	2 Q	Citerne (FRA); W 15-13	Davydenko (UKR); W 15-10	Ye R (CHN); L 11-15	Pellegrini (ITA); L 5-15	4
Chan Wing Kin	Men's sabre A	Pylarinos Markantonatos (GRE)	W 5-2	2 Q	Citerne (FRA); W 15-13	Davydenko (UKR); W 15-10	Ye R (CHN); L 11-15	Pellegrini (ITA); L 5-15	4
Chan Wing Kin	Men's sabre A	Davydenko (UKR)	W 5-0	2 Q	Citerne (FRA); W 15-13	Davydenko (UKR); W 15-10	Ye R (CHN); L 11-15	Pellegrini (ITA); L 5-15	4
Chan Wing Kin	Men's sabre A	Serafini (ITA)	W 5-3	2 Q	Citerne (FRA); W 15-13	Davydenko (UKR); W 15-10	Ye R (CHN); L 11-15	Pellegrini (ITA); L 5-15	4
Chan Wing Kin	Men's sabre A	Redondo (ESP)	W 5-2	2 Q	Citerne (FRA); W 15-13	Davydenko (UKR); W 15-10	Ye R (CHN); L 11-15	Pellegrini (ITA); L 5-15	4
Hui Charn Hung	Men's foil B	Hu D (CHN)	L 1-5	2 Q	Alsaedi (KUW); W 15-3	Szekeres (HUN); L 11-15	did not advance		
Hui Charn Hung	Men's foil B	Szekeres (HUN)	W 5-3	2 Q	Alsaedi (KUW); W 15-3	Szekeres (HUN); L 11-15	did not advance		
Hui Charn Hung	Men's foil B	Komar (UKR)	W 5-2	2 Q	Alsaedi (KUW); W 15-3	Szekeres (HUN); L 11-15	did not advance		
Hui Charn Hung	Men's foil B	Moreno (USA)	W 5-1	2 Q	Alsaedi (KUW); W 15-3	Szekeres (HUN); L 11-15	did not advance		
Hui Charn Hung	Men's foil B	Kim G H (KOR)	W 5-0	2 Q	Alsaedi (KUW); W 15-3	Szekeres (HUN); L 11-15	did not advance		
Hui Charn Hung	Men's sabre B	Mari (ITA)	L 4-5	2 Q	Szekeres (HUN); W 15-12	Soler (ESP); W 15-10	Cratere (FRA); W 15-14	Francois (FRA); L 9-15	2nd place, silver medalist(s)
Hui Charn Hung	Men's sabre B	Pluta (POL)	W 5-1	2 Q	Szekeres (HUN); W 15-12	Soler (ESP); W 15-10	Cratere (FRA); W 15-14	Francois (FRA); L 9-15	2nd place, silver medalist(s)
Hui Charn Hung	Men's sabre B	Yusupov (RUS)	W 5-4	2 Q	Szekeres (HUN); W 15-12	Soler (ESP); W 15-10	Cratere (FRA); W 15-14	Francois (FRA); L 9-15	2nd place, silver medalist(s)
Hui Charn Hung	Men's sabre B	Soler (ESP)	L 2-5	2 Q	Szekeres (HUN); W 15-12	Soler (ESP); W 15-10	Cratere (FRA); W 15-14	Francois (FRA); L 9-15	2nd place, silver medalist(s)
Hui Charn Hung	Men's sabre B	Moreno (USA)	W 5-1	2 Q	Szekeres (HUN); W 15-12	Soler (ESP); W 15-10	Cratere (FRA); W 15-14	Francois (FRA); L 9-15	2nd place, silver medalist(s)
Wong Tang Tat	Men's épée A	Tian (CHN)	L 2-5	2 Q	Stanczuk (POL); L 11-15	did not advance			
Wong Tang Tat	Men's épée A	Betti (ITA)	W 5-4	2 Q	Stanczuk (POL); L 11-15	did not advance			
Wong Tang Tat	Men's épée A	Stanczuk (POL)	W 5-4	2 Q	Stanczuk (POL); L 11-15	did not advance			
Wong Tang Tat	Men's épée A	Alqallaf (KUW)	W 5-3	2 Q	Stanczuk (POL); L 11-15	did not advance			
Wong Tang Tat	Men's épée A	Horvath (HUN)	W 5-4	2 Q	Stanczuk (POL); L 11-15	did not advance			

==== Women ====
Athlete	Event	Qualification			Quarterfinal	Semifinal	Final / BM	
Athlete	Event	Opposition	Score	Rank	Opposition Score	Opposition Score	Opposition Score	Rank
Chan Yui Chong	Women's épée B	Jana (THA)	L 1-5	2 Q	Ye H (CHN); W 15-10	Jana (THA); W 15-8	Yao F (CHN); W 15-12	1st place, gold medalist(s)
Chan Yui Chong	Women's épée B	Ye H (CHN)	W 5-1	2 Q	Ye H (CHN); W 15-10	Jana (THA); W 15-8	Yao F (CHN); W 15-12	1st place, gold medalist(s)
Chan Yui Chong	Women's épée B	Dani (HUN)	W 5-4	2 Q	Ye H (CHN); W 15-10	Jana (THA); W 15-8	Yao F (CHN); W 15-12	1st place, gold medalist(s)
Chan Yui Chong	Women's épée B	Lukianenko (UKR)	W 5-3	2 Q	Ye H (CHN); W 15-10	Jana (THA); W 15-8	Yao F (CHN); W 15-12	1st place, gold medalist(s)
Chan Yui Chong	Women's épée B	Hassen Bey (ESP)	W 5-0	2 Q	Ye H (CHN); W 15-10	Jana (THA); W 15-8	Yao F (CHN); W 15-12	1st place, gold medalist(s)
Chan Yui Chong	Women's foil B	Ye H (CHN)	W 5-3	1 Q	Palfi (HUN); W 15-4	Ye H (CHN); W 15-5	Yao F (CHN); W 15-8	1st place, gold medalist(s)
Chan Yui Chong	Women's foil B	Jana (THA)	W 5-2	1 Q	Palfi (HUN); W 15-4	Ye H (CHN); W 15-5	Yao F (CHN); W 15-8	1st place, gold medalist(s)
Chan Yui Chong	Women's foil B	Palfi (HUN)	W 5-3	1 Q	Palfi (HUN); W 15-4	Ye H (CHN); W 15-5	Yao F (CHN); W 15-8	1st place, gold medalist(s)
Chan Yui Chong	Women's foil B	Vasilyeva (RUS)	W 5-1	1 Q	Palfi (HUN); W 15-4	Ye H (CHN); W 15-5	Yao F (CHN); W 15-8	1st place, gold medalist(s)
Chan Yui Chong	Women's foil B	Demello (USA)	W 5-0	1 Q	Palfi (HUN); W 15-4	Ye H (CHN); W 15-5	Yao F (CHN); W 15-8	1st place, gold medalist(s)
Fan Pui Shan	Women's épée A	Zhang C (CHN)	L 4–5	4 Q	Juhasz (HUN); W 15–12	Yu C Y (HKG); L 10-15	Krajnyak (HUN); W 15-14	3rd place, bronze medalist(s)
Fan Pui Shan	Women's épée A	Gorlina (UKR)	W 5-4	4 Q	Juhasz (HUN); W 15–12	Yu C Y (HKG); L 10-15	Krajnyak (HUN); W 15-14	3rd place, bronze medalist(s)
Fan Pui Shan	Women's épée A	Krajnyak (HUN)	L 4-5	4 Q	Juhasz (HUN); W 15–12	Yu C Y (HKG); L 10-15	Krajnyak (HUN); W 15-14	3rd place, bronze medalist(s)
Fan Pui Shan	Women's épée A	Trigilia (ITA)	W 5-3	4 Q	Juhasz (HUN); W 15–12	Yu C Y (HKG); L 10-15	Krajnyak (HUN); W 15-14	3rd place, bronze medalist(s)
Fan Pui Shan	Women's épée A	Picot (FRA)	W 5-3	4 Q	Juhasz (HUN); W 15–12	Yu C Y (HKG); L 10-15	Krajnyak (HUN); W 15-14	3rd place, bronze medalist(s)
Fan Pui Shan	Women's foil A	Poignet (FRA)	L 1-5	2 Q	Trigilia (ITA); W 15-13	Zhang C (CHN); L 1-15	Poignet (FRA); W 15-12	3rd place, bronze medalist(s)
Fan Pui Shan	Women's foil A	Krajnyak (HUN)	L 1-5	2 Q	Trigilia (ITA); W 15-13	Zhang C (CHN); L 1-15	Poignet (FRA); W 15-12	3rd place, bronze medalist(s)
Fan Pui Shan	Women's foil A	Zhang W (CHN)	W 5-3	2 Q	Trigilia (ITA); W 15-13	Zhang C (CHN); L 1-15	Poignet (FRA); W 15-12	3rd place, bronze medalist(s)
Fan Pui Shan	Women's foil A	Gorlina (UKR)	W 5-1	2 Q	Trigilia (ITA); W 15-13	Zhang C (CHN); L 1-15	Poignet (FRA); W 15-12	3rd place, bronze medalist(s)
Fan Pui Shan	Women's foil A	Witos-Eze (POL)	W 5-3	2 Q	Trigilia (ITA); W 15-13	Zhang C (CHN); L 1-15	Poignet (FRA); W 15-12	3rd place, bronze medalist(s)
Yu Chui Yee	Women's épée A	Juhasz (HUN)	W 5-3	1 Q	Witos-Eze (POL); W 15-6	Fan P S (HKG); W 15-10	Zhang C (CHN); L 13-15	2nd place, silver medalist(s)
Yu Chui Yee	Women's épée A	Witos-Eze (POL)	W 5-3	1 Q	Witos-Eze (POL); W 15-6	Fan P S (HKG); W 15-10	Zhang C (CHN); L 13-15	2nd place, silver medalist(s)
Yu Chui Yee	Women's épée A	Halkina (BLR)	W 5-3	1 Q	Witos-Eze (POL); W 15-6	Fan P S (HKG); W 15-10	Zhang C (CHN); L 13-15	2nd place, silver medalist(s)
Yu Chui Yee	Women's épée A	Zhang W (CHN)	W 5-3	1 Q	Witos-Eze (POL); W 15-6	Fan P S (HKG); W 15-10	Zhang C (CHN); L 13-15	2nd place, silver medalist(s)
Yu Chui Yee	Women's épée A	Poignet (FRA)	W 5-4	1 Q	Witos-Eze (POL); W 15-6	Fan P S (HKG); W 15-10	Zhang C (CHN); L 13-15	2nd place, silver medalist(s)
Yu Chui Yee	Women's foil A	Zhang C (CHN)	L 3-5	2 Q	Krajnyak (HUN); W 15-1	Poignet (FRA); W 15-6	Zhang C (CHN); W 15-13	1st place, gold medalist(s)
Yu Chui Yee	Women's foil A	Trigilia (ITA)	W 5-2	2 Q	Krajnyak (HUN); W 15-1	Poignet (FRA); W 15-6	Zhang C (CHN); W 15-13	1st place, gold medalist(s)
Yu Chui Yee	Women's foil A	Picot (FRA)	W 5-3	2 Q	Krajnyak (HUN); W 15-1	Poignet (FRA); W 15-6	Zhang C (CHN); W 15-13	1st place, gold medalist(s)
Yu Chui Yee	Women's foil A	Halkina (BLR)	W 5-3	2 Q	Krajnyak (HUN); W 15-1	Poignet (FRA); W 15-6	Zhang C (CHN); W 15-13	1st place, gold medalist(s)
Yu Chui Yee	Women's foil A	Juhasz (HUN)	W 5-0	2 Q	Krajnyak (HUN); W 15-1	Poignet (FRA); W 15-6	Zhang C (CHN); W 15-13	1st place, gold medalist(s)

== See also ==
- 2008 Summer Paralympics
- Hong Kong at the Paralympics
- Hong Kong, China at the 2008 Summer Olympics
