= Hungary at the 2008 Summer Paralympics =

- IPC code: HUN
- NPC: Hungarian Paralympic Committee
- Website: www.hparalimpia.hu

in Beijing
- Competitors: 16 in 6 sports
- Medals Ranked 49th: Gold 1 Silver 0 Bronze 5 Total 6

Summer Paralympics appearances (overview)
- 1972; 1976; 1980; 1984; 1988; 1992; 1996; 2000; 2004; 2008; 2012; 2016; 2020; 2024

Hungary competed at the 2008 Summer Paralympics in Beijing.

== Medalists ==
Medal	Name	Sport	Event
Gold	Tamás Sors	Swimming	Men's 100m butterfly S9
Bronze	Tamás Sors	Swimming	Men's 400m freestyle S9
Bronze	Tamás Sors	Swimming	Men's 100m freestyle S9
Bronze	Gitta Raczko	Swimming	Women's 100m breaststroke SB5
Bronze	Zsolt Vereczkei	Swimming	Men's 50m backstroke S5
Bronze	Pál Szekeres	Wheelchair Fencing	Men's Individual Foil B

== Sports ==
=== Boccia ===
Athlete	Event	Preliminaries			Quarterfinals	Semifinals	Final	
Athlete	Event	Opponent	Opposition Score	Rank	Opposition Score	Opposition Score	Opposition Score	Rank
Dezso Beres	Mixed individual BC4	Lau W Y V (HKG)	L 2-3	3	did not advance			
Dezso Beres	Mixed individual BC4	Dueso (ESP)	L 6-7	3	did not advance			
Dezso Beres	Mixed individual BC4	Kratina (CZE)	W 9-1	3	did not advance			
Jozsef Gyurkota	Mixed individual BC4	F Pereira (POR)	L 0-5	4	did not advance			
Jozsef Gyurkota	Mixed individual BC4	Pinto (BRA)	L 1-4	4	did not advance			
Jozsef Gyurkota	Mixed individual BC4	Valentim (POR)	L 2-7	4	did not advance			
Dezso Beres; Jozsef Gyurkota	Pairs BC4	Dueso (ESP) / Desamparados Baixauli (ESP)	L 4-6	4	did not advance			
Dezso Beres; Jozsef Gyurkota	Pairs BC4	Pinto (BRA) / E Santos (BRA)	L 2-6	4	did not advance			
Dezso Beres; Jozsef Gyurkota	Pairs BC4	Durkovic (SVK) / Streharsky (SVK)	L 4-5	4	did not advance			

=== Judo ===
==== Men ====
Athlete	Event	First Round	Quarterfinals	Semifinals	Repechage round 1	Repechage round 2	Final/ Bronze medal contest
Athlete	Event	Opposition Result	Opposition Result	Opposition Result	Opposition Result	Opposition Result	Opposition Result
Gabor Papp	Men's +100kg	Parasyuk (RUS); W 1011–0000	Papachristos (GRE); W 1001-0001	Wang S (CHN); L 0111-1110	—N/a		Taurines (FRA); L 0000-1000
Gabor Vincze	Men's 81kg	Bye	Jonard (FRA); L 0001-1100	—N/a	Mirhassan Nattaj (IRI); L 0000-0002	did not advance	

==== Women ====
Athlete	Event	First Round	Quarterfinals	Semifinals	Repechage	Final/ Bronze medal contest
Athlete	Event	Opposition Result	Opposition Result	Opposition Result	Opposition Result	Opposition Result
Nikolett Szabo	Women's 70kg	Vermeulen (NED); L 0001–0011	—N/a		Mouton (USA); W 1000-0000	Savostyanova (RUS); L 0000-1000

=== Powerlifting ===
Athlete	Event	Result	Rank
Sandor Sas	100kg	195.0	7
Csaba Szavai	+100kg	NMR	

=== Sailing ===
One Hungarian athlete competed in the following event in sailing:

- Single-Person Keelboat - 2.4mR

=== Shooting ===
Athlete	Event	Qualification		Final		
Athlete	Event	Score	Rank	Score	Total	Rank
Gyula Gurisatti	Men's 10m air pistol SH1	551	25	did not advance		
Gyula Gurisatti	Mixed 25m pistol SH1	551	19	did not advance		
Gyula Gurisatti	Mixed 50m pistol SH1	510	21	did not advance		

=== Swimming ===
==== Men ====
Athlete	Class	Event	Heats		Final	
Athlete	Class	Event	Result	Rank	Result	Rank
Janos Becsey	S7	50m freestyle	31.99	8 Q	31.46	7
Janos Becsey	S7	100m freestyle	1:09.78	8 Q	1:09.20	8
Janos Becsey	SB7	100m breaststroke	1:41.40	12	did not advance	
Janos Becsey	SM7	200m individual medley	2:58.31	8 Q	DSQ	
Zoltan Bencsura	S6	50m butterfly	36.95	9	did not advance	
Ferenc Csuri	S8	50m freestyle	29.13	10	did not advance	
Ferenc Csuri	S8	100m freestyle	1:03.55	11	did not advance	
Ferenc Csuri	S8	100m butterfly	1:07.96	8 Q	1:08.17	7
Ferenc Csuri	SM8	200m individual medley	2:40.46	10	did not advance	
Ervin Kovacs	S5	50m backstroke	39.82	3 Q	40.61	4
Ervin Kovacs	S5	50m butterfly	39.97	4 Q	39.33	4
Ervin Kovacs	SB4	100m breaststroke	1:45.01	4 Q	1:44.12	4
Ervin Kovacs	SM5	200m individual medley	3:14.70	4 Q	3:12.02	4
Tamás Sors	S9	50m freestyle	26.73	7 Q	26.21	5
Tamás Sors	S9	100m freestyle	57.59	4 Q	56.80	3rd place, bronze medalist(s)
Tamás Sors	S9	400m freestyle	4:26.21	4 Q	4:20.26	3rd place, bronze medalist(s)
Tamás Sors	S9	100m butterfly	59.38	1 Q	59.34	1st place, gold medalist(s)
Tamás Sors	SM9	200m individual medley	2:22.98	3 Q	2:21.42	4
Zsolt Vereczkei	S5	50m backstroke	40.50	4 Q	38.78	3rd place, bronze medalist(s)
Zsolt Vereczkei	S5	50m freestyle	40.82	11	did not advance	

==== Women ====
Athlete	Class	Event	Heats		Final	
Athlete	Class	Event	Result	Rank	Result	Rank
Dorottya Baka	S7	100m backstroke	1:40.14	9	did not advance	
Katalin Engelhardt	S5	50m freestyle	44.89	7 Q	45.78	8
Katalin Engelhardt	S5	100m freestyle	1:42.71	9	did not advance	
Katalin Engelhardt	S5	200m freestyle	3:32.37	9	did not advance	
Katalin Engelhardt	SB4	100m breaststroke	2:10.62	7 Q	2:09.72	7
Fanni Illes	S6	100m backstroke	1:44.37	11	did not advance	
Fanni Illes	S6	400m freestyle	6:43.09	9	did not advance	
Fanni Illes	SB5	100m breaststroke	2:06.29	8 Q	2:07.52	8
Fanni Illes	SM6	200m individual medley	3:58.59	13	did not advance	
Gitta Raczko	S7	50m butterfly	44.81	9	did not advance	
Gitta Raczko	SB5	100m breaststroke	1:56.88	5 Q	1:54.49	3rd place, bronze medalist(s)
Gitta Raczko	SM7	200m individual medley	3:28.30	6 Q	3:30.36	8
Diana Zambo	S5	50m backstroke	51.19	4 Q	52.04	6
Diana Zambo	S5	200m freestyle	3:56.25	14	did not advance	

=== Table tennis ===
Athlete	Event	Preliminaries				Quarterfinals	Semifinals	Final / BM	
Athlete	Event	Opposition Result	Opposition Result	Opposition Result	Rank	Opposition Result	Opposition Result	Opposition Result	Rank
Andras Csonka	Men's singles C8	Chen G (CHN); L 0-3	Skrzynecki (POL); W 3-1	Vergeylen (BEL); W 3-0	2	did not advance			
Dezso Berecki	Men's singles C9-10	Agunbiade (NGR); L 1–3	Karabec (CZE); W 3–1	—N/a	1 Q	Last (NED); L 0–3	did not advance		
Gyula Zborai	Men's singles C9-10	Ge Y (CHN); L 0-3	Rousseau (FRA); L 2-3	—N/a	3	did not advance			
Dezso Berecki; Gyula Zborai	Men's team C9-10	—N/a				France (FRA); L 1-3	did not advance		

=== Wheelchair fencing ===
Pál Szekeres won his last competitive medal at his fifth and final consecutive Paralympics: he won a bronze medal in the men's foil.

==== Men ====
Athlete	Event	Qualification			Round of 16	Quarterfinal	Semifinal	Final / BM	
Athlete	Event	Opposition	Score	Rank	Opposition Score	Opposition Score	Opposition Score	Opposition Score	Rank
Gabor Horvath	Men's épée A	Tian (CHN)	L 0–5	6	did not advance				
Gabor Horvath	Men's épée A	Wong T T (HKG)	L 4-5	6	did not advance				
Gabor Horvath	Men's épée A	Betti (ITA)	L 0-5	6	did not advance				
Gabor Horvath	Men's épée A	Stanczuk (POL)	L 3-5	6	did not advance				
Gabor Horvath	Men's épée A	Alqallaf (KUW)	L 1-5	6	did not advance				
Gabor Horvath	Men's foil A	Zhang L (CHN)	L 1-5	4 Q	Maillard (FRA); L 3-15	did not advance			
Gabor Horvath	Men's foil A	Betti (ITA)	L 0-5	4 Q	Maillard (FRA); L 3-15	did not advance			
Gabor Horvath	Men's foil A	Alqallaf (KUW)	L 4-5	4 Q	Maillard (FRA); L 3-15	did not advance			
Gabor Horvath	Men's foil A	Granell (ESP)	W 5-4	4 Q	Maillard (FRA); L 3-15	did not advance			
Gabor Horvath	Men's foil A	Saengsawang (THA)	W 5-1	4 Q	Maillard (FRA); L 3-15	did not advance			
Gabor Horvath	Men's foil A	Andree (GER)	L 5-1	4 Q	Maillard (FRA); L 3-15	did not advance			
Gyula Mato	Men's foil A	Pender (POL)	L 1-5	4 Q	Chan W K (HKG); L 11-15	did not advance			
Gyula Mato	Men's foil A	Pellegrini (ITA)	L 1-5	4 Q	Chan W K (HKG); L 11-15	did not advance			
Gyula Mato	Men's foil A	Maillard (FRA)	L 2-5	4 Q	Chan W K (HKG); L 11-15	did not advance			
Gyula Mato	Men's foil A	Alhaddad (KUW)	W 5-1	4 Q	Chan W K (HKG); L 11-15	did not advance			
Gyula Mato	Men's foil A	Andreev (RUS)	W 5-4	4 Q	Chan W K (HKG); L 11-15	did not advance			
Gyula Mato	Men's sabre A	Ye R (CHN)	L 0-5	3 Q	Stanczuk (POL); L 12-15	did not advance			
Gyula Mato	Men's sabre A	Stanczuk (POL)	W 5-2	3 Q	Stanczuk (POL); L 12-15	did not advance			
Gyula Mato	Men's sabre A	Citerne (FRA)	L 2-5	3 Q	Stanczuk (POL); L 12-15	did not advance			
Gyula Mato	Men's sabre A	Andreev (RUS)	W 5-3	3 Q	Stanczuk (POL); L 12-15	did not advance			
Gyula Mato	Men's sabre A	Alexakis (GRE)	W 5-2	3 Q	Stanczuk (POL); L 12-15	did not advance			
Pál Szekeres	Men's foil B	Hu D (CHN)	L 2-5	3 Q	Hisakawa (JPN); W 15-6	Hui C H (HKG); W 15-11	Hu D (CHN); L 4-15	Komar (UKR); W 15-10	3rd place, bronze medalist(s)
Pál Szekeres	Men's foil B	Hui C H (HKG)	L 3-5	3 Q	Hisakawa (JPN); W 15-6	Hui C H (HKG); W 15-11	Hu D (CHN); L 4-15	Komar (UKR); W 15-10	3rd place, bronze medalist(s)
Pál Szekeres	Men's foil B	Komar (UKR)	W 5-1	3 Q	Hisakawa (JPN); W 15-6	Hui C H (HKG); W 15-11	Hu D (CHN); L 4-15	Komar (UKR); W 15-10	3rd place, bronze medalist(s)
Pál Szekeres	Men's foil B	Moreno (USA)	W 5-1	3 Q	Hisakawa (JPN); W 15-6	Hui C H (HKG); W 15-11	Hu D (CHN); L 4-15	Komar (UKR); W 15-10	3rd place, bronze medalist(s)
Pál Szekeres	Men's foil B	Kim G H (KOR)	W 5-1	3 Q	Hisakawa (JPN); W 15-6	Hui C H (HKG); W 15-11	Hu D (CHN); L 4-15	Komar (UKR); W 15-10	3rd place, bronze medalist(s)
Pál Szekeres	Men's sabre B	Francois (FRA)	L 3-5	3 Q	Hui C H (HKG); L 12-15	did not advance			
Pál Szekeres	Men's sabre B	Shenkevych (UKR)	L 4-5	3 Q	Hui C H (HKG); L 12-15	did not advance			
Pál Szekeres	Men's sabre B	Fawcett (GBR)	W 5-2	3 Q	Hui C H (HKG); L 12-15	did not advance			
Pál Szekeres	Men's sabre B	Arnau (ESP)	L 3-5	3 Q	Hui C H (HKG); L 12-15	did not advance			
Pál Szekeres	Men's sabre B	Mainville (CAN)	W 5-1	3 Q	Hui C H (HKG); L 12-15	did not advance			

==== Women ====
Athlete	Event	Qualification			Round of 16	Quarterfinal	Semifinal	Final / BM	
Athlete	Event	Opposition	Score	Rank	Opposition Score	Opposition Score	Opposition Score	Opposition Score	Rank
Gyongyi Dani	Women's épée B	Jana (THA)	L 0-5	4 Q	—N/a	Yao F (CHN); L 12-15	did not advance		
Gyongyi Dani	Women's épée B	Chan Y C (HKG)	L 4-5	4 Q	—N/a	Yao F (CHN); L 12-15	did not advance		
Gyongyi Dani	Women's épée B	Ye H (CHN)	L 3-5	4 Q	—N/a	Yao F (CHN); L 12-15	did not advance		
Gyongyi Dani	Women's épée B	Lukianenko (UKR)	W 5-2	4 Q	—N/a	Yao F (CHN); L 12-15	did not advance		
Gyongyi Dani	Women's épée B	Hassen Bey (ESP)	W 5-1	4 Q	—N/a	Yao F (CHN); L 12-15	did not advance		
Gyongyi Dani	Women's foil B	Yao F (CHN)	L 1-5	2 Q	—N/a	Jana (THA); L 8-15	did not advance		
Gyongyi Dani	Women's foil B	Lukianenko (UKR)	W 5-3	2 Q	—N/a	Jana (THA); L 8-15	did not advance		
Gyongyi Dani	Women's foil B	Magnat (FRA)	W 5-3	2 Q	—N/a	Jana (THA); L 8-15	did not advance		
Gyongyi Dani	Women's foil B	Hassen Bey (ESP)	W 5-2	2 Q	—N/a	Jana (THA); L 8-15	did not advance		
Gyongyi Dani	Women's foil B	Vettraino (ITA)	W 5-3	2 Q	—N/a	Jana (THA); L 8-15	did not advance		
Veronika Juhasz	Women's épée A	Yu C Y (HKG)	L 3–5	2 Q	—N/a	Fan P S (HKG); L 12-15	did not advance		
Veronika Juhasz	Women's épée A	Witos-Eze (POL)	W 5-3	2 Q	—N/a	Fan P S (HKG); L 12-15	did not advance		
Veronika Juhasz	Women's épée A	Halkina (BLR)	W 5-3	2 Q	—N/a	Fan P S (HKG); L 12-15	did not advance		
Veronika Juhasz	Women's épée A	Zhang W (CHN)	W 5-4	2 Q	—N/a	Fan P S (HKG); L 12-15	did not advance		
Veronika Juhasz	Women's épée A	Poignet (FRA)	W 5-4	2 Q	—N/a	Fan P S (HKG); L 12-15	did not advance		
Veronika Juhasz	Women's foil A	Zhang C (CHN)	L 0-5	6	did not advance				
Veronika Juhasz	Women's foil A	Yu C Y (HKG)	L 1-5	6	did not advance				
Veronika Juhasz	Women's foil A	Trigilia (ITA)	L 3-5	6	did not advance				
Veronika Juhasz	Women's foil A	Picot (FRA)	L 3-5	6	did not advance				
Veronika Juhasz	Women's foil A	Halkina (BLR)	L 2-5	6	did not advance				
Zsuzsanna Krajnyak	Women's épée A	Zhang C (CHN)	L 3-5	3 Q	—N/a	Gorlina (UKR); W 15-5	Zhang C (CHN); L 10-15	Fan P S (HKG); L 14-15	4
Zsuzsanna Krajnyak	Women's épée A	Gorlina (UKR)	L 3-5	3 Q	—N/a	Gorlina (UKR); W 15-5	Zhang C (CHN); L 10-15	Fan P S (HKG); L 14-15	4
Zsuzsanna Krajnyak	Women's épée A	Fan P S (HKG)	W 5-4	3 Q	—N/a	Gorlina (UKR); W 15-5	Zhang C (CHN); L 10-15	Fan P S (HKG); L 14-15	4
Zsuzsanna Krajnyak	Women's épée A	Trigilia (ITA)	W 5-2	3 Q	—N/a	Gorlina (UKR); W 15-5	Zhang C (CHN); L 10-15	Fan P S (HKG); L 14-15	4
Zsuzsanna Krajnyak	Women's épée A	Picot (FRA)	W 5-0	3 Q	—N/a	Gorlina (UKR); W 15-5	Zhang C (CHN); L 10-15	Fan P S (HKG); L 14-15	4
Zsuzsanna Krajnyak	Women's foil A	Poignet (FRA)	L 3-5	3 Q	—N/a	Yu C Y (HKG); L 1-15	did not advance		
Zsuzsanna Krajnyak	Women's foil A	Fan P S (HKG)	W 5-1	3 Q	—N/a	Yu C Y (HKG); L 1-15	did not advance		
Zsuzsanna Krajnyak	Women's foil A	Zhang W (CHN)	L 4-5	3 Q	—N/a	Yu C Y (HKG); L 1-15	did not advance		
Zsuzsanna Krajnyak	Women's foil A	Gorlina (UKR)	L 2-5	3 Q	—N/a	Yu C Y (HKG); L 1-15	did not advance		
Zsuzsanna Krajnyak	Women's foil A	Witos-Eze (POL)	W 5-0	3 Q	—N/a	Yu C Y (HKG); L 1-15	did not advance		
Judit Palfi	Women's épée B	Vasilyeva (RUS)	L 3-5	5 Q	Vettraino (ITA); W 15-9	Jana (THA); L 4-15	did not advance		
Judit Palfi	Women's épée B	Yao F (CHN)	L 3-5	5 Q	Vettraino (ITA); W 15-9	Jana (THA); L 4-15	did not advance		
Judit Palfi	Women's épée B	Magnat (FRA)	L 4-5	5 Q	Vettraino (ITA); W 15-9	Jana (THA); L 4-15	did not advance		
Judit Palfi	Women's épée B	Vettraino (ITA)	L 1-5	5 Q	Vettraino (ITA); W 15-9	Jana (THA); L 4-15	did not advance		
Judit Palfi	Women's épée B	Demello (USA)	W 5-3	5 Q	Vettraino (ITA); W 15-9	Jana (THA); L 4-15	did not advance		
Judit Palfi	Women's foil B	Chan Y C (HKG)	L 3-5	4 Q	—N/a	Chan Y C (HKG); L 4-15	did not advance		
Judit Palfi	Women's foil B	Ye H (CHN)	L 3-5	4 Q	—N/a	Chan Y C (HKG); L 4-15	did not advance		
Judit Palfi	Women's foil B	Jana (THA)	L 1-5	4 Q	—N/a	Chan Y C (HKG); L 4-15	did not advance		
Judit Palfi	Women's foil B	Vasilyeva (RUS)	W 5-4	4 Q	—N/a	Chan Y C (HKG); L 4-15	did not advance		
Judit Palfi	Women's foil B	Demello (USA)	W 5-0	4 Q	—N/a	Chan Y C (HKG); L 4-15	did not advance		

=== Wheelchair tennis ===
Athlete	Event	Round of 64	Round of 32	Round of 16	Quarterfinals	Semifinals	Finals
Athlete	Event	Opposition Result	Opposition Result	Opposition Result	Opposition Result	Opposition Result	Opposition Result
Laszlo Farkas	Men's singles	Scheffers (NED); L 3-6, 4-6	did not advance				
Csaba Prohaszka	Men's singles	Tur (ESP); L 1-6, 1-6	did not advance				
Laszlo Farkas; Csaba Prohaszka	Men's doubles	—N/a	Illobre (ESP) / Tur (ESP); L 2-6, 2-6	did not advance			

== See also ==
- 2008 Summer Paralympics
- Hungary at the Paralympics
- Hungary at the 2008 Summer Olympics
