= Wheelchair fencing at the 2008 Summer Paralympics – Men's sabre B =

Men's sabre B at the XIII Paralympic Games
- Paralympic Wheelchair fencing
- Venue: Olympic Green Convention Center
- Dates: 17 September
- Competitors: 18 from 12 nations

Medalists
1st place, gold medalist(s)		Laurent François	France
2nd place, silver medalist(s)		Hui Charn Hung	Hong Kong
3rd place, bronze medalist(s)		Serhiy Shenkevych	Ukraine

The men's sabre B wheelchair fencing competition at the 2008 Summer Paralympics was held on 17 September at the Olympic Green Convention Center.

The competition began with a preliminary stage where fencers were divided into three pools and played a round robin tournament. In this stage, the winner of a bout was the first person to score five hits or the person with the highest score at the end of four minutes. Next was a knock-out stage, where fencers competed in three three-minute bouts with a one-minute break between each. The winner was the first to reach fifteen hits, or the one with the highest score at the end of the last bout. In the event of a tie, another one-minute bout was held, with the winner being the first to score a hit.

The event was won by Laurent Francois, representing France.

== Results ==
=== Preliminaries ===
==== Pool A ====
Rank	Competitor	MP	W	L	Points	FRA	UKR	HUN	GBR	ESP	CAN
1	Laurent François (FRA)	5	5	0	25:10	x	5:3	5:3	5:0	5:3	5:1
2	Serhiy Shenkevych (UKR)	5	4	1	23:18	3:5	x	5:4	5:3	5:4	5:2
3	Pál Szekeres (HUN)	5	2	3	20:19	3:5	4:5	x	5:3	3:5	5:1
4	Lee Fawcett (GBR)	5	2	3	16:18	0:5	3:5	3:5	x	5:0	5:3
5	Juan Arnau (ESP)	5	2	3	17:21	3:5	4:5	5:3	0:5	x	5:3
6	Pierre Mainville (CAN)	5	0	5	10:25	1:5	2:5	1:5	3:5	3:5	x

==== Pool B ====
Rank	Competitor	MP	W	L	Points	FRA	GRE	UKR	ITA	POL	USA
1	Marc-André Cratère (FRA)	5	5	0	25:14	x	5:4	5:1	5:4	5:3	5:2
2	Emmanouil Bogdos (GRE)	5	4	1	24:16	4:5	x	5:4	5:3	5:3	5:1
3	Anton Datsko (UKR)	5	3	2	20:17	1:5	4:5	x	5:3	5:2	5:2
4	Alessio Sarri (ITA)	5	2	3	20:18	4:5	3:5	3:5	x	5:3	5:0
5	Piotr Czop (POL)	5	1	4	16:23	3:5	3:5	2:5	3:5	x	5:3
6	Benjy Williams (USA)	5	0	5	8:25	2:5	1:5	2:5	0:5	3:5	x

==== Pool C ====
Rank	Competitor	MP	W	L	Points	ITA	HKG	POL	RUS	ESP	USA
1	Gerardo Mari (ITA)	5	4	1	23:15	x	5:4	3:5	5:1	5:3	5:2
2	Hui Charn Hung (HKG)	5	3	2	21:16	4:5	x	5:1	5:4	2:5	5:1
3	Grzegorz Pluta (POL)	5	3	2	20:17	5:3	1:5	x	4:5	5:2	5:2
4	Marat Yusupov (RUS)	5	3	2	20:18	1:5	4:5	5:4	x	5:0	5:4
5	Carlos Soler (ESP)	5	2	3	15:19	3:5	5:2	2:5	0:5	x	5:2
6	Gerard Moreno (USA)	5	0	5	11:25	2:5	1:5	2:5	4:5	2:5	x

=== Competition bracket ===
Round of 16
Anton Datsko (UKR)	8
Marat Yusupov (RUS)	15
Serhiy Shenkevych (UKR)	15
Lee Fawcett (GBR)	4
Juan Arnau (ESP)	7
Gerardo Mari (ITA)	15
Emmanouil Bogdos (GRE)	14
Carlos Soler (ESP)	15
Hui Charn Hung (HKG)	15
Pál Szekeres (HUN)	12
Grzegorz Pluta (POL)	14
Alessio Sarri (ITA)	15

Quarterfinals
Laurent François (FRA)	15
Marat Yusupov (RUS)	9
Serhiy Shenkevych (UKR)	15
Gerardo Mari (ITA)	5
Carlos Soler (ESP)	10
Hui Charn Hung (HKG)	15
Alessio Sarri (ITA)	13
Marc-André Cratère (FRA)	15

Semifinals
Laurent François (FRA)	15
Serhiy Shenkevych (UKR)	8
Hui Charn Hung (HKG)	15
Marc-André Cratère (FRA)	14

Final
Laurent François (FRA)	15
Hui Charn Hung (HKG)	9
Third place
Serhiy Shenkevych (UKR)	15
Marc-André Cratère (FRA)	8
