= Wheelchair fencing at the 2008 Summer Paralympics – Men's foil A =

Men's foil A at the XIII Paralympic Games
- Paralympic Wheelchair fencing
- Venue: Olympic Green Convention Center
- Dates: 14 September
- Competitors: 19 from 13 nations

Medalists
1st place, gold medalist(s)		Ye Ruyi	China
2nd place, silver medalist(s)		Zhang Lei	China
3rd place, bronze medalist(s)		Dariusz Pender	Poland

The men's foil A wheelchair fencing competition at the 2008 Summer Paralympics was held on 14 September at the Olympic Green Convention Center.

The competition began with a preliminary stage where fencers were divided into three pools and played a round robin tournament. In this stage, the winner of a bout was the first person to score five hits or the person with the highest score at the end of four minutes. Next was a knock-out stage, where fencers competed in three three-minute bouts with a one-minute break between each. The winner was the first to reach fifteen hits, or the one with the highest score at the end of the last bout. In the event of a tie, another one-minute bout was held, with the winner being the first to score a hit.

The event was won by Ye Ruyi, representing China.

== Results ==
=== Preliminaries ===
==== Pool A ====
Rank	Competitor	MP	W	L	Points	CHN	ITA	KUW	HUN	ESP	THA	GER
1	Zhang Lei (CHN)	6	6	0	30:2	x	5:0	5:0	5:1	5:0	5:1	5:0
2	Matteo Betti (ITA)	6	5	1	25:9	0:5	x	5:0	5:0	5:0	5:2	5:2
3	Tariq Alqallaf (KUW)	6	4	2	20:16	0:5	0:5	x	5:4	5:0	5:1	5:1
4	Gabor Horvath (HUN)	6	3	3	20:21	1:5	0:5	4:5	x	5:4	5:1	5:1
5	Fernando Granell (ESP)	6	2	4	14:27	0:5	0:5	0:5	4:5	x	5:4	5:3
6	Korakod Saengsawang (THA)	6	1	5	14:28	1:5	2:5	1:5	1:5	4:5	x	5:3
7	Christian Andree (GER)	6	0	6	10:30	0:5	2:5	1:5	1:5	3:5	3:5	x

==== Pool B ====
Rank	Competitor	MP	W	L	Points	POL	ITA	FRA	HUN	KUW	RUS
1	Dariusz Pender (POL)	5	5	0	25:10	x	5:2	5:4	5:1	5:3	5:0
2	Alberto Pellegrini (ITA)	5	4	1	22:12	2:5	x	5:1	5:1	5:4	5:1
3	David Maillard (FRA)	5	2	3	19:18	4:5	1:5	x	5:2	5:1	4:5
4	Gyula Mato (HUN)	5	2	3	14:20	1:5	1:5	2:5	x	5:1	5:4
5	Abdullah Alhaddad (KUW)	5	1	4	14:22	3:5	4:5	1:5	1:5	x	5:2
6	Ivan Andreev (RUS)	5	1	4	12:24	0:5	1:5	5:4	4:5	2:5	x

==== Pool C ====
Rank	Competitor	MP	W	L	Points	CHN	HKG	UKR	POL	RUS	USA
1	Ye Ruyi (CHN)	5	5	0	25:6	x	5:2	5:0	5:1	5:2	5:1
2	Chan Wing Kin (HKG)	5	4	1	22:11	2:5	x	5:3	5:1	5:2	5:0
3	Mykhaylo Bazhukov (UKR)	5	2	3	16:17	0:5	3:5	x	3:5	5:1	5:1
4	Stefan Makowski (POL)	5	2	3	16:22	1:5	1:5	5:3	x	5:4	4:5
5	Sergey Frolov (RUS)	5	1	4	14:24	2:5	2:5	1:5	4:5	x	5:4
6	Mark Calhoun (USA)	5	1	4	11:24	1:5	0:5	1:5	5:4	4:5	x

=== Competition bracket ===
Round of 16
Gabor Horvath (HUN)	3
David Maillard (FRA)	15
Chan Wing Kin (HKG)	15
Gyula Mato (HUN)	11
Fernando Granell (ESP)	5
Matteo Betti (ITA)	15
Dariusz Pender (POL)	15
Abdullah Alhaddad (KUW)	6
Alberto Pellegrini (ITA)	15
Stefan Makowski (POL)	10
Tariq Alqallaf (KUW)	15
Mykhaylo Bazhukov (UKR)	9
Sergey Frolov (RUS)	9
Ye Ruyi (CHN)	15

Quarterfinals
Zhang Lei (CHN)	15
David Maillard (FRA)	3
Chan Wing Kin (HKG)	15
Matteo Betti (ITA)	14
Dariusz Pender (POL)	15
Alberto Pellegrini (ITA)	9
Tariq Alqallaf (KUW)	6
Ye Ruyi (CHN)	15

Semifinals
Zhang Lei (CHN)	15
Chan Wing Kin (HKG)	5
Dariusz Pender (POL)	4
Ye Ruyi (CHN)	15

Final
Zhang Lei (CHN)	12
Ye Ruyi (CHN)	15
Third place
Chan Wing Kin (HKG)	9
Dariusz Pender (POL)	15
