= Wheelchair fencing at the 2008 Summer Paralympics – Men's foil B =

Men's foil B at the XIII Paralympic Games
- Paralympic Wheelchair fencing
- Venue: Olympic Green Convention Center
- Dates: 14 September
- Competitors: 18 from 14 nations

Medalists
1st place, gold medalist(s)		Hu Daoliang	China
2nd place, silver medalist(s)		Laurent Francois	France
3rd place, bronze medalist(s)		Pál Szekeres	Hungary

The men's foil B wheelchair fencing competition at the 2008 Summer Paralympics was held on 14 September at the Olympic Green Convention Center.

The competition began with a preliminary stage where fencers were divided into three pools and played a round robin tournament. In this stage, the winner of a bout was the first person to score five hits or the person with the highest score at the end of four minutes. Next was a knock-out stage, where fencers competed in three three-minute bouts with a one-minute break between each. The winner was the first to reach fifteen hits, or the one with the highest score at the end of the last bout. In the event of a tie, another one-minute bout was held, with the winner being the first to score a hit.

The event was won by Hu Daoliang, representing China.

== Results ==
=== Preliminaries ===
==== Pool A ====
Rank	Competitor	MP	W	L	Points	ITA	FRA	POL	JPN	RUS	BLR
1	Alessio Sarri (ITA)	5	4	1	24:15	x	4:5	5:3	5:3	5:2	5:2
2	Alim Latreche (FRA)	5	4	1	24:18	5:4	x	4:5	5:3	5:2	5:4
3	Zbigniew Wyganowski (POL)	5	3	2	22:18	3:5	5:4	x	4:5	5:2	5:2
4	Toyoaki Hisakawa (JPN)	5	2	3	18:23	3:5	3:5	5:4	x	2:5	5:4
5	Marat Yusupov (RUS)	5	2	3	16:21	2:5	2:5	2:5	5:2	x	5:4
6	Mikalai Bezyazychny (BLR)	5	0	5	16:25	2:5	4:5	2:5	4:5	4:5	x

==== Pool B ====
Rank	Competitor	MP	W	L	Points	FRA	POL	UKR	USA	KUW	GBR
1	Laurent Francois (FRA)	5	5	0	25:8	x	5:2	5:0	5:2	5:3	5:1
2	Piotr Czop (POL)	5	3	2	21:15	2:5	x	5:1	5:2	5:2	4:5
3	Anton Datsko (UKR)	5	3	2	16:18	0:5	1:5	x	5:3	5:4	5:1
4	Scott Rodgers (USA)	5	2	3	17:19	2:5	2:5	3:5	x	5:4	5:0
5	Abdulwahab Alsaedi (KUW)	5	1	4	18:22	3:5	2:5	4:5	4:5	x	5:2
6	Lee Fawcett (GBR)	5	1	4	9:24	1:5	5:4	1:5	0:5	2:5	x

==== Pool C ====
Rank	Competitor	MP	W	L	Points	CHN	HKG	HUN	UKR	USA	KOR
1	Hu Daoliang (CHN)	5	5	0	25:9	x	5:1	5:2	5:2	5:3	5:1
2	Hui Charn Hung (HKG)	5	4	1	21:11	1:5	x	5:3	5:2	5:1	5:0
3	Pál Szekeres (HUN)	5	3	2	20:13	2:5	3:5	x	5:1	5:1	5:1
4	Andrii Komar (UKR)	5	2	3	15:20	2:5	2:5	1:5	x	5:1	5:4
5	Gerard Moreno (USA)	5	1	4	11:24	3:5	1:5	1:5	1:5	x	5:4
6	Kim Gi Hong (KOR)	5	0	5	10:25	1:5	0:5	1:5	4:5	4:5	x

=== Competition bracket ===
Round of 16
Zbigniew Wyganowski (POL)	12
Anton Datsko (UKR)	15
Alim Latreche (FRA)	15
Marat Yusupov (RUS)	8
Andrii Komar (UKR)	15
Alessio Sarri (ITA)	9
Hui Charn Hung (HKG)	15
Abdulwahab Alsaedi (KUW)	3
Pál Szekeres (HUN)	15
Toyoaki Hisakawa (JPN)	6
Piotr Czop (POL)	11
Scott Rodgers (USA)	15

Quarterfinals
Laurent Francois (FRA)	15
Anton Datsko (UKR)	10
Alim Latreche (FRA)	14
Andrii Komar (UKR)	15
Hui Charn Hung (HKG)	11
Pál Szekeres (HUN)	15
Scott Rodgers (USA)	10
Hu Daoliang (CHN)	15

Semifinals
Laurent Francois (FRA)	15
Andrii Komar (UKR)	8
Pál Szekeres (HUN)	4
Hu Daoliang (CHN)	15

Final
Laurent Francois (FRA)	8
Hu Daoliang (CHN)	15
Third place
Andrii Komar (UKR)	10
Pál Szekeres (HUN)	15
