= Wheelchair fencing at the 2008 Summer Paralympics – Men's sabre A =

Men's sabre A at the XIII Paralympic Games
- Paralympic Wheelchair fencing
- Venue: Olympic Green Convention Center
- Dates: 17 September
- Competitors: 19 from 12 nations

Medalists
1st place, gold medalist(s)		Ye Ruyi	China
2nd place, silver medalist(s)		Tian Jianquan	China
3rd place, bronze medalist(s)		Alberto Pellegrini	Italy

The men's sabre A wheelchair fencing competition at the 2008 Summer Paralympics was held on 17 September at the Olympic Green Convention Center.

The competition began at a preliminary stage, with fencers divided into three pools for a round robin tournament. In this stage, the winner of a bout was the first person to score five hits or the person with the highest score at the end of four minutes. Next was a knock-out stage, where fencers competed in three three-minute bouts with a one-minute break between each. The winner was the first to reach fifteen hits, or the one with the highest score at the end of the last bout. In the event of a tie, another one-minute bout was held, with the winner being the first to score a hit.

The event was won by Ye Ruyi, representing China.

== Results ==
=== Preliminaries ===
==== Pool A ====
Rank	Competitor	MP	W	L	Points	ITA	FRA	POL	USA	RUS	ESP	KUW
1	Alberto Pellegrini (ITA)	6	5	1	26:10	x	1:5	5:4	5:0	5:0	5:0	5:1
2	Cyril More (FRA)	6	5	1	27:15	5:1	x	2:5	5:2	5:1	5:3	5:3
3	Stefan Makowski (POL)	6	4	2	28:22	4:5	5:2	x	5:4	4:5	5:3	5:3
4	Mark Calhoun (USA)	6	3	3	21:24	0:5	2:5	4:5	x	5:2	5:3	5:4
5	Sergey Frolov (RUS)	6	3	3	18:26	0:5	1:5	5:4	2:5	x	5:3	5:4
6	Luis Sanchez (ESP)	6	1	5	17:27	0:5	3:5	3:5	3:5	3:5	x	5:2
7	Ahmad Altabbakh (KUW)	6	0	6	17:30	1:5	3:5	3:5	4:5	4:5	2:5	x

==== Pool B ====
Rank	Competitor	MP	W	L	Points	CHN	POL	HUN	FRA	RUS	GRE
1	Ye Ruyi (CHN)	5	5	0	25:7	x	5:2	5:0	5:0	5:1	5:4
2	Radoslaw Stanczuk (POL)	5	3	2	19:18	2:5	x	2:5	5:3	5:4	5:1
3	Gyula Mato (HUN)	5	3	2	17:17	0:5	5:2	x	2:5	5:3	5:2
4	Robert Citerne (FRA)	5	2	3	17:18	0:5	3:5	5:2	x	4:5	5:1
5	Ivan Andreev (RUS)	5	2	3	18:23	1:5	4:5	3:5	5:4	x	5:4
6	Georgios Alexakis (GRE)	5	0	5	12:25	4:5	1:5	2:5	1:5	4:5	x

==== Pool C ====
Rank	Competitor	MP	W	L	Points	CHN	HKG	GRE	UKR	ITA	ESP
1	Tian Jianquan (CHN)	5	5	0	25:9	x	5:3	5:1	5:3	5:1	5:1
2	Chan Wing Kin (HKG)	5	4	1	23:12	3:5	x	5:2	5:0	5:3	5:2
3	G. Pylarinos Markantonatos (GRE)	5	3	2	18:16	1:5	2:5	x	5:2	5:4	5:0
4	Mykola Davydenko (UKR)	5	2	3	15:19	3:5	0:5	2:5	x	5:3	5:1
5	Alberto Serafini (ITA)	5	1	4	16:22	1:5	3:5	4:5	3:5	x	5:2
6	Luis Miguel Redondo (ESP)	5	0	5	6:25	1:5	2:5	0:5	1:5	2:5	x

=== Competition bracket ===
Round of 16
Radoslaw Stanczuk (POL)	15
Gyula Mato (HUN)	12
Chan Wing Kin (HKG)	15
Robert Citerne (FRA)	13
Mykola Davydenko (UKR)	15
Cyril More (FRA)	13
Alberto Pellegrini (ITA)	15
Ivan Andreev (RUS)	6
Stefan Makowski (POL)	10
Sergey Frolov (RUS)	15
G. Pylarinos Markantonatos (GRE)	15
Mark Calhoun (USA)	8
Alberto Serafini (ITA)	3
Tian Jianquan (CHN)	15

Quarterfinals
Ye Ruyi (CHN)	15
Radoslaw Stanczuk (POL)	9
Chan Wing Kin (HKG)	15
Mykola Davydenko (UKR)	10
Alberto Pellegrini (ITA)	15
Sergey Frolov (RUS)	3
G. Pylarinos Markantonatos (GRE)	8
Tian Jianquan (CHN)	15

Semifinals
Ye Ruyi (CHN)	15
Chan Wing Kin (HKG)	11
Alberto Pellegrini (ITA)	8
Tian Jianquan (CHN)	15

Final
Ye Ruyi (CHN)	15
Tian Jianquan (CHN)	14
Third place
Chan Wing Kin (HKG)	5
Alberto Pellegrini (ITA)	15
