= Wheelchair fencing at the 2008 Summer Paralympics – Men's épée A =

Men's épée A at the XIII Paralympic Games
- Paralympic Wheelchair fencing
- Venue: Olympic Green Convention Center
- Dates: 15 September
- Competitors: 19 from 12 nations

Medalists
1st place, gold medalist(s)		Tian Jianquan	China
2nd place, silver medalist(s)		Zhang Lei	China
3rd place, bronze medalist(s)		Radoslaw Stanczuk	Poland

The men's épée A wheelchair fencing competition at the 2008 Summer Paralympics was held on 15 September at the Olympic Green Convention Center.

The competition began with a preliminary stage where fencers were divided into three pools and played a round robin tournament. In this stage, the winner of a bout was the first person to score five hits or the person with the highest score at the end of four minutes. Next was a knock-out stage, where fencers competed in three three-minute bouts with a one-minute break between each. The winner was the first to reach fifteen hits, or the one with the highest score at the end of the last bout. In the event of a tie, another one-minute bout was held, with the winner being the first to score a hit.

The event was won by Tian Jianquan, representing China.

== Results ==
=== Preliminaries ===
==== Pool A ====
Rank	Competitor	MP	W	L	Points	FRA	GRE	KUW	UKR	THA	ESP	ITA
1	David Maillard (FRA)	6	5	1	29:22	x	4:5	5:4	5:4	5:4	5:3	5:2
2	G. Pylarinos Markantonatos (GRE)	6	4	2	27:20	5:4	x	3:5	4:5	5:1	5:3	5:2
3	Abdullah Alhaddad (KUW)	6	4	2	25:18	4:5	5:3	x	1:5	5:4	5:0	5:1
4	Mykola Davydenko (UKR)	6	4	2	24:19	4:5	5:4	5:1	x	0:5	5:2	5:2
5	Korakod Saengsawang (THA)	6	3	3	24:18	4:5	1:5	4:5	5:0	x	5:0	5:3
6	Luis Sanchez (ESP)	6	1	5	13:26	3:5	3:5	0:5	2:5	0:5	x	5:1
7	Alberto Serafini (ITA)	6	0	6	11:30	2:5	2:5	1:5	2:5	3:5	1:5	x

==== Pool B ====
Rank	Competitor	MP	W	L	Points	CHN	FRA	POL	UKR	ESP	GER
1	Zhang Lei (CHN)	5	4	1	24:16	x	5:3	5:4	5:3	4:5	5:1
2	Robert Citerne (FRA)	5	3	2	22:15	3:5	x	5:2	4:5	5:2	5:1
3	Dariusz Pender (POL)	5	3	2	21:16	4:5	2:5	x	5:3	5:1	5:2
4	Mykhaylo Bazhukov (UKR)	5	3	2	21:20	3:5	5:4	3:5	x	5:2	5:4
5	Fernando Granell (ESP)	5	2	3	15:21	5:4	2:5	1:5	2:5	x	5:2
6	Christian Andree (GER)	5	0	5	10:25	1:5	1:5	2:5	4:5	2:5	x

==== Pool C ====
Rank	Competitor	MP	W	L	Points	CHN	HKG	ITA	POL	KUW	HUN
1	Tian Jianquan (CHN)	5	5	0	25:9	x	5:2	5:4	5:3	5:0	5:0
2	Wong Tang Tat (HKG)	5	4	1	22:20	2:5	x	5:4	5:4	5:3	5:4
3	Matteo Betti (ITA)	5	2	3	21:15	4:5	4:5	x	3:5	5:0	5:0
4	Radoslaw Stanczuk (POL)	5	2	3	20:21	3:5	4:5	5:3	x	3:5	5:3
5	Tariq Alqallaf (KUW)	5	2	3	13:19	0:5	3:5	0:5	5:3	x	5:1
6	Gabor Horvath (HUN)	5	0	5	8:25	0:5	4:5	0:5	3:5	1:5	x

=== Competition bracket ===
Round of 16
Robert Citerne (FRA)	15
Dariusz Pender (POL)	13
G. Pylarinos Markantonatos (GRE)	12
Matteo Betti (ITA)	15
Radoslaw Stanczuk (POL)	15
Wong Tang Tat (HKG)	11
Zhang Lei (CHN)	15
Fernando Granell (ESP)	7
Abdullah Alhaddad (KUW)	9
Korakod Saengsawang (THA)	15
Mykola Davydenko (UKR)	14
Mykhaylo Bazhukov (UKR)	15
Tariq Alqallaf (KUW)	7
David Maillard (FRA)	15

Quarterfinals
Tian Jianquan (CHN)	15
Robert Citerne (FRA)	12
Matteo Betti (ITA)	9
Radoslaw Stanczuk (POL)	15
Zhang Lei (CHN)	15
Korakod Saengsawang (THA)	9
Mykhaylo Bazhukov (UKR)	14
David Maillard (FRA)	15

Semifinals
Tian Jianquan (CHN)	15
Radoslaw Stanczuk (POL)	12
Zhang Lei (CHN)	15
David Maillard (FRA)	10

Final
Tian Jianquan (CHN)	15
Zhang Lei (CHN)	11
Third place
Radoslaw Stanczuk (POL)	15
David Maillard (FRA)	12
