= Wheelchair fencing at the 2008 Summer Paralympics – Women's épée A =

Women's épée A at the XIII Paralympic Games
- Paralympic Wheelchair fencing
- Venue: Olympic Green Convention Center
- Dates: 15 September
- Competitors: 12 from 8 nations

Medalists
1st place, gold medalist(s)		Zhang Chuncui	China
2nd place, silver medalist(s)		Yu Chui Yee	Hong Kong
3rd place, bronze medalist(s)		Fan Pui Shan	Hong Kong

The women's épée A wheelchair fencing competition at the 2008 Summer Paralympics was held on 15 September at the Olympic Green Convention Center.

The competition began with a preliminary stage where fencers were divided into two pools and played a round robin tournament. In this stage, the winner of a bout was the first person to score five hits or the person with the highest score at the end of four minutes. Next was a knock-out stage, where fencers competed in three three-minute bouts with a one-minute break between each. The winner was the first to reach fifteen hits, or the one with the highest score at the end of the last bout. In the event of a tie, another one-minute bout was held, with the winner being the first to score a hit.

The event was won by Zhang Chuncui, representing China.

== Results ==
=== Preliminaries ===
==== Pool A ====
Rank	Competitor	MP	W	L	Points	HKG	HUN	POL	BLR	CHN	FRA
1	Yu Chui Yee (HKG)	5	5	0	25:15	x	5:3	5:3	5:1	5:4	5:4
2	Veronika Juhasz (HUN)	5	4	1	23:18	3:5	x	5:3	5:3	5:3	5:4
3	Dagmara Witos-Eze (POL)	5	2	3	19:22	3:5	3:5	x	3:5	5:3	5:4
4	Aliona Halkina (BLR)	5	2	3	18:22	1:5	3:5	5:3	x	5:4	4:5
5	Zhang Wenxin (CHN)	5	1	4	19:21	4:5	3:5	3:5	4:5	x	5:1
6	Sabrina Poignet (FRA)	5	1	4	18:24	4:5	4:5	4:5	5:4	1:5	x

==== Pool B ====
Rank	Competitor	MP	W	L	Points	CHN	UKR	HUN	HKG	ITA	FRA
1	Zhang Chuncui (CHN)	5	5	0	25:14	x	5:4	5:3	5:4	5:2	5:1
2	Alla Gorlina (UKR)	5	3	2	23:18	4:5	x	5:3	4:5	5:3	5:2
3	Zsuzsanna Krajnyak (HUN)	5	3	2	21:16	3:5	3:5	x	5:4	5:2	5:0
4	Fan Pui Shan (HKG)	5	3	2	23:20	4:5	5:4	4:5	x	5:3	5:3
5	Loredana Trigilia (ITA)	5	1	4	15:22	2:5	3:5	2:5	3:5	x	5:2
6	Patricia Picot (FRA)	5	0	5	8:25	1:5	2:5	0:5	3:5	2:5	x

=== Competition bracket ===
Round of 16
Aliona Halkina (BLR)	11
Zhang Wenxin (CHN)	15

Quarterfinals
Zhang Chuncui (CHN)	15
Zhang Wenxin (CHN)	9
Zsuzsanna Krajnyak (HUN)	15
Alla Gorlina (UKR)	5
Veronika Juhasz (HUN)	12
Fan Pui Shan (HKG)	15
Dagmara Witos-Eze (POL)	6
Yu Chui Yee (HKG)	15

Semifinals
Zhang Chuncui (CHN)	15
Zsuzsanna Krajnyak (HUN)	10
Fan Pui Shan (HKG)	10
Yu Chui Yee (HKG)	15

Final
Zhang Chuncui (CHN)	15
Yu Chui Yee (HKG)	13
Third place
Zsuzsanna Krajnyak (HUN)	14
Fan Pui Shan (HKG)	15
