= Wheelchair fencing at the 2008 Summer Paralympics – Women's foil A =

Women's foil A at the XIII Paralympic Games
- Paralympic Wheelchair fencing
- Venue: Olympic Green Convention Center
- Dates: 16 September
- Competitors: 12 from 8 nations

Medalists
1st place, gold medalist(s)		Yu Chui Yee	Hong Kong
2nd place, silver medalist(s)		Zhang Chuncui	China
3rd place, bronze medalist(s)		Fan Pui Shan	Hong Kong

The women's foil A wheelchair fencing competition at the 2008 Summer Paralympics was held on 16 September at the Olympic Green Convention Center.

The competition began with a preliminary stage where fencers were divided into two pools and played a round robin tournament. In this stage, the winner of a bout was the first person to score five hits or the person with the highest score at the end of four minutes. Next was a knock-out stage, where fencers competed in three three-minute bouts with a one-minute break between each. The winner was the first to reach fifteen hits, or the one with the highest score at the end of the last bout. In the event of a tie, another one-minute bout was held, with the winner being the first to score a hit.

The event was won by Yu Chui Yee, representing Hong Kong.

== Results ==
=== Preliminaries ===
==== Pool A ====
Rank	Competitor	MP	W	L	Points	CHN	HKG	ITA	FRA	BLR	HUN
1	Zhang Chuncui (CHN)	5	5	0	25:6	x	5:3	5:0	5:1	5:2	5:0
2	Yu Chui Yee (HKG)	5	4	1	23:14	3:5	x	5:2	5:3	5:3	5:1
3	Loredana Trigilia (ITA)	5	3	2	17:20	0:5	2:5	x	5:4	5:3	5:3
4	Patricia Picot (FRA)	5	2	3	18:20	1:5	3:5	4:5	x	5:2	5:3
5	Aliona Halkina (BLR)	5	1	4	15:22	2:5	3:5	3:5	2:5	x	5:2
6	Veronika Juhasz (HUN)	5	0	5	9:25	0:5	1:5	3:5	3:5	2:5	x

==== Pool B ====
Rank	Competitor	MP	W	L	Points	FRA	HKG	HUN	CHN	UKR	POL
1	Sabrina Poignet (FRA)	5	5	0	25:7	x	5:1	5:3	5:1	5:0	5:2
2	Fan Pui Shan (HKG)	5	3	2	17:17	1:5	x	1:5	5:3	5:1	5:3
3	Zsuzsanna Krajnyak (HUN)	5	2	3	19:16	3:5	5:1	x	4:5	2:5	5:0
4	Zhang Wenxin (CHN)	5	2	3	17:20	1:5	3:5	5:4	x	5:1	3:5
5	Alla Gorlina (UKR)	5	2	3	12:17	0:5	1:5	5:2	1:5	x	5:0
6	Dagmara Witos-Eze (POL)	5	1	4	10:23	2:5	3:5	0:5	5:3	0:5	x

=== Competition bracket ===
Round of 16
Zhang Wenxin (CHN)	15
Alla Gorlina (UKR)	4

Quarterfinals
Zhang Chuncui (CHN)	15
Zhang Wenxin (CHN)	12
Loredana Trigilia (ITA)	13
Fan Pui Shan (HKG)	15
Yu Chui Yee (HKG)	15
Zsuzsanna Krajnyak (HUN)	1
Patricia Picot (FRA)	7
Sabrina Poignet (FRA)	15

Semifinals
Zhang Chuncui (CHN)	15
Fan Pui Shan (HKG)	1
Yu Chui Yee (HKG)	15
Sabrina Poignet (FRA)	6

Final
Zhang Chuncui (CHN)	13
Yu Chui Yee (HKG)	15
Third place
Fan Pui Shan (HKG)	15
Sabrina Poignet (FRA)	12
