= Wheelchair fencing at the 2008 Summer Paralympics =

Wheelchair fencing at the XIII Paralympic Games
- Paralympic Wheelchair fencing

Wheelchair fencing at the 2008 Summer Paralympics was held in the Fencing Gymnasium of the Olympic Green Convention Centre from 14 September to 17 September.

== Classification ==
Fencers were given a classification depending on the type and extent of their disability. The classification system allows fencers to compete against others with a similar level of function. Fencing has two classes, A and B. Wheelchairs were anchored to the ground during competition.

== Events ==
The five event types below were competed for both class A and class B, for a total of ten events.

- Men's épée
- Men's foil
- Men's sabre
- Women's épée
- Women's foil

== Participating countries ==
There were 84 fencers (60 male, 24 female) from 19 nations taking part in this sport.

- Belarus (2)
- Canada (1)
- China (9)
- France (9)
- Germany (1)
- Great Britain (1)
- Greece (3)
- Hong Kong (6)
- Hungary (7)
- Italy (7)
- Japan (1)
- Kuwait (4)
- Poland (7)
- Russia (5)
- South Korea (1)
- Spain (6)
- Thailand (2)
- Ukraine (7)
- United States (5)

== Medal summary ==
=== Medal table ===
This ranking sorts countries by the number of gold medals earned by their fencers (in this context a country is an entity represented by a National Paralympic Committee). The number of silver medals is taken into consideration next and then the number of bronze medals. If, after the above, countries are still tied, equal ranking is given and they are listed alphabetically.

Rank	Nation	Gold	Silver	Bronze	Total
1	China (CHN)	6	6	1	13
2	Hong Kong (HKG)	3	2	2	7
3	France (FRA)	1	1	0	2
4	Belarus (BLR)	0	1	0	1
5	Poland (POL)	0	0	2	2
5	Ukraine (UKR)	0	0	2	2
7	Hungary (HUN)	0	0	1	1
7	Italy (ITA)	0	0	1	1
7	Thailand (THA)	0	0	1	1
Totals (9 entries)		10	10	10	30

=== Men's events ===
Event	Gold	Silver	Bronze
Épée A	Tian Jianquan; China	Zhang Lei; China	Radoslaw Stanczuk; Poland
Épée B	Hu Daoliang; China	Mikalai Bezyazychny; Belarus	Serhiy Shenkevych; Ukraine
Foil A	Ye Ruyi; China	Zhang Lei; China	Dariusz Pender; Poland
Foil B	Hu Daoliang; China	Laurent François; France	Pál Szekeres; Hungary
Sabre A	Ye Ruyi; China	Tian Jianquan; China	Alberto Pellegrini; Italy
Sabre B	Laurent François; France	Hui Charn Hung; Hong Kong	Serhiy Shenkevych; Ukraine

=== Women's events ===
Event	Gold	Silver	Bronze
Épée A	Zhang Chuncui; China	Yu Chui Yee; Hong Kong	Fan Pui Shan; Hong Kong
Épée B	Chan Yui Chong; Hong Kong	Yao Fang; China	Saysunee Jana; Thailand
Foil A	Yu Chui Yee; Hong Kong	Zhang Chuncui; China	Fan Pui Shan; Hong Kong
Foil B	Chan Yui Chong; Hong Kong	Yao Fang; China	Ye Hua; China
