= Rowing at the 2008 Summer Paralympics – Women's single sculls =

Women's single sculls at the XIII Paralympic Games
- Paralympic Rowing
- Venue: Shunyi Olympic Rowing-Canoeing Park
- Dates: 9–11 September 2008
- Competitors: 12 from 12 nations

Medalists
1st place, gold medalist(s)		Helene Raynsford	Great Britain
2nd place, silver medalist(s)		Liudmila Vauchok	Belarus
3rd place, bronze medalist(s)		Laura Schwanger	United States

The women's single sculls rowing competition at the 2008 Summer Paralympics was held from 9 to 11 September at the Shunyi Olympic Rowing-Canoeing Park. The event was competed by Category A rowers, propelling boats by use of arms only.

Winners of two heats qualified for the A Final. The remainder rowed in two repechage heats, with the first two in each qualifying for the A Final, the remainder rowing in the B Final.

The event was won by Helene Raynsford, representing Great Britain.

== Results ==
=== Heats ===
==== Heat 1 ====
Rowed 9 September at 15:00.

Rank	Rower	Country	Time
1	Helene Raynsford	Great Britain	5:38.44
2	Liudmila Vauchok	Belarus	5:45.51
3	Martyna Snopek	Poland	6:05.13
4	Pascale Bercovitch	Israel	6:12.32
5	Lee Jong Rye	South Korea	6:24.04
6	Cho Ping	Hong Kong	6:38.46

==== Heat 2 ====
Rowed 9 September at 15:20.

Rank	Rower	Country	Time
1	Laura Schwanger	United States	6:01.78
2	Zhang Jinhong	China	6:11.02
3	Svitlana Kupriianova	Ukraine	6:13.49
4	Cláudia Santos	Brazil	6:14.76
5	Agnese Moro	Italy	6:26.38
6	Filomena Franco	Portugal	7:31.90

=== Repechage ===
==== Heat 1 ====
Rowed 10 September at 15:00.

Rank	Rower	Country	Time
1	Liudmila Vauchok	Belarus	6:22.26
2	Svitlana Kupriianova	Ukraine	6:28.44
3	Agnese Moro	Italy	7:01.36
4	Pascale Bercovitch	Israel	7:06.20
5	Cho Ping	Hong Kong	7:34.64

==== Heat 2 ====
Rowed 10 September at 15:20.

Rank	Rower	Country	Time
1	Zhang Jinhong	China	6:43.78
2	Cláudia Santos	Brazil	6:57.12
3	Martyna Snopek	Poland	7:00.71
4	Lee Jong Rye	South Korea	7:15.70
5	Filomena Franco	Portugal	8:29.90

=== Final Round ===
==== Final B ====
Rowed 11 September at 15:00.

Rank	Rower	Country	Time
1	Agnese Moro	Italy	7:01.24
2	Pascale Bercovitch	Israel	7:02.43
3	Lee Jong Rye	South Korea	7:11.48
4	Cho Ping	Hong Kong	7:41.06
5	Filomena Franco	Portugal	8:04.89
	Martyna Snopek	Poland	DNS

==== Final A ====
Rowed 11 September at 16:20.

Rank	Rower	Country	Time
1st place, gold medalist(s)	Helene Raynsford	Great Britain	6:12.93
2nd place, silver medalist(s)	Liudmila Vauchok	Belarus	6:25.44
3rd place, bronze medalist(s)	Laura Schwanger	United States	6:35.07
4	Svitlana Kupriianova	Ukraine	6:40.04
5	Zhang Jinhong	China	6:40.81
6	Cláudia Santos	Brazil	6:54.76
