= Belarus at the 2008 Summer Paralympics =

- IPC code: BLR
- NPC: Paralympic Committee of the Republic of Belarus

in Beijing
- Competitors: 33 in 5 sports
- Flag bearer: Ihar Fartunau
- Medals Ranked 21st: Gold 5 Silver 7 Bronze 1 Total 13

Summer Paralympics appearances (overview)
- 1996; 2000; 2004; 2008; 2012; 2016; 2020; 2024

Other related appearances
- Soviet Union (1988); Unified Team (1992)

Belarus competed at the 2008 Summer Paralympics in Beijing, People's Republic of China.

== Medallists ==
Medal	Name	Sport	Event
Gold	Tamara Sivakova	Athletics	Women's discus throw F12-13
Gold	Iryna Fiadotava; Alena Drazdova	Cycling	Women's road race B&VI 1-3
Gold	Sergei Punko	Swimming	Men's 400m freestyle S12
Gold	Raman Makarau	Swimming	Men's 100m butterfly S12
Gold	Dzmitry Salei	Swimming	Men's 100m butterfly S13
Silver	Volha Zinkevich	Athletics	Women's long jump F12
Silver	Tamara Sivakova	Athletics	Women's shot put F12-13
Silver	Iryna Fiadotava; Alena Drazdova	Cycling	Women's time trial B&VI 1-3
Silver	Liudmila Vauchok	Rowing	Women's single sculls
Silver	Sergei Punko	Swimming	Men's 100m breaststroke SB12
Silver	Sergei Punko	Swimming	Men's 100m butterfly S12
Silver	Mikalai Bezyazychny	Wheelchair fencing	Men's épée B
Bronze	Uladzimir Izotau	Swimming	Men's 100m breaststroke SB13

== Sports ==
=== Athletics ===
==== Men's track ====
Athlete	Class	Event	Heats		Semifinal		Final	
Athlete	Class	Event	Result	Rank	Result	Rank	Result	Rank
Ihar Barysionak	T12	Marathon	—N/a				2:42:33	15
Aliaksandr Daniliuk	T36	100m	—N/a				12.83	9
Aliaksandr Daniliuk	T36	200m	—N/a				26.61	7
Aliaksandr Daniliuk	T36	400m	—N/a				DNF	
Ihar Hartunau	T13	100m	11.54	10	did not advance			
Aliaksandr Kouzmichou	T12	400m	DNF		did not advance			

==== Men's field ====
Athlete	Class	Event	Final		
Athlete	Class	Event	Result	Points	Rank
Yury Buchkou	F11-12	Discus throw	43.43	855	8
Yury Buchkou	F11-12	Shot put	14.98	924	5
Siarhei Burdukou	F12	Long jump	6.75	-	5
Siarhei Burdukou	F12	Triple jump	13.30	-	6
Siarhei Hrybanau	F11-12	Discus throw	30.21	594	10
Siarhei Hrybanau	F11-12	Shot put	15.35	947	4
Viktar Khilmonchyk	F42	Discus throw	38.89	-	8
Viktar Khilmonchyk	F42	Shot put	11.68	-	10
Aliaksandr Kouzmichou	F12	Triple jump	14.28	-	4
Ruslan Sivitski	F12	Triple jump	13.91	-	5
Aliaksandr Subota	F46	Long jump	6.46 SB	-	5
Aliaksandr Tryputs	F11-12	Javelin throw	52.40	926	5
Aliaksandr Tryputs	P12	Pentathlon	DNS		
Viktar Zhukousky	F11	Long jump	5.41	-	8
Viktar Zhukousky	F11	Triple jump	11.53	-	8

==== Women's track ====
Athlete	Class	Event	Heats		Semifinal		Final	
Athlete	Class	Event	Result	Rank	Result	Rank	Result	Rank
Anna Kaniouk	T12	100m	DSQ		did not advance			
Katsiaryna Kirushchanka	T38	100m	14.79	7 q	—N/a		14.79	6
Katsiaryna Kirushchanka	T38	200m	30.79	7 q	—N/a		31.00	7
Iryna Leantsiuk	T46	100m	12.91	8 q	—N/a		13.00	8
Iryna Leantsiuk	T46	200m	26.93	8 Q	—N/a		27.11	8
Aksana Sivitskaya	T13	100m	13.91	14	did not advance			
Volha Zinkevich	T12	100m	12.81	4 Q	12.67	3 Q	12.71	4
Volha Zinkevich	T12	200m	26.17	4 Q	26.07	5	did not advance	
Volha Zinkevich	T12	400m	DNF		did not advance			

==== Women's field ====
Athlete	Class	Event	Final		
Athlete	Class	Event	Result	Points	Rank
Anna Kaniouk	F12	Long jump	5.56	-	5
Tamara Sivakova	F12-13	Discus throw	41.29	970	1st place, gold medalist(s)
Tamara Sivakova	F12-13	Shot put	12.13	972	2nd place, silver medalist(s)
Aksana Sivitskaya	F13	Long jump	5.22	-	6
Volha Zinkevich	F12	Long jump	5.81	-	2nd place, silver medalist(s)

=== Cycling ===
==== Men's track ====
Athlete	Event	Time	Rank
Vasili Shaptsiaboi; Andrei Piutsevich (pilot)	Men's road race B&VI 1-3	DNF	
Vasili Shaptsiaboi; Andrei Piutsevich (pilot)	Men's road time trial B&VI 1-3	33:30.42	8

==== Women's road ====
Athlete	Event	Time	Rank
Iryna Fiadotava; Alena Drazdova (pilot)	Women's road race B&VI 1-3	1:55:35	1st place, gold medalist(s)
Iryna Fiadotava; Alena Drazdova (pilot)	Women's road time trial B&VI 1-3	36:59.98	2nd place, silver medalist(s)
Iryna Parkhamovich; Alesia Belaichuk (pilot)	Women's road race B&VI 1-3	2:01:20	6
Iryna Parkhamovich; Alesia Belaichuk (pilot)	Women's road time trial B&VI 1-3	40:19.02	8

==== Women's track ====
Athlete	Event	Qualification		Final	
Athlete	Event	Time	Rank	Opposition Time	Rank
Iryna Fiadotava; Alena Drazdova (pilot)	Women's individual pursuit B&VI 1-3	3:54.322	6	did not advance	
Iryna Parkhamovich; Alesia Belaichuk (pilot)	Women's individual pursuit B&VI 1-3	4:02.820	9	did not advance	

=== Rowing ===
Athlete	Event	Heats		Repechage		Final	
Athlete	Event	Time	Rank	Time	Rank	Time	Rank
Liudmila Vauchok	Women's single sculls	5:45.51	2 R	6:22.26	1 FA	6:25.44	2nd place, silver medalist(s)

=== Swimming ===
==== Men ====
Athlete	Class	Event	Heats		Final	
Athlete	Class	Event	Result	Rank	Result	Rank
Uladzimir Izotau	S13	100m butterfly	1:03.20	11	did not advance	
Uladzimir Izotau	SB13	100m breaststroke	1:10.91	5 Q	1:08.90	3rd place, bronze medalist(s)
Raman Makarau	S12	100m backstroke	1:03.75	3 Q	1:02.83	4
Raman Makarau	S12	100m butterfly	59.08 PR	1 Q	56.90 WR	1st place, gold medalist(s)
Raman Makarau	S12	50m freestyle	25.39	4 Q	25.02	4
Raman Makarau	S12	100m freestyle	55.29	5 Q	54.77	4
Raman Makarau	SM12	200m individual medley	2:21.57	7 Q	2:18.92	5
Sergei Punko	S12	100m butterfly	1:00.29 PR	2 Q	59.72	2nd place, silver medalist(s)
Sergei Punko	S12	50m freestyle	26.17	7 Q	25.97	8
Sergei Punko	S12	100m freestyle	55.67	6 Q	54.99	5
Sergei Punko	S12	400m freestyle	4:31.11	3 Q	4:08.64 WR	1st place, gold medalist(s)
Sergei Punko	SB12	100m breaststroke	1:12.18	2 Q	1:09.71	2nd place, silver medalist(s)
Sergei Punko	SM12	200m individual medley	2:19.43	3 Q	DSQ	
Yury Rudzenok	S12	100m butterfly	1:06.31	10	did not advance	
Yury Rudzenok	SB12	100m breaststroke	1:15.45	8 Q	1:15.23	6
Dzmitry Salei	S13	100m butterfly	1:00.08	1 Q	58.89	1st place, gold medalist(s)
Dzmitry Salei	S13	50m freestyle	25.23	7 Q	24.92	5
Dzmitry Salei	S13	100m freestyle	55.12	4 Q	54.67	4
Dzmitry Salei	SM13	200m individual medley	2:24.57	9	did not advance	

==== Women ====
Athlete	Class	Event	Heats		Final	
Athlete	Class	Event	Result	Rank	Result	Rank
Natallia Shavel	S6	50m butterfly	48.72	14	did not advance	
Natallia Shavel	SB5	100m breaststroke	1:56.14	4 Q	1:57.69	6
Natallia Shavel	SM6	200m individual medley	3:40.74	9	did not advance	

=== Wheelchair fencing ===
==== Men ====
Athlete	Event	Qualification			Round of 16	Quarterfinal	Semifinal	Final / BM	
Athlete	Event	Opposition	Score	Rank	Opposition Score	Opposition Score	Opposition Score	Opposition Score	Rank
Mikalai Bezyazychny	Men's épée B	Shenkevych (UKR)	W 5–4	2 Q	Bogdos (GRE); W 15-7	Rodgers (USA); W 15–4	Cratere (FRA); W 15–6	Hu D (CHN); L 13–15	2nd place, silver medalist(s)
Mikalai Bezyazychny	Men's épée B	Kim G H (KOR)	W 5-3	2 Q	Bogdos (GRE); W 15-7	Rodgers (USA); W 15–4	Cratere (FRA); W 15–6	Hu D (CHN); L 13–15	2nd place, silver medalist(s)
Mikalai Bezyazychny	Men's épée B	Mari (ITA)	L 4-5	2 Q	Bogdos (GRE); W 15-7	Rodgers (USA); W 15–4	Cratere (FRA); W 15–6	Hu D (CHN); L 13–15	2nd place, silver medalist(s)
Mikalai Bezyazychny	Men's épée B	Ding (CHN)	W 5-4	2 Q	Bogdos (GRE); W 15-7	Rodgers (USA); W 15–4	Cratere (FRA); W 15–6	Hu D (CHN); L 13–15	2nd place, silver medalist(s)
Mikalai Bezyazychny	Men's épée B	Pluta (POL)	W 5-3	2 Q	Bogdos (GRE); W 15-7	Rodgers (USA); W 15–4	Cratere (FRA); W 15–6	Hu D (CHN); L 13–15	2nd place, silver medalist(s)
Mikalai Bezyazychny	Men's foil B	Sarri (ITA)	L 2-5	6	did not advance				
Mikalai Bezyazychny	Men's foil B	Latreche (FRA)	L 4-5	6	did not advance				
Mikalai Bezyazychny	Men's foil B	Wyganowski (POL)	L 2-5	6	did not advance				
Mikalai Bezyazychny	Men's foil B	Hisakawa (JPN)	L 4-5	6	did not advance				
Mikalai Bezyazychny	Men's foil B	Yusupov (RUS)	L 4-5	6	did not advance				

==== Women ====
Athlete	Event	Qualification			Round of 16	Quarterfinal	Semifinal	Final / BM	
Athlete	Event	Opposition	Score	Rank	Opposition Score	Opposition Score	Opposition Score	Opposition Score	Rank
Aliona Halkina	Women's épée A	Yu C Y (HKG)	L 1-5	4 Q	Zhang W (CHN); L 11-15	did not advance			
Aliona Halkina	Women's épée A	Juhasz (HUN)	L 3-5	4 Q	Zhang W (CHN); L 11-15	did not advance			
Aliona Halkina	Women's épée A	Witos-Eze (POL)	W 5-3	4 Q	Zhang W (CHN); L 11-15	did not advance			
Aliona Halkina	Women's épée A	Zhang W (CHN)	W 5-4	4 Q	Zhang W (CHN); L 11-15	did not advance			
Aliona Halkina	Women's épée A	Poignet (FRA)	L 4-5	4 Q	Zhang W (CHN); L 11-15	did not advance			
Aliona Halkina	Women's foil A	Zhang C (CHN)	L 2-5	5	did not advance				
Aliona Halkina	Women's foil A	Yu C Y (HKG)	L 3-5	5	did not advance				
Aliona Halkina	Women's foil A	Trigilia (ITA)	L 3-5	5	did not advance				
Aliona Halkina	Women's foil A	Picot (FRA)	L 2-5	5	did not advance				
Aliona Halkina	Women's foil A	Juhasz (HUN)	W 5-2	5	did not advance				

== See also ==
- Belarus at the Paralympics
- Belarus at the 2008 Summer Olympics
