= Ivan Kytsenko =

Ukrainian Paralympic athlete

Medal record

Paralympic athletics

Representing Ukraine

Paralympic Games
Silver medal – second place	2000 Sydney	Long Jump - F13
Silver medal – second place	2008 Beijing	Triple Jump - F12
Bronze medal – third place	2004 Athens	Long Jump - F12

Ivan Kytsenko is a Paralympian athlete from Ukraine competing mainly in category F12 long and triple jump events.

== Biography ==
Ivan has competed and medaled in three Paralympics starting in Sydney in 2000 where he won a silver in the F13 long jump but missed out on the pentathlon. Four years later in 2004 in Athens having been classified as F12 he missed out in the long jump but did pick up a bronze medal in the triple jump. In his third games in Beijing he won his third medal, a silver, in the F12 triple jump.
