= Anton Stabrovskyy =

Ukrainian Paralympic swimmer

Personal information
- Born: 12 September 1987 Lviv, Ukrainian SSR, Soviet Union
- Died: 18 December 2025 (aged 38) Hrekivka, Ukraine

Sport
- Sport: Swimming
- Club: Invasport, Lviv
Medal record
Swimming
Representing Ukraine
Paralympic Games
Bronze medal – third place	2008 Beijing	100 m butterfly S12
World Championships
Gold medal – first place	2006 Durban	4x100 m medley 49 pts
Bronze medal – third place	2006 Durban	100 m butterfly S12
Bronze medal – third place	2013 Montreal	100 m butterfly S12
IPC European Championships
Gold medal – first place	2009 Reykjavik	100 m butterfly S12
Silver medal – second place	2011 Berlin	100 m butterfly S12
Bronze medal – third place	2009 Reykjavik	400 m freestyle S12
Bronze medal – third place	2014 Eindhoven	100 m butterfly S12

Anton Stabrovskyy
- Антон Стабровський
- Military career
- Allegiance: Ukraine
- Branch: Armed Forces of Ukraine
- Unit: 3rd Assault Brigade
- Wars: Russo-Ukrainian War; Russian invasion of Ukraine; Luhansk Oblast campaign

Anton Stabrovskyy (Ukrainian: Антон Стабровський; 12 September 1987 – 18 December 2025) was a Ukrainian military officer and a Paralympic swimmer from Ukraine competing mainly in category S12 events.

Anton was part of the Ukrainian team for the 2008 Summer Paralympics in Beijing. He competed in the 200 metres (660 ft) individual medley and 400 metres (1,300 ft) freestyle finishing last in his heat in both events, he also finished third in the 100 metres (330 ft) butterfly to earn a bronze medal.

Anton served in the 3rd Assault Brigade since 2025. On December 18, 2025, during assault operations in the area of the village of Hrekivka (Luhansk direction), contact with Stabrovsky was lost. Since then, he has been considered missing, and on June 28, 2026, his death was confirmed.

== Personal life ==
Stabrovskyy was married with Maryna.
