= Athletics at the 2008 Summer Paralympics – Men's 400 metres T36 =

The men's 400m T36 had its final held on September 10 at 19:40.

== Medalists ==
Gold	Roman Pavlyk; Ukraine
Silver	Artem Arefyev; Russia
Bronze	Mian Che; China

== Results ==
Place	Athlete	Final
1	Roman Pavlyk (UKR)	54.13 WR
2	Artem Arefyev (RUS)	55.59
3	Mian Che (CHN)	55.70
4	Pavel Kharagezov (RUS)	57.51
5	Chengen He (CHN)	58.29
6	Wa Wai So (HKG)	58.44
7	Serhiy Sakovskyy (UKR)	59.00
8	Graeme Ballard (GBR)	59.22
	Aliaksandr Daniliuk (BLR)	DNF
