= Wheelchair fencing at the 2008 Summer Paralympics – Women's épée B =

Women's épée B at the XIII Paralympic Games
- Paralympic Wheelchair fencing
- Venue: Olympic Green Convention Center
- Dates: 16 September
- Competitors: 12 from 10 nations

Medalists
1st place, gold medalist(s)		Chan Yui Chong	Hong Kong
2nd place, silver medalist(s)		Yao Fang	China
3rd place, bronze medalist(s)		Saysunee Jana	Thailand

The women's épée B wheelchair fencing competition at the 2008 Summer Paralympics was held on 16 September at the Olympic Green Convention Center.

The competition began with a preliminary stage where fencers were divided into two pools and played a round robin tournament. In this stage, the winner of a bout was the first person to score five hits or the person with the highest score at the end of four minutes. Next was a knock-out stage, where fencers competed in three three-minute bouts with a one-minute break between each. The winner was the first to reach fifteen hits, or the one with the highest score at the end of the last bout. In the event of a tie, another one-minute bout was held, with the winner being the first to score a hit.

The event was won by Chan Yui Chong, representing Hong Kong.

== Results ==
=== Preliminaries ===
==== Pool A ====
Rank	Competitor	MP	W	L	Points	THA	HKG	CHN	HUN	UKR	ESP
1	Saysunee Jana (THA)	5	5	0	25:5	x	5:1	5:3	5:0	5:0	5:1
2	Chan Yui Chong (HKG)	5	4	1	21:13	1:5	x	5:1	5:4	5:3	5:0
3	Ye Hua (CHN)	5	3	2	19:20	3:5	1:5	x	5:3	5:4	5:3
4	Gyongyi Dani (HUN)	5	2	3	17:18	0:5	4:5	3:5	x	5:2	5:1
5	Iryna Lukianenko (UKR)	5	1	4	14:21	0:5	3:5	4:5	2:5	x	5:1
6	Gema Victoria Hassen Bey (ESP)	5	0	5	6:25	1:5	0:5	3:5	1:5	1:5	x

==== Pool B ====
Rank	Competitor	MP	W	L	Points	RUS	CHN	FRA	ITA	HUN	USA
1	Liudmila Vasilyeva (RUS)	5	5	0	25:12	x	5:4	5:3	5:1	5:3	5:1
2	Yao Fang (CHN)	5	4	1	24:11	4:5	x	5:2	5:1	5:3	5:0
3	Sylvie Magnat (FRA)	5	2	3	17:21	3:5	2:5	x	5:2	5:4	2:5
4	Rosalba Vettraino (ITA)	5	2	3	14:20	1:5	1:5	2:5	x	5:1	5:4
5	Judit Palfi (HUN)	5	1	4	16:23	3:5	3:5	4:5	1:5	x	5:3
6	Andrea Demello (USA)	5	1	4	13:22	1:5	0:5	5:2	4:5	3:5	x

=== Competition bracket ===
Round of 16
Rosalba Vettraino (ITA)	9
Judit Palfi (HUN)	15

Quarterfinals
Saysunee Jana (THA)	15
Judit Palfi (HUN)	4
Ye Hua (CHN)	10
Chan Yui Chong (HKG)	15
Yao Fang (CHN)	15
Gyongyi Dani (HUN)	12
Sylvie Magnat (FRA)	13
Liudmila Vasilyeva (RUS)	15

Semifinals
Saysunee Jana (THA)	8
Chan Yui Chong (HKG)	15
Yao Fang (CHN)	15
Liudmila Vasilyeva (RUS)	10

Final
Chan Yui Chong (HKG)	15
Yao Fang (CHN)	12
Third place
Saysunee Jana (THA)	15
Liudmila Vasilyeva (RUS)	8
