= Wheelchair fencing at the 2012 Summer Paralympics – Men's épée A =

Men's Épée A at the XIV Paralympic Games
- Venue: ExCeL Exhibition Centre
- Dates: 5 September 2012
- Competitors: 15 from 10 nations

Medalists
1st place, gold medalist(s)		Dariusz Pender	Poland
2nd place, silver medalist(s)		Romain Noble	France
3rd place, bronze medalist(s)		Matteo Betti	Italy

The men's épée category A fencing competition at the 2012 Summer Paralympics was held on 5 September 2012 at the ExCeL Exhibition Centre in London. This class was for athletes who had good trunk control and their fencing arm was not affected by their impairment.

== Schedule ==
All times are British Summer Time (UTC+1)

Date	Time	Round
5 September 2012	09:30	Qualification
5 September 2012	12:00	Round of 16
5 September 2012	14:30	Quarterfinals
5 September 2012	17:45	Semifinals
5 September 2012	18:30	Final

== Competition format ==
The tournament started with a group phase round-robin followed by a knockout stage. During a qualification round-robin, bouts last a maximum of three minutes, or until one athlete has scored five hits. There is then a knockout phase, in which bouts last a maximum of nine minutes (three periods of three minutes), or until one athlete has scored 15 hits.

== Results ==
=== Qualification ===
==== Group A ====
Athlete	B	V	V/B	HS	HD	China (CHN)	France (FRA)	Poland (POL)	Ukraine (UKR)	Hong Kong (HKG)
Tian Jianquan (CHN)	4	4	MAX	20	6	—	5–0	5–2	5–2	5–2
Robert Citerne (FRA)	4	3	0.75	15	6	0–5	—	5–3	5–2	5–1
Dariusz Pender (POL)	4	2	0.5	14	18	2–5	3–5	—	5–3	5–4
Vadym Tsedryk (UKR)	4	1	0.25	11	17	2–5	1–5	3–5	—	5–2
Wong Tang Tat (HKG)	4	0	0	10	20	2–5	2–5	4–5	2–5	—

==== Group B ====
Athlete	B	V	V/B	HS	HD	China (CHN)	France (FRA)	Poland (POL)	Hungary (HUN)	Belarus (BLR)
Duan Yanfei (CHN)	4	3	0.75	19	7	—	4–5	5–1	5–0	5–1
Romain Noble (FRA)	4	3	0.75	17	12	5–4	—	2–5	5–0	5–3
Radosław Stańczuk (POL)	4	2	0.5	13	14	0–5	3–5	—	5–2	5–2
Gyula Mató (HUN)	4	2	0.5	13	16	1–5	5–2	2–5	—	5–4
Martyn Kavalenia (BLR)	4	0	0	10	20	1–5	3–5	2–5	4–5	—

==== Group C ====
Athlete	B	V	V/B	HS	HD	Ukraine (UKR)	Russia (RUS)	Italy (ITA)	Hungary (HUN)	United States (USA)
Andrii Demchuk (UKR)	4	3	0.75	19	7	—	4–5	5–4	5–4	5–4
Artur Yusupov (RUS)	4	3	0.75	18	12	5–4	—	3–5	5–3	5–0
Matteo Betti (ITA)	4	3	0.75	17	12	5–3	4–5	—	5–4	5–0
Tamás Juhász (HUN)	4	1	0.25	16	17	3–5	4–5	4–5	—	5–2
Gary van der Wege (USA)	4	0	0	6	20	0–5	4–5	0–5	2–5	—

==== Finals ====
Round of 16
Dariusz Pender (POL)	15
Radosław Stańczuk (POL)	11
Romain Noble (FRA)	15
Gyula Mató (HUN)	9

Quarter-finals
Tian Jianquan (CHN)	8
Dariusz Pender (POL)	15
Robert Citerne (FRA)	10
Artur Yusupov (RUS)	15
Matteo Betti (ITA)	15
Andrii Demchuk (UKR)	11
Romain Noble (FRA)	15
Yanfei Duan (CHN)	11

Semi-finals
Dariusz Pender (POL)	15
Artur Yusupov (RUS)	14
Matteo Betti (ITA)	9
Romain Noble (FRA)	15

Final
Dariusz Pender (POL)	15
Romain Noble (FRA)	9
Third place match
Artur Yusupov (RUS)	10
Matteo Betti (ITA)	15

Source: London2012.com
