= Swimming at the 2008 Summer Paralympics – Men's 100 metre butterfly S12 =

Men's 100m Butterfly S12 at the XIII Paralympic Games
- Venue: Beijing National Aquatics Center
- Dates: 9 September
- Competitors: 13 from 8 nations
- Winning time: 56.90

Medalists
1st place, gold medalist(s)		Raman Makarau	Belarus
2nd place, silver medalist(s)		Sergei Punko	Belarus
3rd place, bronze medalist(s)		Anton Stabrovskyy	Ukraine

The men's 100m butterfly S12 event at the 2008 Summer Paralympics took place at the Beijing National Aquatics Center on 9 September. There were two heats; the swimmers with the eight fastest times advanced to the final.

== Results ==
=== Heats ===
Competed from 09:48.

==== Heat 1 ====
Rank	Name	Nationality	Time	Notes
1	Sergei Punko	Belarus	1:00.29	Q, PR
2	Anton Stabrovskyy	Ukraine	1:01.02	Q
3	Tucker Dupree	United States	1:02.14	Q
4	Sergii Klippert	Ukraine	1:02.45	Q
5	Yury Rudzenok	Belarus	1:06.31	
6	Pedro Gonzalez	Venezuela	1:12.80	

==== Heat 2 ====
Rank	Name	Nationality	Time	Notes
1	Raman Makarau	Belarus	59.08	Q, PR
2	Sergiy Demchuk	Ukraine	1:02.24	Q
3	Israel Oliver	Spain	1:02.86	Q
4	Albert Gelis	Spain	1:03.70	Q
5	Alexander Pikalov	Russia	1:04.47	
6	Kitipong Sriboonrueng	Thailand	1:13.17	
7	Miguel Otero	Colombia	1:16.99	

=== Final ===
Competed at 18:05.

Rank	Name	Nationality	Time	Notes
1st place, gold medalist(s)	Raman Makarau	Belarus	56.90	WR
2nd place, silver medalist(s)	Sergei Punko	Belarus	59.72	
3rd place, bronze medalist(s)	Anton Stabrovskyy	Ukraine	1:00.50	
4	Sergii Klippert	Ukraine	1:00.72	
5	Tucker Dupree	United States	1:01.53	
6	Sergiy Demchuk	Ukraine	1:02.29	
7	Israel Oliver	Spain	1:03.10	
8	Albert Gelis	Spain	1:03.69	

Q = qualified for final. WR = World Record. PR = Paralympic Record.
