= Athletics at the 2008 Summer Paralympics – Men's triple jump F12 =

The Men's Triple Jump F12 had its Final held on September 8 at 9:40.

== Medalists ==
Gold	Osamah Alshanqiti; Saudi Arabia
Silver	Ivan Kytsenko; Ukraine
Bronze	Vladimir Zayets; Azerbaijan

== Results ==
Place	Athlete	1	2	3	4	5	6	Best
1	Osamah Alshanqiti (KSA)	14.33	14.79	14.49	14.74	15.05	15.37	15.37
2	Ivan Kytsenko (UKR)	14.95	14.46	15.09	15.06	15.08	15.24	15.24
3	Vladimir Zayets (AZE)	14.65	14.93	15.00	14.46	14.10	x	15.00
4	Aliaksandr Kouzmichou (BLR)	x	13.07	13.73	x	13.92	14.28	14.28
5	Ruslan Sivitski (BLR)	13.91	13.84	13.58	13.69	x	13.77	13.91
6	Siarhei Burdukou (BLR)	12.63	13.30	13.11	12.79	x	-	13.30
7	Evgeny Kegelev (RUS)	x	12.97	x	12.65	x	x	12.97
