= Athletics at the 2008 Summer Paralympics – Men's 100 metres T36 =

The Men's 100m T36 had its Final held on September 9 at 10:15.

== Medalists ==
Gold	Roman Pavlyk; Ukraine
Silver	Ben Rushgrove; Great Britain
Bronze	So Wa Wai; Hong Kong

== Results ==
Place	Athlete	Final
1	Roman Pavlyk (UKR)	12.25 PR
2	Ben Rushgrove (GBR)	12.35
3	So Wa Wai (HKG)	12.38
4	Xu Ran (CHN)	12.40
5	Marcin Mielczarek (POL)	12.42
6	Mian Che (CHN)	12.46
7	Mohd Raduan Emeari (MAS)	12.64
8	Graeme Ballard (GBR)	12.65
9	Aliaksandr Daniliuk (BLR)	12.83
