= Ben Rushgrove =

British sprinter (born 1988)

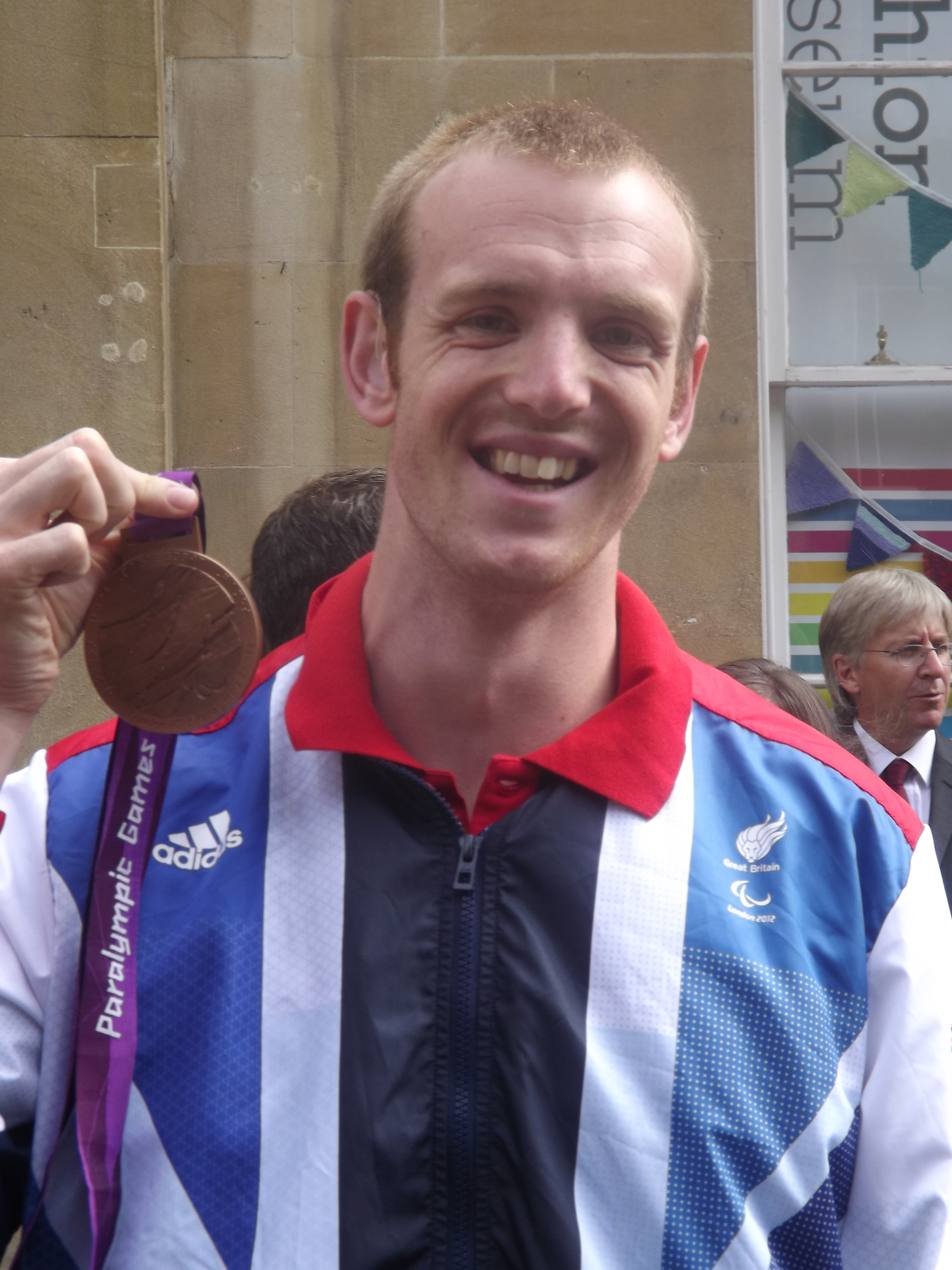
- Rushgrove in his home City of Bath with his 2012 Paralympic Bronze Medal

Personal information
- Nationality: British
- Born: 23 February 1988 (age 38)

Sport
- Country: Great Britain
- Sport: Athletics

Achievements and titles
- Paralympic finals: 2008, 2012
Medal record
Men's paralympic athletics
Representing Great Britain
Paralympic Games
Silver medal – second place	2008 Beijing	100 m T36
Bronze medal – third place	2012 London	200 m T36
IPC World Championships
Silver medal – second place	2011 Christchurch	100 m T36
Bronze medal – third place	2011 Christchurch	200 m T36
IPC European Championships
Bronze medal – third place	2012 Stadskanaal	200 m T36

Benjamin David "Ben" Rushgrove (born 23 February 1988 in Bath) is a British sprint runner with cerebral palsy and hearing impairment. He runs in the T36 classification, and set a world record for the T36 200m at the 2007 Visa Paralympic World Cup, becoming the first athlete to achieve under 25 seconds in the event.

He represented Great Britain in the T36 100m and 200m at the 2008 Summer Paralympics. Ben won a silver medal in the T36 100m at the Paralympic Games in Beijing 2008 in a time of 12.35 seconds. He was forced to withdraw from the 200 m event due to a foot injury. He is also involved in training Future Paralympic hopefuls at P2P Days in Bath. At the 2012 Summer Paralympics held in London, Rushgrove won the bronze medal in the T36 Men's 200 m
