= Athletics at the 2008 Summer Paralympics – Men's 200 metres T36 =

The Men's 200m T36 had its Final held on September 15 at 17:42.

== Medalists ==
Gold	Wa Wai So; Hong Kong
Silver	Roman Pavlyk; Ukraine
Bronze	Mian Che; China

== Results ==
Place	Athlete	Final
1	Wa Wai So (HKG)	24.65 WR
2	Roman Pavlyk (UKR)	25.05
3	Mian Che (CHN)	25.34
4	Marcin Mielczarek (POL)	25.46
5	Xu Ran (CHN)	25.54
6	Graeme Ballard (GBR)	25.69
7	Aliaksadr Daniliuk (BLR)	26.61
8	Mohamed Boulesnam (ALG)	27.55
