= Swimming at the 2008 Summer Paralympics – Women's 100 metre breaststroke SB5 =

Women's 100m Breaststroke SB5 at the XIII Paralympic Games
- Venue: Beijing National Aquatics Center
- Dates: 12 September
- Competitors: 12 from 10 nations
- Winning time: 1:36.92

Medalists
1st place, gold medalist(s)		Kirsten Bruhn	Germany
2nd place, silver medalist(s)		Rachel Lardière	France
3rd place, bronze medalist(s)		Gitta Ráczkó	Hungary

The women's 100m breaststroke SB5 event at the 2008 Summer Paralympics took place at the Beijing National Aquatics Center on 12 September. There were two heats; the swimmers with the eight fastest times advanced to the final.

== Results ==
=== Heats ===
Competed from 10:25.

==== Heat 1 ====
Rank	Name	Nationality	Time	Notes
1	Florence Lancial	France	1:54.99	Q
2	Natallia Shavel	Belarus	1:56.14	Q
3	Nyree Lewis	Great Britain	2:00.45	Q
4	Yuri Kitamura	Japan	2:02.68	Q
5	Hannah May Clarke	Ireland	2:06.33	
6	Julia Castelló	Spain	2:10.71	

==== Heat 2 ====
Rank	Name	Nationality	Time	Notes
1	Kirsten Bruhn	Germany	1:36.30	Q, WR
2	Rachel Lardière	France	1:53.90	Q
3	Gitta Ráczkó	Hungary	1:56.88	Q
4	Fanni Illes	Hungary	2:06.29	Q
5	Kateryna Demyanenko	Ukraine	2:07.10	
6	Choi Na Mi	South Korea	2:10.96	

=== Final ===
Competed at 18:48.

Rank	Name	Nationality	Time	Notes
1st place, gold medalist(s)	Kirsten Bruhn	Germany	1:36.92	
2nd place, silver medalist(s)	Rachel Lardière	France	1:52.34	
3rd place, bronze medalist(s)	Gitta Ráczkó	Hungary	1:54.49	
4	Nyree Lewis	Great Britain	1:56.19	
5	Florence Lancial	France	1:56.73	
6	Natallia Shavel	Belarus	1:57.69	
7	Yuri Kitamura	Japan	2:03.41	
8	Fanni Illes	Hungary	2:07.52	

Q = qualified for final. WR = World Record.
