= Rachel Lardière =

French Paralympic swimmer

Personal information
- Born: 28 June 1970 (age 56) Sainte-Colombe, Rhône, France

Sport
- Country: France
- Sport: Paralympic swimming
- Disability: Paraplegia
- Disability class: S7, SB5, SM6
- Event: Breaststroke
- Club: AS Handivienne, Vienne
- Coached by: Yann Eric Fouille
Medal record
Paralympic swimming
Representing France
Paralympic Games
Silver medal – second place	2008 Beijing	Women's 100m breaststroke SB5
World Championships
Bronze medal – third place	2010 Eindhoven	Women's 100m breaststroke SB5

Rachel Lardière (born 28 June 1970) is a French Paralympic swimmer who specialises in breaststroke at international level events. She previously practised judo, handball and artistic gymnastics before her accident.

Lardière became an incomplete paraplegic in February 1988 following an accident with a pommel horse during a gymnastics training session. She has been using a wheelchair since the accident.
