= Helene Raynsford =

British Paralympic rower

Medal record

Representing Great Britain

Paralympic rowing

Summer Paralympic Games
Gold medal – first place	2008 Beijing	Women's single sculls

Helene Raynsford (born 1979) is a British rower who competed at the 2008 Summer Paralympics.

She trained at Elmhurst Ballet School before an injury ended her chances of becoming a professional dancer. At university Raynsford studied biochemistry but a head injury at the age of 21 left her needing the use of a wheelchair. Helene completed a degree at Royal Holloway and is now undertaking a masters in neuroscience. She has returned to Royal Holloway as a guest speaker. Before taking up rowing Helene was a member of the Great Britain wheelchair basketball team from 2003 until 2006 and won two Paralympic Cup silver medals in the sport.

== Rowing ==
Raynsford took up rowing after visiting Dorney Lake in 2005, before going on to join Guildford Rowing Club, where much of her early training was undertaken. She first competed in the national championships in 2005. In May 2006 she posted a qualifying time that earned her entry to the World Championships but her preparations were disrupted by a car accident that left her ribs and stomach badly bruised. Despite this she went on to win her heat and then the final to become world champion in the arms-only single sculls. At the 2007 World Championships she suffered an asthma attack on the first day of the competition and finished fifth in the final. This qualified her for the 2008 Paralympics.

At the 2008 Paralympic Games in Beijing, China, rowing made its debut appearance at the Games. Raynsford became the first ever Paralympic champion in the sport, winning the women's single sculls by a 12-second margin in a time of 6 minutes 12.93 seconds.

In April 2010 Raynsford announced her retirement from rowing due to a cardiac problem. Following a change in her drug regime and surgery she returned to the sport and after winning the British trials was named to the British team for the 2010 World Championships in New Zealand.

Raynsford was appointed to UK Anti-Doping's newly formed Athlete's Committee along with Paralympic swimmer Graham Edmunds, football player Clarke Carlisle and former England rugby union captain, Martin Corry.
