= Laurent François =

French wheelchair fencer

Personal information
- Born: 6 May 1968 (age 58) Clermont Ferrand, France

Sport
- Country: France
- Sport: Wheelchair fencing
Medal record
Wheelchair fencing
Representing France
Paralympic Games
| Gold medal – first place | 2008 Beijing | Individual foil B |
| Silver medal – second place | 2008 Beijing | Individual sabre B |
World IWAS Championships
| Gold medal – first place | 2010 Paris | Individual sabre B |
| Gold medal – first place | 2010 Paris | Team sabre |
| Bronze medal – third place | 2010 Paris | Individual foil B |
| Bronze medal – third place | 2010 Paris | Team foil |
European IWAS Championships
| Gold medal – first place | 2007 Warsaw | Team sabre |
| Gold medal – first place | 2011 Sheffield | Team sabre |
| Silver medal – second place | 2007 Warsaw | Individual sabre B |
| Silver medal – second place | 2011 Sheffield | Individual foil B |
| Bronze medal – third place | 2005 Madrid | Individual foil B |
| Bronze medal – third place | 2005 Madrid | Team sabre |
| Bronze medal – third place | 2011 Sheffield | Team foil |

Laurent François (born 6 May 1968) is a French retired wheelchair fencer who competed at international fencing competitions. He was a Paralympic champion in the foil. He is also a double World champion and double European champion in the sabre.
