= Carlos Soler Márquez =

Spanish wheelchair fencer

Carlos Soler
Personal information
- Full name: Carlos Soler Márquez
- Nationality: Spanish
- Born: 16 February 1972 (age 54) Málaga, Spain

Sport
- Country: Spain
- Sport: Wheelchair fencing

Carlos Soler Márquez (Spanish pronunciation: [ˈkaɾlos soˈleɾ ˈmaɾkeθ], born 16 February 1972) is a Spanish wheelchair fencer who has represented Spain at five Paralympic Games. Following the 2012 Games, he retired from the sport. He is also a fencing administrator and coach, having organized a World Cup event at the fencing club where he is president.

== Personal ==
Soler was born on 16 February 1972 in Málaga. While serving in the military, he had an accident involving a thirteen-meter fall that resulted in him becoming a paraplegic.

== Wheelchair fencing ==
Soler is classified as a Category B competitor. In 1992, he met Paquita Bazalo, a Spanish Paralympic medalists in the sport who had competed at the 1992 Summer Paralympics. Bazalo invited him to a competition being held locally. Attending the event caused him to take up the sport in 1993 at the Garden City Fencing Club where he was coached by Antonio Marzal. At the time, Marzal had been the national team coach since starting in 1991. At the time, there were four wheelchair fencers already at the club.

Throughout his career, Soler has accumulated a second place at the European Championships, 9 Spanish championships and 5 Paralympic Games appearances. He has been a Plan ADOP scholarship holder. Because of the amount of luggage he has to take in order to compete that needs to be checked, including a wheelchair and a bag with his fencing foils, not all of it arrives on the same plane. As a result, he has had to borrow equipment from his teammates to compete. Because of his personality, he has tried to avoid team events and only compete in individual events because then you are only responsible for yourself and not others.

Soler competed at the 1995 European Championships. He competed at the 1996 Summer Paralympics. He competed at the 1997 European Championships. He competed at the 1998 World Championships. He competed at the 1999 European Championships. In 2002, he competed at the World Championships. He competed at the 2003 European Championships. He competed at a 2003 World Cup event held in Spain. He competed at the 2004 Summer Paralympics. He competed at the 2007 European Championships, and had a first-place finish in one event. He won the 2008 Spanish national championships, getting gold in two different events. He competed at the 2008 Summer Paralympics. He did well during the 2010/2011 fencing season. At the 2011 Italian hosted Wheelchair Fencing World Championships, he was one of three competitors representing Spain, all of whom were male. He competed in the saber and épée events.

By 2012, Sole was the president of the Garden City Fencing Club. In 2012, he organized a World Cup event in Málaga. He qualified for the event at one of the last available opportunities at an event in early 2012 in Berlin, Germany. He left for London from Madrid in late August. Going to London, he was sponsored by the city of Málaga and local companies from the area including Poyatos Orthopedics. He competed at the 2012 Summer Paralympics, where he was Spain's only wheelchair fencing representative.

Soler retired from the sport as an active competitor in 2013 when he was 41 years old. He was a 2013 La Fundación Andalucía Olímpica scholarship holder. In December 2013, he marked a day to recognize people with disabilities by attending an event at a school in Cottenlengo to tell them about Paralympic sport in Spain and show them what people in wheelchairs can do. In 2013, he was beginning to pass the torch to the next generation of Spanish wheelchair fencers, and was assisting Lorenzo Ribes in trying to get qualified for the 2016 Summer Paralympics. Ribes has tried to encourage him to stay in the sport as a competitor.

While Spain invented the sport, from the start of Soler' competitive career to the end of it, the level of overall support for fencing in Spain has declined, meaning there have been fewer opportunities for support, places to compete, sports scholarships and sponsorship opportunities. This is something that has concerned Soler as he has moved into coaching.
