= Ye Ruyi =

Chinese wheelchair fencer

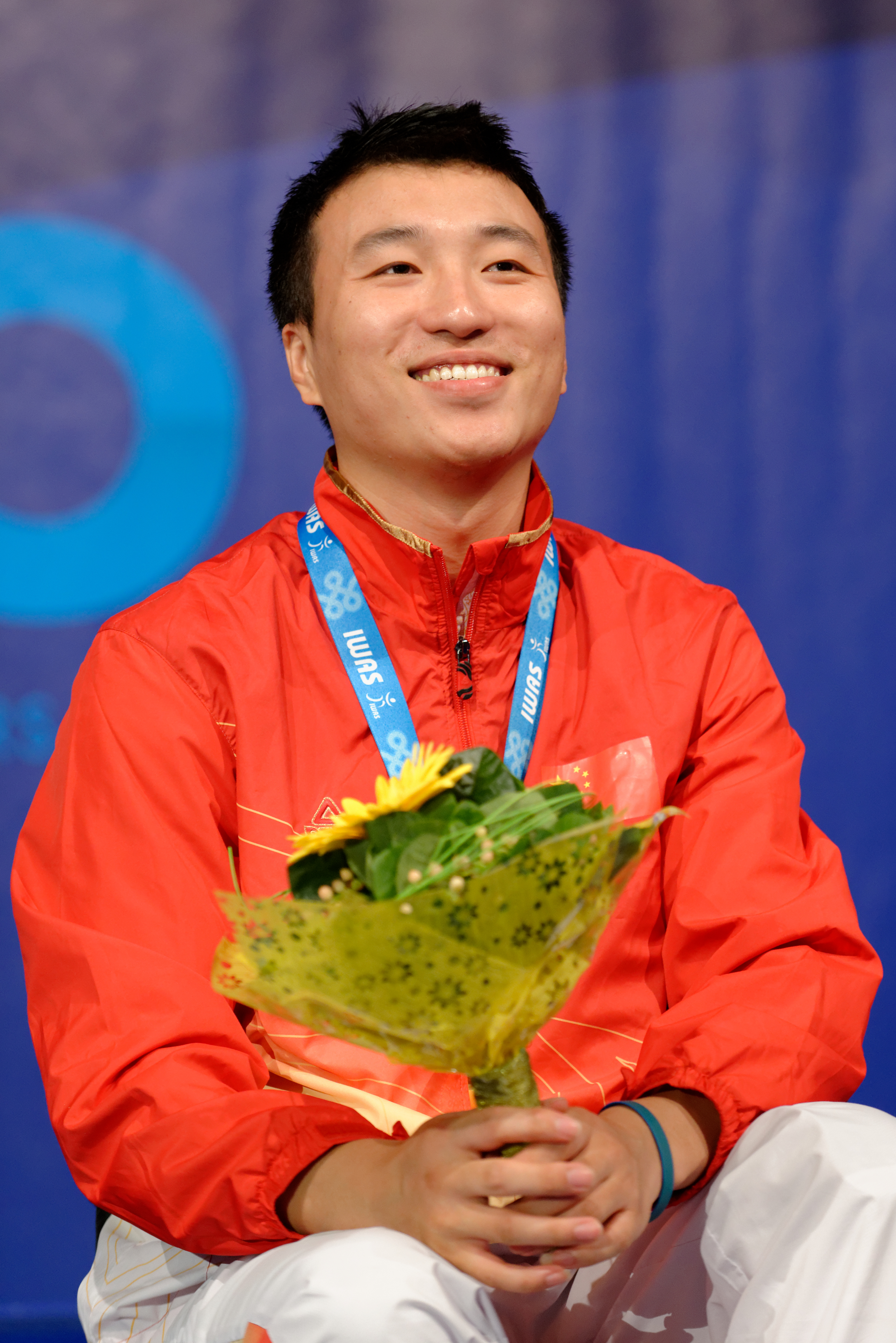
- Ye Ruyi (2013)

Personal information
- Born: 26 May 1987 (age 39) Beijing, China

Sport
- Country: China
- Sport: Wheelchair fencing
Medal record
Paralympic Games
Gold medal – first place	2008 Beijing	Foil A
Gold medal – first place	2008 Beijing	Sabre A
Gold medal – first place	2012 London	Foil A
Gold medal – first place	2012 London	Team foil
Gold medal – first place	2016 Rio de Janeiro	Foil A
Gold medal – first place	2016 Rio de Janeiro	Team foil
Asian Para Games
Gold medal – first place	2010 Guangzhou	Team foil
Gold medal – first place	2014 Incheon	Sabre A
Gold medal – first place	2014 Incheon	Team foil
Silver medal – second place	2010 Guangzhou	Foil A
Silver medal – second place	2014 Incheon	Foil A

Ye Ruyi (born 26 May 1987) is a Chinese wheelchair fencer. He represented China at the Summer Paralympics in 2008, 2012 and 2016 and, in total, he won six gold medals at the Summer Paralympics.
