= Kuwait at the 2008 Summer Paralympics =

- IPC code: KUW
- NPC: Kuwait Paralympic Committee

in Beijing
- Competitors: 8 in 3 sports
- Flag bearers: Hamad Aladwani (opening & closing)
- Medals Ranked -th: Gold 0 Silver 0 Bronze 0 Total 0

Summer Paralympics appearances (overview)
- 1980; 1984; 1988; 1992; 1996; 2000; 2004; 2008; 2012; 2016; 2020; 2024

Kuwait sent a delegation to compete at the 2008 Summer Paralympics in Beijing, People's Republic of China. According to official records, eight athletes competed in athletics, powerlifting and wheelchair fencing.

== Athletics ==
3 competitors:

Men

| Athlete | Class | Event | Heats | | Semifinal | | Final | | |
| Athlete | Class | Event | Result | Rank | Result | Rank | Result | Points | Rank |
|---|---|---|---|---|---|---|---|---|---|
| Hamad Aladwani | T53 | 100 m | 15.75 | 5 q | N/A | | 15.36 | - | 7 |
| Hamad Aladwani | T53 | 200 m | 27.74 | 5 q | N/A | | 27.67 | - | 6 |
| Hamad Aladwani | T53 | 400 m | 52.84 | 3 q | N/A | | 51.03 | - | 7 |
| Adel Alrashidi | F33-34/52 (F34) | Shot put | N/A | | | | 8.51 | 789 | 16 |
| Adel Alrashidi | F33-34/52 (F34) | Javelin throw | N/A | | | | 22.89 | 858 | 9 |

Women

| Athlete | Class | Event | Heats | | Semifinal | | Final | | |
| Athlete | Class | Event | Result | Rank | Result | Rank | Result | Points | Rank |
|---|---|---|---|---|---|---|---|---|---|
| Maha Alsheraian | F32-34/52-53 (F32) | Shot put | N/A | | | | 4.67 | 918 | 9 |
| Maha Alsheraian | F32-34/51-53 (F32) | Discus throw | N/A | | | | 9.63 | 868 | 11 |

== Powerlifting ==
1 competitor:

Men

| Athlete | Class | Event | Result | Rank |
|---|---|---|---|---|
| Mohammad Alkhalifah | - | -56 kg | 130.0 | 14 |

== Wheelchair Fencing ==
4 competitors:

Men

| Athlete | Class | Event | Preliminary Pool Stage | | | | | | | 1/8 Finals | Quarterfinals | Semifinals | Final/ Bronze medal match |
| Athlete | Class | Event | Bout 1 | Bout 2 | Bout 3 | Bout 4 | Bout 5 | Bout 6 | Rank | 1/8 Finals | Quarterfinals | Semifinals | Final/ Bronze medal match |
| Athlete | Class | Event | Opposition Result | Opposition Result | Opposition Result | Opposition Result | Opposition Result | Opposition Result | Rank | Opposition Result | Opposition Result | Opposition Result | Opposition Result |
|---|---|---|---|---|---|---|---|---|---|---|---|---|---|
| Abdullah Alhaddad | Cat. A | Foil | Pender (POL); L 3-5 | Maillard (FRA); L 1-5 | Mato (HUN); L 1-5 | Pellegrini (ITA); L 4-5 | Andreev (RUS); W 5-2 | N/A | 5 Q | Pender (POL); L 6-15 | did not advance | | |
| Abdullah Alhaddad | Cat. A | Épée | Pylarinos (GRE); W 5-3 | Davydenko (UKR); L 1-5 | Serafini (ITA); W 5-1 | Maillard (FRA); L 4-5 | Saengsawang (THA); W 5-4 | Sanchez (ESP); W 5-0 | 3 Q | Saengsawang (THA); L 9-15 | did not advance | | |
| Tariq Alqallaf | Cat. A | Foil | Saengsawang (THA); W 5-1 | Zhang (CHN); L 0-5 | Betti (ITA); L 0-5 | Horvath (HUN); W 5-4 | Granell (ESP); W 5-0 | Andree (GER); W 5-1 | 3 Q | Bazhukov (UKR); W 15-9 | Ye (CHN); L 6-15 | did not advance | |
| Tariq Alqallaf | Cat. A | Épée | Horvath (HUN); W 5-1 | Stanczuk (POL); W 5-3 | Wong (HKG); L 3-5 | Tian (CHN); L 0-5 | Betti (ITA); L 0-5 | N/A | 5 Q | Maillard (FRA); L 7-15 | did not advance | | |
| Abdulwahab Alsaedi | Cat. B | Foil | Fawcett (GBR); W 5-2 | Francois (FRA); L 3-5 | Rodgers (USA); L 4-5 | Datsko (UKR); L 4-5 | Czop (POL); L 2-5 | N/A | 5 Q | Hui (HKG); L 3-15 | did not advance | | |
| Abdulwahab Alsaedi | Cat. B | Épée | Williams (USA); L 4-5 | Bogdos (GRE); L 4-5 | Poleshchuk (RUS); L 1-5 | Latreche (FRA); L 2-5 | Komar (UKR); L 2-5 | N/A | 6 | did not advance | | | |
| Ahmad Altabbakh | Cat. A | Sabre | Pellegrini (ITA); L 1-5 | Calhoun (USA); L 4-5 | Makowski (POL); L 3-5 | Frolov (RUS); L 4-5 | Sanchez (ESP); L 2-5 | More (FRA); L 3-5 | 7 | did not advance | | | |

== See also ==
- Kuwait at the Paralympics
- Kuwait at the 2008 Summer Olympics
