= Matteo Betti =

Italian wheelchair fencer (born 1985)

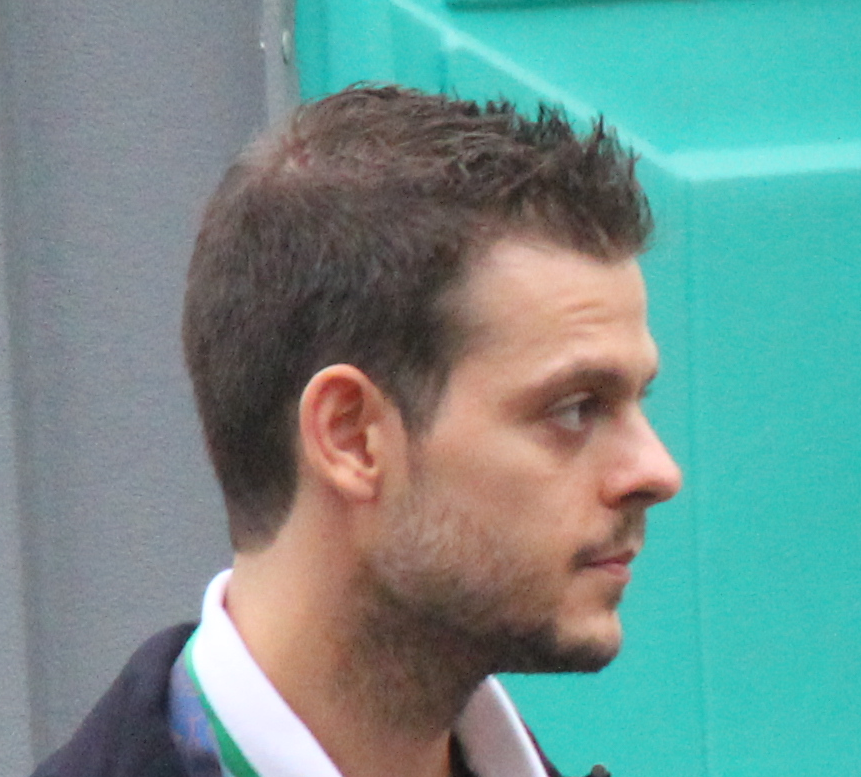

Personal information
- Born: 26 November 1985 (age 40) Siena, Italy

Sport
- Country: Italy
- Sport: Wheelchair fencing
- Team: Fiamme Azzurre
Medal record
Men's wheelchair fencing
Representing Italy
Paralympic Games
Silver medal – second place	2024 Paris	Foil A
Bronze medal – third place	2012 London	Épée A

Matteo Betti (born 26 November 1985) is an Italian wheelchair fencer. Born in Siena, he represented Italy at the 2008 Summer Paralympics, at the 2012 Summer Paralympics and at the 2016 Summer Paralympics and he won the bronze medal in the men's épée A event in 2012.
