= Pál Szekeres =

Hungarian fencer (born 1964)

Pál Szekeres MEP
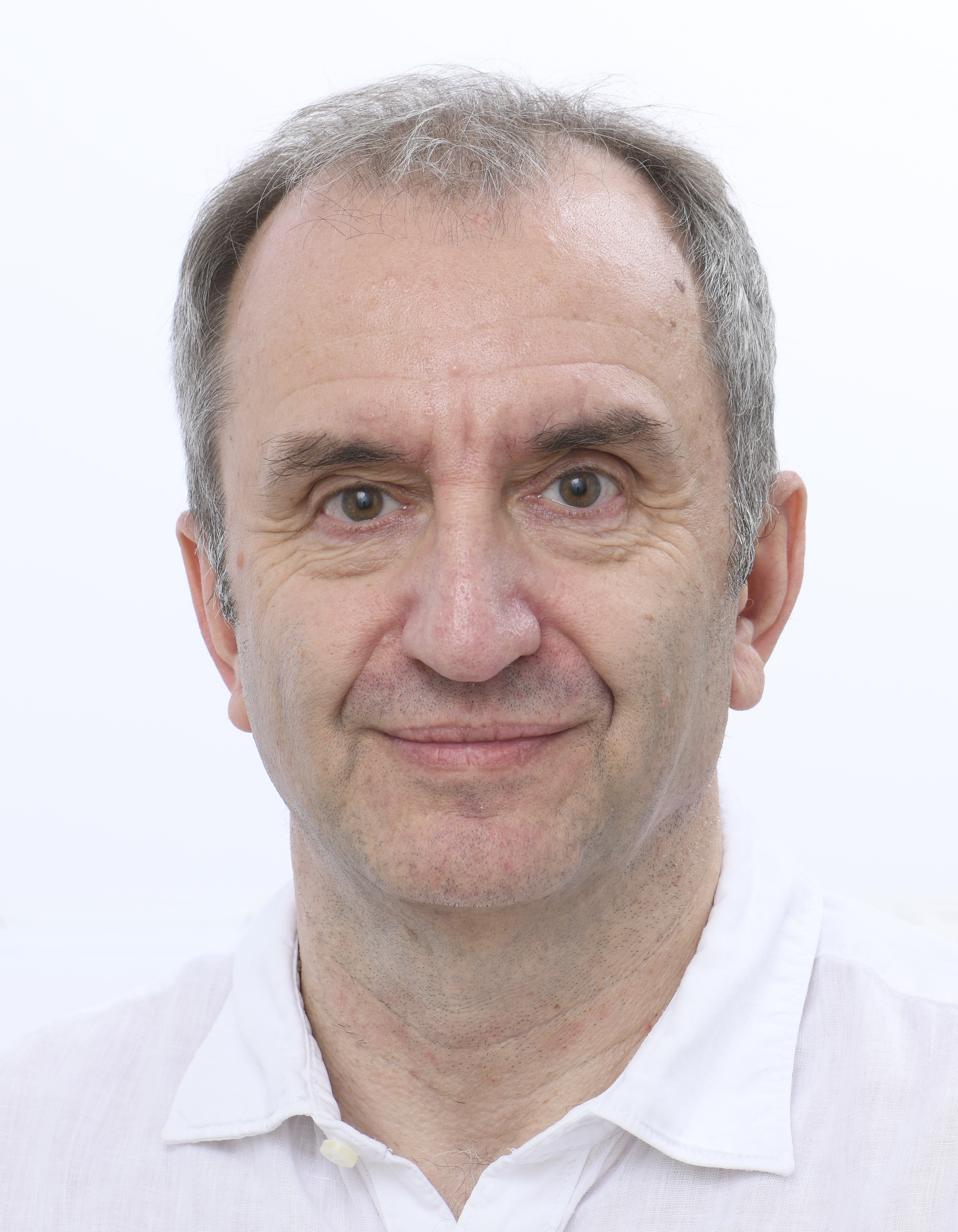

Personal information
- Born: 22 September 1964 (age 61) Budapest, Hungary

Sport
- Sport: Fencing
- Club: Újpesti TE
Medal record
Men's fencing
Representing Hungary
Olympic Games
Bronze medal – third place	1988 Seoul	Team foil
Paralympic Games
Gold medal – first place	1992 Barcelona	Individual foil 2
Gold medal – first place	1996 Atlanta	Individual foil B
Gold medal – first place	1996 Atlanta	Individual sabre B
Bronze medal – third place	2000 Sydney	Individual foil B
Bronze medal – third place	2004 Athens	Individual sabre B
Bronze medal – third place	2008 Beijing	Individual foil B
Summer Universiade
Gold medal – first place	1985 Kobe	Team foil
Silver medal – second place	1989 Duisburg	Team foil
Bronze medal – third place	1987 Zagreb	Individual foil

Pál Szekeres (born 22 September 1964) is a retired Hungarian foil and sabre fencer. He has the distinction of being the first person to have won medals at both the Olympic and Paralympic Games.

== Career in sport ==
Szekeres represented Hungary at the 1988 Summer Olympics in Seoul, and won a bronze medal in the team foil event.

In 1991, he was injured in a bus accident, and used a wheelchair. He then took to wheelchair fencing. Described as "the most successful Paralympic athlete in Hungary", he won a gold medal in foil at the 1992 Summer Paralympics in Barcelona, two gold at the 1996 Games in Atlanta, a bronze in 2000, 2004, and 2008. Outside the Paralympic Games, Szekeres participated in the Wheelchair Fencing World Cup in 2006, winning a bronze medal in the individual sabre event. He has also been European Champion, notably winning gold in the individual sabre event at the European Championships in 2007. In 2008 he was ranked third in the world.

== Career in government and administration ==
From 1999 to 2005, Szekeres was deputy state secretary within the Ministry of Children, Youth and Sports. He was also Ministerial Commissioner and Senior Programme Officer tasked with a government programme to provide "equal opportunity through sport for people living with disabilities". From 1996 to 2000, he was a member of the Presidency of the International Wheelchair Fencing Committee. From 2001 to 2005, he was "member at large" of the European Paralympic Committee, working in administration. In 2005, he became President of the Hungarian Sports Federation for the Disabled. As of 2005, Szekeres was a member of the Executive Committee of the National Paralympic Committee of Hungary, and was participating in the organising of the International Paralympic Sport Film Festival.

Szekeres has a university degree in physical education as a coach, and also holds a degree in marketing communication.

== See also ==
- List of athletes who have competed in the Paralympics and Olympics
