= Loredana Trigilia =

Italian wheelchair fencer

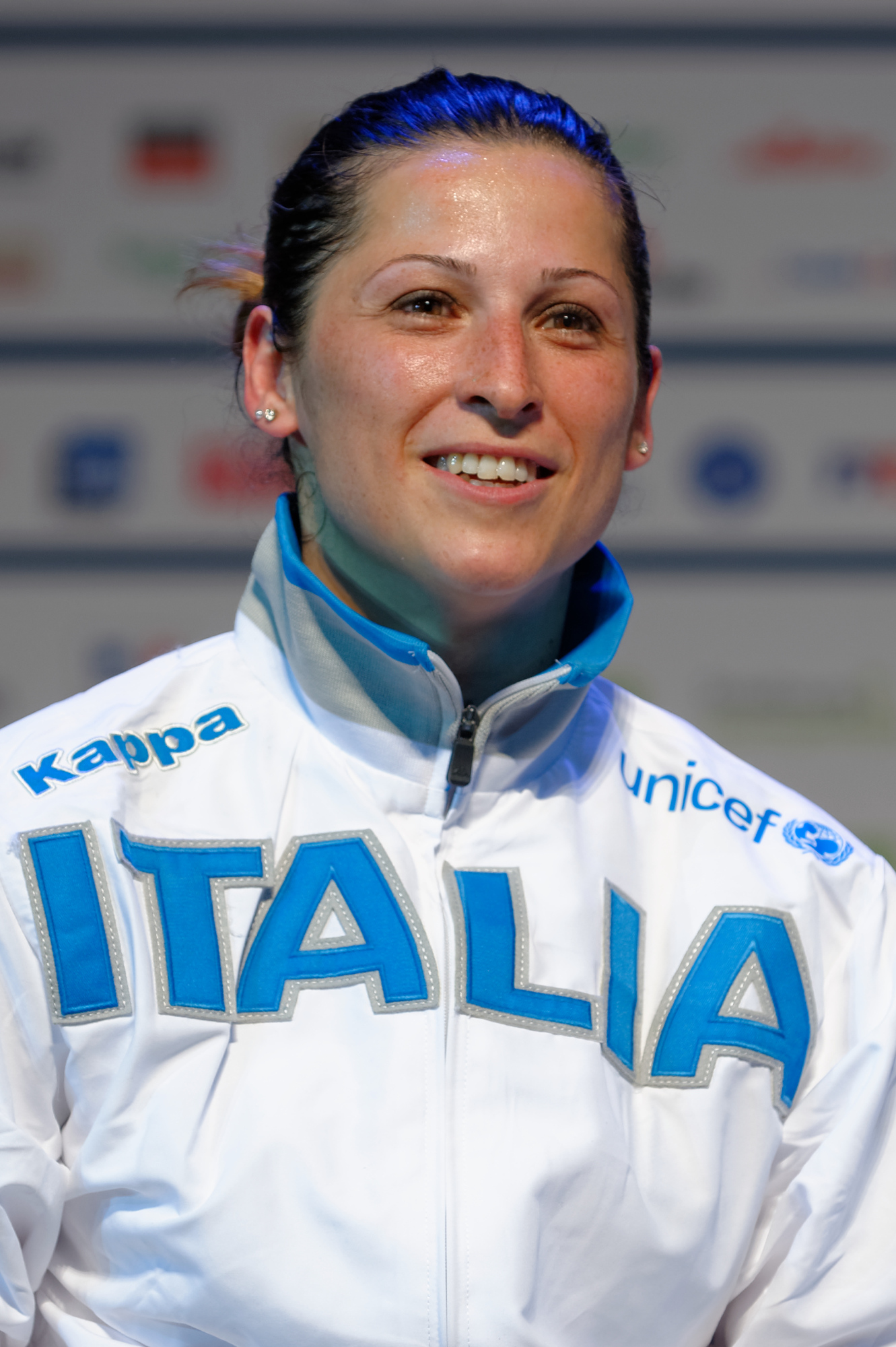
- Trigilia in 2014.

Personal information
- Born: 25 January 1976 (age 50) Syracuse, Sicily, Italy

Sport
- Country: Italy
- Sport: Wheelchair fencing
Medal record
Event	1st	2nd	3rd
Paralympic Games	0	1	2
World Championships	1	2	4
European Championships	2	4	2
Total	3	7	8

Loredana Trigilia (born 25 January 1976) is an Italian wheelchair fencer. She competed at the 2016 Summer Paralympics, winning a bronze medal in Women's team foil, and at the 2020 Summer Paralympics, winning a silver medal in Women's foil team.

== Career ==
She competed at six editions of Summer Paralympics from Sydney 2000 to Tokyo 2020.

In addition at the two Paralympic medals, Trigilia also won seven world championships medals and eight European championships medals.

== Achievements ==
Year	Competition	Venue	Rank	Event
2000	Summer Paralympics	(Australia) Sydney	5th	Foil individual A
2000	Summer Paralympics	(Australia) Sydney	5th	Foil team
2000	Summer Paralympics	(Australia) Sydney	9th	Épée individual A
2000	Summer Paralympics	(Australia) Sydney	5th	Épée team
2004	Summer Paralympics	(Greece) Athens	5th	Foil individual A
2004	Summer Paralympics	(Greece) Athens	5th	Foil team
2004	Summer Paralympics	(Greece) Athens	4th	Épée individual A
2004	Summer Paralympics	(Greece) Athens	6th	Épée team
2008	Summer Paralympics	(China) Beijing	5th	Foil individual A
2008	Summer Paralympics	(China) Beijing	11th	Épée individual A
2012	Summer Paralympics	(United Kingdom) London	11th	Foil individual A
2016	Summer Paralympics	(Brazil) Rio de Janeiro	10th	Foil individual A
2016	Summer Paralympics	(Brazil) Rio de Janeiro	3rd	Foil team
2021	Summer Paralympics	(Japan) Tokyo	10th	Sabre individual A
2021	Summer Paralympics	(Japan) Tokyo	9th	Foil individual A
2021	Summer Paralympics	(Japan) Tokyo	2nd	Foil team
