= Alberto Pellegrini =

Italian Paralympic fencer (born 1970)

Personal information
- Full name: Andrea Alberto Pellegrini
- Born: 22 December 1970 (age 55) Civitavecchia, Italy

Sport
- Country: Italy
- Sport: Wheelchair fencing
Medal record
Event	1st	2nd	3rd
Paralympic Games	1	4	4

Alberto Pellegrini (born 22 December 1970) is a former Italian paralympic fencer who won six medals at the Summer Paralympics.
