= Swimming at the 2008 Summer Paralympics =

Swimming at the XIII Paralympic Games
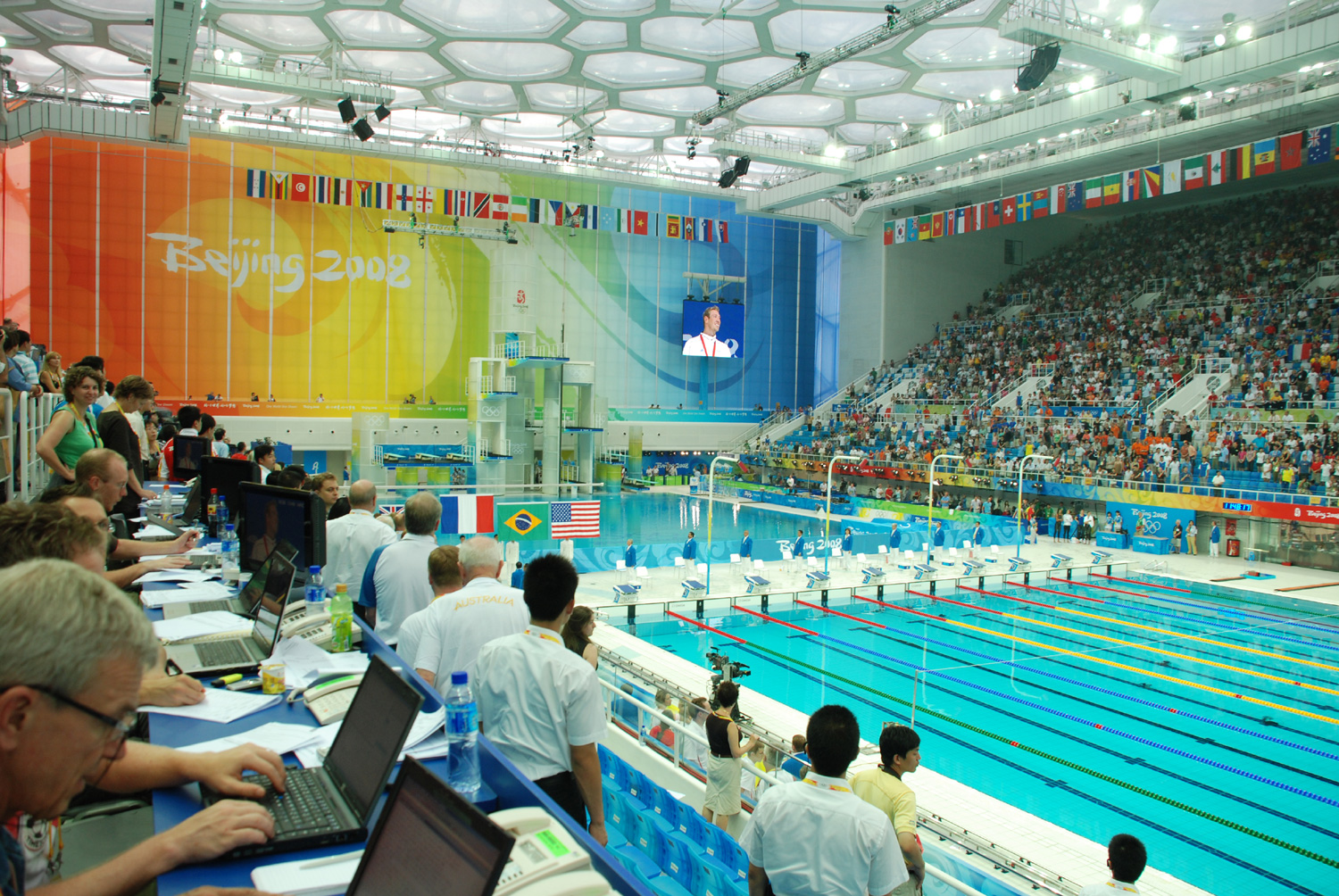
- Venue: Beijing National Aquatics Center
- Dates: 7–15 September 2008

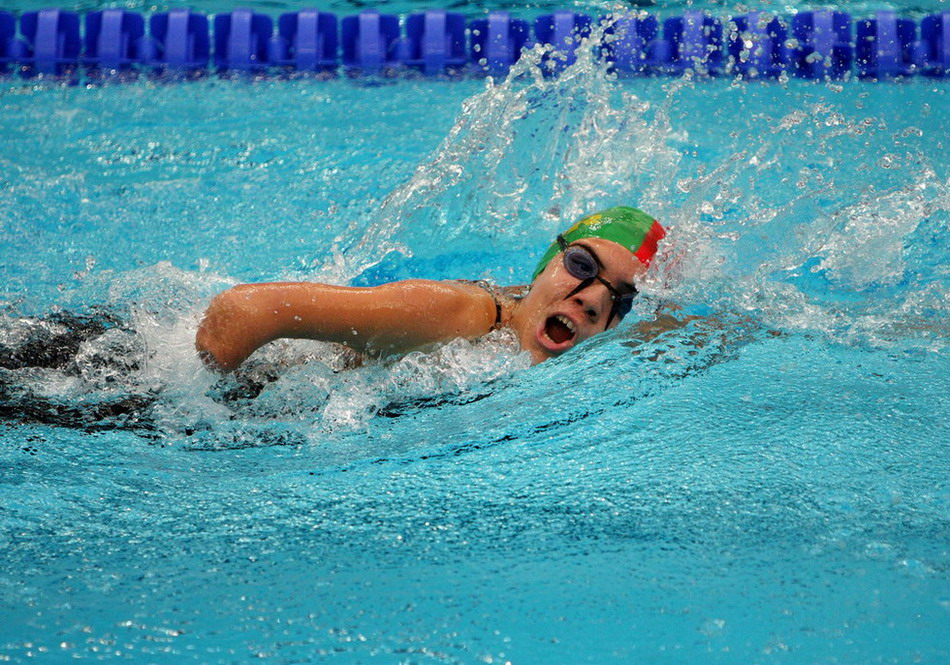
Women's Freestyle swimming

The swimming events of the 2008 Summer Paralympics were held in the Beijing National Aquatics Center between September 7 and September 15, 2008. A total of 140 gold medals were expected to be distributed. Paralympic records were broken in 122 events, of which the records in 108 events were also world records.

== Classifications ==
Athletes are allocated a classification for each event based upon their disability to allow fairer competition between athletes of similar ability. The classifications for swimming are:

- Visual impairment
  - S11-S13
- Other disability
  - S1-S10 (Freestyle, backstroke and butterfly)
  - SB1-SB9 (breaststroke)
  - SM1-SM10 (individual medley)

Classifications run from S1 (severely disabled) to S10 (minimally disabled) for athletes with physical disabilities, and S11 (totally blind) to S13 (legally blind) for visually impaired athletes. Blind athletes must use blackened goggles.

== Events ==
Due to the classification process, there were more than one set of medals in each of the traditional swimming events. The following events were held in the various classifications.

Men

Event	S1	S2	S3	S4	S5	S6	S7	S8	S9	S10	S11	S12	S13
50 m freestyle		X	X	X	X	X	X	X	X	X	X	X	X
100 m freestyle		X	X	X	X	X	X	X	X	X	X	X	X
200 m freestyle		X	X	X	X								
400 m freestyle						X	X	X	X	X	X	X	X
50 m backstroke	X	X	X	X	X								
100 m backstroke						X	X	X	X	X	X	X	X
50 m butterfly					X	X	X						
100 m butterfly								X	X	X	X	X	X

Event	SB3	SB4	SB5	SB6	SB7	SB8	SB9	SB11	SB12	SB13
50 m breaststroke	X									
100 m breaststroke		X	X	X	X	X	X	X	X	X

Event	SM4	SM5	SM6	SM7	SM8	SM9	SM10	SM12	SM13
150 m individual medley	X								
200 m individual medley		X	X	X	X	X	X	X	X

Event	20pts	34pts
4 × 50 m freestyle relay	X	
4 × 100 m freestyle relay		X
4 × 50 m medley relay	X	
4 × 100 m medley relay		X

Women

Event	S2	S3	S4	S5	S6	S7	S8	S9	S10	S11	S12	S13
50 m freestyle		X	X	X	X	X	X	X	X	X	X	X
100 m freestyle			X	X	X	X	X	X	X	X	X	X
200 m freestyle				X								
400 m freestyle					X	X	X	X	X			X
50 m backstroke	X	X		X								
100 m backstroke					X	X	X	X	X			X
50 m butterfly					X	X						
100 m butterfly							X	X	X		X	X

Event	SB4	SB5	SB6	SB7	SB8	SB9	SB12
100 m breaststroke	X	X	X	X	X	X	X

Event	SM4	SM6	SM7	SM8	SM9	SM10	SM12	SM13
150 m individual medley	X							
200 m individual medley		X	X	X	X	X	X	X

== Qualification ==
There were 547 athletes (323 male, 224 female) from 62 nations that took part in this sport.

- Argentina (12)
- Australia (35)
- Austria (2)
- Barbados (1)
- Belarus (6)
- Belgium (2)
- Brazil (24)
- Canada (21)
- Chile (1)
- China (40)
- Chinese Taipei (1)
- Colombia (3)
- Croatia (4)
- Cuba (1)
- Cyprus (2)
- Czech Republic (7)
- Denmark (4)
- Estonia (2)
- Faroe Islands (1)
- Finland (1)
- France (12)
- Germany (21)
- Great Britain (35)
- Greece (13)
- Hungary (11)
- Iceland (2)
- Indonesia (1)
- Ireland (6)
- Israel (7)
- Italy (10)
- Japan (18)
- Kazakhstan (1)
- Lithuania (2)
- Macau (1)
- Madagascar (1)
- Malaysia (2)
- Mauritius (1)
- Mexico (11)
- Montenegro (1)
- Myanmar (2)
- Netherlands (7)
- New Zealand (3)
- Norway (5)
- Panama (1)
- Peru (2)
- Poland (12)
- Portugal (8)
- Russia (34)
- Singapore (2)
- Slovakia (3)
- Slovenia (1)
- South Africa (10)
- South Korea (5)
- Spain (39)
- Sweden (4)
- Switzerland (1)
- Thailand (8)
- Ukraine (31)
- United States (38)
- Uzbekistan (1)
- Venezuela (3)
- Vietnam (1)

== Medal summary ==
=== Medal table ===
This ranking sorts countries by the number of gold medals earned by their swimmers (in this context a country is an entity represented by a National Paralympic Committee). The number of silver medals is taken into consideration next and then the number of bronze medals. If, after the above, countries are still tied, equal ranking is given and they are listed alphabetically.

Rank	Nation	Gold	Silver	Bronze	Total
1	United States (USA)	17	14	13	44
2	China (CHN)	13	22	17	52
3	Ukraine (UKR)	13	10	20	43
4	Great Britain (GBR)	11	12	18	41
5	Russia (RUS)	11	9	7	27
6	Spain (ESP)	10	12	9	31
7	Australia (AUS)	9	11	9	29
8	Brazil (BRA)	8	7	4	19
9	South Africa (RSA)	8	0	1	9
10	Canada (CAN)	7	7	9	23
11	Mexico (MEX)	5	1	2	8
12	Greece (GRE)	4	5	3	12
13	New Zealand (NZL)	4	2	0	6
14	Belarus (BLR)	3	2	1	6
15	Poland (POL)	2	5	3	10
16	France (FRA)	2	4	0	6
17	Netherlands (NED)	2	2	2	6
18	Czech Republic (CZE)	2	1	4	7
19	Sweden (SWE)	2	0	1	3
20	Germany (GER)	1	3	5	9
21	Japan (JPN)	1	2	2	5
22	Italy (ITA)	1	2	0	3
23	Singapore (SIN)	1	1	0	2
24	Hungary (HUN)	1	0	4	5
25	Cyprus (CYP)	1	0	1	2
25	Denmark (DEN)	1	0	1	2
25	Norway (NOR)	1	0	1	2
28	Israel (ISR)	0	3	0	3
29	South Korea (KOR)	0	1	1	2
30	Ireland (IRL)	0	1	0	1
31	Argentina (ARG)	0	0	1	1
31	Colombia (COL)	0	0	1	1
31	Estonia (EST)	0	0	1	1
31	Portugal (POR)	0	0	1	1
Totals (34 entries)		141	139	142	422

=== Men's events ===
Event	Gold	Silver	Bronze
50 m freestyle S2	Georgios Kapellakis; Greece	Dmitrii Kokarev; Russia	James Anderson; Great Britain
50 m freestyle S3	Dmytro Vynohradets; Ukraine	Du Jianping; China	Byeong-Eon Min; South Korea
50 m freestyle S4	David Smétanine; France	Richard Oribe; Spain	Jan Povysil; Czech Republic
50 m freestyle S5	Dmytro Kryzhanovskyy; Ukraine	Daniel Dias; Brazil	Sebastián Rodríguez; Spain
50 m freestyle S6	Xu Qing; China	Tang Yuan; China	Anders Olsson; Sweden
50 m freestyle S7	David Roberts; Great Britain	Matt Walker; Great Britain	Lantz Lamback; United States
50 m freestyle S8	Xiaofu Wang; China	Peter Leek; Australia	Konstantin Lisenkov; Russia
50 m freestyle S9	Matthew Cowdrey; Australia	Zhi Guo; China	Xiaoming Xion; China
50 m freestyle S10	André Brasil; Brazil	Phelipe Rodrigues; Brazil	Benoit Huot; Canada
50 m freestyle S11	Enhamed Enhamed; Spain	Junichi Kawai; Japan	Alexander Chekurov; Russia
50 m freestyle S12	Maksym Veraksa; Ukraine	Alexander Nevolin-Svetov; Russia	Sergii Klippert; Ukraine
50 m freestyle S13	Oleksii Fedyna; Ukraine	Charalampos Taiganidis; Greece	Andrey Strokin; Russia
100 m freestyle S2	Dmitrii Kokarev; Russia	Georgios Kapellakis; Greece	James Anderson; Great Britain
100 m freestyle S3	Du Jianping; China	Dmytro Vynohradets; Ukraine	Li Hanhua; China
100 m freestyle S4	David Smétanine; France	Richard Oribe; Spain	Jan Povysil; Czech Republic
100 m freestyle S5	Daniel Dias; Brazil	Dmytro Kryzhanovskyy; Ukraine	Roy Perkins; United States
100 m freestyle S6	Anders Olsson; Sweden	Yuan Tang; China	Yuanrun Yang; China
100 m freestyle S7	David Roberts; Great Britain	Lantz Lamback; United States	Matt Walker; Great Britain
100 m freestyle S8	Xiaofu Wang; China	Konstantin Lisenkov; Russia	Peter Leek; Australia
100 m freestyle S9	Matthew Cowdrey; Australia	Zhi Guo; China	Tamás Sors; Hungary
100 m freestyle S10	André Brasil; Brazil	Phelipe Rodrigues; Brazil	Benoit Huot; Canada
100 m freestyle S11	Enhamed Enhamed; Spain	Bozun Yang; China	Grzegorz Polkowski; Poland
100 m freestyle S12	Maksym Veraksa; Ukraine	Sergii Klippert; Ukraine	Alexander Nevolin-Svetov; Russia
100 m freestyle S13	Charalampos Taiganidis; Greece	Oleksii Fedyna; Ukraine	Danylo Chufarov; Ukraine
200 m freestyle S2	Dmitrii Kokarev; Russia	James Anderson; Great Britain	Georgios Kapellakis; Greece
200 m freestyle S3	Dmytro Vynohradets; Ukraine	Li Hanhua; China	Du Jianping; China
200 m freestyle S4	Richard Oribe; Spain	David Smétanine; France	Jan Povysil; Czech Republic
200 m freestyle S5	Daniel Dias; Brazil	Sebastián Rodríguez; Spain	Anthony Stephens; Great Britain
400 m freestyle S6	Anders Olsson; Sweden	Darragh McDonald; Ireland	Matthew Whorwood; Great Britain
400 m freestyle S7	David Roberts; Great Britain	Lantz Lamback; United States	Jay Dohnt; Australia
400 m freestyle S8	Sam Hynd; Great Britain	Peter Leek; Australia	Jiachao Wang; China
400 m freestyle S9	Jesús Collado; Spain	Matthew Cowdrey; Australia	Tamás Sors; Hungary
400 m freestyle S10	André Brasil; Brazil	Robert Welbourn; Great Britain	Benoit Huot; Canada
400 m freestyle S11	Enhamed Enhamed; Spain	Bozun Yang; China	Donovan Tildesley; Canada
400 m freestyle S12	Sergei Punko; Belarus	Enrique Floriano; Spain	Sergii Klippert; Ukraine
400 m freestyle S13	Charl Bouwer; South Africa	Danylo Chufarov; Ukraine	Charalampos Taiganidis; Greece
50 m backstroke S1	Christos Tampaxis; Greece	Andreas Katsaros; Greece	João Martins; Portugal
50 m backstroke S2	Dmitrii Kokarev; Russia	Jim Anderson; Great Britain	Georgios Kapellakis; Greece
50 m backstroke S3	Du Jianping; China	Min Byeong-Eon; South Korea	Dmytro Vynohradets; Ukraine
50 m backstroke S4	Juan Reyes; Mexico	David Smétanine; France	Huabin Zeng; China
50 m backstroke S5	Daniel Dias; Brazil	Junquan He; China	Zsolt Vereczkei; Hungary
100 m backstroke S6	Igor Plotnikov; Russia	Yuanrun Yang; China	Yuan Tang; China
100 m backstroke S7	Lantz Lamback; United States	Jon Fox; Great Britain	Guillermo Marro; Argentina
100 m backstroke S8	Konstantin Lisenkov; Russia	Peter Leek; Australia	Sean Fraser; Great Britain
100 m backstroke S9	Matthew Cowdrey; Australia	Zhi Guo; China	Jarrett Perry; United States
100 m backstroke S10	Justin Zook; United States	Michael Anderson; Australia	Kardo Ploomipuu; Estonia
100 m backstroke S11	Bozun Yang; China	Damian Pietrasik; Poland	Viktor Smyrnov; Ukraine
100 m backstroke S12	Alexander Nevolin-Svetov; Russia	Sergii Klippert; Ukraine	Maksym Veraksa; Ukraine
100 m backstroke S13	Charalampos Taiganidis; Greece	Oleksii Fedyna; Ukraine	Dmytro Aleksyeyev; Ukraine
50 m breaststroke SB3	Takayuki Suzuki; Japan	Vicente Gil; Spain	Miguel Luque; Spain
100 m breaststroke SB4	Ricardo Ten; Spain	Daniel Dias; Brazil	Moisés Fuentes; Colombia
100 m breaststroke SB5	Pedro Rangel; Mexico	Thomas Grimm; Germany	Tadhg Slattery; South Africa
100 m breaststroke SB6	Alexey Fomenkov; Russia	Gareth Duke; Great Britain	Matt Whorwood; Great Britain
100 m breaststroke SB7	Sascha Kindred; Great Britain	Blake Cochrane; Australia	Rudy Garcia-Tolson; United States
100 m breaststroke SB8	Andriy Kalyna; Ukraine	Xiaofu Wang; China	Alejandro Sánchez; Spain
100 m breaststroke SB9	Kevin Paul; South Africa	Furong Lin; China	Denis Dorogaev; Russia
100 m breaststroke SB11	Oleksandr Mashchenko; Ukraine	Bozun Yang; China	Viktor Smyrnov; Ukraine
100 m breaststroke SB12	Maksym Veraksa; Ukraine	Sergei Punko; Belarus	Sergii Klippert; Ukraine
100 m breaststroke SB13	Oleksii Fedyna; Ukraine	Daniel Sharp; New Zealand	Uladzimir Izotau; Belarus
50 m butterfly S5	Roy Perkins; United States	Daniel Dias; Brazil	Junquan He; China
50 m butterfly S6	Xu Qing; China	Kyosuke Oyama; Japan	Sascha Kindred; Great Britain
50 m butterfly S7	Rong Tian; China	Matt Walker; Great Britain	Mang Pei; China
100 m butterfly S8	Peter Leek; Australia	Wei Yanpeng; China	Wang Xiaofu; China
100 m butterfly S9	Tamás Sors; Hungary	Matthew Cowdrey; Australia	Guo Zhi; China
100 m butterfly S10	André Brasil; Brazil	David Julian Levecq; Spain	Mike van der Zanden; Netherlands
100 m butterfly S11	Enhamed Enhamed; Spain	Oleksandr Mashchenko; Ukraine	Junichi Kawai; Japan; Viktor Smyrnov; Ukraine
100 m butterfly S12	Raman Makarau; Belarus	Sergei Punko; Belarus	Anton Stabrovskyy; Ukraine
100 m butterfly S13	Dzmitry Salei; Belarus	Charalampos Taiganidis; Greece	Andrey Strokin; Russia
150 m individual medley SM4	Cameron Leslie; New Zealand	Vicente Javier Torres; Spain	Takayuki Suzuki; Japan
200 m individual medley SM5	Daniel Dias; Brazil	Junquan He; China	Pablo Cimadevila Álvarez; Spain
200 m individual medley SM6	Sascha Kindred; Great Britain	Yang Yuanrun; China	Xu Qing; China
200 m individual medley SM7	Rudy Garcia-Tolson; United States	Tian Rong; China	Matt Walker; Great Britain
200 m individual medley SM8	Peter Leek; Australia	Jiachao Wang; China	Sam Hynd; Great Britain
200 m individual medley SM9	Matthew Cowdrey; Australia	Andriy Kalyna; Ukraine	Cody Bureau; United States
200 m individual medley SM10	Rick Pendleton; Australia	André Brasil; Brazil	Benoit Huot; Canada
200 m individual medley SM12	Maksym Veraksa; Ukraine	Alexander Nevolin-Svetov; Russia	Sergii Klippert; Ukraine
200 m individual medley SM13	Oleksii Fedyna; Ukraine	Charalampos Taiganidis; Greece	Dmytro Aleksyeyev; Ukraine
4×50 m freestyle 20pts	China (CHN); Jianping Du; Yuan Tang; Junguan He; Yuanrun Yang	Spain (ESP); Richard Oribe; Daniel Vidal; Jordi Gordillo; Sebastián Rodríguez	Brazil (BRA); Clodoaldo Silva; Joon Seo; Daniel Dias; Adriano Lima
4×100 m freestyle 34pts	Great Britain (GBR); Matt Walker; Graham Edmunds; David Roberts; Robert Welbourn	Australia (AUS); Ben Austin; Peter Leek; Sam Bramham; Matthew Cowdrey	China (CHN); Xiaoming Xiong; Yanpeng Wei; Xiaofu Wang; Zhi Guo
4×50 m medley 20pts	China (CHN); Du Jianping; Tang Yuan; Xu Qing; Yang Yuanrun	Brazil (BRA); Daniel Dias; Ivanildo Vasconcelos; Luis Silva; Clodoaldo Silva	Spain (ESP); Pablo Cimadevila; Vicente Gil; Daniel Vidal; Sebastián Rodríguez
4×100 m medley 34pts	Australia (AUS); Matthew Cowdrey; Rick Pendleton; Peter Leek; Ben Austin	China (CHN); Guo Zhi; Lin Furong; Wang Xiaofu; Wei Yanpeng	Ukraine (UKR); Ievgen Poltavskyi; Andriy Kalyna; Andriy Sirovatchenko; Taras Yastremskyy

=== Women's events ===
Event	Gold	Silver	Bronze
50 m freestyle S3	Patricia Valle; Mexico	Pin Xiu Yip; Singapore	Fran Williamson; Great Britain
50 m freestyle S4	Nely Miranda; Mexico	Cheryl Angelelli; United States	Edênia Garcia; Brazil
50 m freestyle S5	Teresa Perales; Spain	Běla Hlaváčková; Czech Republic	Olena Akopyan; Ukraine
50 m freestyle S6	Mirjam De Koning-Peper; Netherlands	Doramitzi González; Mexico	Natalie Jones; Great Britain
50 m freestyle S7	Cortney Jordan; United States	Erin Popovich; United States	Kirsten Bruhn; Germany
50 m freestyle S8	Cecilie Drabsch Norland; Norway	Amanda Everlove; United States	Jacqueline Freney; Australia
50 m freestyle S9	Natalie du Toit; South Africa	Irina Grazhdanova; Russia	Louise Watkin; Great Britain
50 m freestyle S10	Anne Polinario; Canada	Katarzyna Pawlik; Poland	Katrina Lewis; Australia
50 m freestyle S11	Maria Poiani Panigati; Italy	Cecilia Camellini; Italy	Fabiana Sugimori; Brazil
50 m freestyle S12	Oxana Savchenko; Russia	Anna Efimenko; Russia	Deborah Font; Spain
50 m freestyle S13	Kelley Becherer; United States	Valerie Grand'Maison; Canada	Iryna Balashova; Ukraine
100 m freestyle S4	Nely Miranda; Mexico	Cheryl Angelelli; United States	Aimee Bruder; United States
100 m freestyle S5	Teresa Perales; Spain	Inbal Pezaro; Israel	Běla Hlaváčková; Czech Republic
100 m freestyle S6	Eleanor Simmonds; Great Britain	Mirjam De Koning-Peper; Netherlands	Doramitzi González; Mexico
100 m freestyle S7	Erin Popovich; United States	Cortney Jordan; United States	Kirsten Bruhn; Germany
100 m freestyle S8	Jessica Long; United States	Heather Frederiksen; Great Britain	Jacqueline Freney; Australia
100 m freestyle S9	Natalie du Toit; South Africa	Louise Watkin; Great Britain	Stephanie Dixon; Canada
100 m freestyle S10	Ashley Owens; United States	Katarzyna Pawlik; Poland	Anna Eames; United States
100 m freestyle S11	Qing Xie; China	Cecilia Camellini; Italy	Daniela Schulte; Germany
100 m freestyle S12	Oxana Savchenko; Russia	Anna Efimenko; Russia	Joanna Mendak; Poland
100 m freestyle S13	Valerie Grand'Maison; Canada	Chelsey Gotell; Canada	Kelley Becherer; United States
200 m freestyle S5	Teresa Perales; Spain	Inbal Pezaro; Israel	Olena Akopyan; Ukraine
400 m freestyle S6	Eleanor Simmonds; Great Britain	Mirjam De Koning-Peper; Netherlands	Maria Goetze; Germany
400 m freestyle S7	Erin Popovich; United States	Cortney Jordan; United States	Kirsten Bruhn; Germany
400 m freestyle S8	Jessica Long; United States	Heather Frederiksen; Great Britain	Jacqueline Freney; Australia
400 m freestyle S9	Natalie du Toit; South Africa	Stephanie Dixon; Canada	Ellie Cole; Australia
400 m freestyle S10	Katarzyna Pawlik; Poland	Ashley Owens; United States	Susan Beth Scott; United States
400 m freestyle S13	Valerie Grand'Maison; Canada	Anna Efimenko; Russia	Kelley Becherer; United States; Chelsey Gotell; Canada
50 m backstroke S2	Ganna Ielisavetska; Ukraine	Iryna Sotska; Ukraine	Sara Carracelas; Spain
50 m backstroke S3	Yip Pin Xiu; Singapore	Fran Williamson; Great Britain	Xia Jiangbo; China
50 m backstroke S5	Běla Hlaváčková; Czech Republic	Teresa Perales; Spain	Karina Lauridsen; Denmark
100 m backstroke S6	Mirjam De Koning-Peper; Netherlands	Nyree Lewis; Great Britain	Fuying Jiang; China
100 m backstroke S7	Katrina Porter; Australia	Kirsten Bruhn; Germany	Chantal Boonacker; Netherlands
100 m backstroke S8	Heather Frederiksen; Great Britain	Jessica Long; United States	Mariann Vestbostad; Norway
100 m backstroke S9	Stephanie Dixon; Canada	Elizabeth Stone; United States	Ellie Cole; Australia
100 m backstroke S10	Sophie Pascoe; New Zealand; Shireen Sapiro; South Africa		Esther Morales; Spain
100 m backstroke S13	Chelsey Gotell; Canada	Valerie Grand'Maison; Canada	Anna Efimenko; Russia
100 m breaststroke SB4	Běla Hlaváčková; Czech Republic	Inbal Pezaro; Israel	Teresa Perales; Spain
100 m breaststroke SB5	Kirsten Bruhn; Germany	Rachel Lardière; France	Gitta Ráczkó; Hungary
100 m breaststroke SB6	Elizabeth Johnson; Great Britain	Sarah Bowen; Australia	Deborah Gruen; United States
100 m breaststroke SB7	Erin Popovich; United States	Min Huang; China	Jessica Long; United States
100 m breaststroke SB8	Olesya Vladykina; Russia	Paulina Wozniak; Poland	Claire Cashmore; Great Britain
100 m breaststroke SB9	Sophie Pascoe; New Zealand	Sarai Gascón; Spain	Louise Watkin; Great Britain
100 m breaststroke SB12	Karolina Pelendritou; Cyprus	Sandra Gomez; Spain	Yaryna Matlo; Ukraine
50 m butterfly S6	Fuying Jiang; China	Anastasia Diodorova; Russia	Olena Akopyan; Ukraine
50 m butterfly S7	Min Huang; China	Erin Popovich; United States	Verônica Almeida; Brazil
100 m butterfly S8	Jessica Long; United States	Amanda Everlove; United States	Jin Xiaoqin; China
100 m butterfly S9	Natalie du Toit; South Africa	Ellie Cole; Australia	Annabelle Williams; Australia
100 m butterfly S10	Anna Eames; United States	Sophie Pascoe; New Zealand	Shuai Wang; China
100 m butterfly S12	Joanna Mendak; Poland	Ana García-Arcicollar; Spain	Yuliya Volkova; Ukraine
100 m butterfly S13	Valérie Grand'Maison; Canada	Kirby Cote; Canada	Chelsey Gotell; Canada
150 m individual medley SM4	Karina Lauridsen; Denmark	Marayke Jonkers; Australia	Patricia Valle; Mexico
200 m individual medley SM6	Miranda Uhl; United States	Maria Goetze; Germany	Natalie Jones; Great Britain
200 m individual medley SM7	Erin Popovich; United States	Huang Min; China	Cortney Jordan; United States
200 m individual medley SM8	Jessica Long; United States	Amanda Everlove; United States	Heather Frederiksen; Great Britain
200 m individual medley SM9	Natalie du Toit; South Africa	Stephanie Dixon; Canada	Louise Watkin; Great Britain
200 m individual medley SM10	Sophie Pascoe; New Zealand	Elodie Lorandi; France	Katarzyna Pawlik; Poland
200 m individual medley SM12	Oxana Savchenko; Russia	Joanna Mendak; Poland	Karolina Pelendritou; Cyprus
200 m individual medley SM13	Chelsey Gotell; Canada	Kirby Cote; Canada	Valérie Grand'Maison; Canada

== See also ==
- Swimming at the 2008 Summer Olympics
- List of Paralympic records in swimming
- 2008 in swimming
