= Swimming at the 2008 Summer Paralympics – Men's 50 metre freestyle S11 =

Men's 50m Freestyle S11 at the XIII Paralympic Games
- Venue: Beijing National Aquatics Center
- Dates: 14 September
- Competitors: 17 from 10 nations
- Winning time: 25.82

Medalists
1st place, gold medalist(s)		Enhamed Enhamed	Spain
2nd place, silver medalist(s)		Junichi Kawai	Japan
3rd place, bronze medalist(s)		Alexander Chekurov	Russia

The men's 50m freestyle S11 event at the 2008 Summer Paralympics took place at the Beijing National Aquatics Center on 14 September. There were three heats; the swimmers with the eight fastest times advanced to the final.

== Results ==
=== Heats ===
Competed from 09:00.

==== Heat 1 ====
Rank	Name	Nationality	Time	Notes
1	Alexander Chekurov	Russia	27.51	Q
2	Grzegorz Polkowski	Poland	28.18	Q
3	Keiichi Kimura	Japan	28.35	
4	Konstantin Tychkov	Russia	28.47	
5	Izhar Cohen	Israel	28.66	

==== Heat 2 ====
Rank	Name	Nationality	Time	Notes
1	Enhamed Enhamed	Spain	26.34	Q
2	Junichi Kawai	Japan	27.43	Q
3	Oleksandr Mashchenko	Ukraine	28.20	Q
4	Damian Pietrasik	Poland	28.56	
5	Eduardo Cruz	Spain	29.34	
6	Pavel Muravyev	Kazakhstan	31.59	

==== Heat 3 ====
Rank	Name	Nationality	Time	Notes
1	Yang Bozun	China	27.10	Q
2	Donovan Tildesley	Canada	28.13	Q
3	Viktor Smyrnov	Ukraine	28.13	Q
4	Philip Scholz	United States	29.23	
5	Marcin Ryszka	Poland	29.38	
6	Rustam Nurmukhametov	Russia	29.44	

=== Final ===
Competed at 17:00.

Rank	Name	Nationality	Time	Notes
1st place, gold medalist(s)	Enhamed Enhamed	Spain	25.82	WR
2nd place, silver medalist(s)	Junichi Kawai	Japan	27.16	
3rd place, bronze medalist(s)	Alexander Chekurov	Russia	27.26	
4	Yang Bozun	China	27.30	
5	Viktor Smyrnov	Ukraine	27.74	
6	Grzegorz Polkowski	Poland	27.83	
7	Donovan Tildesley	Canada	28.08	
8	Oleksandr Mashchenko	Ukraine	28.44	

Q = qualified for final. WR = World Record.
