= Swimming at the 2012 Summer Paralympics – Men's 100 metre freestyle S11 =

Event at the 2012 Summer Paralympics

Men's 100m Freestyle S11 at the XIV Paralympic Games
- Venue: London Aquatics Centre
- Dates: 31 August 2012
- Competitors: 14 from 10 nations
- Winning time: 57.43

Medalists
| 1st place, gold medalist(s) | | Bradley Snyder | United States |
| 2nd place, silver medalist(s) | | Yang Bozun | China |
| 3rd place, bronze medalist(s) | | Hendri Herbst | South Africa |

The men's 100m freestyle S11 event at the 2012 Summer Paralympics took place at the London Aquatics Centre on 31 August. There were two heats; the swimmers with the eight fastest times advanced to the final.

== Results ==
=== Heats ===
Competed from 10:46.

==== Heat 1 ====
| Rank | Lane | Name | Nationality | Time | Notes |
|---|---|---|---|---|---|
| 1 | 5 | Hendri Herbst | South Africa | 59.64 | Q |
| 2 | 7 | Alexander Chekurov | Russia | 1:01.99 | Q |
| 3 | 4 | Enhamed Enhamed | Spain | 1:02.08 | Q |
| 4 | 6 | Donovan Tildesley | Canada | 1:02.64 | Q |
| 5 | 3 | Grzegorz Polkowski | Poland | 1:02.75 | Q |
| 6 | 2 | Viktor Smyrnov | Ukraine | 1:03.26 | |
| 7 | 1 | Dmytro Zalevskyi | Ukraine | 1:06.29 | |

==== Heat 2 ====
| Rank | Lane | Name | Nationality | Time | Notes |
|---|---|---|---|---|---|
| 1 | 4 | Bradley Snyder | United States | 57.18 | Q, PR |
| 2 | 5 | Yang Bozun | China | 57.35 | Q, AS |
| 3 | 3 | Keiichi Kimura | Japan | 1:01.58 | Q |
| 4 | 7 | Matheus Souza | Brazil | 1:02.99 | |
| 5 | 2 | Oleksandr Mashchenko | Ukraine | 1:03.62 | |
| 6 | 6 | Rustam Nurmukhametov | Russia | 1:04.18 | |
| 7 | 1 | Marcin Ryszka | Poland | 1:06.59 | |

=== Final ===
Competed at 19:01.

| Rank | Lane | Name | Nationality | Time | Notes |
|---|---|---|---|---|---|
| 1st place, gold medalist(s) | 4 | Bradley Snyder | United States | 57.43 | |
| 2nd place, silver medalist(s) | 5 | Yang Bozun | China | 58.61 | |
| 3rd place, bronze medalist(s) | 3 | Hendri Herbst | South Africa | 59.60 | |
| 4 | 7 | Enhamed Enhamed | Spain | 1:00.76 | |
| 5 | 6 | Keiichi Kimura | Japan | 1:01.19 | |
| 6 | 2 | Alexander Chekurov | Russia | 1:01.56 | |
| 7 | 1 | Donovan Tildesley | Canada | 1:02.06 | |
| 8 | 8 | Grzegorz Polkowski | Poland | 1:02.72 | |

Q = qualified for final. PR = Paralympic Record. AS = Asian Record.
