= Swimming at the 2008 Summer Paralympics – Men's 100 metre freestyle S11 =

Men's 100m Freestyle S11 at the XIII Paralympic Games
- Venue: Beijing National Aquatics Center
- Dates: 12 September
- Competitors: 16 from 11 nations
- Winning time: 57.64

Medalists
1st place, gold medalist(s)		Enhamed Enhamed	Spain
2nd place, silver medalist(s)		Yang Bozun	China
3rd place, bronze medalist(s)		Grzegorz Polkowski	Poland

The men's 100m freestyle S11 event at the 2008 Summer Paralympics took place at the Beijing National Aquatics Center on 12 September. There were three heats; the swimmers with the eight fastest times advanced to the final.

== Results ==
=== Heats ===
Competed from 09:29.

==== Heat 1 ====
Rank	Name	Nationality	Time	Notes
1	Donovan Tildesley	Canada	1:02.14	Q
2	Keiichi Kimura	Japan	1:03.84	Q
3	Alexander Chekurov	Russia	1:04.02	Q
4	Philip Scholz	United States	1:04.11	
5	Damian Pietrasik	Poland	1:04.51	

==== Heat 2 ====
Rank	Name	Nationality	Time	Notes
1	Enhamed Enhamed	Spain	1:00.52	Q
2	Viktor Smyrnov	Ukraine	1:03.01	Q
3	Eduardo Cruz	Spain	1:05.05	
4	Rustam Nurmukhametov	Russia	1:05.51	
5	Pavel Muravyev	Kazakhstan	1:12.40	

==== Heat 3 ====
Rank	Name	Nationality	Time	Notes
1	Yang Bozun	China	59.04	Q
2	Grzegorz Polkowski	Poland	1:01.23	Q
3	Konstantin Tychkov	Russia	1:04.02	Q
4	Izhar Cohen	Israel	1:06.71	
5	Marcin Ryszka	Poland	1:06.91	
6	Stephen Campbell	Ireland	1:08.08	

=== Final ===
Competed at 17:20.

Rank	Name	Nationality	Time	Notes
1st place, gold medalist(s)	Enhamed Enhamed	Spain	57.64	PR
2nd place, silver medalist(s)	Yang Bozun	China	59.25	
3rd place, bronze medalist(s)	Grzegorz Polkowski	Poland	1:00.49	
4	Donovan Tildesley	Canada	1:01.92	
5	Keiichi Kimura	Japan	1:02.72	
6	Konstantin Tychkov	Russia	1:02.82	
7	Alexander Chekurov	Russia	1:03.41	
	Viktor Smyrnov	Ukraine		DQ

Q = qualified for final. PR = Paralympic Record. DQ = Disqualified.
