= Swimming at the 2004 Summer Paralympics – Men's 50 metre freestyle S11 =

Men's 50m Freestyle S11 at the XII Paralympic Games
- Paralympic Swimming
- Venue: Olympic Aquatic Centre
- Dates: 26 September 2004
- Competitors: 16 from 10 nations
- Winning time: 26.64

Medalists
1st place, gold medalist(s)		Junichi Kawai	Japan
2nd place, silver medalist(s)		Grzegorz Polkowski	Poland
3rd place, bronze medalist(s)		Viktor Smyrnov	Ukraine

The Men's 50 metre freestyle S11 swimming event at the 2004 Summer Paralympics was competed on 26 September. It was won by Junichi Kawai, representing Japan.

== 1st round ==
Qualified for final round

Heat 1

26 Sept. 2004, morning session

Rank	Athlete	Time	Notes
1	Viktor Smyrnov (UKR)	27.90	
2	Grzegorz Polkowski (POL)	27.95	
3	Izhar Cohen (ISR)	28.49	
4	Enhamed Mohamed (ESP)	30.13	
5	Javier Goni (ESP)	30.48	
6	Panom Lagsanaprim (THA)	31.07	
7	Guo Yang (CHN)	31.41	
	Miguel Deniz (ESP)	DSQ	

Heat 2

26 Sept. 2004, morning session

Rank	Athlete	Time	Notes
1	Junichi Kawai (JPN)	27.22	
2	Donovan Tildesley (CAN)	28.27	
3	Rodrigo Ribeiro (BRA)	28.48	
4	Arpiwat Aranghiran (THA)	28.68	
5	Oleksandr Mashchenko (UKR)	29.60	
6	Wang Chen (CHN)	29.64	
7	Andre Meneghetti (BRA)	30.82	
8	Adonis Leon (CUB)	30.86	

== Final round ==
26 Sept. 2004, evening session

Rank	Athlete	Time	Notes
1st place, gold medalist(s)	Junichi Kawai (JPN)	26.64	
2nd place, silver medalist(s)	Grzegorz Polkowski (POL)	26.98	
3rd place, bronze medalist(s)	Viktor Smyrnov (UKR)	27.27	
4	Donovan Tildesley (CAN)	27.76	
5	Izhar Cohen (ISR)	28.17	
6	Arpiwat Aranghiran (THA)	28.58	
7	Rodrigo Ribeiro (BRA)	28.60	
8	Oleksandr Mashchenko (UKR)	29.38	
