= Swimming at the 2004 Summer Paralympics – Men's 100 metre backstroke S11 =

Men's 100m Backstroke S11 at the XII Paralympic Games
- Paralympic Swimming
- Venue: Olympic Aquatic Centre
- Dates: 25 September 2004
- Competitors: 10 from 7 nations
- Winning time: 1:11.29

Medalists
| 1st place, gold medalist(s) | | Viktor Smyrnov | Ukraine |
| 2nd place, silver medalist(s) | | Javier Goni | Spain |
| 3rd place, bronze medalist(s) | | Junichi Kawai | Japan |

The Men's 100 metre backstroke S11 swimming event at the 2004 Summer Paralympics was competed on 25 September. It was won by Viktor Smyrnov, representing Ukraine.

== 1st round ==
| Qualified for next round |

Heat 1

25 Sept. 2004, morning session

| Rank | Athlete | Time | Notes |
|---|---|---|---|
| 1 | Viktor Smyrnov (UKR) | 1:12.51 | |
| 2 | Javier Goni (ESP) | 1:14.46 | |
| 3 | Oleksandr Mashchenko (UKR) | 1:16.28 | |
| 4 | Grzegorz Polkowski (POL) | 1:18.11 | |
| 5 | Andreas Hausmann (GER) | 1:26.72 | |

Heat 2

25 Sept. 2004, morning session

| Rank | Athlete | Time | Notes |
|---|---|---|---|
| 1 | Donovan Tildesley (CAN) | 1:14.67 | |
| 2 | Damian Pietrasik (POL) | 1:17.08 | |
| 3 | Junichi Kawai (JPN) | 1:18.05 | |
| 4 | Miguel Deniz (ESP) | 1:18.57 | |
| 5 | Wang Chen (CHN) | 1:22.49 | |

== Final round ==
25 Sept. 2004, evening session

| Rank | Athlete | Time | Notes |
|---|---|---|---|
| 1st place, gold medalist(s) | Viktor Smyrnov (UKR) | 1:11.29 | |
| 2nd place, silver medalist(s) | Javier Goni (ESP) | 1:11.71 | |
| 3rd place, bronze medalist(s) | Junichi Kawai (JPN) | 1:12.11 | |
| 4 | Donovan Tildesley (CAN) | 1:12.84 | |
| 5 | Damian Pietrasik (POL) | 1:16.15 | |
| 6 | Miguel Deniz (ESP) | 1:16.45 | |
| 7 | Oleksandr Mashchenko (UKR) | 1:16.84 | |
| 8 | Grzegorz Polkowski (POL) | 1:19.24 | |
