= Swimming at the 2004 Summer Paralympics – Men's 100 metre freestyle S11 =

Sports event

Men's 100m Freestyle S11 at the XII Paralympic Games
- Paralympic Swimming
- Venue: Olympic Aquatic Centre
- Dates: 24 September 2004
- Competitors: 14 from 11 nations
- Winning time: 1:00.79

Medalists
1st place, gold medalist(s)		Viktor Smyrnov	Ukraine
2nd place, silver medalist(s)		Junichi Kawai	Japan
3rd place, bronze medalist(s)		Donovan Tildesley	Canada

The Men's 100 metre freestyle S11 swimming event at the 2004 Summer Paralympics was competed on 24 September. It was won by Viktor Smyrnov, representing Ukraine.

== 1st round ==
Qualified for final round

Heat 1

24 Sept. 2004, morning session

Rank	Athlete	Time	Notes
1	Grzegorz Polkowski (POL)	1:02.41	
2	Viktor Smyrnov (UKR)	1:02.42	
3	Junichi Kawai (JPN)	1:05.16	
4	Izhar Cohen (ISR)	1:06.19	
5	Rodrigo Ribeiro (BRA)	1:06.77	
6	Andre Meneghetti (BRA)	1:09.06	
7	Javier Goni (ESP)	1:10.81	

Heat 2

24 Sept. 2004, morning session

Rank	Athlete	Time	Notes
1	Donovan Tildesley (CAN)	1:02.32	
2	Miguel Deniz (ESP)	1:05.17	
3	Enhamed Mohamed (ESP)	1:05.96	
4	Arpiwat Aranghiran (THA)	1:08.17	
5	Wang Chen (CHN)	1:08.91	
6	Adonis Leon (CUB)	1:09.45	
7	Andreas Hausmann (GER)	1:11.63	

== Final round ==
24 Sept. 2004, evening session

Rank	Athlete	Time	Notes
1st place, gold medalist(s)	Viktor Smyrnov (UKR)	1:00.79	
2nd place, silver medalist(s)	Junichi Kawai (JPN)	1:00.86	
3rd place, bronze medalist(s)	Donovan Tildesley (CAN)	1:00.95	
4	Grzegorz Polkowski (POL)	1:00.99	
5	Miguel Deniz (ESP)	1:04.43	
6	Enhamed Mohamed (ESP)	1:05.55	
7	Izhar Cohen (ISR)	1:07.01	
8	Rodrigo Ribeiro (BRA)	1:07.37	
