= Swimming at the 2004 Summer Paralympics – Men's 400 metre freestyle S11 =

Men's 400m Freestyle S11 at the XII Paralympic Games
- Paralympic Swimming
- Venue: Olympic Aquatic Centre
- Dates: 19 September 2004
- Competitors: 10 from 8 nations
- Winning time: 4:44.79

Medalists
1st place, gold medalist(s)		Viktor Smyrnov	Ukraine
2nd place, silver medalist(s)		Donovan Tildesley	Canada
3rd place, bronze medalist(s)		Enhamed Mohamed	Spain

The Men's 400 metre freestyle S11 swimming event at the 2004 Summer Paralympics was competed on 19 September. It was won by Viktor Smyrnov, representing Ukraine.

== 1st round ==
Qualified for final round

Heat 1

19 Sept. 2004, morning session

Rank	Athlete	Time	Notes
1	Donovan Tildesley (CAN)	4:53.60	
2	Miguel Deniz (ESP)	5:17.32	
3	Grzegorz Polkowski (POL)	5:20.44	
4	Adonis Leon (CUB)	5:36.56	
5	Vladimir Martinez (MEX)	5:36.60	

Heat 2

19 Sept. 2004, morning session

Rank	Athlete	Time	Notes
1	Viktor Smyrnov (UKR)	5:00.38	
2	Enhamed Mohamed (ESP)	5:12.39	
3	Javier Goni (ESP)	5:19.43	
4	Andreas Hausmann (GER)	5:30.93	
5	Andre Meneghetti (BRA)	5:42.49	

== Final round ==
19 Sept. 2004, evening session

Rank	Athlete	Time	Notes
1st place, gold medalist(s)	Viktor Smyrnov (UKR)	4:44.79	
2nd place, silver medalist(s)	Donovan Tildesley (CAN)	4:49.68	
3rd place, bronze medalist(s)	Enhamed Mohamed (ESP)	5:01.64	
4	Miguel Deniz (ESP)	5:01.65	
5	Grzegorz Polkowski (POL)	5:08.17	
6	Javier Goni (ESP)	5:16.03	
7	Andreas Hausmann (GER)	5:24.53	
8	Adonis Leon (CUB)	5:34.23	
