= Swimming at the 2008 Summer Paralympics – Men's 100 metre backstroke S11 =

Men's 100m Backstroke S11 at the XIII Paralympic Games
- Venue: Beijing National Aquatics Center
- Dates: 13 September
- Competitors: 14 from 10 nations
- Winning time: 1:07.74

Medalists
1st place, gold medalist(s)		Yang Bozun	China
2nd place, silver medalist(s)		Damian Pietrasik	Poland
3rd place, bronze medalist(s)		Viktor Smyrnov	Ukraine

The men's 100m backstroke S11 event at the 2008 Summer Paralympics took place at the Beijing National Aquatics Center on 13 September. There were two heats; the swimmers with the eight fastest times advanced to the final.

== Results ==
=== Heats ===
Competed from 09:00.

==== Heat 1 ====
Rank	Name	Nationality	Time	Notes
1	Yang Bozun	China	1:08.40	Q, WR
2	Damian Pietrasik	Poland	1:10.21	Q
3	Oleksandr Mashchenko	Ukraine	1:15.19	Q
4	Enhamed Enhamed	Spain	1:17.27	Q
5	Grzegorz Polkowski	Poland	1:20.01	
6	Eythor Thrastarson	Iceland	1:20.12	
7	Philip Scholz	United States	1:20.46	

==== Heat 2 ====
Rank	Name	Nationality	Time	Notes
1	Viktor Smyrnov	Ukraine	1:11.53	Q
2	Donovan Tildesley	Canada	1:12.62	Q
3	Junichi Kawai	Japan	1:13.17	Q
4	Sergio Zayas	Argentina	1:16.43	Q
5	Rattaporn Jearchan	Thailand	1:17.64	
6	Oleksandr Myroshnychenko	Ukraine	1:19.10	
7	Eduardo Cruz	Spain	1:23.03	

=== Final ===
Competed at 17:00.

Rank	Name	Nationality	Time	Notes
1st place, gold medalist(s)	Yang Bozun	China	1:07.74	WR
2nd place, silver medalist(s)	Damian Pietrasik	Poland	1:08.81	
3rd place, bronze medalist(s)	Viktor Smyrnov	Ukraine	1:09.41	
4	Junichi Kawai	Japan	1:09.46	
5	Donovan Tildesley	Canada	1:11.90	
6	Oleksandr Mashchenko	Ukraine	1:15.07	
7	Sergio Zayas	Argentina	1:16.06	
8	Enhamed Enhamed	Spain	1:16.90	

Q = qualified for final. WR = World Record.
