= Swimming at the 2012 Summer Paralympics – Men's 100 metre butterfly S11 =

Event at the 2012 Summer Paralympics

Men's 100m Butterfly S11 at the XIV Paralympic Games
- Venue: London Aquatics Centre
- Dates: 6 September 2012
- Competitors: 12 from 9 nations
- Winning time: 1:03.32

Medalists
1st place, gold medalist(s)		Viktor Smyrnov	Ukraine
2nd place, silver medalist(s)		Enhamed Enhamed	Spain
3rd place, bronze medalist(s)		Keiichi Kimura	Japan

The men's 100m butterfly S11 event at the 2012 Summer Paralympics took place at the London Aquatics Centre on 6 September. There were two heats; the swimmers with the eight fastest times advanced to the final.

== Results ==
=== Heats ===
Competed from 11:50.

==== Heat 1 ====
Rank	Lane	Name	Nationality	Time	Notes
1	3	Israel Oliver	Spain	1:05.51	Q
2	4	Oleksandr Mashchenko	Ukraine	1:05.68	Q
3	5	Viktor Smyrnov	Ukraine	1:05.76	Q
4	6	Junichi Kawai	Japan	1:07.98	Q
5	2	Leider Alveiro Lemus Rojas	Colombia	1:11.02	
6	7	Rattaporn Jearchan	Thailand	1:29.92	

==== Heat 2 ====
Rank	Lane	Name	Nationality	Time	Notes
1	5	Bradley Snyder	United States	1:05.06	Q
2	3	Keiichi Kimura	Japan	1:06.29	Q
3	4	Enhamed Enhamed	Spain	1:06.54	Q
4	6	Donovan Tildesley	Canada	1:08.76	Q
5	7	Alexander Chekurov	Russia	1:09.97	
6	2	Yunerki Ortega	Cuba	1:15.42	

=== Final ===
Competed at 20:48.

Rank	Lane	Name	Nationality	Time	Notes
1st place, gold medalist(s)	6	Viktor Smyrnov	Ukraine	1:03.32	
2nd place, silver medalist(s)	7	Enhamed Enhamed	Spain	1:03.93	
3rd place, bronze medalist(s)	2	Keiichi Kimura	Japan	1:04.70	AS
4	4	Bradley Snyder	United States	1:05.42	
5	3	Oleksandr Mashchenko	Ukraine	1:05.76	
6	1	Junichi Kawai	Japan	1:07.22	
7	5	Israel Oliver	Spain	1:07.72	
8	8	Donovan Tildesley	Canada	1:07.96	

Q = qualified for final. AS = Asian Record.
