= Swimming at the 2004 Summer Paralympics – Men's 200 metre individual medley SM11 =

Men's 200m Individual Medley SM11 at the XII Paralympic Games
- Paralympic Swimming
- Venue: Olympic Aquatic Centre
- Dates: 22 September 2004
- Competitors: 8 from 6 nations
- Winning time: 2:28.47

Medalists
1st place, gold medalist(s)		Viktor Smyrnov	Ukraine
2nd place, silver medalist(s)		Donovan Tildesley	Canada
3rd place, bronze medalist(s)		Oleksandr Mashchenko	Ukraine

The Men's 200 metre individual medley SM11 swimming event at the 2004 Summer Paralympics was competed on 22 September. It was won by Viktor Smyrnov, representing Ukraine.

== Final round ==
22 Sept. 2004, evening session

Rank	Athlete	Time	Notes
1st place, gold medalist(s)	Viktor Smyrnov (UKR)	2:28.47	
2nd place, silver medalist(s)	Donovan Tildesley (CAN)	2:36.32	
3rd place, bronze medalist(s)	Oleksandr Mashchenko (UKR)	2:36.71	
4	Junichi Kawai (JPN)	2:36.77	
5	Miguel Deniz (ESP)	2:44.61	
6	Wang Chen (CHN)	2:50.59	
7	Vladimir Martinez (MEX)	3:03.60	
	Enhamed Mohamed (ESP)	DSQ	
