= Swimming at the 2008 Summer Paralympics – Men's 100 metre butterfly S11 =

Men's 100m Butterfly S11 at the XIII Paralympic Games
- Venue: Beijing National Aquatics Center
- Dates: 9 September
- Competitors: 15 from 11 nations
- Winning time: 1:01.12

Medalists
1st place, gold medalist(s)		Enhamed Enhamed	Spain
2nd place, silver medalist(s)		Oleksandr Mashchenko	Ukraine
3rd place, bronze medalist(s)		Viktor Smyrnov	Ukraine
3rd place, bronze medalist(s)		Junichi Kawai	Japan

The men's 100m butterfly S11 event at the 2008 Summer Paralympics took place at the Beijing National Aquatics Center on 9 September. There were two heats; the swimmers with the eight fastest times advanced to the final. The final produced a dead-heat for third place and two bronze medals were awarded.

== Results ==
=== Heats ===
Competed from 09:40.

==== Heat 1 ====
Rank	Name	Nationality	Time	Notes
1	Junichi Kawai	Japan	1:05.89	Q
2	Yang Bozun	China	1:06.93	Q
3	Viktor Smyrnov	Ukraine	1:08.28	Q
4	Keiichi Kimura	Japan	1:10.11	Q
5	Stephen Campbell	Ireland	1:16.28	
6	Eduardo Cruz	Spain	1:18.75	
	Marcin Ryszka	Poland		DQ

==== Heat 2 ====
Rank	Name	Nationality	Time	Notes
1	Enhamed Enhamed	Spain	1:03.74	Q
2	Oleksandr Mashchenko	Ukraine	1:06.08	Q
3	Donovan Tildesley	Canada	1:11.03	Q
4	Philip Scholz	United States	1:11.93	Q
5	Konstantin Tychkov	Russia	1:15.44	
6	Alexander Chekurov	Russia	1:21.51	
7	Adonis Leon	Cuba	1:24.50	
	Pavel Muravyev	Kazakhstan		DQ

=== Final ===
Competed at 17:44.

Rank	Name	Nationality	Time	Notes
1st place, gold medalist(s)	Enhamed Enhamed	Spain	1:01.12	WR
2nd place, silver medalist(s)	Oleksandr Mashchenko	Ukraine	1:04.08	
3rd place, bronze medalist(s)	Viktor Smyrnov	Ukraine	1:05.79	
3rd place, bronze medalist(s)	Junichi Kawai	Japan	1:05.79	
5	Yang Bozun	China	1:06.57	
6	Keiichi Kimura	Japan	1:09.39	
7	Donovan Tildesley	Canada	1:09.53	
8	Philip Scholz	United States	1:11.76	

Q = qualified for final. WR = World Record. DQ = Disqualified.
