= Swimming at the 2012 Summer Paralympics – Men's 100 metre backstroke S11 =

Event at the 2012 Summer Paralympics

Men's 100m Backstroke S11 at the XIV Paralympic Games
- Venue: London Aquatics Centre
- Dates: 2 September 2012
- Competitors: 14 from 12 nations
- Winning time: 1:07.81

Medalists
1st place, gold medalist(s)		Dmytro Zalevskyi	Ukraine
2nd place, silver medalist(s)		Yang Bozun	China
3rd place, bronze medalist(s)		Viktor Smyrnov	Ukraine

The men's 100m backstroke S11 event at the 2012 Summer Paralympics took place at the London Aquatics Centre on 2 September. There were two heats; the swimmers with the eight fastest times advanced to the final.

== Results ==
=== Heats ===
Competed from 10:22.

==== Heat 1 ====
Rank	Lane	Name	Nationality	Time	Notes
1	5	Junichi Kawai	Japan	1:10.68	Q
2	4	Viktor Smyrnov	Ukraine	1:10.81	Q
3	3	Oleksandr Mashchenko	Ukraine	1:12.35	Q
4	7	Israel Oliver	Spain	1:12.87	Q
5	6	Hendri Herbst	South Africa	1:14.76	
6	2	Sergio Zayas	Argentina	1:16.33	
7	1	Yunerki Ortega	Cuba	1:23.32	

==== Heat 2 ====
Rank	Lane	Name	Nationality	Time	Notes
1	4	Yang Bozun	China	1:08.92	Q
2	5	Dmytro Zalevskyi	Ukraine	1:11.25	Q
3	1	Bradley Snyder	United States	1:12.01	Q
4	3	Donovan Tildesley	Canada	1:13.17	Q
5	6	Rustam Nurmukhametov	Russia	1:15.86	
6	2	Grzegorz Polkowski	Poland	1:17.32	
7	7	Rattaporn Jearchan	Thailand	1:21.73	

=== Final ===
Competed at 18:04.

Rank	Lane	Name	Nationality	Time	Notes
1st place, gold medalist(s)	6	Dmytro Zalevskyi	Ukraine	1:07.81	EU
2nd place, silver medalist(s)	4	Yang Bozun	China	1:08.07	
3rd place, bronze medalist(s)	3	Viktor Smyrnov	Ukraine	1:08.22	
4	5	Junichi Kawai	Japan	1:08.94	
5	2	Bradley Snyder	United States	1:09.62	
6	1	Israel Oliver	Spain	1:11.58	
7	7	Oleksandr Mashchenko	Ukraine	1:12.94	
8	8	Donovan Tildesley	Canada	1:13.97	

Q = qualified for final. EU = European Record.
