= Swimming at the 2004 Summer Paralympics – Men's 100 metre butterfly S11 =

Men's 100m Butterfly S11 at the XII Paralympic Games
- Paralympic Swimming
- Venue: Olympic Aquatic Centre
- Dates: 21 September 2004
- Competitors: 11 from 9 nations
- Winning time: 1:06.34

Medalists
1st place, gold medalist(s)		Viktor Smyrnov	Ukraine
2nd place, silver medalist(s)		Junichi Kawai	Japan
3rd place, bronze medalist(s)		Enhamed Mohamed	Spain

The Men's 100 metre butterfly S11 swimming event at the 2004 Summer Paralympics was competed on 21 September. It was won by Viktor Smyrnov, representing Ukraine.

== 1st round ==
Qualified for final round

Heat 1

21 Sept. 2004, morning session

Rank	Athlete	Time	Notes
1	Viktor Smyrnov (UKR)	1:09.16	
2	Oleksandr Mashchenko (UKR)	1:19.70	
3	Arpiwat Aranghiran (THA)	1:21.07	
4	Vladimir Martinez (MEX)	1:23.48	
5	Andre Meneghetti (BRA)	1:32.37	

Heat 2

21 Sept. 2004, morning session

Rank	Athlete	Time	Notes
1	Junichi Kawai (JPN)	1:08.51	
2	Donovan Tildesley (CAN)	1:15.82	
3	Wang Chen (CHN)	1:17.46	
4	Enhamed Mohamed (ESP)	1:18.02	
	Gustavo Mujica (VEN)	DSQ	
	Rodrigo Ribeiro (BRA)	DNS	

== Final round ==
21 Sept. 2004, evening session

Rank	Athlete	Time	Notes
1st place, gold medalist(s)	Viktor Smyrnov (UKR)	1:06.34	
2nd place, silver medalist(s)	Junichi Kawai (JPN)	1:06.76	
3rd place, bronze medalist(s)	Enhamed Mohamed (ESP)	1:11.59	
4	Donovan Tildesley (CAN)	1:12.69	
5	Wang Chen (CHN)	1:14.96	
6	Arpiwat Aranghiran (THA)	1:15.44	
7	Vladimir Martinez (MEX)	1:24.23	
8	Andre Meneghetti (BRA)	1:32.99	
