= Swimming at the 2008 Summer Paralympics – Men's 400 metre freestyle S11 =

Men's 400m Freestyle S11 at the XIII Paralympic Games
- Venue: Beijing National Aquatics Center
- Dates: 11 September
- Competitors: 13 from 11 nations
- Winning time: 4:38.32

Medalists
1st place, gold medalist(s)		Enhamed Enhamed	Spain
2nd place, silver medalist(s)		Yang Bozun	China
3rd place, bronze medalist(s)		Donovan Tildesley	Canada

The men's 400m freestyle S11 event at the 2008 Summer Paralympics took place at the Beijing National Aquatics Center on 11 September. There were two heats; the swimmers with the eight fastest times advanced to the final.

== Results ==
=== Heats ===
Competed from 10:50.

==== Heat 1 ====
Rank	Name	Nationality	Time	Notes
1	Yang Bozun	China	4:46.06	Q
2	Donovan Tildesley	Canada	4:57.54	Q
3	Oleksandr Myroshnychenko	Ukraine	5:10.05	Q
4	Keiichi Kimura	Japan	5:15.04	
5	Eduardo Cruz	Spain	5:23.44	
6	Grzegorz Polkowski	Poland	5:33.88	

==== Heat 2 ====
Rank	Name	Nationality	Time	Notes
1	Enhamed Enhamed	Spain	4:54.44	Q
2	Viktor Smyrnov	Ukraine	4:57.43	Q
3	Philip Scholz	United States	5:02.07	Q
4	Sergio Zayas	Argentina	5:10.10	Q
5	Eythor Thrastarson	Iceland	5:11.54	Q
6	Stephen Campbell	Ireland	5:28.43	
7	Prasit Marnnok	Thailand	5:57.49	

=== Final ===
Competed at 18:49.

Rank	Name	Nationality	Time	Notes
1st place, gold medalist(s)	Enhamed Enhamed	Spain	4:38.32	
2nd place, silver medalist(s)	Yang Bozun	China	4:43.29	
3rd place, bronze medalist(s)	Donovan Tildesley	Canada	4:49.45	
4	Viktor Smyrnov	Ukraine	4:52.32	
5	Philip Scholz	United States	4:57.21	
6	Oleksandr Myroshnychenko	Ukraine	5:05.00	
7	Sergio Zayas	Argentina	5:08.13	
8	Eythor Thrastarson	Iceland	5:15.63	

Q = qualified for final.
