= Swimming at the 2012 Summer Paralympics – Men's 200 metre individual medley SM11 =

Men's 200m Ind. Medley SM11 at the XIV Paralympic Games
- Venue: London Aquatics Centre
- Dates: 8 September
- Competitors: 13 from 10 nations
- Winning time: 2:22.40

Medalists
| 1st place, gold medalist(s) | | Yang Bozun | China |
| 2nd place, silver medalist(s) | | Viktor Smyrnov | Ukraine |
| 3rd place, bronze medalist(s) | | Oleksandr Mashchenko | Ukraine |

The men's 200m ind. medley SM11 event at the 2012 Summer Paralympics took place at the London Aquatics Centre on 8 September. There were two heats; the swimmers with the eight fastest times advanced to the final.

== Results ==
=== Heats ===
Competed from 10:59.

==== Heat 1 ====
| Rank | Lane | Name | Nationality | Time | Notes |
|---|---|---|---|---|---|
| 1 | 6 | Israel Oliver | Spain | 2:30.47 | Q |
| 2 | 3 | Bradley Snyder | United States | 2:31.29 | Q |
| 3 | 4 | Oleksandr Mashchenko | Ukraine | 2:34.47 | Q |
| 4 | 5 | Enhamed Enhamed | Spain | 2:40.47 | Q |
| 5 | 2 | Yunerki Ortega | Cuba | 2:45.64 | |
| | 7 | Panom Lagsanaprim | Thailand | DSQ | |

==== Heat 2 ====
| Rank | Lane | Name | Nationality | Time | Notes |
|---|---|---|---|---|---|
| 1 | 6 | Yang Bozun | China | 2:23.43 | Q, AS |
| 2 | 5 | Donovan Tildesley | Canada | 2:30.65 | Q |
| 3 | 4 | Viktor Smyrnov | Ukraine | 2:33.43 | Q |
| 4 | 3 | Keiichi Kimura | Japan | 2:35.39 | Q |
| 5 | 2 | Dmytro Zalevskyy | Ukraine | 2:40.71 | |
| 6 | 7 | Marcin Ryszka | Poland | 2:43.51 | |
| | 1 | Leider Alveiro Lemus Rojas | Colombia | DSQ | |

=== Final ===
Competed at 19:25.

| Rank | Lane | Name | Nationality | Time | Notes |
|---|---|---|---|---|---|
| 1st place, gold medalist(s) | 4 | Yang Bozun | China | 2:22.40 | WR |
| 2nd place, silver medalist(s) | 2 | Viktor Smyrnov | Ukraine | 2:26.45 | EU |
| 3rd place, bronze medalist(s) | 7 | Oleksandr Mashchenko | Ukraine | 2:27.77 | |
| 4 | 5 | Israel Oliver | Spain | 2:27.79 | |
| 5 | 8 | Enhamed Enhamed | Spain | 2:28.85 | |
| 6 | 6 | Bradley Snyder | United States | 2:29.80 | |
| 7 | 3 | Donovan Tildesley | Canada | 2:30.22 | |
| 8 | 1 | Keiichi Kimura | Japan | 2:31.74 | |

'Q = qualified for final. WR = World Record. EU = European Record. AS = Asian Record. DSQ = Disqualified.
