= Swimming at the 2012 Summer Paralympics – Men's 400 metre freestyle S11 =

Event at the 2012 Summer Paralympics

Men's 400m Freestyle S11 at the XIV Paralympic Games
- Venue: London Aquatics Centre
- Dates: 7 September 2012
- Competitors: 11 from 9 nations
- Winning time: 4:32.41

Medalists
1st place, gold medalist(s)		Bradley Snyder	United States
2nd place, silver medalist(s)		Enhamed Enhamed	Spain
3rd place, bronze medalist(s)		Yang Bozun	China

The men's 400m freestyle S11 event at the 2012 Summer Paralympics took place at the London Aquatics Centre on 7 September. There were two heats; the swimmers with the eight fastest times advanced to the final.

== Results ==
=== Heats ===
Competed from 09:47.

==== Heat 1 ====
Rank	Lane	Name	Nationality	Time	Notes
1	3	Yang Bozun	China	4:48.03	Q
2	4	Enhamed Enhamed	Spain	4:56.25	Q
3	6	Matheus Souza	Brazil	4:57.32	Q
4	5	Israel Oliver	Spain	4:58.41	Q
5	2	Marcin Ryszka	Poland	5:16.68	

==== Heat 2 ====
Rank	Lane	Name	Nationality	Time	Notes
1	4	Bradley Snyder	United States	4:33.70	Q
2	6	Dmytro Zalevskyy	Ukraine	5:00.57	Q
3	5	Viktor Smyrnov	Ukraine	5:01.89	Q
4	3	Hendri Herbst	South Africa	5:08.87	Q, AF
5	2	Sergio Zayas	Argentina	5:15.46	
6	7	Brayan Mauricio Urbano Herrera	Colombia	5:35.03	

=== Final ===
Competed at 17:44.

Rank	Lane	Name	Nationality	Time	Notes
1st place, gold medalist(s)	4	Bradley Snyder	United States	4:32.41	
2nd place, silver medalist(s)	3	Enhamed Enhamed	Spain	4:38.24	EU
3rd place, bronze medalist(s)	5	Yang Bozun	China	4:41.73	AS
4	2	Israel Oliver	Spain	4:48.86	
5	7	Dmytro Zalevskyy	Ukraine	4:53.46	
6	6	Matheus Souza	Brazil	4:58.50	
7	8	Hendri Herbst	South Africa	4:59.51	AF
8	1	Viktor Smyrnov	Ukraine	5:01.06	

Q = qualified for final. EU = European Record. AS = Asian Record. AF = African Record.
