= Swimming at the 2004 Summer Paralympics – Men's 100 metre breaststroke SB11 =

Men's 100m Breaststroke SB11 at the XII Paralympic Games
- Paralympic Swimming
- Venue: Olympic Aquatic Centre
- Dates: 20 September 2004
- Competitors: 10 from 8 nations
- Winning time: 1:10.53

Medalists
1st place, gold medalist(s)		Oleksandr Mashchenko	Ukraine
2nd place, silver medalist(s)		Viktor Smyrnov	Ukraine
3rd place, bronze medalist(s)		Panom Lagsanaprim	Thailand

The Men's 100 metre breaststroke SB11 swimming event at the 2004 Summer Paralympics was competed on 20 September. It was won by Oleksandr Mashchenko, representing Ukraine.

== 1st round ==
Qualified for next round

Heat 1

20 Sept. 2004, morning session

Rank	Athlete	Time	Notes
1	Viktor Smyrnov (UKR)	1:18.20	
2	Guo Yang (CHN)	1:22.95	
3	Adonis Leon (CUB)	1:24.57	
4	Rodrigo Ribeiro (BRA)	1:27.65	
5	Gustavo Mujica (VEN)	1:34.52	

Heat 2

20 Sept. 2004, morning session

Rank	Athlete	Time	Notes
1	Oleksandr Mashchenko (UKR)	1:13.23	
2	Panom Lagsanaprim (THA)	1:21.60	
3	Prasit Marnnok (THA)	1:25.19	
4	Damian Pietrasik (POL)	1:30.01	
5	Miguel Deniz (ESP)	1:32.25	

== Final round ==
20 Sept. 2004, evening session

Rank	Athlete	Time	Notes
1st place, gold medalist(s)	Oleksandr Mashchenko (UKR)	1:10.53	WR
2nd place, silver medalist(s)	Viktor Smyrnov (UKR)	1:17.98	
3rd place, bronze medalist(s)	Panom Lagsanaprim (THA)	1:21.05	
4	Prasit Marnnok (THA)	1:23.12	
5	Guo Yang (CHN)	1:24.03	
6	Adonis Leon (CUB)	1:24.19	
7	Rodrigo Ribeiro (BRA)	1:28.56	
	Damian Pietrasik (POL)	DSQ	
