= Poland at the 2008 Summer Paralympics =

- IPC code: POL
- NPC: Polish Paralympic Committee
- Website: www.paralympic.org.pl

in Beijing
- Competitors: 91 in 11 sports
- Flag bearer: Krzysztof Smorszczewski
- Medals Ranked 18th: Gold 5 Silver 12 Bronze 13 Total 30

Summer Paralympics appearances (overview)
- 1972; 1976; 1980; 1984; 1988; 1992; 1996; 2000; 2004; 2008; 2012; 2016; 2020; 2024

Poland competed at the 2008 Summer Paralympics in Beijing. The country's delegation included 91 athletes.

Natalia Partyka, who represented Poland in table tennis, also competed at the 2008 Summer Olympics. She was one of only two athletes competing at both the Beijing Paralympics and the Beijing Olympics, the other being South Africa's Natalie du Toit in swimming.

== Medallists ==
Medal	Name	Sport	Event
Gold	Marcin Awiżeń	Athletics	Men's 800m T46
Gold	Andrzej Zajac; Dariusz Flak	Cycling	Men's road race B&VI 1-3
Gold	Katarzyna Pawlik	Swimming	Women's 400m freestyle S10
Gold	Joanna Mendak	Swimming	Women's 100m butterfly S12
Gold	Natalia Partyka	Table tennis	Women's singles class 10
Silver	Paweł Piotrowski	Athletics	Men's javelin throw F35-36
Silver	Tomasz Blatkiewicz	Athletics	Men's shot put F37-38
Silver	Krzysztof Smorszczewski	Athletics	Men's shot put F55-56
Silver	Alicja Fiodorow	Athletics	Women's 200m T46
Silver	Justyna Kozdryk	Powerlifting	Women's 44kg
Silver	Damian Pietrasik	Swimming	Men's 100m backstroke S11
Silver	Katarzyna Pawlik	Swimming	Women's 50m freestyle S10
Silver	Katarzyna Pawlik	Swimming	Women's 100m freestyle S10
Silver	Paulina Woźniak	Swimming	Women's 100m breaststroke SB8
Silver	Joanna Mendak	Swimming	Women's 200m individual medley SM12
Silver	Piotr Grudzien	Table tennis	Men's singles class 8
Silver	Malgorzata Grzelak; Natalia Partyka	Table tennis	Women's team class 6-10
Bronze	Mirosław Pych	Athletics	Men's javelin throw F11-12
Bronze	Paweł Piotrowski	Athletics	Men's shot put F35-36
Bronze	Alicja Fiodorow	Athletics	Women's 100m T46
Bronze	Ewa Zielińska	Athletics	Women's long jump F42
Bronze	Renata Chilewska	Athletics	Women's javelin throw F35-38
Bronze	Renata Chilewska	Athletics	Women's shot put F35-36
Bronze	Krzysztof Kosikowski; Artur Korc	Cycling	Men's time trial B&VI 1-3
Bronze	Ryszard Rogala	Powerlifting	Men's 90kg
Bronze	Grzegorz Polkowski	Swimming	Men's 100m freestyle S11
Bronze	Joanna Mendak	Swimming	Women's 100m freestyle S12
Bronze	Katarzyna Pawlik	Swimming	Women's 200m individual medley SM10
Bronze	Radoslaw Stanczuk	Wheelchair fencing	Men's épée A
Bronze	Dariusz Pender	Wheelchair fencing	Men's foil A

== Sports ==
=== Archery ===
==== Men ====
Athlete	Event	Ranking round		Round of 32	Round of 16	Quarterfinals	Semifinals	Finals	
Athlete	Event	Score	Seed	Opposition score	Opposition score	Opposition score	Opposition score	Opposition score	Rank
Tomasz Leżański	Men's individual recurve standing	596	14	A Sanchez (ESP); W 97-88	Dong Z (CHN); L 102-108	did not advance			
Ryszard Olejnik	Men's individual recurve standing	550	21	Inkaew (THA); L 89-102	did not advance				
Janusz Bułyk	Men's individual recurve W1/W2	549	28	Cheng C (CHN); L 88-104	did not advance				
Piotr Sawicki	Men's individual recurve W1/W2	593	15	Phimthong (THA); W 104-89	Kim H K (KOR); W 104-99	Vitale (ITA); L 98-102	did not advance		
Tomasz Leżański; Ryszard Olejnik; Piotr Sawicki	Men's team	1739	6	—N/a		China (CHN); L 191-202	did not advance		

==== Women ====
Athlete	Event	Ranking round		Round of 32	Round of 16	Quarterfinals	Semifinals	Finals	
Athlete	Event	Score	Seed	Opposition score	Opposition score	Opposition score	Opposition score	Opposition score	Rank
Alicja Bukańska	Women's individual recurve standing	533	17	Yan H (CHN); L 96-98	did not advance				
Małgorzata Olejnik	Women's individual recurve standing	541	11	Bye	Kim R S (KOR); W 98-85	Duboc (FRA); W 101-88	Gao F (CHN); L 85-98	Carmichael (USA); L 101-105	4
Wiesława Wolak	Women's individual recurve standing	513	19	Nikitenko (UKR); L 79-82	did not advance				
Alicja Bukańska; Małgorzata Olejnik; Wiesława Wolak	Women's team recurve	1587	5	—N/a		Ukraine (UKR); W 166-162	China (CHN); L 178-194	Czech Republic (CZE); L 182-184	4

=== Athletics ===
==== Men's track ====
Athlete	Class	Event	Heats		Semifinal		Final	
Athlete	Class	Event	Result	Rank	Result	Rank	Result	Rank
Marcin Awiżeń	T46	800m	1:59.38	5 Q	—N/a		1:52.36 WR	1st place, gold medalist(s)
Marcin Awiżeń	T46	1500m	4:09.57	6 Q	—N/a		3:54.24	4
Tomasz Chmurzyński	T12	Marathon	—N/a				2:39.41	10
Wojciech Gołaski	T46	800m	2:30.06	9 q	—N/a		DNF	
Wojciech Gołaski	T46	1500m	4:13.83	17	did not advance			
Tomasz Hamerlak	T54	1500m	3:07.10	2 Q	3:01.71	3 q	3:17.60	6
Tomasz Hamerlak	T54	5000m	10:16.03	8 q	—N/a		10:25.67	8
Tomasz Hamerlak	T54	Marathon	—N/a				1:30:31	22
Mateusz Michalski	T12	100m	11.20	6 q	11.31	9	did not advance	
Mateusz Michalski	T12	200m	22.72	6 q	22.60	7 B	22.75	8
Marcin Mielczarek	T36	100m	—N/a				12.42	5
Marcin Mielczarek	T36	200m	—N/a				25.46	4
Robert Plichta	T36	800m	—N/a				2:27.89	8
Jakub Rega	T36	800m	—N/a				2:23.70	7
Robert Rumanowski	T12	400m	51.67	10	did not advance			
Robert Rumanowski	T12	800m	1:57.89	6	did not advance			
Mariusz Tubielewicz	T37	800m	—N/a				2:15.45	7
Daniel Wozniak	T12	200m	23.16	11 q	23.50	10	did not advance	
Daniel Wozniak	T12	400m	51.04	7 q	51.39	7	did not advance	

==== Men's field ====
Athlete	Class	Event	Final		
Athlete	Class	Event	Result	Points	Rank
Tomasz Blatkiewicz	F37-38	Discus throw	49.72	966	5
Tomasz Blatkiewicz	F37-38	Shot put	14.74 SB	980	2nd place, silver medalist(s)
Robert Chyra	F37-38	Discus throw	44.75	869	9
Robert Chyra	F37-38	Shot put	13.01 SB	865	4
Leszek Ćmikiewicz	F42	Discus throw	37.22	-	9
Łukas Kałuziak	F42/44	Javelin throw	49.57	910	8
Karol Kozun	F55-56	Javelin throw	26.69	812	6
Karol Kozun	F55-56	Shot put	9.89	873	13
Łukasz Labuch	F37-38	Long jump	5.42	942	8
Paweł Piotrowski	F35-36	Discus throw	31.75	909	8
Paweł Piotrowski	F35-36	Javelin throw	42.88	1158	2nd place, silver medalist(s)
Paweł Piotrowski	F35-36	Shot put	13.03	1044	3rd place, bronze medalist(s)
Mirosław Pych	F11-12	Javelin throw	56.01	989	3rd place, bronze medalist(s)
Janusz Rokicki	F57-58	Shot put	15.29	1022	4
Krzysztof Smorszczewski	F55-56	Shot put	11.95	1030	2nd place, silver medalist(s)

==== Women's track ====
Athlete	Class	Event	Heats		Final	
Athlete	Class	Event	Result	Rank	Result	Rank
Alicja Fiodorow	T46	100m	12.60	2 Q	12.66	3rd place, bronze medalist(s)
Alicja Fiodorow	T46	200m	26.47	6 Q	25.96	2nd place, silver medalist(s)
Natalia Jasińska	T37	100m	15.17	9	did not advance	
Natalia Jasińska	T37	200m	32.01	11	did not advance	
Marta Langner	T37	100m	15.04	8 Q	14.94	5
Marta Langner	T37	200m	31.18	6 Q	31.25	7
Anna Mayer	T46	100m	12.88	7 Q	12.78	6
Anna Mayer	T46	200m	26.63	7 q	26.48	6
Katarzyna Piekart	T46	100m	13.20	10	did not advance	
Ewa Zielinska	T42	100m	—N/a		17.89	4

==== Women's field ====
Athlete	Class	Event	Final		
Athlete	Class	Event	Result	Points	Rank
Renata Chilewska	F35-36	Discus throw	23.81	991	4
Renata Chilewska	F35-36	Javelin throw	25.59	1161	3rd place, bronze medalist(s)
Renata Chilewska	F35-36	Shot put	9.26	992	3rd place, bronze medalist(s)
Katarzyna Piekart	F42-46	Javelin throw	29.47	805	10
Anna Raszczuk	F37-38	Discus throw	24.40 SB	824	11
Anna Raszczuk	F37-38	Shot put	9.82	860	14
Ewa Zielinska	F42	Long jump	3.62 SB	-	3rd place, bronze medalist(s)

=== Cycling ===
==== Men's road ====
Athlete	Event	Time	Rank
Krzysztof Kosikowski; Artur Korc (pilot)	Men's road race B&VI 1-3	2:17.53	5
Krzysztof Kosikowski; Artur Korc (pilot)	Men's road time trial B&VI 1-3	32:50.31	3rd place, bronze medalist(s)
Andrzej Zając; Dariusz Flak (pilot)	Men's road race B&VI 1-3	2:14:44	1st place, gold medalist(s)
Andrzej Zając; Dariusz Flak (pilot)	Men's road time trial B&VI 1-3	33:37.42	10

==== Women's road ====
Athlete	Event	Time	Rank
Ewa Wisniewska; Wioleta Ostrowska	Women's road race B&VI 1-3	2:01:20	5
Ewa Wisniewska; Wioleta Ostrowska	Women's road time trial B&VI 1-3	41:09.77	9

=== Equestrian ===
Athlete	Horse	Event	Total	
Athlete	Horse	Event	Score	Rank
Patrycja Gepner	Romeo	Mixed individual championship test grade IV	56.968	13
Patrycja Gepner	Romeo	Mixed individual freestyle test grade IV	56.819	14

=== Powerlifting ===
==== Men ====
Athlete	Event	Result	Rank
Damian Kulig	100kg	222.5	5
Rafał Roch	48kg	150.0	6
Ryszard Rogala	90kg	215.0	3rd place, bronze medalist(s)
Sławomir Szymański	52kg	150.0	6
Piotr Szymeczek	75kg	180.0	10
Mariusz Tomczyk	60kg	170.0	4

==== Women ====
Athlete	Event	Result	Rank
Justyna Kozdryk	44kg	92.5	2nd place, silver medalist(s)
Marzena Lazarz	60kg	82.5	6
Emilia Lipowska	40kg	70.0	7
Kamilla Rusielewicz	+82.5kg	115.0	6

=== Rowing ===
Athlete	Event	Heats		Repechage		Final	
Athlete	Event	Time	Rank	Time	Rank	Time	Rank
Martyna Snopek	Women's single sculls	6:05.13	4 R	7:00.71	5 FB	DNS	
Piotr Majka; Jolanta Pawlak	Mixed double sculls	4:29.14	7 R	4:37.90	2 FA	4:35.08	6

=== Shooting ===
==== Men ====
Athlete	Event	Qualification		Final		
Athlete	Event	Score	Rank	Score	Total	Rank
Waldemar Andruszkiewicz	Men's 10m air rifle standing SH1	563	26	did not advance		
Waldemar Andruszkiewicz	Mixed 10m air rifle prone SH1	598	16	did not advance		
Waldemar Andruszkiewicz	Mixed 50m rifle prone SH1	583	17	did not advance		
Wojciech Kosowski	Men's 10m air pistol SH1	556	19	did not advance		
Sławomir Okoniewski	Men's 10m air pistol SH1	551	24	did not advance		
Filip Rodzik	Men's 10m air pistol SH1	544	30	did not advance		

==== Women ====
Athlete	Event	Qualification		Final		
Athlete	Event	Score	Rank	Score	Total	Rank
Jolanta Szulc	Women's 50m rifle 3 positions SH1	543	14	did not advance		
Jolanta Szulc	Mixed 10m air rifle prone SH1	599	10	did not advance		
Jolanta Szulc	Mixed 50m rifle prone SH1	565	40	did not advance		

=== Swimming ===
==== Men ====
Athlete	Class	Event	Heats		Final	
Athlete	Class	Event	Result	Rank	Result	Rank
Mateusz Michalski	S6	100m backstroke	1:21.80	3 Q	1:21.69	4
Mateusz Michalski	S6	50m butterfly	36.07	7 Q	35.20	7
Mateusz Michalski	SM6	200m individual medley	3:12.83	10	did not advance	
Robert Musiorski	S12	50m freestyle	27.41	12	did not advance	
Robert Musiorski	S12	100m freestyle	1:00.90	12	did not advance	
Robert Musiorski	SB12	100m breaststroke	1:14.79	5 Q	1:15.39	7
Krzysztof Paterka	SB8	100m breaststroke	1:15.80	4 Q	1:14.24	4
Damian Pietrasik	S11	100m backstroke	1:10.21	2 Q	1:08.81	2nd place, silver medalist(s)
Damian Pietrasik	S11	50m freestyle	28.56	11	did not advance	
Damian Pietrasik	S11	100m freestyle	1:04.51	10	did not advance	
Grzegorz Polkowski	S11	100m backstroke	1:20.01	11	did not advance	
Grzegorz Polkowski	S11	50m freestyle	28.18	7 Q	27.83	6
Grzegorz Polkowski	S11	100m freestyle	1:01.23	3 Q	1:00.49	3rd place, bronze medalist(s)
Grzegorz Polkowski	S11	400m freestyle	5:33.88	12	did not advance	
Marcin Ryszka	S11	100m butterfly	DSQ		did not advance	
Marcin Ryszka	S11	50m freestyle	29.38	15	did not advance	
Marcin Ryszka	S11	100m freestyle	1:06.91	14	did not advance	
Marcin Ryszka	SB11	100m breaststroke	1:22.78	10	did not advance	

==== Women ====
Athlete	Class	Event	Heats		Final	
Athlete	Class	Event	Result	Rank	Result	Rank
Karolina Hamer	S4	50m freestyle	—N/a		58.46	6
Karolina Hamer	S4	100m freestyle	2:05.65	7 Q	1:59.28	5
Karolina Hamer	SM4	150m individual medley	—N/a		DSQ	
Patrycja Harajda	S12	100m butterfly	1:15.87	5 Q	1:15.22	7
Patrycja Harajda	S12	50m freestyle	30.69	9	did not advance	
Patrycja Harajda	S12	100m freestyle	1:08.74	9	did not advance	
Patrycja Harajda	SB12	100m breaststroke	1:27.57	8 Q	1:28.81	8
Patrycja Harajda	SM12	200m individual medley	2:43.07	4 Q	2:40.37	6
Joanna Mendak	S12	100m butterfly	1:06.28	1 Q	1:03.34 PR	1st place, gold medalist(s)
Joanna Mendak	S12	50m freestyle	29.14	6 Q	28.34	4
Joanna Mendak	S12	100m freestyle	1:04.24	5 Q	1:01.57	3rd place, bronze medalist(s)
Joanna Mendak	SB12	100m breaststroke	1:25.81	7 Q	1:24.54	7
Joanna Mendak	SM12	200m individual medley	2:39.91	2 Q	2:32.65	2nd place, silver medalist(s)
Anna Omielan	S10	100m backstroke	1:20.85	14	did not advance	
Anna Omielan	S10	100m butterfly	1:20.25	9	did not advance	
Anna Omielan	S10	100m freestyle	1:08.15	12	did not advance	
Anna Omielan	S10	400m freestyle	5:07.12	9	did not advance	
Anna Omielan	SM10	200m individual medley	DSQ		did not advance	
Katarzyna Pawlik	S10	100m backstroke	1:17.08	8 Q	1:20.08	8
Katarzyna Pawlik	S10	100m butterfly	1:13.59	5 Q	1:12.99	5
Katarzyna Pawlik	S10	50m freestyle	29.31	3 Q	28.92	2nd place, silver medalist(s)
Katarzyna Pawlik	S10	100m freestyle	1:01.60 WR	1 Q	1:01.59	2nd place, silver medalist(s)
Katarzyna Pawlik	S10	400m freestyle	4:46.71	2 Q	4:33.15 WR	1st place, gold medalist(s)
Katarzyna Pawlik	SM10	200m individual medley	2:42.38	3 Q	2:40.41	3rd place, bronze medalist(s)
Paulina Woźniak	S9	100m butterfly	1:18.55	16	did not advance	
Paulina Woźniak	S9	100m freestyle	1:10.24	20	did not advance	
Paulina Woźniak	SB8	100m breaststroke	1:25.47	3 Q	1:23.90	2nd place, silver medalist(s)
Paulina Woźniak	SM9	200m individual medley	2:45.33	7 Q	2:46.14	7

=== Table tennis ===
==== Men ====
Athlete	Event	Preliminaries				Round of 16	Quarterfinals	Semifinals	Final / BM	
Athlete	Event	Opposition Result	Opposition Result	Opposition Result	Rank	Opposition Result	Opposition Result	Opposition Result	Opposition Result	Rank
Piotr Grudzień	Men's singles C8	Loicq (BEL); W 3-0	Hu M F (TPE); L 1-3	Pichon (FRA); W 3-1	1 Q	—N/a		Jambor (SVK); W 3-0	Chen G (CHN); L 1-3	2nd place, silver medalist(s)
Adam Jurasz	Men's singles C7	Seidenfeld (USA); W 3-1	Messi (FRA); L 0-3	J du Plooy (RSA); W 3-1	3	did not advance				
Mirosław Kowalski	Men's singles C6	Wetherill (GBR); W 3–2	Schmidt (GER); L 0–3	Michell (BRA); W 3–1	3	did not advance				
Sebastian Powroźniak	Men's singles C9-10	Fraczyk (AUT); L 2-3	Cieslar (CZE); W 3-1	—N/a	2	did not advance				
Marcon Skrzynecki	Men's singles C8	Chen G (CHN); L 0-3	Csonka (HUN); L 1-3	Vergeylen (BEL); W 3-1	3	did not advance				
Piotr Grudzień; Adam Jurasz; Mirosław Kowalski; Marcin Skrzynecki	Men's team C6-8	—N/a				Denmark (DEN); W 3-1	France (FRA); L 1-3	did not advance		

==== Women ====
Athlete	Event	Preliminaries				Round of 16	Quarterfinals	Semifinals	Final / BM	
Athlete	Event	Opposition Result	Opposition Result	Opposition Result	Rank	Opposition Result	Opposition Result	Opposition Result	Opposition Result	Rank
Barbara Barszcz	Women's singles C5	Zimmerer (GER); L 0-3	Zhang B (CHN); L 1-3	Chan S L (HKG); L 0-3	4	did not advance				
Małgorzata Grzelak	Women's singles C9	Liu M (CHN); L 0-3	Komleva (RUS); W 3-1	Lazzaro (AUS); W 3-0	2 Q	—N/a		Lei L (CHN); L 0-3	Kavas (TUR); L 0-3	4
Natalia Partyka	Women's singles C10	Hou C (CHN); W 3-0	Li Y (CHN); W 3-0	le Morvan (FRA); W 3-0	1 Q	—N/a		la Bourdonnaye (CZE); W 3-0	Fan L (CHN); W 3-0	1st place, gold medalist(s)
Katarzyna Pitry	Women's singles C6-7	van Zon (NED); L 0-3	Julian (AUS); W 3-0	—N/a	2	did not advance				
Mirosława Roźmiej	Women's singles C4	Perić (SRB); L 0–3	Al-Azzam (JOR); L 1–3	Dolinar (SLO); L 2–3	4	did not advance				
Barbara Barszcz; Mirosława Roźmiej	Women's team C4-5	—N/a				Sweden (SWE); L 1-3	did not advance			
Małgorzata Grzelak; Natalia Partyka	Women's team C6-10	—N/a				Bye	Czech Republic (CZE); W 3-0	Russia (RUS); W 3-0	China (CHN); L 1-3	2nd place, silver medalist(s)

=== Wheelchair fencing ===
==== Men ====
Athlete	Event	Qualification			Round of 16	Quarterfinal	Semifinal	Final / BM	
Athlete	Event	Opposition	Score	Rank	Opposition Score	Opposition Score	Opposition Score	Opposition Score	Rank
Piotr Czop	Men's foil B	Francois (FRA)	L 2-5	2 Q	Rodgers (USA); L 11-15	did not advance			
Piotr Czop	Men's foil B	Datsko (UKR)	W 5-1	2 Q	Rodgers (USA); L 11-15	did not advance			
Piotr Czop	Men's foil B	Rodgers (USA)	W 5-2	2 Q	Rodgers (USA); L 11-15	did not advance			
Piotr Czop	Men's foil B	Alsaedi (KUW)	W 5-3	2 Q	Rodgers (USA); L 11-15	did not advance			
Piotr Czop	Men's foil B	Fawcett (GBR)	L 4-5	2 Q	Rodgers (USA); L 11-15	did not advance			
Piotr Czop	Men's sabre B	Cratere (FRA)	L 3-5	5	did not advance				
Piotr Czop	Men's sabre B	Bogdos (GRE)	L 3-5	5	did not advance				
Piotr Czop	Men's sabre B	Datsko (UKR)	L 2-5	5	did not advance				
Piotr Czop	Men's sabre B	Sarri (ITA)	L 3-5	5	did not advance				
Piotr Czop	Men's sabre B	Williams (USA)	W 5-3	5	did not advance				
Stefan Makowski	Men's foil A	Ye R (CHN)	L 1-5	4 Q	Pellegrini (ITA); L 10-15	did not advance			
Stefan Makowski	Men's foil A	Chan W K (HKG)	L 1-5	4 Q	Pellegrini (ITA); L 10-15	did not advance			
Stefan Makowski	Men's foil A	Bazhukov (UKR)	W 5-3	4 Q	Pellegrini (ITA); L 10-15	did not advance			
Stefan Makowski	Men's foil A	Frolov (RUS)	W 5-4	4 Q	Pellegrini (ITA); L 10-15	did not advance			
Stefan Makowski	Men's foil A	Calhoun (USA)	L 4-5	4 Q	Pellegrini (ITA); L 10-15	did not advance			
Stefan Makowski	Men's sabre A	Pellegrini (ITA)	L 4-5	3 Q	Frolov (RUS); L 10-15	did not advance			
Stefan Makowski	Men's sabre A	More (FRA)	W 5-2	3 Q	Frolov (RUS); L 10-15	did not advance			
Stefan Makowski	Men's sabre A	Calhoun (USA)	W 5-4	3 Q	Frolov (RUS); L 10-15	did not advance			
Stefan Makowski	Men's sabre A	Frolov (RUS)	L 4-5	3 Q	Frolov (RUS); L 10-15	did not advance			
Stefan Makowski	Men's sabre A	L Sanchez (ESP)	W 5-3	3 Q	Frolov (RUS); L 10-15	did not advance			
Stefan Makowski	Men's sabre A	Altabbakh (KUW)	W 5-3	3 Q	Frolov (RUS); L 10-15	did not advance			
Dariusz Pender	Men's épée A	Zhang L (CHN)	L 4–5	3 Q	Citerne (FRA); L 15–13	did not advance			
Dariusz Pender	Men's épée A	Citerne (FRA)	L 2-5	3 Q	Citerne (FRA); L 15–13	did not advance			
Dariusz Pender	Men's épée A	Bazhukov (UKR)	W 5-3	3 Q	Citerne (FRA); L 15–13	did not advance			
Dariusz Pender	Men's épée A	Granell (ESP)	W 5-1	3 Q	Citerne (FRA); L 15–13	did not advance			
Dariusz Pender	Men's épée A	Andree (GER)	W 5-2	3 Q	Citerne (FRA); L 15–13	did not advance			
Dariusz Pender	Men's foil A	Pellegrini (ITA)	W 5-2	1 Q	Alhaddad (KUW); W 15-6	Pellegrini (ITA); W 15-9	Ye R (CHN); L 4-15	Chan W K (HKG); W 15-9	3rd place, bronze medalist(s)
Dariusz Pender	Men's foil A	Maillard (FRA)	W 5-4	1 Q	Alhaddad (KUW); W 15-6	Pellegrini (ITA); W 15-9	Ye R (CHN); L 4-15	Chan W K (HKG); W 15-9	3rd place, bronze medalist(s)
Dariusz Pender	Men's foil A	Mato (HUN)	W 5-1	1 Q	Alhaddad (KUW); W 15-6	Pellegrini (ITA); W 15-9	Ye R (CHN); L 4-15	Chan W K (HKG); W 15-9	3rd place, bronze medalist(s)
Dariusz Pender	Men's foil A	Alhaddad (KUW)	W 5-3	1 Q	Alhaddad (KUW); W 15-6	Pellegrini (ITA); W 15-9	Ye R (CHN); L 4-15	Chan W K (HKG); W 15-9	3rd place, bronze medalist(s)
Dariusz Pender	Men's foil A	Andreev (RUS)	W 5-0	1 Q	Alhaddad (KUW); W 15-6	Pellegrini (ITA); W 15-9	Ye R (CHN); L 4-15	Chan W K (HKG); W 15-9	3rd place, bronze medalist(s)
Grzegorz Pluta	Men's épée B	Shenkevych (UKR)	L 4-5	6	did not advance				
Grzegorz Pluta	Men's épée B	Bezyazychny (BLR)	L 3-5	6	did not advance				
Grzegorz Pluta	Men's épée B	Kim G H (KOR)	L 3-5	6	did not advance				
Grzegorz Pluta	Men's épée B	Mari (ITA)	L 2-5	6	did not advance				
Grzegorz Pluta	Men's épée B	Ding (CHN)	W 5-4	6	did not advance				
Grzegorz Pluta	Men's sabre B	Mari (ITA)	W 5-3	3 Q	Sarri (ITA); L 14-15	did not advance			
Grzegorz Pluta	Men's sabre B	Hui C H (HKG)	L 1-5	3 Q	Sarri (ITA); L 14-15	did not advance			
Grzegorz Pluta	Men's sabre B	Yusupov (RUS)	L 4-5	3 Q	Sarri (ITA); L 14-15	did not advance			
Grzegorz Pluta	Men's sabre B	Soler (ESP)	W 5-2	3 Q	Sarri (ITA); L 14-15	did not advance			
Grzegorz Pluta	Men's sabre B	Moreno (USA)	W 5-2	3 Q	Sarri (ITA); L 14-15	did not advance			
Radosław Stańczuk	Men's épée A	Tian (CHN)	L 3-5	4 Q	Wong T T (HKG); W 15-11	Betti (ITA); W 15-9	Tian (CHN); L 12-15	Maillard (FRA); W 15-12	3rd place, bronze medalist(s)
Radosław Stańczuk	Men's épée A	Wong T T (HKG)	L 4-5	4 Q	Wong T T (HKG); W 15-11	Betti (ITA); W 15-9	Tian (CHN); L 12-15	Maillard (FRA); W 15-12	3rd place, bronze medalist(s)
Radosław Stańczuk	Men's épée A	Betti (ITA)	W 5-3	4 Q	Wong T T (HKG); W 15-11	Betti (ITA); W 15-9	Tian (CHN); L 12-15	Maillard (FRA); W 15-12	3rd place, bronze medalist(s)
Radosław Stańczuk	Men's épée A	Alqallaf (KUW)	L 3-5	4 Q	Wong T T (HKG); W 15-11	Betti (ITA); W 15-9	Tian (CHN); L 12-15	Maillard (FRA); W 15-12	3rd place, bronze medalist(s)
Radosław Stańczuk	Men's épée A	Horvath (HUN)	W 5-3	4 Q	Wong T T (HKG); W 15-11	Betti (ITA); W 15-9	Tian (CHN); L 12-15	Maillard (FRA); W 15-12	3rd place, bronze medalist(s)
Radosław Stańczuk	Men's sabre A	Ye R (CHN)	L 2-5	2 Q	Mato (HUN); W 15-12	Ye R (CHN); L 9-15	did not advance		
Radosław Stańczuk	Men's sabre A	Mato (HUN)	L 2-5	2 Q	Mato (HUN); W 15-12	Ye R (CHN); L 9-15	did not advance		
Radosław Stańczuk	Men's sabre A	Citerne (FRA)	W 5-3	2 Q	Mato (HUN); W 15-12	Ye R (CHN); L 9-15	did not advance		
Radosław Stańczuk	Men's sabre A	Andreev (RUS)	W 5-4	2 Q	Mato (HUN); W 15-12	Ye R (CHN); L 9-15	did not advance		
Radosław Stańczuk	Men's sabre A	Alexakis (GRE)	W 5-1	2 Q	Mato (HUN); W 15-12	Ye R (CHN); L 9-15	did not advance		
Zbigniew Wyganowski	Men's foil B	Sarri (ITA)	L 3-5	3 Q	Datsko (UKR); L 12-15	did not advance			
Zbigniew Wyganowski	Men's foil B	Latreche (FRA)	W 5-4	3 Q	Datsko (UKR); L 12-15	did not advance			
Zbigniew Wyganowski	Men's foil B	Hisakawa (JPN)	L 4-5	3 Q	Datsko (UKR); L 12-15	did not advance			
Zbigniew Wyganowski	Men's foil B	Yusupov (RUS)	W 5-2	3 Q	Datsko (UKR); L 12-15	did not advance			
Zbigniew Wyganowski	Men's foil B	Bezyazychny (BLR)	W 5-2	3 Q	Datsko (UKR); L 12-15	did not advance			

==== Women ====
Athlete	Event	Qualification			Quarterfinal	Semifinal	Final / BM	
Athlete	Event	Opposition	Score	Rank	Opposition Score	Opposition Score	Opposition Score	Rank
Dagmara Witos-Eze	Women's épée A	Yu C Y (HKG)	L 3–5	3 Q	Yu C Y (HKG); L 6-15	did not advance		
Dagmara Witos-Eze	Women's épée A	Juhasz (HUN)	L 3-5	3 Q	Yu C Y (HKG); L 6-15	did not advance		
Dagmara Witos-Eze	Women's épée A	Halkina (BLR)	L 3-5	3 Q	Yu C Y (HKG); L 6-15	did not advance		
Dagmara Witos-Eze	Women's épée A	Zhang W (CHN)	W 5-3	3 Q	Yu C Y (HKG); L 6-15	did not advance		
Dagmara Witos-Eze	Women's épée A	Poignet (FRA)	W 5-4	3 Q	Yu C Y (HKG); L 6-15	did not advance		
Dagmara Witos-Eze	Women's foil A	Poignet (FRA)	L 2-5	6	did not advance			
Dagmara Witos-Eze	Women's foil A	Fan P S (HKG)	L 3-5	6	did not advance			
Dagmara Witos-Eze	Women's foil A	Krajnyak (HUN)	L 0-5	6	did not advance			
Dagmara Witos-Eze	Women's foil A	Zhang W (CHN)	W 5-3	6	did not advance			
Dagmara Witos-Eze	Women's foil A	Gorlina (UKR)	L 0-5	6	did not advance			

=== Wheelchair tennis ===
==== Men ====
Athlete	Class	Event	Round of 64	Round of 32	Round of 16	Quarterfinals	Semifinals	Finals
Athlete	Class	Event	Opposition Result	Opposition Result	Opposition Result	Opposition Result	Opposition Result	Opposition Result
Albin Batcyki	Open	Men's singles	Mathonsi (RSA); W 6–2, 6–1	Peifer (FRA); L 1-6, 3-6	did not advance			
Piotr Jaroszewski	Open	Men's singles	Wikstrom (SWE); L 1-6, 0-6	did not advance				
Tadeusz Kruszelnicki	Open	Men's singles	Oh (KOR); W 6-2, 6-4	Li B (CHN); W 6-1, 6-4	Saida (JPN); L 2-6, 3-6	did not advance		
Piotr Jaroszewski; Tadeusz Kruszelnicki	Open	Men's doubles	—N/a		Gatelli (ITA) / Mazzei (ITA); W 6-0, 6-0	Scheffers (NED) / Vink (NED); L 0-6, 1-6	did not advance	

==== Women ====
Athlete	Class	Event	Round of 32	Round of 16	Quarterfinals	Semifinals	Finals
Athlete	Class	Event	Opposition Result	Opposition Result	Opposition Result	Opposition Result	Opposition Result
Agnieszka Bartczuk	Open	Women's singles	Krüger (GER); L 6-7, 7-6, 3-6	did not advance			

== See also ==
- Poland at the Paralympics
- Poland at the 2008 Summer Olympics
