= Swimming at the 2008 Summer Paralympics – Women's 400 metre freestyle S10 =

Women's 400m Freestyle S10 at the XIII Paralympic Games
- Venue: Beijing National Aquatics Center
- Dates: 15 September
- Competitors: 9 from 4 nations
- Winning time: 4:33.15

Medalists
1st place, gold medalist(s)		Katarzyna Pawlik	Poland
2nd place, silver medalist(s)		Ashley Owens	United States
3rd place, bronze medalist(s)		Susan Beth Scott	United States

The women's 400m freestyle S10 event at the 2008 Summer Paralympics took place at the Beijing National Aquatics Center on 15 September. There were two heats; the swimmers with the eight fastest times advanced to the final.

== Results ==
=== Heats ===
Competed from 09:13.

==== Heat 1 ====
Rank	Name	Nationality	Time	Notes
1	Katarzyna Pawlik	Poland	4:46.71	Q
2	Samantha Gandolfo	Australia	4:48.90	Q
3	Anna Eames	United States	4:52.77	Q
4	Anna Omielan	Poland	5:07.12	

==== Heat 2 ====
Rank	Name	Nationality	Time	Notes
1	Susan Beth Scott	United States	4:46.16	Q
2	Ashley Owens	United States	4:50.68	Q
3	Elodie Lorandi	France	4:51.46	Q
4	Sian Lucas	Australia	4:52.14	Q
5	Tarryn McGaw	Australia	5:03.42	Q

=== Final ===
Competed at 17:47.

Rank	Name	Nationality	Time	Notes
1st place, gold medalist(s)	Katarzyna Pawlik	Poland	4:33.15	WR
2nd place, silver medalist(s)	Ashley Owens	United States	4:38.11	
3rd place, bronze medalist(s)	Susan Beth Scott	United States	4:39.44	
4	Anna Eames	United States	4:43.98	
5	Samantha Gandolfo	Australia	4:48.02	
6	Elodie Lorandi	France	4:48.47	
7	Tarryn McGaw	Australia	4:49.79	
8	Sian Lucas	Australia	4:49.98	

Q = qualified for final. WR = World Record.
