= Swimming at the 2008 Summer Paralympics – Women's 100 metre butterfly S10 =

Women's 100m Butterfly S10 at the XIII Paralympic Games
- Venue: Beijing National Aquatics Center
- Dates: 8 September
- Competitors: 9 from 7 nations
- Winning time: 1:09.44

Medalists
1st place, gold medalist(s)		Anna Eames	United States
2nd place, silver medalist(s)		Sophie Pascoe	New Zealand
3rd place, bronze medalist(s)		Wang Shuai	China

The women's 100m butterfly S10 event at the 2008 Summer Paralympics took place at the Beijing National Aquatics Center on 8 September. There were two heats; the swimmers with the eight fastest times advanced to the final.

== Results ==
=== Heats ===
Competed from 09:06.

==== Heat 1 ====
Rank	Name	Nationality	Time	Notes
1	Elodie Lorandi	France	1:11.34	Q
2	Sophie Pascoe	New Zealand	1:12.93	Q
3	Susan Beth Scott	United States	1:15.11	Q
4	Shireen Sapiro	South Africa	1:16.02	Q

==== Heat 2 ====
Rank	Name	Nationality	Time	Notes
1	Anna Eames	United States	1:09.26	Q
2	Wang Shuai	China	1:10.49	Q
3	Katarzyna Pawlik	Poland	1:13.59	Q
4	Viera Mikulasikova	Slovakia	1:16.00	Q
5	Anna Omielan	Poland	1:20.25	

=== Final ===
Competed at 17:05.

Rank	Name	Nationality	Time	Notes
1st place, gold medalist(s)	Anna Eames	United States	1:09.44	
2nd place, silver medalist(s)	Sophie Pascoe	New Zealand	1:10.53	
3rd place, bronze medalist(s)	Wang Shuai	China	1:11.27	
4	Elodie Lorandi	France	1:12.03	
5	Katarzyna Pawlik	Poland	1:12.99	
6	Susan Beth Scott	United States	1:15.72	
7	Shireen Sapiro	South Africa	1:17.07	
8	Viera Mikulasikova	Slovakia	1:17.10	

Q = qualified for final.
