= Swimming at the 2008 Summer Paralympics – Women's 150 metre individual medley SM4 =

Women's 150m Individual Medley SM4 at the XIII Paralympic Games
- Venue: Beijing National Aquatics Center
- Dates: 14 September
- Competitors: 7 from 7 nations
- Winning time: 2:47.84

Medalists
| 1st place, gold medalist(s) | | Karina Lauridsen | Denmark |
| 2nd place, silver medalist(s) | | Marayke Jonkers | Australia |
| 3rd place, bronze medalist(s) | | Patricia Valle | Mexico |

The women's 150m individual medley SM4 event at the 2008 Summer Paralympics took place at the Beijing National Aquatics Center on 14 September. There were no heats in this event.

== Final ==
Competed at 17:43.

| Rank | Name | Nationality | Time | Notes |
|---|---|---|---|---|
| 1st place, gold medalist(s) | Karina Lauridsen | Denmark | 2:47.84 | WR |
| 2nd place, silver medalist(s) | Marayke Jonkers | Australia | 3:28.88 | |
| 3rd place, bronze medalist(s) | Patricia Valle | Mexico | 3:29.36 | WR |
| 4 | Aimee Bruder | United States | 3:29.80 | |
| 5 | Jennie Ekstrom | Sweden | 3:55.59 | |
| 6 | Rildene Firmino | Brazil | 4:05.00 | |
| | Karolina Hamer | Poland | | DQ |

WR = World Record. DQ = Disqualified.
