= Swimming at the 2008 Summer Paralympics – Men's 100 metre breaststroke SB11 =

Men's 100m Breaststroke SB11 at the XIII Paralympic Games
- Venue: Beijing National Aquatics Center
- Dates: 8 September
- Competitors: 13 from 10 nations
- Winning time: 1:12.36

Medalists
| 1st place, gold medalist(s) | | Oleksandr Mashchenko | Ukraine |
| 2nd place, silver medalist(s) | | Yang Bozun | China |
| 3rd place, bronze medalist(s) | | Viktor Smyrnov | Ukraine |

The men's 100m breaststroke SB11 event at the 2008 Summer Paralympics took place at the Beijing National Aquatics Center on 8 September. There were two heats; the swimmers with the eight fastest times advanced to the final.

== Results ==
=== Heats ===
Competed from 10:20.

==== Heat 1 ====
| Rank | Name | Nationality | Time | Notes |
|---|---|---|---|---|
| 1 | Oleksandr Mashchenko | Ukraine | 1:16.59 | Q |
| 2 | Keiichi Kimura | Japan | 1:18.27 | Q |
| 3 | Panom Lagsanaprim | Thailand | 1:18.91 | Q |
| 4 | Deng Sanbo | China | 1:21.29 | Q |
| 5 | Prasit Marnnok | Thailand | 1:27.73 | |
| 6 | Thomas Seidling | Austria | 1:30.65 | |

==== Heat 2 ====
| Rank | Name | Nationality | Time | Notes |
|---|---|---|---|---|
| 1 | Yang Bozun | China | 1:13.74 | Q |
| 2 | Christian Bundgaard | Denmark | 1:17.37 | Q |
| 3 | Viktor Smyrnov | Ukraine | 1:18.24 | Q |
| 4 | Adonis Leon | Cuba | 1:22.40 | Q |
| 5 | Rustam Nurmukhametov | Russia | 1:22.74 | |
| 6 | Marcin Ryszka | Poland | 1:22.78 | |
| 7 | Rodrigo Ribeiro | Brazil | 1:28.02 | |

=== Final ===
Competed at 19:07.

| Rank | Name | Nationality | Time | Notes |
|---|---|---|---|---|
| 1st place, gold medalist(s) | Oleksandr Mashchenko | Ukraine | 1:12.36 | |
| 2nd place, silver medalist(s) | Yang Bozun | China | 1:12.86 | |
| 3rd place, bronze medalist(s) | Viktor Smyrnov | Ukraine | 1:14.70 | |
| 4 | Christian Bundgaard | Denmark | 1:16.38 | |
| 5 | Keiichi Kimura | Japan | 1:17.25 | |
| 6 | Deng Sanbo | China | 1:18.81 | |
| 7 | Panom Lagsanaprim | Thailand | 1:21.13 | |
| 8 | Adonis Leon | Cuba | 1:22.74 | |

Q = qualified for final.
