= Yang Bozun =

Chinese Paralympic swimmer

Personal information
- Nationality: Chinese
- Born: 23 March 1986 (age 40)

Sport
- Sport: Paralympic swimming
- Disability class: S11
Medal record
Representing China
Men's Paralympic swimming
Paralympic Games
Gold medal – first place	2008 Beijing	100 m backstroke S11
Gold medal – first place	2012 London	50 m freestyle S11
Gold medal – first place	2012 London	100 m breaststroke SB11
Gold medal – first place	2012 London	200 m ind. medley SM11
Gold medal – first place	2016 Rio de Janeiro	100 m breaststroke S11
Silver medal – second place	2008 Beijing	100 m breaststroke SB11
Silver medal – second place	2008 Beijing	100 m freestyle S11
Silver medal – second place	2008 Beijing	400 m freestyle S11
Silver medal – second place	2012 London	100 m freestyle S11
Silver medal – second place	2012 London	100 m backstroke S11
Silver medal – second place	2016 Rio de Janeiro	100 m freestyle S11
Silver medal – second place	2024 Paris	100 m breaststroke SB11
Bronze medal – third place	2012 London	400 m freestyle S11
Bronze medal – third place	2016 Rio de Janeiro	50 m freestyle S11
Bronze medal – third place	2016 Rio de Janeiro	200 m ind. medley SM11
Bronze medal – third place	2020 Tokyo	100 m backstroke S11
Bronze medal – third place	2020 Tokyo	100 m breaststroke SB11
World Championships
Gold medal – first place	2006 Durban	100 m breaststroke SB11
Gold medal – first place	2010 Eindhoven	100 m backstroke S11
Gold medal – first place	2019 London	100 m breaststroke SB11
Silver medal – second place	2006 Durban	200 m ind. medley SM11
Silver medal – second place	2010 Eindhoven	50 m freestyle S11
Silver medal – second place	2010 Eindhoven	100 m freestyle S11
Bronze medal – third place	2006 Durban	400 m freestyle S11
Asian Para Games
Bronze medal – third place	2022 Hangzhou	50 m freestyle S11
Bronze medal – third place	2022 Hangzhou	100 m butterfly S11

Yang Bozun (born March 23, 1986) is a Chinese Paralympic swimmer. At the 2012 Summer Paralympics he won three gold medals, two silver medals and one bronze medal.
