= Anna Eames =

American Paralympic swimmer

Medal record

Women's swimming

Representing United States

Paralympic Games
Silver medal – second place	2012 London	4x100 metre freestyle relay 34 points
Gold medal – first place	2008 Beijing	100 metre butterfly S10
Bronze medal – third place	2012 London	100 metre freestyle S10

IPC World Championships
Gold medal – first place	2010 Eindhoven	4x100m medley relay 34pts
Bronze medal – third place	2010 Eindhoven	100m butterfly S10

Anna Eames (born October 1, 1990 in Robbinsdale, Minnesota) is an American swimmer. She competed at the 2012 Summer Paralympics and the 2008 Summer Paralympics.
