= Damian Pietrasik =

Polish Paralympic swimmer

Personal information
- Born: 26 July 1986 (age 39) Olkusz, Poland

Sport
- Country: Poland
- Sport: Paralympic swimming
Medal record
Paralympic Games
| Silver medal – second place | 2008 Beijing | 100 m backstroke S11 |

Damian Michał Pietrasik (born 26 July 1986 in Olkusz) is a visually impaired Polish Paralympic swimmer competing in S11-classification events. He represented Poland at the 2004 Summer Paralympics in Athens, Greece and at the 2008 Summer Paralympics in Beijing, China. He won the silver medal in the men's 100 metre backstroke S11 event at the 2008 Summer Paralympics.

At the 2009 IPC Swimming European Championships held in Reykjavik, Iceland, he won the gold medal in the men's 50 metre freestyle S11 event and the silver medals in the men's 100 metre backstroke S11 and men's 100 metre freestyle S11 events.
