= S11 (classification) =

Para-swimming classification

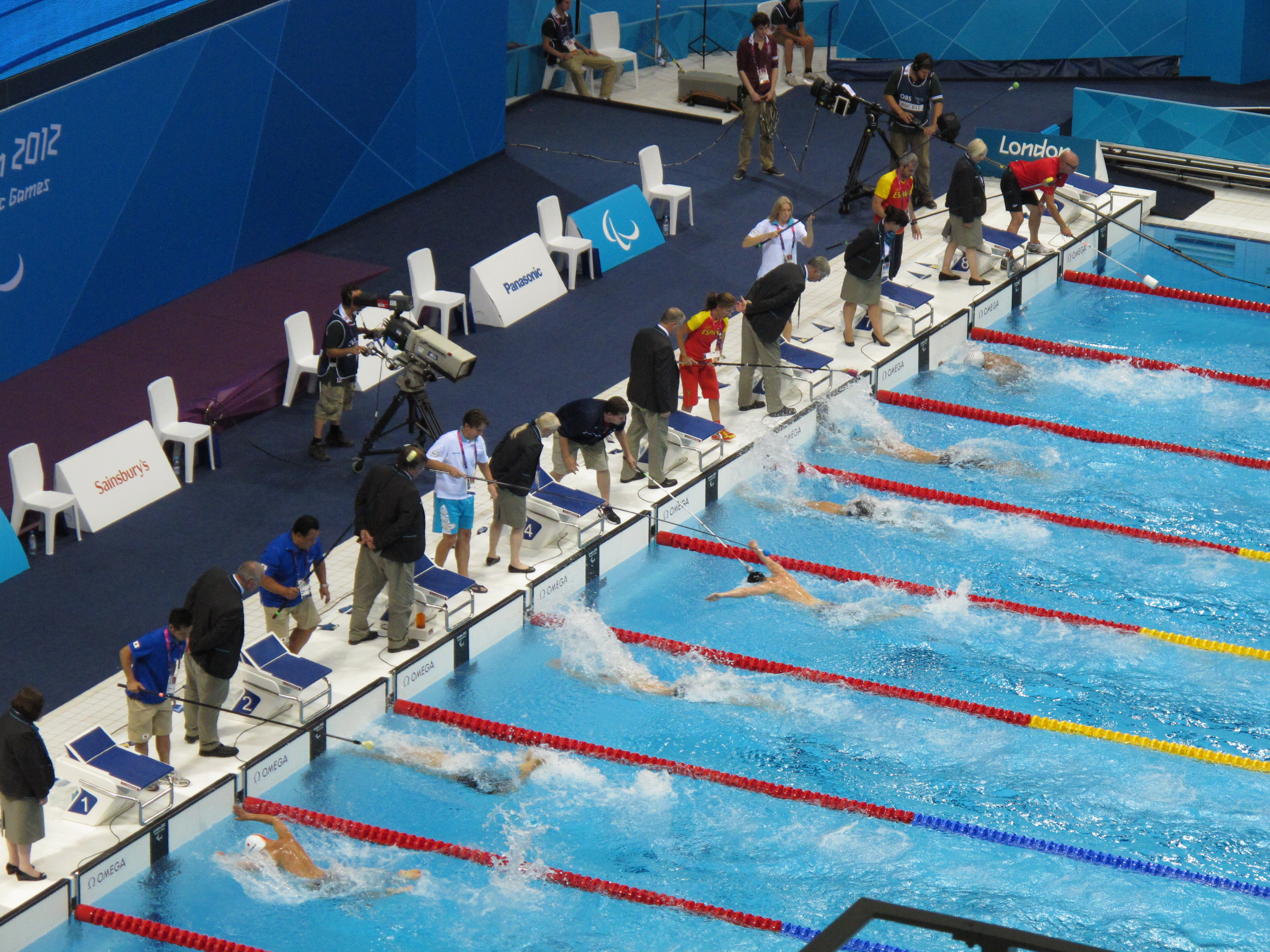
S11 race at the 2012 Paralympics: swimmers being tapped to show they should turn

S11, SB11, SM11 are Para swimming classifications for blind swimmers.

== Sport ==
This classification is for swimming. In the classification title, S represents Freestyle, Backstroke and Butterfly strokes. SB means breaststroke. SM means individual medley. Jane Buckley, writing for the Sporting Wheelies, describes the swimmers in this classification as: "unable to see at all and are considered totally blind (see IBSA B1 – appendix). Swimmers must wear blackened goggles if they swim in this class. They will also require someone to tap them when they are approaching a wall."

== Getting classified ==
Internationally, the classification is done by the International Blind Sports Association. In Australia, to be classified in this category, athletes contact the Australian Paralympic Committee or their state swimming governing body. In the United States, classification is handled by the United States Paralympic Committee on a national level. The classification test has three components: "a bench test, a water test, observation during competition." American swimmers are assessed by four people: a medical classifier, two general classifiers and a technical classifier.

== At the Paralympic Games ==
For the 2016 Summer Paralympics in Rio, the International Paralympic Committee had a zero classification at the Games policy. This policy was put into place in 2014, with the goal of avoiding last minute changes in classes that would negatively impact athlete training preparations. All competitors needed to be internationally classified with their classification status confirmed prior to the Games, with exceptions to this policy being dealt with on a case-by-case basis.

== Competitions ==
For this classification, organisers of the Paralympic Games have the option of including the following events on the Paralympic programme: 50m, 100m and 400m Freestyle, 100m Backstroke, 100m Breaststroke, 100m Butterfly, 200m Individual Medley, and 4 × 100 m Freestyle Relay and 4 × 100 m Medley Relay.

== Records ==
As of February 2013, in the S11 50 m Freestyle Long Course, the men's world record is held by Yang Bozan and the women's world record is held by Cecilia Camellini. In the S11 400 m Freestyle Long Course, the men's world record is held by the American John Morgan and the women's world record is held by the American Anastasia Pagonis.

== Competitors ==
Swimmers who have competed in this classification include Alexander Chekurov, Enhamed Enhamed and Junichi Kawai who all won medals in their class at the 2008 Paralympics.

American swimmers who have been classified by the United States Paralympic Committee as being in this class include Katie Pavlacka, Rio Popper, Julianna Raiche and Rylie Robinson.

== See also ==
- Para swimming classification
- Swimming at the Summer Paralympics
