= Javier Goñi Lopéz =

Spanish Paralympic swimmer

Javier Goñi
Personal information
- Full name: Javier Goñi Lopéz
- Nationality: Spain
- Born: 12 April 1986 (age 40) Madrid, Spain

Sport
- Sport: Swimming
Medal record
Men's swimming
Representing Spain
Paralympic Games
Silver medal – second place	2004 Athens	100m backstroke S11

Javier Goñi Lopéz (born 12 April 1986 in Madrid) is a vision impaired S11/B1 swimmer from Spain. He competed at the 2004 Summer Paralympics in Athens, Greece, winning a silver medal in the 100 meter backstroke race.
