= Yizhar Cohen =

Israeli Paralympic swimmer

Personal information
- Native name: יזהר כהן
- Born: 12 August 1962

Sport
- Country: Israel
Medal record
Event / 1st / 2nd / 3rd; Paralympic Games / 3 / 2 / 1
Men's para swimming
Representing Israel
Paralympic Games
Gold medal – first place	1988 Seoul	100m freestyle B1
Gold medal – first place	1988 Seoul	50m freestyle B1
Gold medal – first place	1988 Seoul	50m breaststroke B1
Silver medal – second place	1988 Seoul	100m breaststroke B1
Silver medal – second place	1996 Atlanta	50m freestyle B1
Bronze medal – third place	1992 Barcelona	50m freestyle B1
Swimming World Championship
Silver medal – second place	1994 Malta	50m freestyle B1
Bronze medal – third place	1994 Malta	100m freestyle B1
Bronze medal – third place	1994 Malta	100m breaststroke B1
Bronze medal – third place	2002 Argentina	50m freestyle S11

Yizhar Cohen (Hebrew: יזהר כהן; born 12 August 1962), also known as Izhar Cohen, is an Israeli paralympic swimmer.

== Biography ==
Cohen was born in Degania Alef, a kibbutz in northern Israel. In 1985, he was blinded by a land mine while serving with the Israel Defense Forces.

Cohen works as a Shiatsu therapist and is married and father of two.

== Swimming career ==
Following his loss of eyesight, he began practicing disabled sports in athletics and swimming. Since 1987, he has taken part in international competitions, including six Paralympic Games held between 1988 and 2008. Until 2004, he also took part in four world championships and eight European championships.

Cohen swims in breaststroke, butterfly, front crawl and backstroke. In 2008, he focused on freestyle swimming. At the 1987 European Championship in Moscow, he won four gold medals. In the 1988 Summer Paralympics, he won three gold medals and one silver. He won more medals at the 1992 Summer Paralympics (1 bronze) and the 1996 Summer Paralympics (1 silver).

At the 2008 Summer Paralympics, Cohen was the Israeli flag bearer.

== See also ==
- Sports in Israel
