= Philip Scholz =

American Paralympic swimmer (born 1988)

Personal information
- Nationality: American /German Dual Citizenship
- Born: April 12, 1988 (age 38) Munich, Germany
- Height: 6 ft 1 in (185 cm)
- Weight: 192 lb (87 kg)
- Alma mater: Loyola University Maryland

Sport
- Sport: Swimming
- Strokes: 400-meter freestyle 100-meter freestyle
- Club: Three Village Swim Club
- Coach: Barry Roffer, Brian Loeffler Paul Furbeck
Medal record
Men's paralympic swimming (S11)
Representing United States
IPC World Championships
Silver medal – second place	2010 Eindhoven	400m Freestyle S11

Philip Scholz (born April 12, 1988) is an author and a former American Paralympic swimmer. Being completely blind, he is classified in the S11 category of blind swimmers. Originally from Munich, Germany, Scholz came on to the international stage in December 2007 in College Park, Maryland.

== Early life ==
Philip Scholz was born in Munich, Germany, to parents Thomas and Ariane Scholz. At a young age, Philip was diagnosed with Stickler Syndrome, a genetic defect that can cause problems with the ears, eyes, throat, and joints. Philip went blind in his left eye at the age of six due to retinal detachments, brought on directly by Styckler Syndrome.

== Swimming career ==
Philip's first swim team was the Three Village Swim Club (TVSC), coached by Barry Roffer, which he first joined in September 1998. Initially considered a sighted swimmer, he was easily able to fit right in on the team.

After losing his sight, Philip continued swimming and graduated from TVSC in 2007. He then went on to swim for the Loyola Greyhounds Swim Team at Loyola University Maryland under coach Brian Loeffler. While on the team he helped the Greyhounds to 3 straight Men's MAAC Swimming and Diving titles.

Philip's first Paralympic meet was the Georgia Open in Atlanta, Georgia in January 2006.

After becoming an American citizen in November 2007, Philip went on the international stage at the University of Maryland, College Park, where he set several long-course American records in the 50 meter butterfly, the 800 meter freestyle, and the 1500 meter freestyle. Before that, he had also set eight short course American records in Loyola's H2Ounds Invitational swim meet, setting times in the 50 yard freestyle, the 100 yard freestyle, the 200 yard freestyle, the 500 yard freestyle, the 1000 yard freestyle, the 1650 yard freestyle, the 100 yard butterfly, and the 200 yard butterfly.

Philip Scholz represented the United States of America in the 2008 Paralympic Games in China, qualifying in the 50 meter freestyle, the 100 meter freestyle, the 400 meter freestyle, the 100 meter butterfly, and the 100 meter backstroke. He placed 5th overall in the 400 meter freestyle and 8th overall in the 100 meter butterfly.

Since the 2008 Paralympics, Philip has become the American record holder for all short course events (yards), and the American record holder in the 200 meter butterfly, 800 meter freestyle, the 1500 meter freestyle, the 50 meter butterfly, and the 50 meter backstroke. He has also briefly held the world record in the 200 meter butterfly.

In 2008 he was nominated for an ESPY Award, for Best Male Athlete with a Disability ESPY Award. Philip Scholz retired from competitive swimming in August 2012.

=== Writing ===
Philip has been published several times on 101words.org and in Flash Fiction Magazine. He has also self-published several novels and novellas.

=== Bibliography ===
Novels:

- PAR ANGUSTA AD AUGUSTA: Through Trial to Triumph, ISBN 979-8734699256
- Slovo Ne Vorobey: A Word Is Not a Sparrow, ISBN 979-8776002489

Novellas:

- Red Bear, ISBN 979-8748559485
- Hardwick and Carter, ISBN 9798665715360
