= Viktor Smyrnov =

Ukrainian Paralympic swimmer

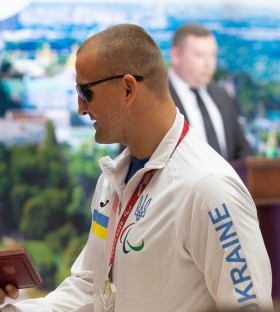
- Smyrnov in 2021

Personal information
- Nationality: Ukrainian
- Born: 2 August 1986 (age 40) Donetsk, Ukrainian SSR, Soviet Union

Sport
- Sport: Swimming
- Strokes: Freestyle, backstroke, butterfly
Medal record
Men's para swimming
Representing Ukraine
Paralympic Games
Gold medal – first place	2004 Athens	100 m backstroke S11
Gold medal – first place	2004 Athens	100 m butterfly S11
Gold medal – first place	2004 Athens	100 m freestyle S11
Gold medal – first place	2004 Athens	200 m individual medley SM11
Gold medal – first place	2004 Athens	400 m freestyle S11
Gold medal – first place	2012 London	100 m butterfly S11
Silver medal – second place	2004 Athens	100 m breaststroke SB11
Silver medal – second place	2012 London	100 m individual medley SM11
Silver medal – second place	2016 Rio de Janeiro	200 m individual medley SM11
Silver medal – second place	2020 Tokyo	100 m backstroke S11
Bronze medal – third place	2004 Athens	50 m freestyle S11
Bronze medal – third place	2008 Beijing	100 m backstroke S11
Bronze medal – third place	2008 Beijing	100 m breaststroke SB11
Bronze medal – third place	2008 Beijing	100 m butterfly S11
Bronze medal – third place	2012 London	100 m backstroke S11
World Championships
Gold medal – first place	2006 Durban	100 m butterfly S11
Gold medal – first place	2006 Durban	100 m backstroke S11
Gold medal – first place	2006 Durban	200 m medley SM11
Gold medal – first place	2006 Durban	400 m freestyle S11
Gold medal – first place	2010 Eindhoven	200 m medley SM11
Gold medal – first place	2010 Eindhoven	100 m breaststroke SB11
Gold medal – first place	2019 London	100 m backstroke S11
Silver medal – second place	2002 Mar del Plata	100 m breaststroke SB11
Silver medal – second place	2006 Durban	100 m breaststroke SB11
Silver medal – second place	2006 Durban	100 m freestyle S11
Silver medal – second place	2006 Durban	50 m freestyle S11
Silver medal – second place	2010 Eindhoven	4x100 m medley 49pts
Silver medal – second place	2010 Eindhoven	100 m butterfly S11
Silver medal – second place	2010 Eindhoven	100 m backstroke S11
Silver medal – second place	2015 Glasgow	100 m backstroke S11
Bronze medal – third place	2002 Mar del Plata	200 m medley SM11
Bronze medal – third place	2002 Mar del Plata	100 m freestyle S11
Bronze medal – third place	2002 Mar del Plata	400 m freestyle S11
Bronze medal – third place	2002 Mar del Plata	100 m butterfly S11
Bronze medal – third place	2010 Eindhoven	400 m freestyle S11
Bronze medal – third place	2019 London	200 m medley SM11
European Championships
Gold medal – first place	2009 Reykjavik	100 m backstroke S11
Gold medal – first place	2009 Reykjavik	100 m butterfly S11
Gold medal – first place	2011 Berlin	100 m backstroke S11
Gold medal – first place	2011 Berlin	200 m individual medley SM11
Gold medal – first place	2018 Dublin	100 m breaststroke SB11
Gold medal – first place	2018 Dublin	400 m freestyle S11
Gold medal – first place	2018 Dublin	100 m backstroke S11
Gold medal – first place	2020 Funchal	100 m butterfly S11
Silver medal – second place	2009 Reykjavik	100 m freestyle S11
Silver medal – second place	2011 Berlin	50 m freestyle S11
Silver medal – second place	2011 Berlin	400 m freestyle S11
Silver medal – second place	2011 Berlin	100 m breaststroke SB11
Silver medal – second place	2014 Eindhoven	50 m breaststroke S11
Silver medal – second place	2014 Eindhoven	100 m backstroke S11
Silver medal – second place	2016 Funchal	400 m freestyle S11
Silver medal – second place	2018 Dublin	100 m butterfly S11
Silver medal – second place	2018 Dublin	200 m individual medley SM11
Silver medal – second place	2020 Funchal	400 m freestyle S11
Silver medal – second place	2020 Funchal	200 m medley SM11
Silver medal – second place	2020 Funchal	100 m breaststroke SB11
Bronze medal – third place	2011 Berlin	100 m butterfly S11
Bronze medal – third place	2011 Berlin	100 m freestyle S11
Bronze medal – third place	2014 Eindhoven	100 m breaststroke SB11
Bronze medal – third place	2014 Eindhoven	200 m individual medley SM11
Bronze medal – third place	2016 Funchal	50 m freestyle S11
Bronze medal – third place	2016 Funchal	100 m backstroke S11
Bronze medal – third place	2016 Funchal	100 m breaststroke SB11
Bronze medal – third place	2016 Funchal	200 m ind. medley SM11
Bronze medal – third place	2018 Dublin	100 m freestyle S11

Viktor Serhiiovych Smyrnov (Ukrainian: Віктор Сергійович Смирнов; born 2 August 1986) is a paralympic swimmer from Ukraine competing mainly in category S11 events.

Viktor has competed at two Paralympic games, winning ten medals, five of them gold. In the 2004 Summer Paralympics he won all of his five golds winning the 100 metres (330 ft) backstroke, butterfly and freestyle, the 200 metres (660 ft) individual medley, and the 400 metres (1,300 ft) freestyle, He also finished second behind countryman Oleksandr Mashchenko who broke the world record in the 100m breaststroke and picked up a bronze in the 50 metres (160 ft) freestyle. The 2008 Summer Paralympics would not prove as profitable in terms of medals for Viktor as he picked up three bronzes, in the 100m backstroke, breaststroke, and butterfly. He was disqualified in the 100m freestyle final, finished fifth in the 50m freestyle and fourth in the 400m freestyle.

== Awards ==
- Hero of Ukraine with the Order of the Golden Star (October 19, 2004)
- Order of Merit 3d class (October 4, 2016)
- Order of Merit 2nd class (September 16, 2021)
- Order for Courage 3d class (October 7, 2008)
- Order for Courage 2nd class (July 4, 2012)
- Order for Courage 1st class (September 17, 2012)
