= Junichi Kawai =

Japanese Paralympic swimmer

Medal record

Swimming

Representing Japan

Paralympic Games
Gold medal – first place	1996 Atlanta	4 x 50 m medley 20pts - B1
Gold medal – first place	1996 Atlanta	100 m freestyle - B1
Gold medal – first place	2000 Sydney	4 x 50 m medley 20pts - S11
Gold medal – first place	2000 Sydney	4x100 m medley - S11-13
Gold medal – first place	2004 Athens	4 x 50 m medley 20pts - S11
Silver medal – second place	1992 Barcelona	4 x 50 m medley 20pts - B1
Silver medal – second place	1992 Barcelona	100 m freestyle - B1
Silver medal – second place	1996 Atlanta	100 m backstroke - B1
Silver medal – second place	2000 Sydney	100 m backstroke - S11
Silver medal – second place	2000 Sydney	100 m freestyle - S11
Silver medal – second place	2000 Sydney	200 m medley - SM11
Silver medal – second place	2004 Athens	100 m butterfly - S11
Silver medal – second place	2004 Athens	100 m freestyle - S11
Silver medal – second place	2008 Beijing	4 x 50 m medley 20pts - S11
Bronze medal – third place	1992 Barcelona	100 m backstroke - B1
Bronze medal – third place	1992 Barcelona	200 m backstroke - B1
Bronze medal – third place	1992 Barcelona	200 m medley - B1
Bronze medal – third place	1996 Atlanta	200 m medley - B1
Bronze medal – third place	2004 Athens	100 m backstroke - S11
Bronze medal – third place	2004 Athens	4 x 100 m freestyle relay 49pts
Bronze medal – third place	2008 Beijing	100 m butterfly - S11

Junichi Kawai (河合 純一, Kawai Jun'ichi) is a Japanese Paralympic swimmer competing mainly in category S11 events.

== Career ==
Junichi has competed in five Summer Paralympics, winning a total of 21 medals, five gold nine silver and seven bronze. His first games came in 1992 when he competed in the 400m freestyle and won bronze in the 100m backstroke, 200m backstroke and 200m Medley and silver in both the 50m and 100m freestyle. In 1996 in Atlanta he competed in the 100m breaststroke and butterfly and won bronze in the 200m Medley, silver in the 100m backstroke and gold in both the 50m and 100m freestyle. In the 2000 Summer Paralympics he defended his 50m freestyle title but slipped to second in the 100m freestyle but also won a gold as part of the Japanese 4 × 100 m medley team and added a further two silver medals in the 100m backstroke and 200m medley. 2004 would see him win his third consecutive gold at the 50m freestyle, he also won silvers in the 100m butterfly and freestyle and bronze in the 100m backstroke and the 4 × 100 m freestyle as well as competing in the 200m medley and 4 × 100 m medley. In his fifth games in 2008 he lost out to Spaniard Enhamed Enhamed in the 50m freestyle, losing for the first time in 4 games in the 50m freestyle he added a bronze in the 100m butterfly as well as competing in the 100m backstroke.

== Awards and honours ==
In 2016, Junichi was inducted into the Paralympic Hall of Fame.
