= Alexander Chekurov =

Russian Paralympic swimmer

Medal record

Swimming

Representing Russia

Paralympic Games
Bronze medal – third place	2008 Beijing	50 metre freestyle - S11

Alexander Chekurov (Russian: Александр Николаевич Чекуров, born 26 May 1974) is a Paralympic swimmer from Russia competing mainly in category S11 events.

Alexander won the bronze medal in the 50m freestyle at the 2008 Summer Paralympics as well as finishing seventh in the 100m freestyle and competing in the heats of the 100m butterfly
