= Miguel Ángel Deniz Mendez =

Spanish swimmer (born 1982)

Personal information
- Nationality: Spain
- Born: 17 November 1982 (age 43) Las Palmas, Canary Islands

Sport
- Sport: Swimming
Medal record
Men's swimming
Representing Spain
Paralympic Games
| Bronze medal – third place | 2000 Sydney | 100m backstroke S11 |
| Bronze medal – third place | 2000 Sydney | 4x100m medley relay S11-13 |
World Championships
| Silver medal – second place | 2002 Mar del Plata | 4x100m medley relay 49pts |
| Bronze medal – third place | 2002 Mar del Plata | 100m backstroke S11 |
| Bronze medal – third place | 2002 Mar del Plata | 100m breaststroke SB11 |

Miguel Ángel Deniz Mendez (born November 17, 1982, in Las Palmas, Canary Islands) is a B1/S11 swimmer from Spain. He competed at the 1996 Summer Paralympics and the 2004 Summer Paralympics where he did not win a medal. He competed at the 2000 Summer Paralympics, winning a bronze medal in the 4 x 100 meter medley Relay 49 Points race and in the 100 meter backstroke event.
