= Oleksandr Mashchenko =

Ukrainian Paralympic swimmer

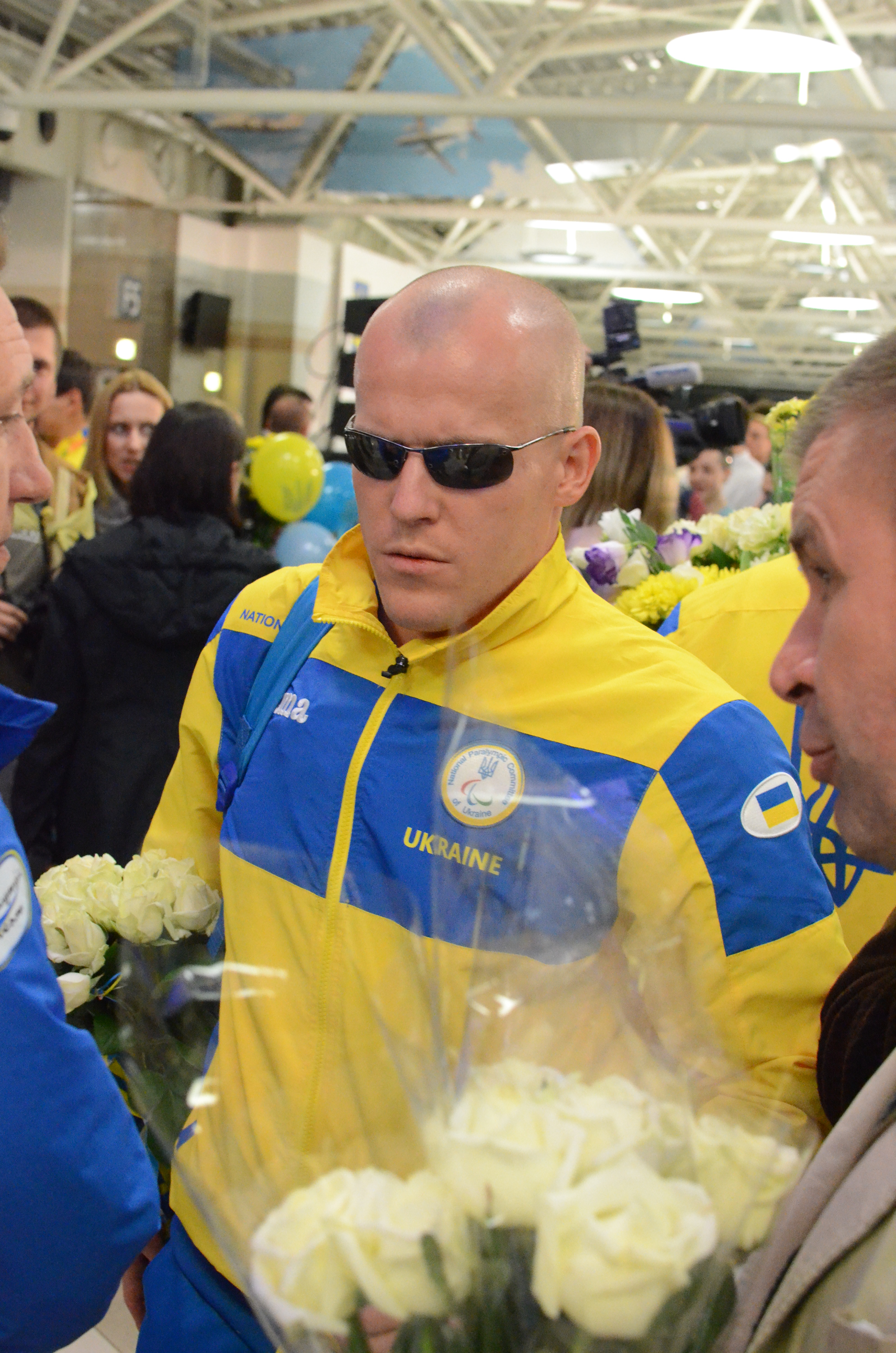

Personal information
- Born: 15 November 1985 (age 40)

Sport
- Sport: Swimming
- Classifications: S11
- Club: Invasport, Donetsk
- Coach: Svitlana Kaznacheyeva
Medal record
Men's swimming
Representing Ukraine
Paralympic Games
Gold medal – first place	2000 Sydney	100 m breaststroke SB11
Gold medal – first place	2004 Athens	100 m breaststroke SB11
Gold medal – first place	2004 Athens	4x100 m medley 49 pts
Gold medal – first place	2008 Beijing	100 m breaststroke SB11
Silver medal – second place	2008 Beijing	100 m butterfly S11
Bronze medal – third place	2004 Athens	200 m ind. medley SM11
IPC World Championships
Gold medal – first place	2002 Mar del Plata	100 m breaststroke SB11
Gold medal – first place	2013 Montreal	100 m butterfly S11
Gold medal – first place	2015 Glasgow	200 m medley SM11
Silver medal – second place	2002 Mar del Plata	200 m medley SM11
Silver medal – second place	2002 Mar del Plata	100 m backstroke S11
Silver medal – second place	2013 Montreal	100 m breaststroke SB11
Silver medal – second place	2013 Montreal	200 m medley SM11
Silver medal – second place	2015 Glasgow	100 m butterfly S11
Bronze medal – third place	2015 Glasgow	100 m breaststroke SB11
IPC European Championships
Gold medal – first place	2014 Eindhoven	100 m breaststroke SB11
Gold medal – first place	2016 Funchal	100 m freestyle S11
Gold medal – first place	2016 Funchal	100 m breaststroke SB11
Silver medal – second place	2016 Funchal	200 m ind. medley SM11
Silver medal – second place	2016 Funchal	50 m freestyle S11

Oleksandr Mashchenko (born 15 November 1985) is a paralympic swimmer from Ukraine who competes in category S11 events and specializes in the breaststroke.

Mashchenko has won the 100m breaststroke at three consecutive Paralympics, first in three Paralympics firstly in 2000, then record time in 2004 and a third time in 2008. At the 2000 games he also competed in the 50m and 100m freestyle where he failed to make the finals, the 200m individual medley finishing sixth and was part of the 4 × 100 m medley team that finished fourth. For the 2004 games the medley team improved enough that Mashchenko was part of the team that broke the world record to win gold, Mashchenko also picked up a bronze in the 200m individual medley, finished eighth in the 50m freestyle, seventh in the 100m backstroke and qualified for the final of the 100m butterfly. In addition to his 100m breaststroke gold in 2008 he also won a silver in the 100m butterfly behind Spaniard Enhamed Enhamed who set a new world record, finished eighth in the 50m freestyle and sixth in the 100m backstroke.
