= Grzegorz Polkowski =

Polish Paralympic swimmer

Personal information
- Born: 31 October 1983 (age 42) Warsaw, Poland

Sport
- Country: Poland
- Sport: Paralympic swimming
- Disability class: S11
Medal record
Paralympic swimming
Representing Poland
Paralympic Games
Silver medal – second place	2004 Athens	50m freestyle S11
Bronze medal – third place	2008 Beijing	100m freestyle S11
World Championships (LC)
Gold medal – first place	2006 Durban	50m freestyle S11
Gold medal – first place	2006 Durban	100m freestyle S11
Silver medal – second place	2002 Mar del Plata	50m freestyle S11
World Championships (SC)
Silver medal – second place	2009 Rio de Janeiro	50m freestyle S11
Bronze medal – third place	2009 Rio de Janeiro	100m freestyle S11

Grzegorz Edward Polkowski (born 31 October 1983) is a former Paralympic swimmer of Poland. At the 2004 Summer Paralympics he won a silver at 50m Freestyle S11 and at the 2008 Summer Paralympics he won a bronze at 100m Freestyle S11.
