= Donovan Tildesley =

Canadian Paralympic swimmer

Personal information
- Nickname: Big D
- Nationality: Canadian
- Born: July 24, 1984 (age 41) Vancouver, British Columbia, Canada
- Height: 166 cm (5.45 ft)
- Weight: 62 kg (137 lb)

Sport
- Sport: Swimming
- Strokes: Medley; Freestyle; Butterfly
- College team: University of British Columbia Dolphins
Medal record
Swimming
Paralympic Games
Silver medal – second place	2004 Athens	400m freestyle S11
Silver medal – second place	2004 Athens	200m individual medley SM11
Bronze medal – third place	2000 Sydney	200m individual medley SM11
Bronze medal – third place	2004 Athens	100m freestyle S11
Bronze medal – third place	2008 Beijing	100m freestyle S11
Parapan American Games
Gold medal – first place	2007 Rio de Janeiro	50m freestyle S11
Gold medal – first place	2007 Rio de Janeiro	100m freestyle S11
Gold medal – first place	2007 Rio de Janeiro	400m freestyle S11
Gold medal – first place	2007 Rio de Janeiro	100m butterfly S11
Gold medal – first place	2007 Rio de Janeiro	200m individual medley SM11

Donovan Tildesley (born July 24, 1984) is a retired blind Canadian swimmer. He was the flag bearer of Canada at the 2008 Paralympic Games.

== Swimming career ==
He started swimming at the age of nine. Until 2000, he had swum in many provincial and national competitions, setting many Canadian records.

He is the current world record holder for the 800-metre freestyle and the 1500-metre freestyle.

== Personal life and education ==
Tildesley graduated from the University of British Columbia in spring 2008 with an English degree Donovan works full-time as an insurance broker for Buntain Insurance Agencies in Vancouver. He also does public speaking and is a co-owner of a small radio station in Whistler, British Columbia. In May 2021, during the COVID-19 pandemic in British Columbia, Tildesley advocated for blind British Columbians to be given vaccine priority similar to vulnerable groups with other medical conditions. Donovan is also a member of the Sigma Chi fraternity and is currently contracted with Virgin Cruise Lines as an Accessibility Consultant. In 2024, Tildesley portrayed a blind veteran and lent his voice for the end narration of a Heritage Minute honouring Edwin Baker.
