= Enhamed Enhamed =

Spanish Paralympic swimmer

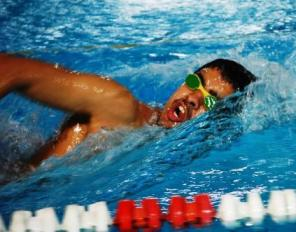

Personal information
- Full name: Enhamed Enhamed Mohamed Yahdih
- Nationality: Spanish
- Born: 11 September 1987 (age 38) Las Palmas, Canary Islands, Spain

Sport
- Sport: Swimming
- Event: Paralympic Games
Medal record
Paralympic swimming
Representing Spain
Paralympic Games
Gold medal – first place	2008 Beijing	50m freestyle S11
Gold medal – first place	2008 Beijing	100m freestyle S11
Gold medal – first place	2008 Beijing	400m freestyle S11
Gold medal – first place	2008 Beijing	100m butterfly S11
Silver medal – second place	2012 London	100m butterfly S11
Silver medal – second place	2012 London	400m freestyle S11
Bronze medal – third place	2004 Athens	100m butterfly S11
Bronze medal – third place	2004 Athens	400m freestyle S11
Bronze medal – third place	2012 London	50m freestyle S11
World Championships
Gold medal – first place	2010 Eindhoven	50m freestyle S11
Gold medal – first place	2010 Eindhoven	100m freestyle S11
Gold medal – first place	2010 Eindhoven	400m freestyle S11
Gold medal – first place	2010 Eindhoven	100m butterfly S11
Silver medal – second place	2010 Eindhoven	4x100m freestyle 49pts
- Updated on 26 April 2022

Enhamed Enhamed Mohamed Yahdih (born 11 September 1987 in Las Palmas, Canary Islands) is a Paralympic swimmer from Spain. He is an B1/S11 type swimmer.

== Personal ==
Enhamed is blind. A motivational speaker, Enhamed likes to describe the moment that he became blind at the age of eight, as "the day I won my blindness". His family immigrated to Spain from Western Sahara.

== Swimming ==
A vision impaired swimmer, he has a "tapper" who taps him so he knows when he has to initiate a turn in the water.

In 2010, he raced at the Tenerife International Open. Before the 2010 Adapted Swimming World Championship in the Netherlands, he went to a swimming camp with the national team that was part of the Paralympic High Performance Program (HARP Program). He raced at the 2011 IPC European Swimming Championships in Berlin, Germany.

=== Paralympics ===
He raced at the 2004 Summer Paralympics. He finished third in the 400 meter Freestyle and 100 meter Butterfly races. He raced at the 2008 Summer Paralympics. He won a gold medal in the 50 meter Freestyle, 100 meter Freestyle and 400 meter Freestyle races. He won a g gold medal in the 100 meter Butterfly race. He raced at the 2012 Summer Paralympics. He was the number two person to finish in the 400 meter Freestyle race. He won a bronze medal in the 50 meter Freestyle and the 100 meter Butterfly races. He won four gold medals in the Beijing and two in Athens Paralympic Games. He competed at the 2012 Summer Paralympics. Prior to heading to London, he participated in a national vision impaired swim team training camp at the High Performance Centre of Sant Cugat from 6 to 23 August. Daily at the camp, there were two in water training sessions and one out of water training session.
