= Great Britain at the 2012 Summer Paralympics =

- Flag of the United Kingdom
- IPC code: GBR
- NPC: British Paralympic Association
- Website: www.paralympics.org.uk

in London
- Competitors: 288 (plus 13 team members)
- Flag bearers: Peter Norfolk (opening); Sarah Storey and David Weir (closing)
- Medals Ranked 3rd: Gold 34 Silver 43 Bronze 43 Total 120

Summer Paralympics appearances (overview)
- 1960; 1964; 1968; 1972; 1976; 1980; 1984; 1988; 1992; 1996; 2000; 2004; 2008; 2012; 2016; 2020; 2024

Great Britain competed at the 2012 Summer Paralympics in London, United Kingdom, from 29 August to 9 September 2012 as the host nation. A total of 288 athletes were selected to compete along with 13 other team members such as sighted guides. The country finished third in the medals table, behind China and Russia, winning 120 medals in total; 34 gold, 43 silver and 43 bronze. Multiple medallists included cyclist Sarah Storey and wheelchair athlete David Weir, who won four gold medals each, and swimmer Stephanie Millward who won a total of five medals. Storey also became the British athlete with the most overall medals, 22, and equal-most gold medals, 11, in Paralympic Games history.

To commemorate the achievements of each gold medallist at the 2012 Paralympics and Olympics, Royal Mail painted a post box gold, usually in the athlete's home town.

== Team name ==
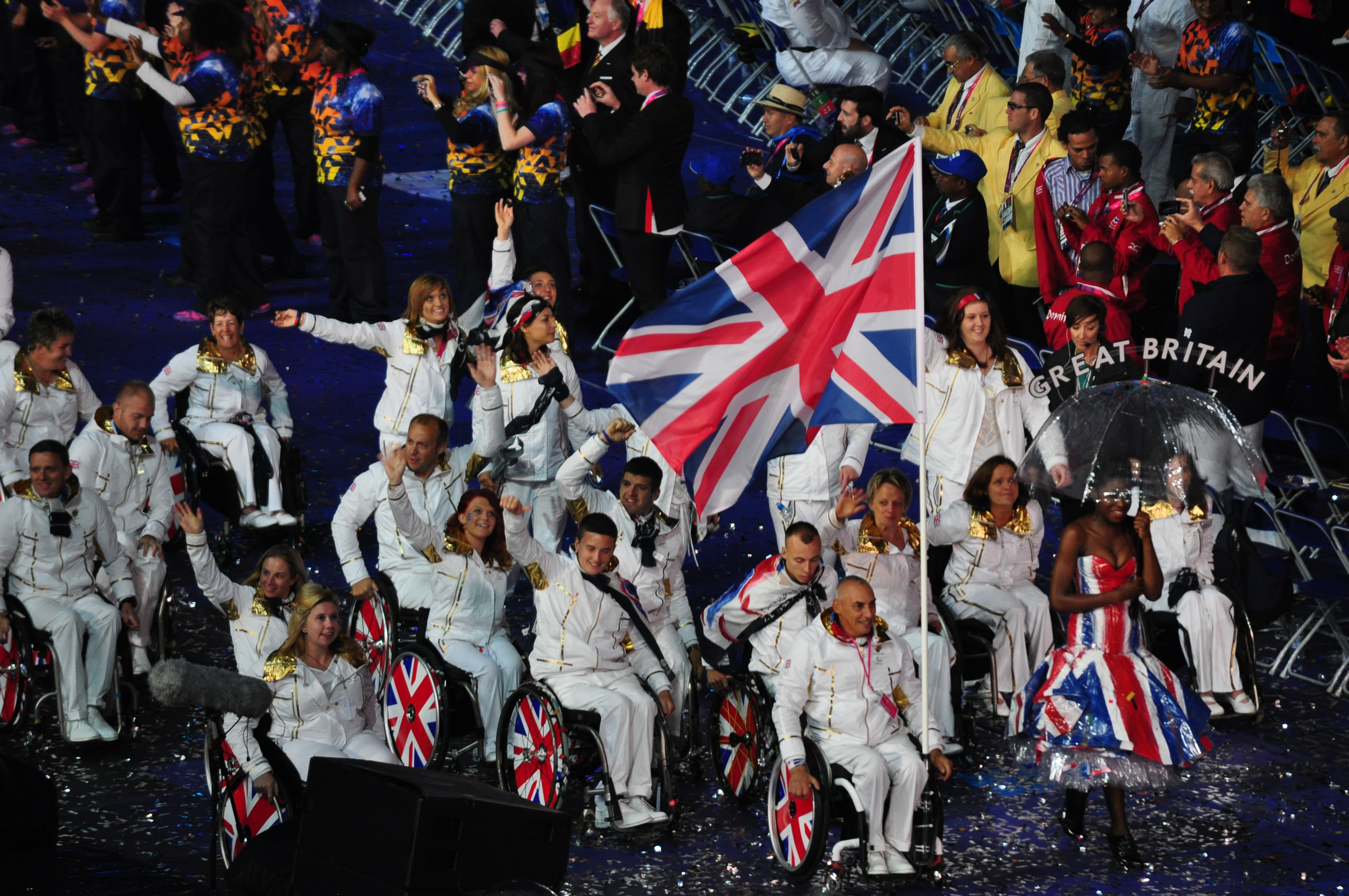
The athletes entering the stadium during the opening ceremony, led by flagbearer Peter Norfolk.

Despite the team being made up of athletes from the whole United Kingdom they compete under the name of Great Britain, a name first assigned by the International Olympic Committee (IOC) for the 1908 Summer Olympics along with the IOC country code GBR, and later used by the International Paralympic Committee for the Paralympic Games. The team is also referred to as "ParalympicsGB". Representatives of the devolved Northern Ireland government have objected to the name, which they argue creates a perception that Northern Ireland is not part of the British team, and have called for the team to be renamed as Team UK.

== Medallists ==
Each gold medallist had a post box painted gold by Royal Mail in recognition of their achievement, usually located in their home-town. A first class stamp depicting each gold medal-winning individual or team was also produced.

The following British competitors won medals at the Games. In the 'by discipline' sections below, medallists' names are in bold.

Medals by sport
**Sport**	Gold medal	Silver medal	Bronze medal	Total
Athletics	11	7	11	29
Cycling	8	9	5	22
Swimming	7	16	16	39
Equestrian	5	5	1	11
Archery	1	1	0	2
Sailing	1	0	1	2
Rowing	1	0	0	1
Shooting	0	1	2	3
Table tennis	0	1	3	4
Judo	0	1	1	2
Wheelchair tennis	0	1	1	2
Boccia	0	1	1	2
Powerlifting	0	0	1	1
Total	34	43	43	120

Medals by date
**Day**	**Date**	Gold medal	Silver medal	Bronze medal	Total
1	30 Aug	2	3	2	7
2	31 Aug	2	8	3	13
3	1 Sep	5	5	6	16
4	2 Sep	7	8	3	18
5	3 Sep	3	1	5	9
6	4 Sep	4	5	7	16
7	5 Sep	2	6	5	13
8	6 Sep	6	3	7	16
9	7 Sep	1	1	4	6
10	8 Sep	1	2	1	4
11	9 Sep	1	1	0	2
Total		34	43	43	120

Medal	Name	Sport	Event	Date
Gold	Sarah Storey	Cycling	Women's individual pursuit C5	30 August
Gold	Jonathan Fox	Swimming	Men's 100 m backstroke S7	30 August
Gold	Mark Colbourne	Cycling	Men's individual pursuit C1	31 August
Gold	Hannah Cockroft	Athletics	Women's 100 m T34	31 August
Gold	Neil Fachie; Barney Storey (pilot)	Cycling	Men's 1 km time trial B	1 September
Gold	Richard Whitehead	Athletics	Men's 200 m T42	1 September
Gold	Natasha Baker on Cabral	Equestrian	Individual championship test grade II	1 September
Gold	Sarah Storey	Cycling	Women's 500 m time trial C4-5	1 September
Gold	Eleanor Simmonds	Swimming	Women's 400 m freestyle S6	1 September
Gold	Pam Relph; Naomi Riches; David Smith; James Roe; Lily van den Broecke (cox)	Rowing	Mixed coxed four LTAMix4+	2 September
Gold	Aled Davies	Athletics	Men's discus F42	2 September
Gold	Anthony Kappes; Craig MacLean (pilot)	Cycling	Men's individual sprint B	2 September
Gold	Jessica-Jane Applegate	Swimming	Women's 200 m freestyle S14	2 September
Gold	Sophie Christiansen on Janeiro 6	Equestrian	Individual championship test grade Ia	2 September
Gold	Sophie Christiansen; Deborah Criddle; Lee Pearson; Sophie Wells	Equestrian	Team championship	2 September
Gold	David Weir	Athletics	Men's 5000 m T54	2 September
Gold	Natasha Baker on Cabral	Equestrian	Individual freestyle test grade II	3 September
Gold	Eleanor Simmonds	Swimming	Women's 200 m individual medley SM6	3 September
Gold	Mickey Bushell	Athletics	Men's 100 m T53	3 September
Gold	Danielle Brown	Archery	Women's individual compound open	4 September
Gold	Heather Frederiksen	Swimming	Women's 100 m backstroke S8	4 September
Gold	Sophie Christiansen on Janeiro 6	Equestrian	Individual freestyle test grade Ia	4 September
Gold	David Weir	Athletics	Men's 1500 m T54	4 September
Gold	Sarah Storey	Cycling	Women's time trial C5	5 September
Gold	Oliver Hynd	Swimming	Men's 200 m individual medley SM8	5 September
Gold	Helena Lucas	Sailing	2.4 mR – 1 person keelboat	6 September
Gold	Sarah Storey	Cycling	Women's road race C4-5	6 September
Gold	Josef Craig	Swimming	Men's 400 m freestyle S7	6 September
Gold	Hannah Cockroft	Athletics	Women's 200 m T34	6 September
Gold	David Weir	Athletics	Men's 800 m T54	6 September
Gold	Jonnie Peacock	Athletics	Men's 100 m T44	6 September
Gold	Josie Pearson	Athletics	Women's discus F51/52/53	7 September
Gold	David Stone	Cycling	Mixed road race T1-2	8 September
Gold	David Weir	Athletics	Men's marathon T54	9 September
Silver	Mark Colbourne	Cycling	Men's 1 km time trial C1-2-3	30 August
Silver	Nyree Kindred	Swimming	Women's 100 m backstroke S6	30 August
Silver	Hannah Russell	Swimming	Women's 400 m freestyle S12	30 August
Silver	Aileen McGlynn; Helen Scott (pilot)	Cycling	Women's 1 km time trial B	31 August
Silver	Jon-Allan Butterworth	Cycling	Men's 1 km time trial C4-5	31 August
Silver	Shaun McKeown	Cycling	Men's individual pursuit C3	31 August
Silver	Oliver Hynd	Swimming	Men's 400 m freestyle S8	31 August
Silver	Heather Frederiksen	Swimming	Women's 400 m freestyle S8	31 August
Silver	James Crisp	Swimming	Men's 100 m backstroke S9	31 August
Silver	Stephanie Millward	Swimming	Women's 100 m backstroke S9	31 August
Silver	Aaron Moores	Swimming	Men's 100 m backstroke S14	31 August
Silver	Jon-Allan Butterworth	Cycling	Men's individual pursuit C5	1 September
Silver	Lee Pearson on Gentleman	Equestrian	Individual championship test grade Ib	1 September
Silver	Matt Skelhon	Shooting	Mixed R3–10 m air rifle prone SH1	1 September
Silver	Claire Cashmore	Swimming	Women's 100 m breaststroke SB8	1 September
Silver	Sam Ingram	Judo	Men's –90 kg	1 September
Silver	Sophie Wells on Pinocchio	Equestrian	Individual championship test grade IV	2 September
Silver	Stefanie Reid	Athletics	Women's long jump F42/44	2 September
Silver	Neil Fachie; Barney Storey (pilot)	Cycling	Men's individual sprint B	2 September
Silver	Deborah Criddle on LJT Akilles	Equestrian	Individual championship test grade III	2 September
Silver	Jon-Allan Butterworth; Darren Kenny; Rik Waddon	Cycling	Mixed team sprint C1-5	2 September
Silver	Will Bayley	Table tennis	Men's singles class 7	2 September
Silver	Graeme Ballard	Athletics	Men's 100 m T36	2 September
Silver	Libby Clegg; Mikail Huggins (guide)	Athletics	Women's 100 m T12	2 September
Silver	Sascha Kindred	Swimming	Men's 200 m individual medley SM6	3 September
Silver	Sophie Wells on Pinocchio	Equestrian	Individual freestyle test grade IV	4 September
Silver	Deborah Criddle on LJT Akilles	Equestrian	Individual freestyle test grade III	4 September
Silver	Mel Clarke	Archery	Women's individual compound open	4 September
Silver	Stephanie Millward	Swimming	Women's 400 m freestyle S9	4 September
Silver	Paul Blake	Athletics	Men's 400 m T36	4 September
Silver	Mark Colbourne	Cycling	Men's time trial C1	5 September
Silver	Karen Darke	Cycling	Women's time trial H1-2	5 September
Silver	Andy Lapthorne; Peter Norfolk	Wheelchair tennis	Quad doubles	5 September
Silver	Charlotte Henshaw	Swimming	Women's 100 m breaststroke SB6	5 September
Silver	Louise Watkin	Swimming	Women's 50 m freestyle S9	5 September
Silver	Bethy Woodward	Athletics	Women's 200 m T37	5 September
Silver	Stephanie Millward	Swimming	Women's 200 m individual medley SM9	6 September
Silver	Heather Frederiksen	Swimming	Women's 100 m freestyle S8	6 September
Silver	Dan Greaves	Athletics	Men's discus F44	6 September
Silver	Claire Cashmore; Heather Frederiksen; Stephanie Millward; Louise Watkin	Swimming	Women's 4 × 100 m medley relay 34pts	7 September
Silver	David Smith	Boccia	Mixed individual BC1	8 September
Silver	Eleanor Simmonds	Swimming	Women's 100 m freestyle S6	8 September
Silver	Shelly Woods	Athletics	Women's marathon T54	9 September
Bronze	Ben Quilter	Judo	Men's –60 kg	30 August
Bronze	Zoe Newson	Powerlifting	Women's –40 kg	30 August
Bronze	Aled Davies	Athletics	Men's shot put F42–44	31 August
Bronze	Darren Kenny	Cycling	Men's individual pursuit C3	31 August
Bronze	Sam Hynd	Swimming	Men's 400 m freestyle S8	31 August
Bronze	James Bevis	Shooting	Mixed R5–10 m air rifle prone SH2	1 September
Bronze	Gemma Prescott	Athletics	Women's club throw F31/32/51	1 September
Bronze	Rob Womack	Athletics	Men's shot put F54/55/56	1 September
Bronze	Claire Williams	Athletics	Women's discus F11/12	1 September
Bronze	Jody Cundy	Cycling	Men's individual pursuit C4	1 September
Bronze	Matthew Whorwood	Swimming	Men's 400 m freestyle S6	1 September
Bronze	Aileen McGlynn; Helen Scott (pilot)	Cycling	Women's individual pursuit B	2 September
Bronze	Hannah Russell	Swimming	Women's 100 m butterfly S12	2 September
Bronze	James Clegg	Swimming	Men's 100 m butterfly S12	2 September
Bronze	Paul Davies	Table tennis	Men's singles class 1	3 September
Bronze	Lee Pearson on Gentleman	Equestrian	Individual freestyle test grade Ib	3 September
Bronze	Natalie Jones	Swimming	Women's 200 m individual medley SM6	3 September
Bronze	Susie Rodgers	Swimming	Women's 100 m freestyle S7	3 September
Bronze	Claire Cashmore; Stephanie Millward; Susie Rodgers; Louise Watkin	Swimming	Women's 4 × 100 m freestyle relay 34pts	3 September
Bronze	Matt Skelhon	Shooting	Mixed R6–50 m rifle prone SH1	4 September
Bronze	Dan Bentley; Nigel Murray; Zoe Robinson; David Smith	Boccia	Mixed team BC1-2	4 September
Bronze	Oliver Hynd	Swimming	Men's 100 m backstroke S8	4 September
Bronze	Eleanor Simmonds	Swimming	Women's 50 m freestyle S6	4 September
Bronze	David Devine	Athletics	Men's 1500 m T13	4 September
Bronze	Matthew Walker	Swimming	Men's 50 m freestyle S7	4 September
Bronze	Olivia Breen; Katrina Hart; Jenny McLoughlin; Bethy Woodward	Athletics	Women's 4 × 100 m relay T35–38	4 September
Bronze	David Stone	Cycling	Mixed time trial T1-2	5 September
Bronze	Robert Welbourn	Swimming	Men's 400 m freestyle S10	5 September
Bronze	Hannah Russell	Swimming	Women's 100 m backstroke S12	5 September
Bronze	Liz Johnson	Swimming	Women's 100 m breaststroke SB6	5 September
Bronze	David Devine	Athletics	Men's 800 m T12	5 September
Bronze	Beverley Jones	Athletics	Women's discus F37	6 September
Bronze	Niki Birrell; Alex Rickham	Sailing	SKUD 18 – 2 person keelboat	6 September
Bronze	Louise Watkin	Swimming	Women's 200 m individual medley SM9	6 September
Bronze	Susie Rodgers	Swimming	Women's 400 m freestyle S7	6 September
Bronze	Ben Rushgrove	Athletics	Men's 200 m T36	6 September
Bronze	Paul Blake	Athletics	Men's 800 m T36	6 September
Bronze	Ola Abidogun	Athletics	Men's 100 m T46	6 September
Bronze	Rachel Morris	Cycling	Women's road race H1-3	7 September
Bronze	Lucy Shuker; Jordanne Whiley	Wheelchair tennis	Women's doubles	7 September
Bronze	Jane Campbell; Sara Head	Table tennis	Women's team class 1–3	7 September
Bronze	Will Bayley; Aaron McKibbin; Ross Wilson	Table tennis	Men's team class 6–8	7 September
Bronze	Harriet Lee	Swimming	Women's 100 m breaststroke SB9	8 September

=== Multiple medallists ===
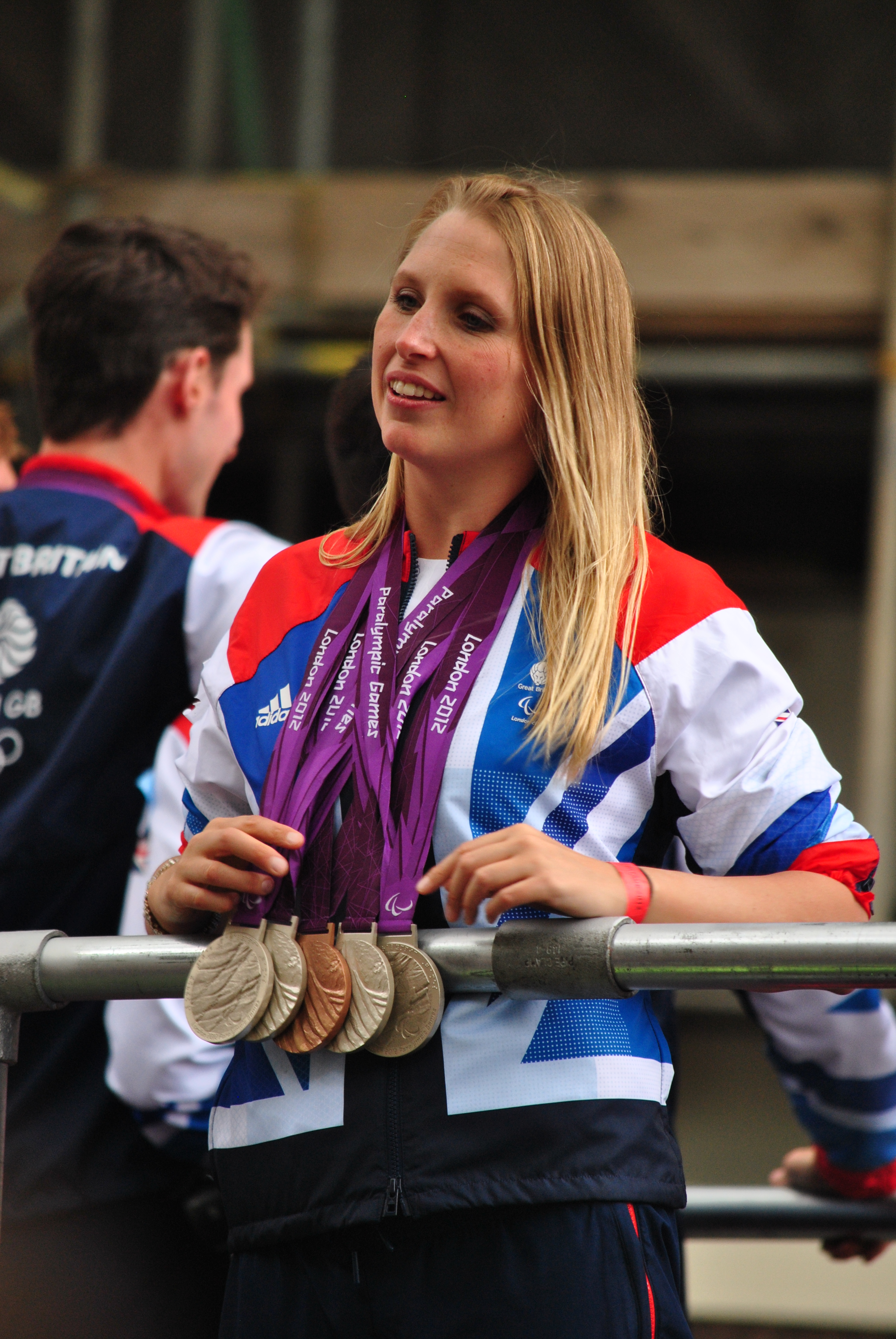
Stephanie Millward won four silver medals and one bronze in swimming events.

The following Paralympics GB competitors won multiple medals at the 2012 Paralympic Games.

Name	Medal	Sport	Event	Date
Sarah Storey	Gold; Gold; Gold; Gold	Cycling	Women's individual pursuit C5; Women's 500 m time trial C4-5; Women's time trial C5; Women's road race C4-5	30 Aug; 1 Sept; 5 Sept; 6 Sept
David Weir	Gold; Gold; Gold; Gold	Athletics	Men's 5000 m T54; Men's 1500 m T54; Men's 800 m T54; Men's marathon T54	2 Sept; 4 Sept; 6 Sept; 9 Sept
Sophie Christiansen	Gold; Gold; Gold	Equestrian	Team championship Individual championship test grade Ia; Individual freestyle test grade Ia	2 Sept; 2 Sept; 4 Sept
Eleanor Simmonds	Gold; Gold; Silver; Bronze	Swimming	Women's 400 m freestyle S6; Women's 200 m individual medley SM6; Women's 100 m freestyle S6; Women's 50 m freestyle S6	1 Sept; 3 Sept; 8 Sept; 4 Sept
Natasha Baker	Gold; Gold	Equestrian	Individual championship test grade II; Individual freestyle test grade II	1 Sept; 3 Sept
Hannah Cockroft	Gold; Gold	Athletics	Women's 100 m T34; Women's 200 m T34	31 Aug; 6 Sept
Heather Frederiksen	Gold; Silver; Silver; Silver	Swimming	Women's 100 m backstroke S8; Women's 400 m freestyle S8; Women's 100 m freestyle S8; Women's 4 × 100 m medley relay 34pts	4 Sept; 31 Aug; 6 Sept; 7 Sept
Sophie Wells	Gold; Silver; Silver	Equestrian	Team championship Individual championship test grade IV; Individual freestyle test grade IV	2 Sept; 2 Sept; 4 Sept
Deborah Criddle	Gold; Silver; Silver	Equestrian	Team championship Individual championship test grade III; Individual freestyle test grade III	2 Sept; 2 Sept; 4 Sept
Mark Colbourne	Gold; Silver; Silver	Cycling	Men's individual pursuit C1; Men's 1 km time trial C1-2-3; Men's time trial C1	31 Aug; 30 Aug; 5 Sept
Oliver Hynd	Gold; Silver; Bronze	Swimming	Men's 200 m individual medley SM8; Men's 400 m freestyle S8; Men's 100 m backstroke S8	5 Sept; 31 Aug; 4 Sept
Lee Pearson	Gold; Silver; Bronze	Equestrian	Team championship Individual championship test grade Ib; Individual freestyle test grade Ib	2 Sept; 1 Sept; 3 Sept
Neil Fachie; Barney Storey (pilot)	Gold; Silver	Cycling	Men's 1 km time trial B Men's individual sprint B	1 Sept; 2 Sept
Aled Davies	Gold; Bronze	Athletics	Men's discus throw F42; Men's shot put F42–44	2 Sept; 31 Aug
David Stone	Gold; Bronze	Cycling	Mixed road race T1-2; Mixed time trial T1-2	8 Sept; 5 Sept
Stephanie Millward	Silver; Silver; Silver; Silver; Bronze	Swimming	Women's 100 m backstroke S9; Women's 400 m freestyle S9; Women's 200 m individual medley SM9; Women's 4 × 100 m medley relay 34pts Women's 4 × 100 m freestyle relay 34pts	31 Aug; 4 Sept; 6 Sept; 7 Sept; 3 Sept
Jon-Allan Butterworth	Silver; Silver; Silver	Cycling	Men's 1 km time trial C4-5; Men's individual pursuit C5; Mixed team sprint C1-5	31 Aug; 1 Sept; 2 Sept
Louise Watkin	Silver; Silver; Bronze; Bronze	Swimming	Women's 50 m freestyle S9; Women's 4 × 100 m medley relay 34pts Women's 4 × 100 m freestyle relay 34pts Women's 200 m individual medley SM9	5 Sept; 7 Sept; 3 Sept; 6 Sept
Claire Cashmore	Silver; Silver; Bronze	Swimming	Women's 100 m breaststroke SB8; Women's 4 × 100 m medley relay 34pts Women's 4 × 100 m freestyle relay 34pts	1 Sept; 7 Sept; 3 Sept
Hannah Russell	Silver; Bronze; Bronze	Swimming	Women's 400 m freestyle S12; Women's 100 m butterfly S12; Women's 100 m backstroke S12	30 Aug; 2 Sept; 5 Sept
Will Bayley	Silver; Bronze	Table tennis	Men's singles class 7 Men's team class 6–8	2 Sept; 7 Sept
Paul Blake	Silver; Bronze	Athletics	Men's 400 m T36; Men's 800 m T36	4 Sept; 6 Sept
Darren Kenny	Silver; Bronze	Cycling	Mixed team sprint C1-5; Men's individual pursuit C3	31 Aug; 2 Sept
Aileen McGlynn; Helen Scott (pilot)	Silver; Bronze	Cycling	Women's 1 km time trial B Women's individual pursuit B	31 Aug; 2 Sept
Matt Skelhon	Silver; Bronze	Shooting	Mixed R3–10 m air rifle prone SH1; Mixed R6–50 m rifle prone SH1	1 Sept; 4 Sept
David Smith	Silver; Bronze	Boccia	Mixed individual BC1; Mixed team BC1-2	8 Sept; 4 Sept
Bethy Woodward	Silver; Bronze	Athletics	Women's 200 m T37; Women's 4 × 100 m relay T35–38	5 Sept; 4 Sept
Susie Rodgers	Bronze; Bronze; Bronze	Swimming	Women's 100 m freestyle S7; Women's 4 × 100 m freestyle relay 34pts Women's 400 m freestyle S7	3 Sept; 3 Sept; 6 Sept
David Devine	Bronze; Bronze	Athletics	Men's 1500 m T13; Men's 800 m T12	4 Sept; 5 Sept

UK Sport, the body responsible for the distribution of National Lottery funding to elite sport, set the British team a target of winning 103 medals across at least 12 different sports. The target was one medal more than the team had won at the 2008 Summer Paralympics in Beijing. Additionally UK Sport wanted the team to maintain its second-place finish in the medal table from Beijing.

== Archery ==
On 9 September 2011, Great Britain secured seven places at the Stoke Mandeville International, in addition to the six that they already had. Twenty British archers took part in a two-stage selection process to determine the final squad of thirteen.

In the women's individual compound open category, Danielle Brown defeated Mel Clarke with the final arrow of the match in an all-British final to retain the title she won in 2008. No other British archers advanced past the quarter-finals in the individual events, despite Kenny Allen setting a new Paralympic record in the ranking rounds of the men's individual recurve standing event. The men's team finished in fourth place after reaching the bronze medal final where they lost to China.

Men

Athlete	Event	Ranking round		Round of 32	Round of 16	Quarterfinals	Semifinals	Finals	
Athlete	Event	Score	Seed	Opposition score	Opposition score	Opposition score	Opposition score	Opposition score	Rank
John Cavanagh	Ind. compound W1	616	7	—N/a	Shields (USA) (10); W 7–1	Fabry (USA) (2); L 1–7	did not advance		
Richard Hennahane	Ind. compound open	640	16	Klich (CZE) (17); L 4–6	did not advance				
John Stubbs	Ind. compound open	669	4	Bye	Rodríguez (ESP) (13); L 4–6	did not advance			
Paul Browne	Ind. recurve W1/W2	598	9	Mat Saleh (MAS) (24); W 6–0	Sawicki (POL) (8); W 6–4	Tseng (TPE) (1); L 4–6	did not advance		
Kenny Allen	Ind. recurve standing	651 PR	1	Bye	Korkmaz (TUR) (17); L 4–6	did not advance			
Phil Bottomley	Ind. recurve standing	630	3	Bye	Polat (TUR) (19); L 4–6	did not advance			
Murray Elliot	Ind. recurve standing	542	24	Shestakov (RUS) (9); L 0–6	did not advance				
Kenny Allen; Phil Bottomley; Paul Browne	Team recurve open	1879	1	—N/a	Bye	Chinese Taipei (TPE) (8); W 195–179	South Korea (KOR) (5); L 190–197	China (CHN) (3); L 193–206	4

Women

Athlete	Event	Ranking round		Round of 32	Round of 16	Quarterfinals	Semifinals	Finals	
Athlete	Event	Score	Seed	Opposition score	Opposition score	Opposition score	Opposition score	Opposition score	Rank
Pippa Britton	Ind. compound open	641	8	—N/a	Rubio (ESP) (9); L 4–6	did not advance			
Danielle Brown	Ind. compound open	676	1	—N/a	Bye	Rubio (ESP) (9); W 6–4	Lyzhnikova (RUS) (4); W 6–2	Clarke (GBR) (3); W 6–4	1st place, gold medalist(s)
Mel Clarke	Ind. compound open	648	3	—N/a	Bye	Nagano (JPN) (11); W 6–4	Artakhinova (RUS) (2); W 6–0	Brown (GBR) (1); L 4–6	2nd place, silver medalist(s)
Kate Murray	Ind. recurve W1/W2	533	8	Bye	Girişmen (TUR) (9); L 1–7	did not advance			
Sharon Vennard	Ind. recurve standing	549	6	Bye	Buyanjargal (MGL) (11); W 6–2	Yan (CHN) (3); L 0–6	did not advance		
Leigh Walmsley	Ind. recurve standing	467	18	Javanmard (IRI) (15); W 6–0	Olszewska (POL) (2); L 1–7	did not advance			
Kate Murray; Sharon Vennard; Leigh Walmsley	Team recurve open	1549	6	—N/a		South Korea (KOR) (3); L 153–188	did not advance		

== Athletics ==
On 10 July 2012 the British Paralympic Association named a 49-member squad to compete for Great Britain in athletics, although Andy Kaar was later forced to withdraw due to injury. Included in the squad were David Weir, who won Britain's only athletics gold medals at the 2008 Summer Paralympics and Tracey Hinton, who competed at her sixth Paralympics.

Key

- Note–Ranks given for track events are within the athlete's heat only
- Q = Qualified for the next round
- q = Qualified for the next round as a fastest loser
- WR = World record
- PR = Paralympic record
- EU = European record
- NR = National record
- N/A = Round not applicable for the event
- Bye = Athlete not required to compete in round

Men–track

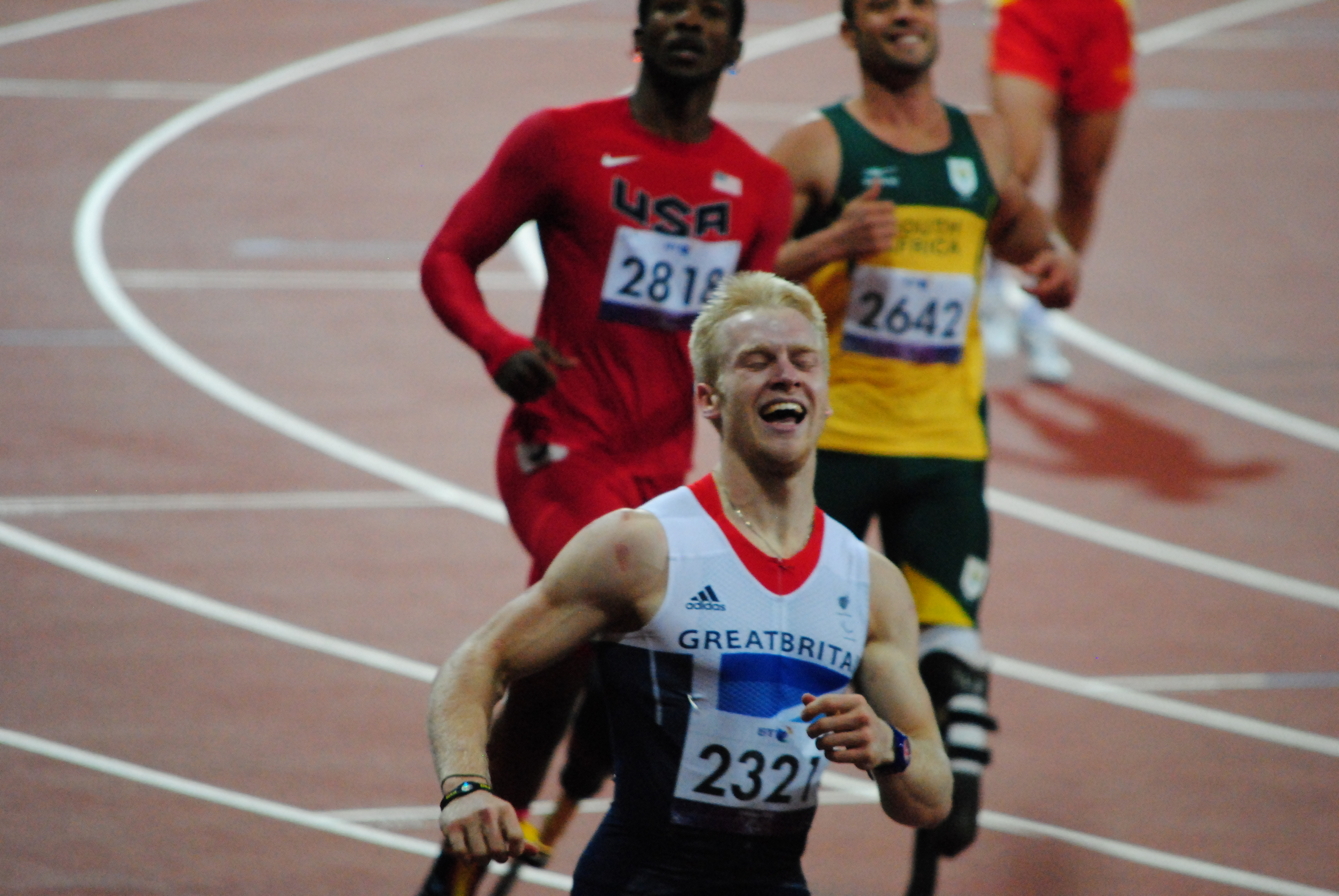
Jonnie Peacock in the T44 100 metres

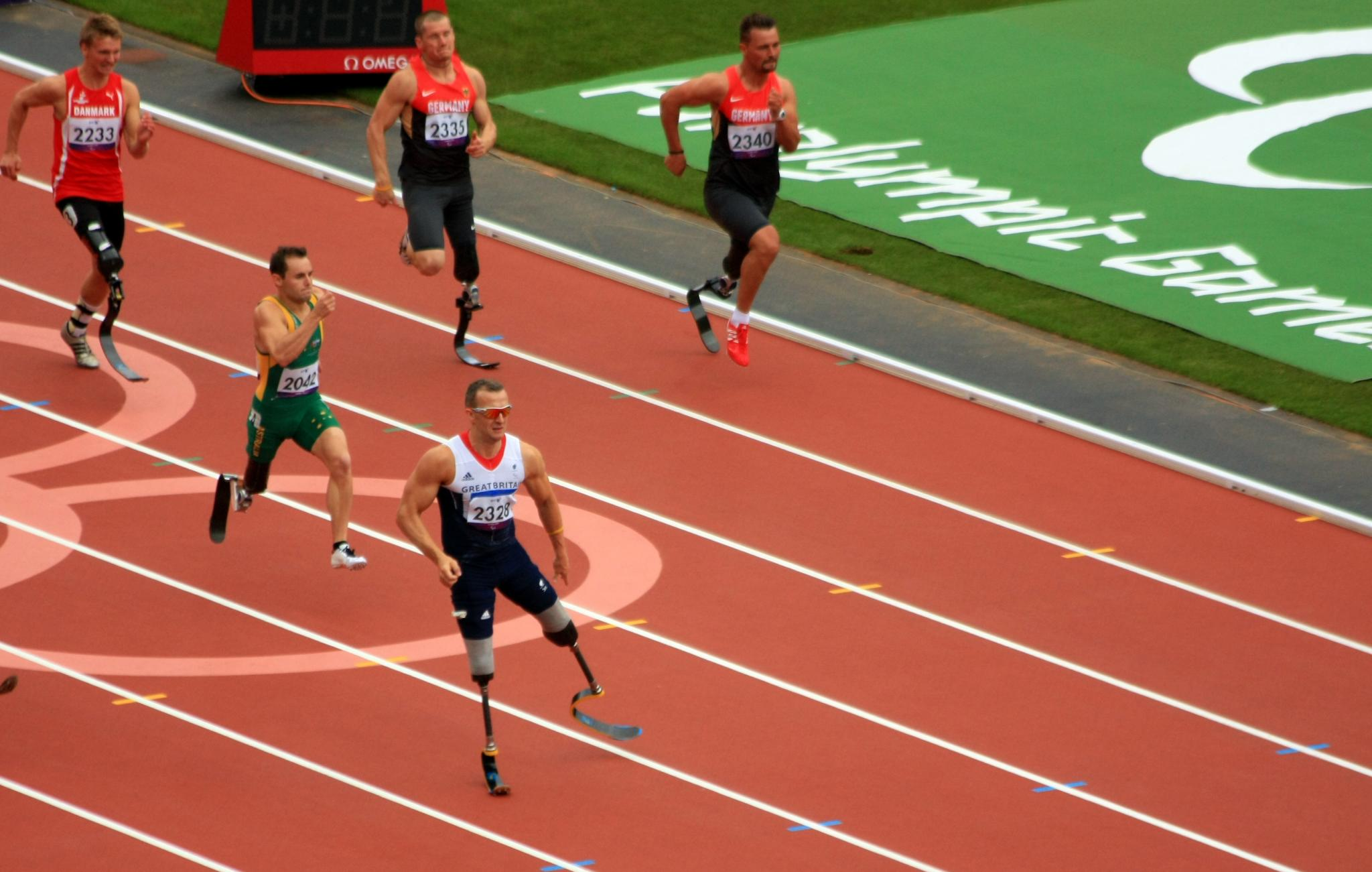
Richard Whitehead winning the gold medal in the T42 200 metres.

Athlete	Events	Heat		Semifinal		Final	
Athlete	Events	Time	Rank	Time	Rank	Time	Rank
Ola Abidogun	100 m T46	11.21	1 Q	—N/a		11.23	3rd place, bronze medalist(s)
Ola Abidogun	200 m T46	23.26	7	—N/a		did not advance	
Graeme Ballard	100 m T36	12.68	2 Q	—N/a		12.24	2nd place, silver medalist(s)
Graeme Ballard	200 m T36	—N/a				25.20	4
Paul Blake	400 m T36	—N/a				54.22	2nd place, silver medalist(s)
Paul Blake	800 m T36	—N/a				2:08.24	3rd place, bronze medalist(s)
Mickey Bushell	100 m T53	14.86	1 Q	—N/a		14.75 PR	1st place, gold medalist(s)
Mickey Bushell	200 m T53	26.73 EU	3 q	—N/a		26.32 EU	4
Jamie Carter	100 m T34	17.75	6	—N/a		did not advance	
Jamie Carter	200 m T34	30.85	5 q	—N/a		30.94	8
David Devine	800 m T12	1:55.97	1 Q	—N/a		1:58.72	3rd place, bronze medalist(s)
David Devine	1500 m T13	3:55.95	5 q	—N/a		3:49.79 EU	3rd place, bronze medalist(s)
Jordan Howe	100 m T35	13.75	4 q	—N/a		13.69	7
Jordan Howe	200 m T35	DNS		—N/a		did not advance	
Rhys Jones	100 m T37	12.19	5	—N/a		did not advance	
Rhys Jones	200 m T37	24.39	5 q	—N/a		24.68	8
Dean Miller	1500 m T37	—N/a				4:21.57	7
Stephen Morris	1500 m T20	—N/a				4:02.50	6
Stephen Osborne	100 m T51	—N/a				23.40	5
Jonnie Peacock	100 m T44	11.08 =PR	1 Q	—N/a		10.90 PR	1st place, gold medalist(s)
Sam Ruddock	100 m T35	13.92	5	—N/a		did not advance	
Sam Ruddock	200 m T35	28.75	4	—N/a		did not advance	
Ben Rushgrove	100 m T36	12.35	2 Q	—N/a		12.37	6
Ben Rushgrove	200 m T36	—N/a				24.83	3rd place, bronze medalist(s)
David Weir	800 m T54	1:37.09	1 Q	—N/a		1:37.63	1st place, gold medalist(s)
David Weir	1500 m T54	3:11.35	3 Q	—N/a		3:12.09	1st place, gold medalist(s)
David Weir	5000 m T54	11:28.88	1 Q	—N/a		11:07.65	1st place, gold medalist(s)
David Weir	Marathon T54	—N/a				1:30:20	1st place, gold medalist(s)
Richard Whitehead	100 m T42	12.97	3 Q	—N/a		12.99	7
Richard Whitehead	200 m T42	—N/a				24.38 WR	1st place, gold medalist(s)

Men–field

Athlete	Events	Result	Rank
Jonathan Adams	Shot put F34	9.84 m	14
Aled Davies	Discus F42	46.14 m EU	1st place, gold medalist(s)
Aled Davies	Shot put F42–44	13.78 m 961 pts	3rd place, bronze medalist(s)
Derek Derenalagi	Discus F57–58	39.37 m 771 pts	11
Kyron Duke	Javelin F40	38.64 m	8
Kyron Duke	Shot put F40	11.24 m	5
Dan Greaves	Discus F44	59.01 m	2nd place, silver medalist(s)
Stephen Miller	Club throw F31/32/51	26.70 m 837 pts	11
Scott Moorhouse	Javelin F42	45.30 m	7
Nathan Stephens	Discus F57–58	DNS	
Nathan Stephens	Javelin F57–58	37.09 m 828 pts	10
Kieran Tscherniawsky	Discus F32/33/34	29.05 m EU; 925 pts	10
Dan West	Shot put F34	11.37	7
Rob Womack	Shot put F54–56	11.34 m 972 pts	3rd place, bronze medalist(s)

Women–track

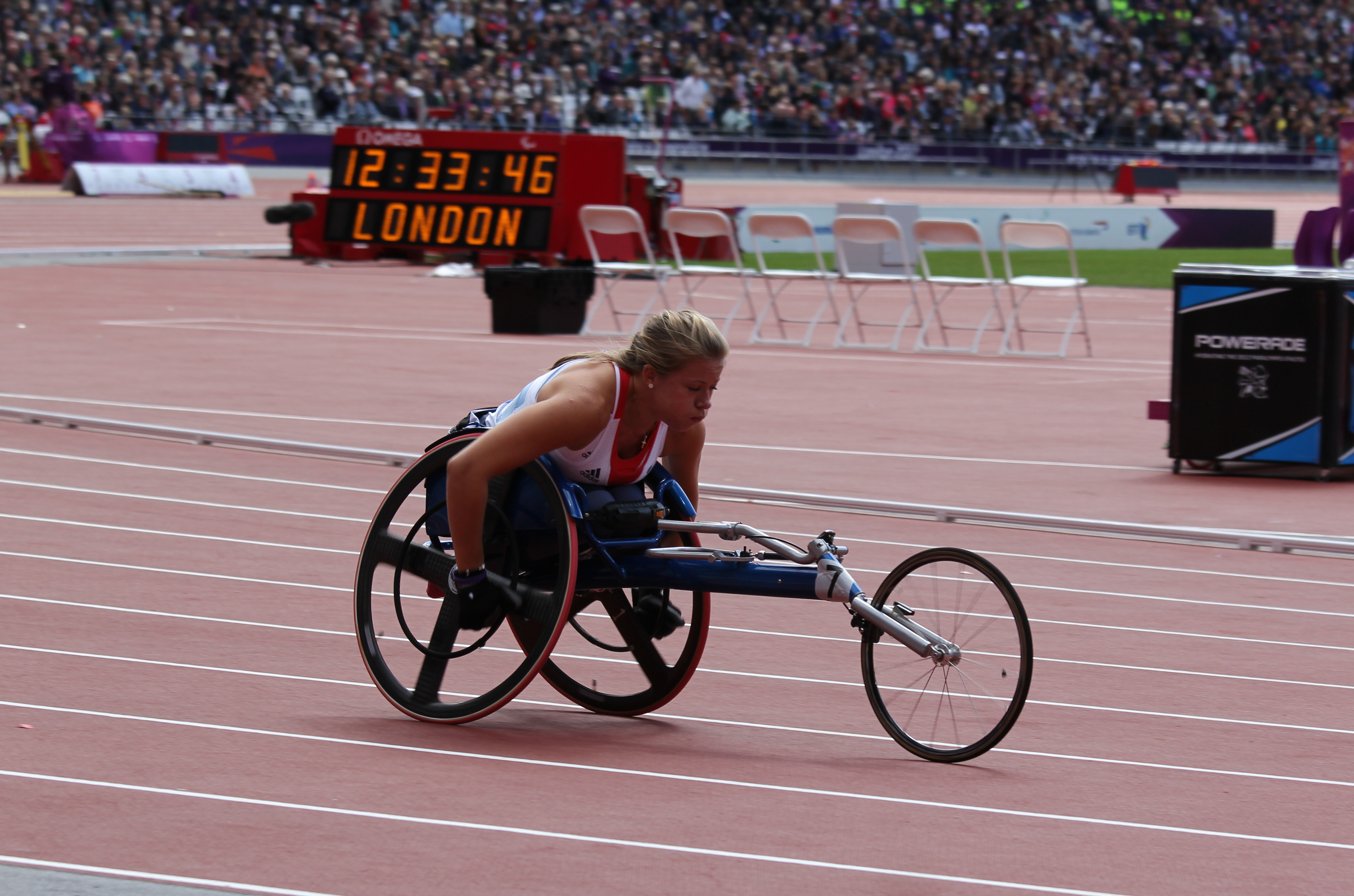
Hannah Cockroft in the T34 100 m qualifying heats

Athlete	Events	Heat		Semifinal		Final	
Athlete	Events	Time	Rank	Time	Rank	Time	Rank
Olivia Breen	100 m T38	14.21	3 Q	—N/a		14.42	5
Olivia Breen	200 m T38	29.75	5 q	—N/a		30.22	8
Sally Brown	100 m T46	13.67	3 Q	—N/a		13.74	6
Sally Brown	200 m T46	27.78	4	—N/a		did not advance	
Libby Clegg; Mikail Huggins (guide)	100 m T12	12.17 WR	1 Q	12.23	1 Q	12.13 EU	2nd place, silver medalist(s)
Libby Clegg; Mikail Huggins (guide)	200 m T12	25.10	2	—N/a		did not advance	
Hannah Cockroft	100 m T34	18.24 PR	1 Q	—N/a		18.06 PR	1st place, gold medalist(s)
Hannah Cockroft	200 m T34	33.20 PR	1 Q	—N/a		31.90 PR	1st place, gold medalist(s)
Katrina Hart	100 m T37	14.71	4 q	—N/a		14.41	6
Katrina Hart	200 m T37	31.04	5	—N/a		did not advance	
Tracey Hinton; Steffan Hughes (guide)	100 m T11	13.43	3	—N/a		did not advance	
Tracey Hinton; Steffan Hughes (guide)	200 m T11	27.26	3 q	27.38	3	did not advance	
Jade Jones	400 m T54	59.14	6	—N/a		did not advance	
Jade Jones	800 m T54	1:56.16	5	—N/a		did not advance	
Jade Jones	1500 m T54	3:32.60	5 q	—N/a		3:39.03	10
Sophie Kamlish	100 m T44	14.11	4 q	—N/a		13.98	5
Sophie Kamlish	200 m T44	29.62	3 Q	—N/a		29.08	6
Jenny McLoughlin	100 m T37	14.48	2 Q	—N/a		14.48	7
Jenny McLoughlin	200 m T37	29.73	3 Q	—N/a		30.08	5
Melissa Nicholls	100 m T34	22.41	5	—N/a		did not advance	
Melissa Nicholls	200 m T34	39.41	4 q	—N/a		40.00	7
Stefanie Reid	100 m T44	13.98	3 Q	—N/a		14.25	8
Stefanie Reid	200 m T44	28.97	4 q	—N/a		28.62	4
Hazel Robson	100 m T36	15.41	4 q	—N/a		15.23	7
Hazel Robson	200 m T36	32.03	3 Q	—N/a		32.46	4
Sophia Warner	100 m T35	—N/a				16.90	4
Sophia Warner	200 m T35	—N/a				35.25	4
Shelly Woods	800 m T54	1:56.39	3	—N/a		did not advance	
Shelly Woods	1500 m T54	3:42.12	1 Q	—N/a		3:37.97	6
Shelly Woods	5000 m T54	13:12.25	3 Q	—N/a		12:29.26	8
Shelly Woods	Marathon T54	—N/a				1:46:34	2nd place, silver medalist(s)
Bethy Woodward	200 m T37	29.50 EU	2 Q	—N/a		29.65	2nd place, silver medalist(s)
Olivia Breen; Katrina Hart; Jenny McLoughlin; Bethy Woodward	4 × 100 m relay T35-T38	—N/a				56.08	3rd place, bronze medalist(s)

Women–field

Athlete	Events	Result	Rank
Hollie Arnold	Javelin F46	36.27 m	5
Beverley Jones	Discus F37	30.99 m	3rd place, bronze medalist(s)
Beverley Jones	Shot put F37	9.85 m	7
Maxine Moore	Club throw F31/32/51	13.53 m 708 pts	12
Josie Pearson	Club throw F31/32/51	13.42 m 919 pts	5
Josie Pearson	Discus F51–53	6.58 m WR; 1122 pts	1st place, gold medalist(s)
Gemma Prescott	Club throw F31/32/51	20.50 m EU; 1015 pts	3rd place, bronze medalist(s)
Gemma Prescott	Shot put F32/33/34	4.19 m 535 pts	13
Stefanie Reid	Long jump F42–44	5.28 m PR; 1023 pts	2nd place, silver medalist(s)
Claire Williams	Discus F11–12	39.63 m 908 pts	3rd place, bronze medalist(s)

== Boccia ==
Nine British boccia players were selected to compete in London, five of whom made their Paralympic debuts. In the individual events, David Smith won silver in the BC1 event after losing to Pattaya Tadtong of Thailand in the final. The 2008 gold medal-winning BC1-2 team lost to Thailand in the semi-finals and went on to defeat Portugal in the bronze medal final.

Individual

Athlete	Event	Seeding matches	Round of 32	Round of 16	Quarterfinals	Semifinals	Final / BM	
Athlete	Event	Opposition Score	Opposition Score	Opposition Score	Opposition Score	Opposition Score	Opposition Score	Rank
David Smith	Mixed individual BC1	Bye		Shibayama (JPN); W 6–4	Zhang (CHN); W 5–2	Aandalen (NOR); W 5–2	Tadtong (THA); L 0–7	2nd place, silver medalist(s)
Dan Bentley	Mixed individual BC2	Bye	Gonçalves (POR); L 1–4	did not advance				
Nigel Murray	Mixed individual BC2	Bye		Hirose (JPN); W 8–0	Zhong (CHN); L 1–3	Semi-final 5–8; Yeung (HKG); L 0–11	Playoff 7–8; Sohn (KOR); W 7–2	7
Zoe Robinson	Mixed individual BC2	Bye	Dukovich (CAN); L 5–5	did not advance				
Scott McCowan	Mixed individual BC3	Bye	Rodriguez (ESP); W 11–0	Jeong (KOR); L 1–6	did not advance			
Jacob Thomas	Mixed individual BC3	Bye	Pamies (ESP); W 8–1	Polychronidis (GRE); L 1–5	did not advance			
Peter McGuire	Mixed individual BC4	Bye	—N/a	Dispaltro (CAN); W 4–3	Pinto (BRA); L 3–3	Semi-final 5–8; Prochazka (CZE); L 4–6	Playoff 7–8; Lau (HKG); L 3–3	8
Stephen McGuire	Mixed individual BC4	Bye	—N/a	Streharsky (SVK); W 6–1	Prochazka (CZE); W 5–3	Zheng (CHN); L 0–12	dos Santos (BRA); L 3–5	4

Pairs and teams

Athlete	Event	Pool matches		Quarterfinals	Semifinals	Final / BM	
Athlete	Event	Opposition Score	Rank	Opposition Score	Opposition Score	Opposition Score	Rank
Dan Bentley; Nigel Murray; Zoe Robinson; David Smith	Mixed team BC1-2	Argentina (ARG); W 8–4; Portugal (POR); W 5–4	1	Hong Kong (HKG); W 11–3	Thailand (THA); L 1–18	Portugal (POR); W 7–5	3rd place, bronze medalist(s)
Jessica Hunter; Scott McCowan; Jacob Thomas	Mixed pairs BC3	Greece (GRE); L 0–5; South Korea (KOR); L 2–6; Canada (CAN); W 9–1	3	—N/a	did not advance		
Peter McGuire; Stephen McGuire	Mixed pairs BC4	Slovakia (SVK); W 11–0; Canada (CAN); L 1–4; Thailand (THA); W 8–0	2	—N/a	Brazil (BRA); L 2–3	Canada (CAN); L 2–8	4

== Cycling ==
Great Britain named a 19-member cycling squad for the Games, made up of 15 riders and 4 pilots. The team included seven riders who won gold medals at the 2008 Games.

British cyclists won a total of 22 medals, eight of which were gold, to finish top of the cycling medal table. This was two more medals than the team won in Beijing, although fewer gold medals were won. Sarah Storey won four gold medals in track and road events to become the most successful British Paralympian with 22 career medals, and equal the 11 total golds of Tanni Grey-Thompson and David Roberts.

Jody Cundy won a bronze medal in the men's C4 individual pursuit, but was controversially not allowed a restart after a problem with his start in the men's C4-5 time trial. Former RAF technician Jon-Allan Butterworth, competing in his first Paralympics, won the silver medal in that event along with two other silver medals in the men's C5 individual pursuit and as part of the C1-5 sprint team. In the men's B time trial, the tandem of Anthony Kappes and pilot Craig MacLean twice had a mechanical problem with their chain and were not allowed a second restart. Neil Fachie and pilot Barney Storey won the gold medal in a world record time. Both pairings met in an all-British final in the men's B sprint event, where Kappes and MacLean won the gold medal after breaking the world record time during the qualification round. Mark Colbourne set two new world records on the way to gold in the men's C1 individual pursuit, while David Stone won gold in the T1-2 road race, defending the title he won in 2008.

In the women's H1-3 road race, Karen Darke and Rachel Morris finished together in the same time holding hands. Although the two wanted to share the bronze, Morris was awarded the medal having crossed the line slightly ahead.

=== Road ===
Athlete	Event	Time	Rank
Jon-Allan Butterworth	Men's road race C4-5	DNF	
Jon-Allan Butterworth	Men's time trial C5	36:56.39	13
Mark Colbourne	Men's road race C1-3	1:53:22	24
Mark Colbourne	Men's time trial C1	25:29.37	2nd place, silver medalist(s)
Karen Darke	Women's road race H1-3	1:43.08	4
Karen Darke	Women's time trial H1-2	33:16.09	2nd place, silver medalist(s)
Crystal Lane	Women's road race C4-5	1:54:50	6
Crystal Lane	Women's time trial C5	27:33.44	9
Shaun McKeown	Men's road race C1-3	1:43:52	21
Shaun McKeown	Men's time trial C3	24:44.37	6
Rachel Morris	Women's road race H1-3	1:43.08	3rd place, bronze medalist(s)
Rachel Morris	Women's time trial H3	36:38.97	5
David Stone	Mixed road race T1-2	45.17	1st place, gold medalist(s)
David Stone	Mixed time trial T1-2	14:25.66	3rd place, bronze medalist(s)
Sarah Storey	Women's road race C4-5	1:40:36	1st place, gold medalist(s)
Sarah Storey	Women's time trial C5	22:40.66	1st place, gold medalist(s)
Lora Turnham; Fiona Duncan (pilot)	Women's road race B	2:13:00	8
Lora Turnham; Fiona Duncan (pilot)	Women's time trial B	36:29.27	7

=== Track ===
Pursuit

Athlete	Event	Qualification		Final	
Athlete	Event	Time	Rank	Opposition Time	Rank
Mark Colbourne	Men's individual pursuit C1	3:53.970 WR	1 Q	Li (CHN); W 3:53.881 WR	1st place, gold medalist(s)
Darren Kenny	Men's individual pursuit C3	3:37.977	4 Q	Nicholas (AUS); W 3:35.257 WR	3rd place, bronze medalist(s)
Shaun McKeown	Men's individual pursuit C3	3:36.427	2 Q	Berenyi (USA); L 3:38.637	2nd place, silver medalist(s)
Jody Cundy	Men's individual pursuit C4	4:42.005	3 Q	Dueñas (COL); W OVL	3rd place, bronze medalist(s)
Jon-Allan Butterworth	Men's individual pursuit C5	4:35.026	2 Q	Gallagher (AUS); L 4:39.586	2nd place, silver medalist(s)
Aileen McGlynn; Helen Scott (pilot)	Women's individual pursuit B	3:36.930	3 Q	Turnham/Duncan (GBR); W 3:40.138	3rd place, bronze medalist(s)
Lora Turnham; Fiona Duncan (pilot)	Women's individual pursuit B	3:37.085	4 Q	McGlynn/Scott (GBR); L 3:41.147	4
Crystal Lane	Women's individual pursuit C5	3:59.220	4 Q	Southorn (NZL); L 4:02.773	4
Sarah Storey	Women's individual pursuit C5	3:32.170 WR	1 Q	Harkowska (POL); W OVL	1st place, gold medalist(s)

Key: OVL – Win by overtaking

Sprint

Athlete	Event	Qualification		Quarterfinals	Semifinals	Final	
Athlete	Event	Time	Rank	Opposition Time	Opposition Time	Opposition Time	Rank
Neil Fachie; Barney Storey (pilot)	Men's individual sprint B	10.165	2 Q	Nattkemper/Ithurrart (ARG); W 11.659, W 12.064	Porto/Villanueva (ESP); W 11.990, W 11.332	Kappes/MacLean (GBR); L, L	2nd place, silver medalist(s)
Anthony Kappes; Craig MacLean (pilot)	Men's individual sprint B	10.050 WR	1 Q	Bye	Oshiro/Ito (JPN); W 10.817, W 11.344	Fachie/Storey (GBR); W 10.473, W 10.714	1st place, gold medalist(s)
Jon-Allan Butterworth; Darren Kenny; Rik Waddon	Mixed team sprint C1-5	49.808	2 Q	—N/a		China (CHN); L 49.519	2nd place, silver medalist(s)

Time trial

Athlete	Event	Time	Rank
Neil Fachie; Barney Storey (pilot)	Men's 1km time trial B	1:01.351 WR	1st place, gold medalist(s)
Anthony Kappes; Craig MacLean (pilot)	Men's 1km time trial B	DNF	
Mark Colbourne	Men's 1km time trial C1-2-3	FT: 1:08.471; AT: 1:16.882	2nd place, silver medalist(s)
Darren Kenny	Men's 1km time trial C1-2-3	1:10.203	4
Rik Waddon	Men's 1km time trial C1-2-3	1:11.394	9
Jon-Allan Butterworth	Men's 1km time trial C4-5	1:05.985	2nd place, silver medalist(s)
Jody Cundy	Men's 1km time trial C4-5	DNF	
Aileen McGlynn; Helen Scott (pilot)	Women's 1km time trial B	1:09.469	2nd place, silver medalist(s)
Lora Turnham; Fiona Duncan (pilot)	Women's 1km time trial B	1:11.479	4
Sarah Storey	Women's 500m time trial C4-5	36.997	1st place, gold medalist(s)

Key: FT – Factor time; AT – Actual time

== Equestrian ==
The only equestrian events held in the Paralympic Games are in the Dressage discipline. Great Britain sent a team of five riders to the Games. Nine-time gold medal winner Lee Pearson took part in his fourth Paralympic Games. Also selected were Deborah Criddle, Sophie Christiansen, Sophie Wells and Natasha Baker. British riders won medals in every event winning five gold medals, five silver and one bronze. Sophie Christiansen won three gold medals, with two individual golds in the grade Ia championship and freestyle events in addition to the team gold. Natasha Baker won both the individual grade II events in her first appearance at the Paralympics. Lee Pearson, previously unbeaten in Paralympic competition, won silver and bronze in the grade Ib individual events as well as his tenth gold in the team event.

Individual

Athlete	Horse	Event	Total	
Athlete	Horse	Event	Score	Rank
Natasha Baker	Cabral	Individual championship test grade II	76.857	1st place, gold medalist(s)
Natasha Baker	Cabral	Individual freestyle test grade II	82.800	1st place, gold medalist(s)
Deborah Criddle	LJT Akilles	Individual championship test grade III	71.267	2nd place, silver medalist(s)
Deborah Criddle	LJT Akilles	Individual freestyle test grade III	78.550	2nd place, silver medalist(s)
Sophie Christiansen	Janeiro 6	Individual championship test grade Ia	82.750	1st place, gold medalist(s)
Sophie Christiansen	Janeiro 6	Individual freestyle test grade Ia	84.750	1st place, gold medalist(s)
Lee Pearson	Gentleman	Individual championship test grade Ib	75.391	2nd place, silver medalist(s)
Lee Pearson	Gentleman	Individual freestyle test grade Ib	74.200	3rd place, bronze medalist(s)
Sophie Wells	Pinocchio	Individual championship test grade IV	76.323	2nd place, silver medalist(s)
Sophie Wells	Pinocchio	Individual freestyle test grade IV	81.150	2nd place, silver medalist(s)

Team

Athlete	Horse	Event	Individual score			Total	
Athlete	Horse	Event	TT	CT	Total	Score	Rank
Sophie Christiansen	See above	Team	83.765	82.750	166.515*	468.817	1st place, gold medalist(s)
Lee Pearson	See above	Team	74.682	75.391	150.073*	468.817	1st place, gold medalist(s)
Deborah Criddle	See above	Team	72.926	71.267	144.173	468.817	1st place, gold medalist(s)
Sophie Wells	See above	Team	75.906	76.323	152.229*	468.817	1st place, gold medalist(s)

* Indicates the three best individual scores that count towards the team total.

== Football 5-a-side ==
5-a-side football is for vision-impaired athletes. All competitors wear eyeshades to account for varying levels of sight, except for the goalkeeper who may be sighted. The squad was announced on 16 April 2012. The team lost their final group match to Iran, having missed four penalties in a match that they needed to win by two goals in order to advance to the semi-finals. Captain David Clarke scored in his final international match as Britain defeated Turkey 2–0 to win the classification playoff for seventh place.

The following is the Great Britain squad in the football 5-a-side tournament of the 2012 Summer Paralympics.

No.	Pos.	Player	Age	Club
1	GK	Lewis Skyers	28
3	DF	William Norman	33
4	DF	Keryn Seal	30
5	DF	Daniel English	21
6	MF	Robin Williams	24
7	FW	David Clarke	41
8	MF	Lee Brunton	18
9	MF	Roy Turnham	27
10	MF	Darren Harris	39
13	GK	Dan James	25

Group play

Pos	Team	Pld	W	D	L	GF	GA	GD	Pts	Qualification
1	Spain (ESP)	3	1	2	0	3	1	+2	5	Qualified for the medal round
2	Argentina (ARG)	3	1	2	0	2	0	+2	5	Qualified for the medal round
3	Iran (IRI)	3	1	0	2	1	4	−3	3	Qualified for the classification round
4	Great Britain (GBR)	3	0	2	1	1	2	−1	2	Qualified for the classification round

31 August 2012
15:30

Great Britain	1–1	Spain
Clarke 22'	Report	Martín Gaitán 20' (pen.)

Riverbank Arena
Attendance: 2,630
Referee: Lucio Morgado (Brazil)

2 September 2012
15:30

Argentina	0–0	Great Britain
	Report

Riverbank Arena
Attendance: 2,179
Referee: François Carcouët (France)

4 September 2012
15:30

Great Britain	0–1	Iran
	Report	Ardekani 21' (pen.)

Riverbank Arena
Attendance: 2,273
Referee: François Carcouët (France)

Semi-final 5–8

6 September 2012
9:00

China	1–1 (a.e.t.)	Great Britain
Li 40' (pen.)	Report	English 47'
Penalties
Li (penalty scored); Wang (penalty scored)	2–1	(penalty missed) Clarke; (penalty scored) English; (penalty missed) Seal

Riverbank Arena
Attendance: 1,893
Referee: Juan Carlos Paule (Spain)

Classification 7–8

8 September 2012
9:00

Turkey	0–2	Great Britain
	Report	Seal 5'; Clarke 48'

Riverbank Arena
Attendance: 969
Referee: Germinal Lubrano (Argentina)

== Football 7-a-side ==
7-a-side football is for cerebral palsy sufferers. Athletes who classify as C5-C8 can take part in this sport, with C5 being most disabled. At least one C5 or C6 player, and no more than three C8 players, may be on the field at a given time. The squad was announced on 16 April 2012 and included Martin Sinclair, the brother of 2012 Olympian Scott Sinclair; the pair became the first siblings to represent Great Britain at a Paralympic and Olympic Games in the same year. Britain were eliminated at the group stage after defeats to Brazil and defending champions Ukraine. The team went on to defeat the US after scoring two goals in extra time in the classification playoff for seventh place.

The following is the Great Britain squad in the football 7-a-side tournament of the 2012 Summer Paralympics.

No.	Pos.	Player	Age	Club
1	GK	Craig Connell	23
2	DF	Blair Glynn	26
3	MF	Matthew Ellis	32
4	DF	Matthew Dimbylow	41
5	MF	James Richmond	32
6	FW	Alistair Patrick-Heselton	29
7	FW	Michael Barker	25
8	DF	Martin Sinclair	26
9	MF	George Fletcher	17
10	MF	Jonny Paterson	24
11	MF	Ibrahima Diallo	19
13	GK	Billy Thompson	29

Group play

Pos	Team	Pld	W	D	L	GF	GA	GD	Pts	Qualification
1	Ukraine (UKR)	3	2	1	0	17	2	+15	7	Qualified for the medal round
2	Brazil (BRA)	3	2	1	0	12	1	+11	7	Qualified for the medal round
3	Great Britain (GBR)	3	1	0	2	5	10	−5	3	Qualified for the classification round
4	United States (USA)	3	0	0	3	0	21	−21	0	Qualified for the classification round

2012-09-01
16:15

Great Britain	0–3	Brazil
	Report	Almeida 10'; Silva 13'; Dos Santos 24'

Riverbank Arena
Attendance: 13,247
Referee: Barry Huizinga (NED)

2012-09-03
11:15

Ukraine	7–1	Great Britain
Antoniuk 1', 47'; Shevchyk 9', 10'; Devlysh 15', 54'; Ponomaryov 58'	Report	Diallo 41'

Riverbank Arena
Attendance: 9,329
Referee: Álvaro Azeredo (BRA)

2012-09-05
16:15

United States	0–4	Great Britain
	Report	Richmond 20'; Fletcher 44'; Diallo 53'; Paterson 60+2'

Riverbank Arena
Attendance: 12,274
Referee: Álvaro Azeredo Quelhas (BRA)

Semi-final 5–8

2012-09-07
11:30

Great Britain	3–4 (a.e.t.)	Argentina
Diallo 14'; Dimbylow 27'; Patrick-Heselton 78'	Report	Lugrin 29'; Vivot 40', 69', 73'

Riverbank Arena
Attendance: 9,942
Referee: Barry Huizinga (NED)

Classification 7–8

2012-09-09
8:30

United States	1–3 (a.e.t.)	Great Britain
Renteria 20'	Report	Barker 29'; Diallo 70'; Fletcher 74'

Riverbank Arena
Attendance: 10,561
Referee: Barry Huizinga (NED)

== Goalball ==
As hosts, Great Britain were entitled to enter a team in the men's and women's goalball tournaments, and competed for the first time since the 2000 Games. The women's team advanced from the group stage with victories over Brazil and Denmark. They were defeated by Sweden in their quarter-final after conceding a goal in overtime. The men's team finished sixth in their group, taking their first point in Paralympic competition with a draw against Sweden.

=== Men's tournament ===
Squad list	Group stage		Quarterfinals	Semifinals	Finals	
Squad list	Opposition Result	Rank	Opposition Result	Opposition Result	Opposition Result	Rank
From: Joe Dodson; Simon Goodall; Niall Graham; Adam Knott; David Knott; Michael Sharkey	Lithuania; L 1–11	6	did not advance			
From: Joe Dodson; Simon Goodall; Niall Graham; Adam Knott; David Knott; Michael Sharkey	Turkey; L 1–7	6	did not advance			
From: Joe Dodson; Simon Goodall; Niall Graham; Adam Knott; David Knott; Michael Sharkey	Sweden; D 3–3	6	did not advance			
From: Joe Dodson; Simon Goodall; Niall Graham; Adam Knott; David Knott; Michael Sharkey	Finland; L 3–7	6	did not advance			
From: Joe Dodson; Simon Goodall; Niall Graham; Adam Knott; David Knott; Michael Sharkey	Brazil; L 1–7	6	did not advance			

Group play

Team	Pld	W	D	L	GF	GA	GD	Pts	Qualification
Turkey	5	4	1	0	26	6	+20	13	Quarterfinals
Brazil	5	3	0	2	30	20	+10	9	Quarterfinals
Lithuania	5	2	2	1	33	20	+13	8	Quarterfinals
Finland	5	2	0	3	16	24	−8	6	Quarterfinals
Sweden	5	1	2	2	16	25	−9	5	Eliminated
Great Britain	5	0	1	4	9	35	−26	1	Eliminated

Source: "London 2012 Paralympic Games - Goalball results" (PDF). Paralympic.org. 2012-10-03 – via Goalball.sport.

30 August 2012; 09:00	Lithuania	11 – 1	Great Britain	Copper Box, London; Referees: Bülent Kimyon (TUR), Kimberly Anderson (USA)
30 August 2012; 09:00	Pavliukianec 4 Zibolis 3 Juchna 2 Panovas 2	Report	Sharkey 1	Copper Box, London; Referees: Bülent Kimyon (TUR), Kimberly Anderson (USA)

31 August 2012; 11:30	Great Britain	1 – 7	Turkey	Copper Box, London; Referees: Vilma Venckutonyte (LTU), Janne Ahokas (FIN)
31 August 2012; 11:30	Sharkey 1	Report	Karakaya 4 Alkan 2 Düzgün 1	Copper Box, London; Referees: Vilma Venckutonyte (LTU), Janne Ahokas (FIN)

1 September 2012; 10:15	Sweden	3 – 3	Great Britain	Copper Box, London; Referees: Bülent Kimyon (TUR), Kimberly Anderson (USA)
1 September 2012; 10:15	Hultqvist 2 Seremati 1	Report	Graham 1 Knott 1 Sharkey 1	Copper Box, London; Referees: Bülent Kimyon (TUR), Kimberly Anderson (USA)

2 September 2012; 18:30	Great Britain	3 – 7	Finland	Copper Box, London; Referees: Warrick Jackes (AUS), Yasser Omar (EGY)
2 September 2012; 18:30	Knott 3	Report	Mattila 4 Montonen 1 Miinala 1 Posio 1	Copper Box, London; Referees: Warrick Jackes (AUS), Yasser Omar (EGY)

4 September 2012; 18:30	Great Britain	1 – 7	Brazil	Copper Box, London; Referees: Janne Ahokas (FIN), Vilma Venckutonyte (LTU)
4 September 2012; 18:30	Knott 1	Report	Marques 4 Celente 2 Silvestre 1	Copper Box, London; Referees: Janne Ahokas (FIN), Vilma Venckutonyte (LTU)

=== Women's tournament ===
Squad list	Group stage		Quarterfinals	Semifinals	Finals	
Squad list	Opposition Result	Rank	Opposition Result	Opposition Result	Opposition Result	Rank
From: Georgina Bullen; Jessica Luke; Amy Ottaway; Anna Sharkey; Louise Simpson	China; L 1–7	2 Q	Sweden; L 1–2	did not advance		
From: Georgina Bullen; Jessica Luke; Amy Ottaway; Anna Sharkey; Louise Simpson	Finland; D 1–1	2 Q	Sweden; L 1–2	did not advance		
From: Georgina Bullen; Jessica Luke; Amy Ottaway; Anna Sharkey; Louise Simpson	Brazil; W 3–1	2 Q	Sweden; L 1–2	did not advance		
From: Georgina Bullen; Jessica Luke; Amy Ottaway; Anna Sharkey; Louise Simpson	Denmark; W 5–0	2 Q	Sweden; L 1–2	did not advance		

Group play

Team	Pld	W	D	L	GF	GA	GD	Pts	Qualification
China	4	4	0	0	28	4	+24	12	Quarterfinals
Great Britain	4	2	1	1	10	9	+1	7	Quarterfinals
Brazil	4	2	0	2	8	15	−7	6	Quarterfinals
Finland	4	1	1	2	10	13	−3	4	Quarterfinals
Denmark	4	0	0	4	3	18	−15	0	Eliminated

Source: "London 2012 Paralympic Games - Goalball results" (PDF). Paralympic.org. 2012-10-03 – via Goalball.sport.

30 August 2012; 18:30	China	7 – 1	Great Britain	Copper Box, London; Referees: Janned Ahokas (FIN), Dawna Christy (CAN)
30 August 2012; 18:30	Wang R. 4 Chen 2 Lin 1	Report	Sharkey 1	Copper Box, London; Referees: Janned Ahokas (FIN), Dawna Christy (CAN)

31 August 2012; 15:00	Finland	1 – 1	Great Britain	Copper Box, London; Referees: Morten Hammershoi (DEN), Ali Aldarsony (KSA)
31 August 2012; 15:00	Leppänen 1	Report	Luke 1	Copper Box, London; Referees: Morten Hammershoi (DEN), Ali Aldarsony (KSA)

2 September 2012; 09:00	Great Britain	3 – 1	Brazil	Copper Box, London; Referees: Ali Aldarsony (KSA), Morten Hammershoi (DEN)
2 September 2012; 09:00	Sharkey 2 Luke 1	Report	de Souza 1	Copper Box, London; Referees: Ali Aldarsony (KSA), Morten Hammershoi (DEN)

4 September 2012; 09:00	Great Britain	5 – 0	Denmark	Copper Box, London; Referees: Kimberly Anderson (USA), Shinji Mizuno (JPN)
4 September 2012; 09:00	Sharkey 3 Luke 1 Ottaway 1	Report		Copper Box, London; Referees: Kimberly Anderson (USA), Shinji Mizuno (JPN)

Quarter-final

5 September 2012; 12:45	Great Britain	1 – 2	Sweden	Copper Box, London; Referees: Carla Da Matta (BRA), Thomas Baerz (GER)
5 September 2012; 12:45	Sharkey 1	Report	Gustavsson 2	Copper Box, London; Referees: Carla Da Matta (BRA), Thomas Baerz (GER)

== Judo ==
Five British judokas qualified for the Games. Two sets of brothers were selected: Dan and Marc Powell, as well as Joe and Sam Ingram. Sam Ingram and Ben Quilter competed at the 2008 Games, with Ingram winning a bronze medal. All events were for visually impaired athletes. Sam Ingram won a silver medal in the –90 kg category, narrowly losing the gold medal contest to Jorge Hierrezuelo Marcillis of Cuba by a yuko. No other British judoka reached the semifinals, but Ben Quilter advanced through the repechage contest to win a bronze medal in the –60 kg category after defeating Japan's Takaaki Hirai by ippon.

Athlete	Event	Preliminaries	Quarterfinals	Semifinals	Repechage First round	Repechage Final	Final / BM	
Athlete	Event	Opposition Result	Opposition Result	Opposition Result	Opposition Result	Opposition Result	Opposition Result	Rank
Joe Ingram	Men's –100 kg	Rees (CAN); W 111–0001	Choi (KOR); L 0011–0132	did not advance	Bye	Upmann (GER); L 000–100	did not advance	
Sam Ingram	Men's –90 kg	Bye	Crockett (USA); W 100–000	Lencina (ARG); W 0101–0003	Bye		Marcillis (CUB); L 000–001	2nd place, silver medalist(s)
Dan Powell	Men's –81 kg	Krieger (GER); L 0003–1121	did not advance		Pereira (BRA); W 1001–000H	Alonso (CUB); L 000–100	did not advance	
Marc Powell	Men's –73 kg	Bye	Solovey (UKR); L 000–111	did not advance	Ali Shanani (IRI); L 0101–1103	did not advance		
Ben Quilter	Men's –60 kg	Bye	Noura (ALG); L 000–1021	did not advance	Aajim (MGL); W 100–000	Hawthorne (USA); W 022–0002	Hirai (JPN); W 100–000	3rd place, bronze medalist(s)

== Powerlifting ==
Six powerlifters were named in the GB team, although Paul Efayena was barred from participating due to a previous criminal conviction. Natalie Blake, Jason Irving, Ali Jawad and Anthony Peddle had all competed at previous Games, with Peddle making his seventh appearance in 2012. Zoe Newson won a bronze medal in the women's –40 kg category, Britain's only medal of the Games, by successfully lifting 88 kg with her final attempt. Ali Jawad narrowly missed out on a medal in the men's –56 kg category with two attempts at 189 kg judged to be unsuccessful. He finished fourth having weighed in heavier than third placed Jian Wang of China, after both competitors finished on 185 kg.

Athlete	Event	Total lifted	Rank
Natalie Blake	Women's –52 kg	DNF	
Jason Irving	Men's –60 kg	163 kg	8
Ali Jawad	Men's –56 kg	185 kg	4
Zoe Newson	Women's –40 kg	88 kg	3rd place, bronze medalist(s)
Anthony Peddle	Men's –48 kg	140 kg	8

== Rowing ==
The mixed adaptive double crew of Captain Nick Beighton and Sam Scowen qualified for London 2012 at the World Rowing Championships. 2008 gold medallist Tom Aggar qualified in the men's single sculls. The mixed coxed four of Naomi Riches, Pam Relph, David Smith, James Roe and cox Lily van den Broecke, who won gold at the 2011 World Rowing Championships, were also selected. Britain's only medal of the regatta was a gold won by the mixed coxed four crew. Nick Beighton and Sam Scowen came fourth in the mixed double sculls, missing out on bronze in a photo finish. Tom Aggar finished in fourth place in the final of the men's single sculls, his first defeat in five years of international racing.

Athlete(s)	Event	Heats		Repechage		Final	
Athlete(s)	Event	Time	Rank	Time	Rank	Time	Rank
Tom Aggar	Men's single sculls	4:56.65	1 FA	Bye		4:58.08	4
Sam Scowen; Nick Beighton	Mixed double sculls	4:03.23	2 R	4:05.91	1 FA	4:05.77	4
Lily van den Broecke (cox); Naomi Riches; Pam Relph; James Roe; David Smith	Mixed coxed four	3:23.59	1 FA	Bye		3:19.38	1st place, gold medalist(s)

Qualification Legend: FA=Final A (medal); FB=Final B (non-medal); R=Repechage

== Sailing ==
Great Britain entered the same three crews that had competed in 2008. On 8 August 2011, five sailors became the first people to be named on the 2012 Paralympic team. John Robertson, Hannah Stodel and Stephen Thomas were selected in the three-person Sonar competition. Also announced in the team were current SKUD 18 World Champions, Niki Birrell and Alex Rickham. Helena Lucas was subsequently selected in the 2.4 mR class.

Great Britain won their first ever medals in the sport since its introduction at the 2000 Paralympic Games. The final day of racing was cancelled due to lack of wind, with Helena Lucas in gold medal position in the 2.4 mR class and the SKUD 18 crew in bronze medal position after ten races. The three-person Sonar crew were given a four-point penalty for breaking the boat maintenance rules, moving them from third to fifth position overall.

Athlete	Event	Race											Total points	Net points	Rank
Athlete	Event	1	2	3	4	5	6	7	8	9	10	11	Total points	Net points	Rank
Helena Lucas	2.4 mR – 1 person keelboat	2	1	3	(11)	1	1	1	4	8	5	CAN	37	26	1st place, gold medalist(s)
Niki Birrell; Alex Rickham	SKUD 18 – 2 person keelboat	2	1	4	2	1	3	4	2	3	(5)	CAN	27	22	3rd place, bronze medalist(s)
John Robertson; Stephen Thomas; Hannah Stodel	Sonar – 3 person keelboat	4	8	4	5	4	(13)	10; DPI	4	4	2	CAN	58	45	5

Note: (#) denotes the highest points finish which does not count towards the final net points total.

== Shooting ==
A squad of twelve competitors were selected to take part in the shooting events including 2008 gold medal winner Matt Skelhon and Di Coates, who first competed at the 1984 Games, making her eighth Paralympic appearance. Matt Skelhon won silver in the 10 m air rifle prone SH1 event that he won in 2008. James Bevis won a bronze medal in the 10 m air rifle prone SH2 event, losing a shootoff to Raphaël Voltz of France 10.4–10.5 after both scored a total of 705.9. Matt Skelhon went on to win bronze in the 50 m rifle prone SH1 event, which he first took part in eighteen months previously.

Athlete	Event	Qualification		Final	
Athlete	Event	Score	Rank	Score	Rank
James Bevis	Mixed R5–10 m air rifle prone SH2	600 =WR	8 Q	705.9	3rd place, bronze medalist(s)
Adrian Bunclark	Men's P1–10 m air pistol SH1	537	30	did not advance	
Karen Butler	Women's R2–10 m air rifle standing SH1	384	12	did not advance	
Karen Butler	Women's R8–50 m rifle 3 positions SH1	559	7 Q	650.8	6
Karen Butler	Mixed R6–50 m rifle prone SH1	581	23	did not advance	
Georgina Callingham	Mixed R5–10 m air rifle prone SH2	600 =WR	=5 Q	705.2	7
Di Coates	Women's R2–10 m air rifle standing SH1	389	9	did not advance	
Di Coates	Mixed R3–10 m air rifle prone SH1	590	42	did not advance	
Ryan Cockbill	Mixed R4–10 m air rifle standing SH2	592	21	did not advance	
Ryan Cockbill	Mixed R5–10 m air rifle prone SH2	598	17	did not advance	
Richard Davies	Mixed R4–10 m air rifle standing SH2	596	16	did not advance	
Adam Fontain	Mixed R4–10 m air rifle standing SH2	593	20	did not advance	
Ben Jesson	Mixed R6–50 m rifle prone SH1	566	47	did not advance	
Nathan Milgate	Men's R1-10 m air rifle standing SH1	588	10	did not advance	
Nathan Milgate	Mixed R3–10 m air rifle prone SH1	599	11	did not advance	
Mandy Pankhurst	Women's R2–10 m air rifle standing SH1	380	16	did not advance	
Matt Skelhon	Mixed R3–10 m air rifle prone SH1	600 =WR	=1 Q	706.4	2nd place, silver medalist(s)
Matt Skelhon	Mixed R6–50 m rifle prone SH1	589	7 Q	693.2	3rd place, bronze medalist(s)
Matt Skelhon	Men's R1–10 m air rifle standing SH1	579	18	did not advance	

== Sitting volleyball ==
The British Paralympic Association announced that the men's and women's teams would take up their home quota places in September 2011 and March 2012 respectively. The women's team, including 7 July 2005 London bombings survivor Martine Wright, finished eighth without winning a set. The men's team also finished eighth, having advanced to the quarter-final stage after defeating Morocco.

=== Men's tournament ===
Roster

The following is the British roster in the men's volleyball tournament of the 2012 Summer Paralympics.

Head coach: Ian LeGrand

№	Name	Date of birth	Position	2012 club
1	Netra Rana	9 December 1983	L	(United Kingdom) Battle Back Phoenix
2	Justin Phillips	31 August 1990	WS	(United Kingdom) Malory Eagles
3	Samuel Scott	3 January 1991	WS	(United Kingdom) FDSW Celtic Dragons
4	John Munro	4 May 1972	M	(United Kingdom) London Lynx
5	Benjamin Thomas Hall	18 September 1985	UN	(United Kingdom) Surrey Gators
6	John Worrall	30 March 1983	UN	(United Kingdom) London Lynx
7	Robert Richardson	17 May 1982	SE	(United Kingdom) Surrey Gators
8	Anton Raimondo	17 May 1978	UN	(United Kingdom) London Lynx
9	Richard Dobell	12 August 1967	SE	(United Kingdom) Malory Eagles
10	Charles Walker	28 February 1980	M	(United Kingdom) Surrey Gators
11	James Roberts	11 May 1986	UN	(United Kingdom) FDSW Celtic Dragons

Group play

Pos	Team	Pld	W	L	Pts	SW	SL	SR	SPW	SPL	SPR
1	Germany	4	4	0	8	12	3	4.000	340	266	1.278
2	Russia	4	3	1	7	11	5	2.200	356	275	1.295
3	Egypt	4	2	2	6	9	6	1.500	424	402	1.055
4	Great Britain	4	1	3	5	3	9	0.333	230	276	0.833
5	Morocco	4	0	4	4	0	12	0.000	157	300	0.523

30 August 2012; 14:00	Great Britain	0–3	Russia	ExCeL London, London; Referees: Ronaldo Chaves (BRA), Benno Meijer (NED)
30 August 2012; 14:00	(14–25, 18–25, 20–25); Report			ExCeL London, London; Referees: Ronaldo Chaves (BRA), Benno Meijer (NED)

31 August 2012; 21:00	Great Britain	0–3	Egypt	ExCeL London, London; Referees: Joe Campbell (GBR), Dariusz Jasinski (POL)
31 August 2012; 21:00	(15–25, 17–25, 22–25); Report			ExCeL London, London; Referees: Joe Campbell (GBR), Dariusz Jasinski (POL)

2 September 2012; 14:00	Great Britain	3–0	Morocco	ExCeL London, London; Referees: Sari Mannersuo (FIN), Stephen Giugni (AUS)
2 September 2012; 14:00	(25–20, 25–19, 25–12); Report			ExCeL London, London; Referees: Sari Mannersuo (FIN), Stephen Giugni (AUS)

3 September 2012; 11:00	Great Britain	0–3	Germany	ExCeL London, London; Referees: Masoud Yazdanpanah (IRI), Xin Xia (CHN)
3 September 2012; 11:00	(19–25, 16–25, 14–25); Report			ExCeL London, London; Referees: Masoud Yazdanpanah (IRI), Xin Xia (CHN)

Quarter-final

5 September 2012; 21:20	Great Britain	0–3	Iran	ExCeL London, London; Referees: Dimosthenis Kostopoulos (GRE), Ute Fisher (GER)
5 September 2012; 21:20	(18–25, 13–25, 15–25); Report			ExCeL London, London; Referees: Dimosthenis Kostopoulos (GRE), Ute Fisher (GER)

5th–8th place semi-final

6 September 2012; 19:00	Brazil	3–0	Great Britain	ExCeL London, London; Referees: Amin Al-Traifi (KSA), Dariusz Jasinski (POL)
6 September 2012; 19:00	(25–20, 25–16, 25–15); Report			ExCeL London, London; Referees: Amin Al-Traifi (KSA), Dariusz Jasinski (POL)

7th–8th place match

7 September 2012; 16:00	China	3–0	Great Britain	ExCeL London, London; Referees: Toomas Murulo (EST)
7 September 2012; 16:00	(25–14, 25–16, 25–22); Report			ExCeL London, London; Referees: Toomas Murulo (EST)

=== Women's tournament ===
Roster

The following is the British roster in the women's volleyball tournament of the 2012 Summer Paralympics.

№	Name	Date of birth	Position	2012 club
1	Julie Rogers	2 November 1998		(United Kingdom) Loughborough Lions
2	Victoria Widdup	18 April 1987		(United Kingdom) London Lynx
3	Jessica Frezza	21 September 1993		(United Kingdom) Loughborough Lions
4	Samantha Bowen	21 March 1986		(United Kingdom) FDSW Celtic Dragons
5	Andrea Green	29 May 1970		(United Kingdom) Loughborough Lions
6	Emma Wiggs	14 June 1980		(United Kingdom) Portsmouth
7	Martine Wright	30 September 1972		(United Kingdom) London Lynx
8	Amy Brierly	30 September 1989		(United Kingdom) FDSW Celtic Dragons
9	Nicole Hill	4 September 1980		(United Kingdom) Portsmouth
10	Jessica O'Brien	16 May 1992		(United Kingdom) FDSW Celtic Dragons
11	Claire Harvey	19 February 1974		(United Kingdom) London Lynx

Group play

Pos	Team	Pld	W	L	Pts	SW	SL	SR	SPW	SPL	SPR
1	Ukraine	3	3	0	6	9	1	9.000	241	167	1.443
2	Netherlands	3	2	1	5	7	4	1.750	251	201	1.249
3	Japan	3	1	2	4	4	6	0.667	190	218	0.872
4	Great Britain	3	0	3	3	0	9	0.000	129	225	0.573

31 August 2012; 9:00	Great Britain	0–3	Ukraine	ExCeL London, London; Attendance: Report; Referees: Adnan Kolos (BIH), Sari Mannersuo (FIN)
31 August 2012; 9:00	(9–25, 20–25, 14–25)			ExCeL London, London; Attendance: Report; Referees: Adnan Kolos (BIH), Sari Mannersuo (FIN)

1 September 2012; 16:00	Great Britain	0–3	Netherlands	ExCeL London, London; Referees: Mourad El-Baroudy (EGY), Xin Xia (CHN)
1 September 2012; 16:00	(13–25, 12–25, 15–25); Report			ExCeL London, London; Referees: Mourad El-Baroudy (EGY), Xin Xia (CHN)

2 September 2012; 19:00	Great Britain	0–3	Japan	ExCeL London, London; Referees: Dariusz Jasinski (POL), Anton Probst (GER)
2 September 2012; 19:00	(11–25, 21–25, 14–25); Report			ExCeL London, London; Referees: Dariusz Jasinski (POL), Anton Probst (GER)

Semi-final 5–8

4 September 2012; 19:00	Brazil	3–0	Great Britain	ExCeL London, London; Referees: Stephen Giugni (AUS), Masoud Yazdanpanah (IRI)
4 September 2012; 19:00	(25–19, 25–10, 25–7); Report			ExCeL London, London; Referees: Stephen Giugni (AUS), Masoud Yazdanpanah (IRI)

Classification 7–8

6 September 2012; 9:00	Great Britain	0–3	Japan	ExCeL London, London; Referees: Dimosthenis Kostopoulos (GRE), Janko Plesnik (SLO)
6 September 2012; 9:00	(23–25, 19–25, 13–25); Report			ExCeL London, London; Referees: Dimosthenis Kostopoulos (GRE), Janko Plesnik (SLO)

== Swimming ==
British Swimming selected 44 swimmers for the Paralympic Games based on qualifying times set at trial events in London and Sheffield in March and April 2012 respectively. Selection of the first sixteen competitors was confirmed by the British Paralympic Association in April 2012, with a further 28 selected in May on confirmation of available slots by IPC Swimming.

British swimmers won seven gold, sixteen silver and sixteen bronze medals in total. In the women's S6 events, Eleanor Simmonds set new world record times in the 400 m freestyle and 200 m individual medley SM6 to win two gold medals, in addition to silver in the 100 m freestyle and bronze in the 50 m freestyle events. S7 swimmers Josef Craig and Jonathan Fox both posted new world record times on the way to gold in the 400 m freestyle and 100 m backstroke respectively. Jessica-Jane Applegate won the women's 200 m freestyle S14 setting a new Paralympic record in the final. Gold medals were also won by S8 swimmers Heather Frederiksen in the women's 100 m backstroke and Oliver Hynd, who set a new European record in the men's 200 m individual medley SM8. Stephanie Millward won five medals, the most of any ParalympicsGB competitor, in both individual and relay events.

Men

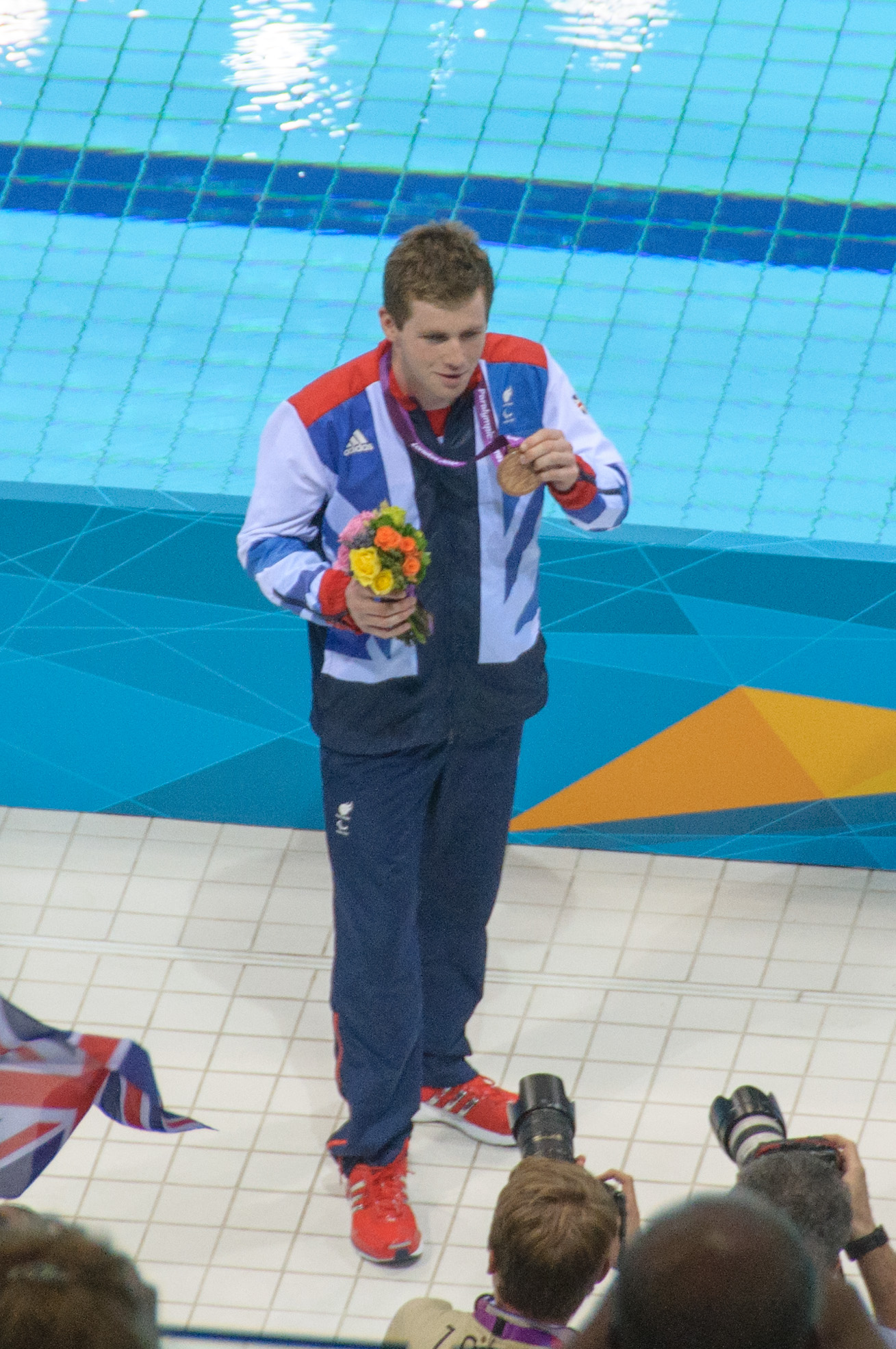
James Clegg won a bronze medal in the men's 100 m butterfly S12.

Athlete	Events	Heats		Final	
Athlete	Events	Time	Rank	Time	Rank
James Anderson	50 m freestyle S2	1:10.61	10	did not advance	
James Anderson	100 m freestyle S2	2:27.43	7 Q	2:31.33	8
James Anderson	50 m backstroke S2	1:07.17	3 Q	1:07.30	4
Jack Bridge	100 m backstroke S10	1:09.38	16	did not advance	
Jack Bridge	100 m breaststroke SB9	1:10.01	4 Q	1:10.40	4
Jack Bridge	200 m individual medley SM10	2:21.35	11	did not advance	
James Clegg	50 m freestyle S12	25.52	=7 Q	25.20	6
James Clegg	100 m freestyle S12	56.05	7 Q	55.94	8
James Clegg	100 m butterfly S12	59.99	3 Q	1:00.00	3rd place, bronze medalist(s)
Josef Craig	50 m freestyle S7	29.48	7 Q	29.39	7
Josef Craig	100 m freestyle S7	1:04.00	4 Q	1:02.20	4
Josef Craig	400 m freestyle S7	4:45.79 WR	1 Q	4:42.81 WR	1st place, gold medalist(s)
James Crisp	100 m freestyle S9	1:00.76	17	did not advance	
James Crisp	400 m freestyle S9	4:26.03	8 Q	4:26.61	8
James Crisp	100 m backstroke S9	1:04.01	2 Q	1:03.62	2nd place, silver medalist(s)
James Crisp	100 m breaststroke SB8	1:15.84	5 Q	1:15.71	6
James Crisp	200 m individual medley SM9	2:22.09	3 Q	2:21.10	5
Graham Edmunds	50 m freestyle S10	25.28	10	did not advance	
Graham Edmunds	100 m freestyle S10	56.01	13	did not advance	
Graham Edmunds	100 m butterfly S10	1:05.48	19	did not advance	
Jonathan Fox	50 m freestyle S7	29.38	6 Q	28.87	6
Jonathan Fox	100 m freestyle S7	1:02.47	2 Q	1:02.26	5
Jonathan Fox	400 m freestyle S7	4:49.91	2 Q	4:48.03	4
Jonathan Fox	100 m backstroke S7	1:09.86 WR	1 Q	1.10.46	1st place, gold medalist(s)
Sean Fraser	50 m freestyle S8	28.20	11	did not advance	
Sean Fraser	100 m freestyle S8	1:00.78	6 Q	1:00.58	7
Sean Fraser	100 m backstroke S8	1:10.02	5 Q	1:09.67	5
Sean Fraser	100 m butterfly S8	1:05.94	7 Q	1:05.99	6
James Hollis	100 m backstroke S10	1:06.40	13	did not advance	
James Hollis	100 m butterfly S10	59.98	10	did not advance	
Oliver Hynd	400 m freestyle S8	4:36.40	3 Q	4:27.88	2nd place, silver medalist(s)
Oliver Hynd	100 m backstroke S8	1:08.59	3 Q	1:08.35	3rd place, bronze medalist(s)
Oliver Hynd	100 m butterfly S8	1:07.62	12	did not advance	
Oliver Hynd	200 m individual medley SM8	2:27.95	2 Q	2:24.63 EU	1st place, gold medalist(s)
Sam Hynd	100 m freestyle S8	1:05.21	14	did not advance	
Sam Hynd	400 m freestyle S8	4:33.25	1 Q	4:32.93	3rd place, bronze medalist(s)
Sam Hynd	100 m breaststroke SB8	1:16.80	7 Q	1:16.64	7
Sam Hynd	200 m individual medley SM8	2:28.88	3 Q	2:28.03	4
Sascha Kindred	50 m freestyle S6	33.36	10	did not advance	
Sascha Kindred	50 m butterfly S6	33.19	6 Q	DSQ	
Sascha Kindred	100 m breaststroke SB7	1:23.59	4 Q	1:23.53	4
Sascha Kindred	200 m individual medley SM6	2:44.29	1 Q	2:41.50 EU	2nd place, silver medalist(s)
Aaron Moores	100 m backstroke S14	1:04.80	3 Q	1:04.44	2nd place, silver medalist(s)
Aaron Moores	100 m breaststroke SB14	1:11.10	6 Q	1:10.46	6
Andrew Mullen	50 m freestyle S5	37.40	8 Q	38.08	8
Andrew Mullen	50 m backstroke S5	39.69	4 Q	39.54	4
Andrew Mullen	50 m butterfly S5	39.71	4 Q	40.04	4
James O'Shea	100 m breaststroke SB5	1:39.88	5 Q	1:38.30	4
Daniel Pepper	200 m freestyle S14	2:01.94	4 Q	2:03.27	7
Daniel Pepper	100 m breaststroke SB14	1:11.27	7 Q	1:12.64	7
Morgyn Peters	100 m backstroke S9	1:05.12	4 Q	1:04.79	5
Ben Procter	200 m freestyle S14	2:01.97	5 Q	2:03.30	8
Ben Procter	100 m backstroke S14	1:06.01	7 Q	1:05.88	5
Craig Rodgie	200 m freestyle S14	2:05.59	9	did not advance	
Craig Rodgie	100 m backstroke S14	1:07.03	12	did not advance	
Anthony Stephens	50 m freestyle S5	35.59	7 Q	35.74	6
Anthony Stephens	100 m freestyle S5	1:19.05	4 Q	1:17.23	5
Anthony Stephens	200 m freestyle S5	2:51.42	4 Q	2:49.83	4
Anthony Stephens	50 m backstroke S5	43.60	11	did not advance	
Anthony Stephens	50 m butterfly S5	DNS		did not advance	
Matthew Walker	50 m freestyle S7	28.59	2 Q	28.47	3rd place, bronze medalist(s)
Matthew Walker	50 m butterfly S7	33.06	6 Q	33.93	7
Robert Welbourn	100 m freestyle S10	55.45	10	did not advance	
Robert Welbourn	400 m freestyle S10	4:17.13	5 Q	4:08.18	3rd place, bronze medalist(s)
Robert Welbourn	100 m butterfly S10	1:01.96	15	did not advance	
Robert Welbourn	200 m individual medley SM10	2:19.80	10	did not advance	
Matthew Whorwood	50 m freestyle S6	33.91	13	did not advance	
Matthew Whorwood	100 m freestyle S6	1:11.47	7 Q	1:11.21	7
Matthew Whorwood	400 m freestyle S6	5:17.28	3 Q	5:11.59	3rd place, bronze medalist(s)
Matthew Whorwood	100 m breaststroke SB6	1:36.09	10	did not advance	
Matthew Whorwood	200 m individual medley SM6	2:53.82	5 Q	2:53.08	5
Thomas Young	50 m freestyle S8	27.81	=7 Q	27.71	7
Thomas Young	100 m freestyle S8	1:01.85	8 Q	1:00.53	6
Thomas Young	400 m freestyle S8	4:34.16	2 Q	4:33.57	4
Thomas Young	100 m backstroke S8	1:09.54	4 Q	1:08.91	4
Thomas Young	100 m breaststroke SB7	1:24.90	5 Q	1:23.69	5
Thomas Young	200 m individual medley SM8	2:35.98	11	did not advance	
Sean Fraser; Sam Hynd; Robert Welbourn; Thomas Young	4 × 100 m freestyle relay 34pts	3:57.87	1 Q	3:56.38	5
Jack Bridge; Jonathan Fox; James Hollis; Thomas Young	4 × 100 m medley relay 34pts	4:22.79	1 Q	4:20.54	5

Qualifiers for the latter rounds (Q) of all events were decided on a time only basis, therefore positions shown are overall results versus competitors in all heats.

Women

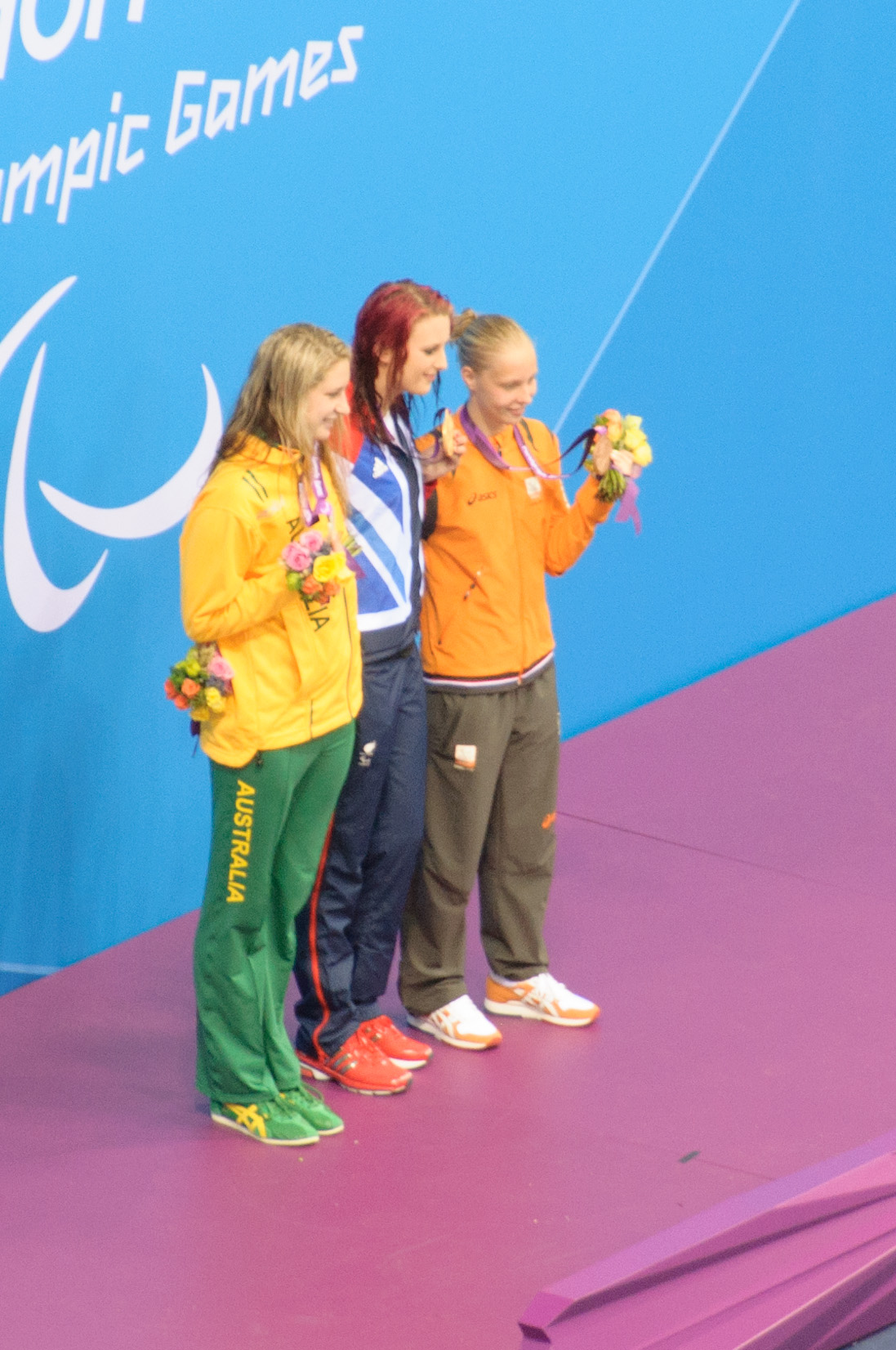
Jessica-Jane Applegate (centre) after winning a gold medal in the women's 200 m freestyle S14 event.

Athlete	Events	Heats		Final	
Athlete	Events	Time	Rank	Time	Rank
Gemma Almond	100 m freestyle S10	1:07.40	13	did not advance	
Gemma Almond	400 m freestyle S10	5:07.43	11	did not advance	
Gemma Almond	100 m butterfly S10	1:14.07	8 Q	1:13.24	8
Gemma Almond	200 m individual medley SM10	2:41.28	7 Q	2:42.16	8
Jessica-Jane Applegate	200 m freestyle S14	2:14.31	1 Q	2:12.63 PR	1st place, gold medalist(s)
Jessica-Jane Applegate	100 m backstroke S14	1:10.32	3 Q	1:09.58	4
Claire Cashmore	100 m freestyle S9	1:06.81	9	did not advance	
Claire Cashmore	100 m butterfly S9	1:13.26	6 Q	1:14.56	8
Claire Cashmore	100 m breaststroke SB8	1:22.90	1 Q	1:20.39	2nd place, silver medalist(s)
Claire Cashmore	200 m individual medley SM9	2:39.75	4 Q	2:38.08	4
Chloe Davies	200 m freestyle S14	2:18.10	9	did not advance	
Chloe Davies	100 m backstroke S14	1:09.22	1 Q	1:10.10	5
Heather Frederiksen	50 m freestyle S8	32.34	6 Q	31.93	6
Heather Frederiksen	100 m freestyle S8	1:07.53	2 Q	1:08.07	2nd place, silver medalist(s)
Heather Frederiksen	400 m freestyle S8	4:58.29	2 Q	5:00.50	2nd place, silver medalist(s)
Heather Frederiksen	100 m backstroke S8	1:17.63	1 Q	1:17.00	1st place, gold medalist(s)
Rhiannon Henry	50 m freestyle S13	29.06	5 Q	29.41	7
Rhiannon Henry	100 m freestyle S13	1:01.87	4 Q	1:02.00	4
Rhiannon Henry	200 m individual medley SM13	2:35.83	4 Q	2:32.84	4
Charlotte Henshaw	400 m freestyle S8	5:42.19	12	did not advance	
Charlotte Henshaw	100 m breaststroke SB6	1:39.64 PR	1 Q	1:39.16	2nd place, silver medalist(s)
Emma Hollis	100 m freestyle S8	1:25.35	18	did not advance	
Emma Hollis	400 m freestyle S8	6:02.84	14	did not advance	
Emma Hollis	100 m breaststroke SB7	DNS		did not advance	
Emma Hollis	200 m individual medley SM8	3:28.90	13	did not advance	
Liz Johnson	100 m breaststroke SB6	1:41.09	2 Q	1:40.90	3rd place, bronze medalist(s)
Liz Johnson	200 m individual medley SM6	3:28.22	7 Q	3:25.64	6
Natalie Jones	50 m freestyle S6	38.74	10	did not advance	
Natalie Jones	100 m freestyle S6	1:22.74	8 Q	1:22.64	7
Natalie Jones	400 m freestyle S6	6:03.95	7 Q	6:02.02	7
Natalie Jones	50 m butterfly S6	41.97	10	did not advance	
Natalie Jones	200 m individual medley SM6	3:16.41	2 Q	3:14.29	3rd place, bronze medalist(s)
Nyree Kindred	100 m backstroke S6	1:27.96 PR	1 Q	1:26.23	2nd place, silver medalist(s)
Harriet Lee	50 m freestyle S10	29.97	10	did not advance	
Harriet Lee	100 m breaststroke SB9	1:19.44	3 Q	1:19.53	3rd place, bronze medalist(s)
Harriet Lee	200 m individual medley SM10	2:38.06	6 Q	2:39.42	7
Amy Marren	50 m freestyle S9	31.02	10	did not advance	
Amy Marren	400 m freestyle S9	4:53.04	4 Q	4:50.79	4
Amy Marren	100 m backstroke S9	1:14.21	5 Q	1:14.31	5
Natalie Massey	200 m freestyle S14	2:16.21	4 Q	2:15.35	6
Natalie Massey	100 m backstroke S14	1:11.89	7 Q	1:12.87	7
Natalie Massey	100 m breaststroke SB14	1:26.56	9	did not advance	
Stephanie Millward	400 m freestyle S9	4:46.00	2 Q	4:40.01 EU	2nd place, silver medalist(s)
Stephanie Millward	100 m backstroke S9	1:10.81	2 Q	1:11.07	2nd place, silver medalist(s)
Stephanie Millward	100 m butterfly S9	1:12.32	4 Q	1:12.01	5
Stephanie Millward	200 m individual medley SM9	2:38.47	2 Q	2:36.21	2nd place, silver medalist(s)
Susie Rodgers	50 m freestyle S7	34.74	5 Q	34.08	4
Susie Rodgers	100 m freestyle S7	1:12.86	2 Q	1:12.61	3rd place, bronze medalist(s)
Susie Rodgers	400 m freestyle S7	5:22.08 EU	2 Q	5:18.93 EU	3rd place, bronze medalist(s)
Susie Rodgers	100 m backstroke S7	1:26.09	3 Q	1:26.03	6
Susie Rodgers	50 m butterfly S7	37.45	3 Q	37.54	4
Hannah Russell	50 m freestyle S12	28.32	4 Q	28.07	4
Hannah Russell	100 m freestyle S12	1:02.22	1 Q	1:02.38	6
Hannah Russell	400 m freestyle S12	4:41.25	1 Q	4:38.60	2nd place, silver medalist(s)
Hannah Russell	100 m backstroke S12	1:11.18	1 Q	1:10.15	3rd place, bronze medalist(s)
Hannah Russell	100 m butterfly S12	—N/a		1:08.57	3rd place, bronze medalist(s)
Eleanor Simmonds	50 m freestyle S6	36.45	4 Q	36.11	3rd place, bronze medalist(s)
Eleanor Simmonds	100 m freestyle S6	1:16.68	2 Q	1:14.82 EU	2nd place, silver medalist(s)
Eleanor Simmonds	400 m freestyle S6	5:24.64 PR	1 Q	5:19.17 WR	1st place, gold medalist(s)
Eleanor Simmonds	200 m individual medley SM6	3:06.97 WR	1 Q	3:05.39 WR	1st place, gold medalist(s)
Lauren Steadman	50 m freestyle S9	31.04	11	did not advance	
Lauren Steadman	100 m freestyle S9	1:05.98	8 Q	1:06.07	8
Lauren Steadman	400 m freestyle S9	4:56.23	7 Q	4:55.17	6
Louise Watkin	50 m freestyle S9	29.35	1 Q	29.21	2nd place, silver medalist(s)
Louise Watkin	100 m freestyle S9	1:04.63	3 Q	1:04.45	5
Louise Watkin	100 m breaststroke SB9	1:25.48	10	did not advance	
Louise Watkin	200 m individual medley SM9	2:39.21	3 Q	2:37.79	3rd place, bronze medalist(s)
Claire Cashmore; Stephanie Millward; Susie Rodgers; Louise Watkin	4 × 100 m freestyle relay 34pts	—N/a		4:24.71 EU	3rd place, bronze medalist(s)
Claire Cashmore; Heather Frederiksen; Stephanie Millward; Louise Watkin	4 × 100 m medley relay 34pts	—N/a		4:53.98	2nd place, silver medalist(s)

Qualifiers for the latter rounds (Q) of all events were decided on a time only basis, therefore positions shown are overall results versus competitors in all heats.

== Table tennis ==
Thirteen athletes competed for GB in table tennis. Athletes in classes 1 to 5 compete in wheelchairs, while classes 6 to 10 compete standing. Lower numbered classes indicate a higher severity disability. Athletes with intellectual disabilities compete in class 11.

Will Bayley won a silver medal in the class 7 men's singles, losing to Jochen Wollmert of Germany in the final. Paul Davies, competing in his first Paralympics, won a bronze medal in the class 1 men's singles. In the team events, both the men's class 6–8 team and the women's class 1–3 team won bronze medals with victories over Germany and Italy respectively.

Men

Athlete	Event	Preliminaries			Quarterfinals	Semifinals	Final / BM	
Athlete	Event	Opposition Result	Opposition Result	Rank	Opposition Result	Opposition Result	Opposition Result	Rank
Paul Davies	Singles class 1	Borgato (ITA); W 3–0	Vevera (AUT); W 3–2	1	—N/a	Nikelis (GER); L 0–3	Lee (KOR); W 3–2	3rd place, bronze medalist(s)
Rob Davies	Singles class 1	Quinlan (IRL); W 3–0	Ducay (FRA); L 2–3	2	—N/a	did not advance		
Scott Robertson	Singles class 5	Cao (CHN); L 1–3	Taus (CZE); L 0–3	3	—N/a	did not advance		
David Wetherill	Singles class 6	Alecci (ITA); W 3–2	Kusiak (GER); L 1–3	3	did not advance			
Will Bayley	Singles class 7	Namsaga (THA); W 3–0	Liao (CHN); W 3–0	1	Bye	Nikolenko (UKR); W 3–1	Wollmert (GER); L 1–3	2nd place, silver medalist(s)
Paul Karabardak	Singles class 7	Kim (KOR); W 3–0	Popov (UKR); L 0–3	2	did not advance			
Aaron McKibbin	Singles class 8	Sun (CHN); L 0–3	Loicq (BEL); L 2–3	3	did not advance			
Ross Wilson	Singles class 8	Bye			Skrzynecki (POL); W 3–1	Zhao (CHN); L 2–3	Andersson (SWE); L 0–3	4
Kim Daybell	Singles class 10	Carbinatti (BRA); W 3–0	Lian (CHN); L 2–3	2	did not advance			
Will Bayley; Aaron McKibbin; Ross Wilson	Team class 6–8	Bye			Italy (ITA); W 3–0	Poland (POL); L 2–3	Germany (GER); W 3–0	3rd place, bronze medalist(s)

Women

Athlete	Event	Preliminaries			Quarterfinals	Semifinals	Final / BM	
Athlete	Event	Opposition Result	Opposition Result	Rank	Opposition Result	Opposition Result	Opposition Result	Rank
Jane Campbell	Singles class 3	Sigala (MEX); W 3–2	Altintas (TUR); W 3–1	1	Ahlquist (SWE); L 0–3	did not advance		
Sara Head	Singles class 3	Choi (KOR); W 3–2	Brunelli (ITA); W 3–2	1	Pintar (SLO); W 3–2	Mader (AUT); L 0–3	Kanova (SVK); L 1–3	4
Susan Gilroy	Singles class 4	Ahmed (EGY); W 3–0	Moon (KOR); L 1–3	2	—N/a	did not advance		
Victoria Bromley	Singles class 11	Kosacheva (RUS); L 0–3	Wong (HKG); L 0–3	3	—N/a	did not advance		
Jane Campbell; Sara Head	Team class 1–3	Bye			Turkey (TUR); W 3–2	South Korea (KOR); L 0–3	Italy (ITA); W 3–2	3rd place, bronze medalist(s)

== Wheelchair basketball ==
As hosts Great Britain automatically qualified one men's team and one women's team in wheelchair basketball. Competing athletes are given an eight-level-score specific to wheelchair basketball, ranging from 0.5 to 4.5 with lower scores representing a higher degree of disability. The sum score of all players on the court cannot exceed 14.

The men's team were defeated by Canada in the semi-final and went on to finish fourth after losing the bronze medal final to the US. The women's team were knocked out of the competition at the quarter-final stage by Germany. They finished seventh after winning their classification final against Mexico.

=== Men's tournament ===
The following is the Great Britain roster in the men's wheelchair basketball tournament of the 2012 Summer Paralympics.

Great Britain men's national wheelchair basketball team – 2012 Summer Paralympics roster
Players
Coaches

No.	Name	Age – Date of birth	Pts.	Club	Ctr.
4	Gaz Choudhry	27 – 23 June 1985		Capital City Aces	(United Kingdom)
5	Dan Highcock	30 – 5 December 1981		Wolves Rhinos	(United Kingdom)
6	Matt Sealy	30 – 21 June 1982		Capital City Aces	(United Kingdom)
7	Terry Bywater	29 – 28 February 1983		Sheffield Steelers	(United Kingdom)
8	Simon Munn	44 – 31 January 1968		Capital City Aces	(United Kingdom)
9	Jon Pollock	35 – 11 May 1977		Wolves Rhinos	(United Kingdom)
10	Abdi Jama	29 – 1 November 1982		Wolves Rhinos	(United Kingdom)
11	Matt Byrne	37 – 8 October 1974		Wolves Rhinos	(United Kingdom)
12	Ian Sagar	30 – 29 March 1982		Thamside Owls	(United Kingdom)
13	Peter Finbow	37 – 17 May 1975		Thamside Owls	(United Kingdom)
14	Jon Hall	30 – 13 March 1982		Thamside Owls	(United Kingdom)
15	Ade Orogbemi	34 – 11 May 1978		Capital City Aces	(United Kingdom)

Legend

- Club – describes last
  club before the tournament
- Age – describes age
  on 30 August 2012

Group stage		Quarterfinal	Semifinal	Final	
Opposition Result	Rank	Opposition Result	Opposition Result	Opposition Result	Rank
Germany; L 72–77	3 Q	Turkey; W 75–70	Canada; L 52–69	Bronze final United States; L 46–61	4
Canada; L 54–70	3 Q	Turkey; W 75–70	Canada; L 52–69	Bronze final United States; L 46–61	4
Colombia; W 81–41	3 Q	Turkey; W 75–70	Canada; L 52–69	Bronze final United States; L 46–61	4
Poland; W 87–58	3 Q	Turkey; W 75–70	Canada; L 52–69	Bronze final United States; L 46–61	4
Japan; W 71–55	3 Q	Turkey; W 75–70	Canada; L 52–69	Bronze final United States; L 46–61	4

Group play

Team	Pld	W	L	PF	PA	PD	Pts	Qualification
Canada	5	5	0	362	280	+82	10	Quarter-finals
Germany	5	4	1	339	303	+36	9	Quarter-finals
Great Britain	5	3	2	365	301	+64	8	Quarter-finals
Poland	5	2	3	327	341	−14	7	Quarter-finals
Japan	5	1	4	273	330	−57	6	Eliminated
Colombia	5	0	5	223	334	−111	5	Eliminated

30 August 2012
19:00

Report

Great Britain	72–77 (OT)	Germany
Scoring by quarter: 10–21, 17–13, 23–13, 16–19, Overtime: 6–11
Pts: Munn 21; Rebs: Munn 14; Asts: Bywater 9		Pts: Passiwan 26; Rebs: Bienek 11; Asts: Bienek 12

North Greenwich Arena, London
Referees: Juan Uruñuela (ESP)

31 August 2012
21:15

Report

Canada	70–54	Great Britain
Scoring by quarter: 20–11, 14–18, 18–7, 18–18
Pts: Anderson 29; Rebs: Anderson 10; Asts: Anderson 14		Pts: Choudhry 11; Rebs: Highcock 7 Asts: Orogbemi 6

North Greenwich Arena, London
Referees: Max Kindervater (GER)

1 September 2012
19:00

Report

Great Britain	81–41	Colombia
Scoring by quarter: 25–13, 21–8, 18–11, 17–9
Pts: Bywater 21; Rebs: Sagar 11; Asts: Bywater 8		Pts: Sanz Londoño 14; Rebs: Hawkins 12; Asts: Leep Ipema, Chaparro 3

North Greenwich Arena, London
Referees: Shu Fei Hsieh (TPE)

2 September 2012
18:30

Report

Poland	58–87	Great Britain
Scoring by quarter: 10–22, 14–23, 19–25, 15–17
Pts: Balcerowski 11; Rebs: Filipski 7 Asts: Filipski 5		Pts: Bywater 22; Rebs: Sagar 8 Asts: Hall 6

Basketball Arena, London
Referees: Rui Marques (BRA)

3 September 2012
15:15

Report

Japan	55–71	Great Britain
Scoring by quarter: 14–25, 10–21, 13–14, 18–11
Pts: Fujimoto 20; Rebs: Kozai, Fujimoto 5 Asts: Kozai 7		Pts: Bywater 19; Rebs: Munn 9 Asts: Bywater, Pollock 5

North Greenwich Arena, London
Referees: Matt Wells (AUS)

Quarter-final

5 September 2012
15:15

Report

Turkey	70–75	Great Britain
Scoring by quarter: 14–16, 16–16, 15–22, 25–21
Pts: Gürbulak 28; Rebs: Ercan 10; Asts: Gürbulak 9		Pts: Bywater 23; Rebs: Pollock 9 Asts: Bywater 13

North Greenwich Arena, London
Referees: Juan Uruñuela (ESP)

Semi-final

6 September 2012
21:15

Report

Great Britain	52–69	Canada
Scoring by quarter: 16–21, 11–12, 10–24, 15–12
Pts: Orogbemi 14; Rebs: Bywater, Sagar 5 Asts: Pollock 5		Pts: Anderson 17; Rebs: Johnson 14; Asts: Anderson 11

North Greenwich Arena, London
Referees: Mati Quintana (ARG)

Bronze medal match

8 September 2012
19:00

Report

United States	61–46	Great Britain
Scoring by quarter: 17–10, 12–10, 10–13, 22–13
Pts: Serio 20; Rebs: Scott 8 Asts: Serio 8		Pts: Bywater 14; Rebs: Bywater 12; Asts: Orogbemi 5

North Greenwich Arena, London
Referees: Matt Wells (AUS)

=== Women's tournament ===
The following is the Great Britain roster in the women's wheelchair basketball tournament of the 2012 Summer Paralympics.

Great Britain women's national wheelchair basketball team – 2012 Summer Paralympics roster
Players
Coaches

No.	Name	Age – Date of birth	Pts.	Club	Ctr.
4	Caroline Maclean	37 – 19 April 1975		Essex Outlaws	(United Kingdom)
5	Sarah Grady	28 – 25 April 1984
6	Clare Strange	32 – 18 September 1979		Milton Keynes Aces	(United Kingdom)
7	Helen Freeman	22 – 23 November 1989		UIC Flames	(United States)
8	Laurie Williams	20 – 4 February 1992		Nottingham Coyotes	(United Kingdom)
9	Judith Hamer	21 – 3 December 1990
10	Amy Conroy	19 – 22 October 1992		Aylesbury Aces	(United Kingdom)
11	Maddie Thompson	17 – 29 March 1995		Nottingham Coyotes	(United Kingdom)
12	Helen Turner	34 – 15 October 1977		Aspire Force Wheelchair Basketball Club	(United Kingdom)
13	Louise Sugden	28 – 20 July 1984		Aylesbury Aces	(United Kingdom)
14	Natasha Davies	21 – 6 December 1990		Loughborough University	(United Kingdom)
15	Sarah Mcphee	32 – 13 February 1980		Tameside Owls	(United Kingdom)

Head coach

- (United Kingdom) Garry Peel

Legend

- Club – describes last
  club before the tournament
- Age – describes age
  on 30 August 2012

Group stage		Quarter-final	Semi-final	Final	
Opposition Result	Rank	Opposition Result	Opposition Result	Opposition Result	Rank
Netherlands; L 35–62	4 Q	Germany; L 44–55	5th–8th place semi-final China; L 55–72	7th/8th place match Mexico; W 59–37	7
Australia; L 24–51	4 Q	Germany; L 44–55	5th–8th place semi-final China; L 55–72	7th/8th place match Mexico; W 59–37	7
Brazil; W 42–37	4 Q	Germany; L 44–55	5th–8th place semi-final China; L 55–72	7th/8th place match Mexico; W 59–37	7
Canada; L 50–67	4 Q	Germany; L 44–55	5th–8th place semi-final China; L 55–72	7th/8th place match Mexico; W 59–37	7

Group play

Team	Pld	W	L	PF	PA	PD	Pts	Qualification
Australia	4	3	1	211	180	+31	7 (Note: head-to-head score differential: AUS: +2; NED: +2; CAN: −4) (Note: Netherlands and Australia have the same score difference but Australia won the match from the Netherlands (58–49))	Quarter-finals
Netherlands	4	3	1	236	194	+42	7	Quarter-finals
Canada	4	3	1	248	231	+17	7	Quarter-finals
Great Britain	4	1	3	151	217	−66	5	Quarter-finals
Brazil	4	0	4	190	214	−24	4	Eliminated

Rules for classification: 1) Table points, 2) Head-to-head score differential
Notes:

30 August 2012
13:00

Report

Netherlands	62–35	Great Britain
Scoring by quarter: 8–8, 12–6, 18–10, 24–11
Pts: Bejer 26; Rebs: Bejer 19; Asts: Huitzing 9		Pts: Conroy 15; Rebs: Freeman 12; Asts: Freeman 6

North Greenwich Arena, London
Referees: Max Kindervater (GER)

31 August 2012
13:00

Report

Great Britain	24–51	Australia
Scoring by quarter: 5–11, 6–14, 3–14, 10–12
Pts: Hamer 8 Rebs: Strange 7 Asts: three players 2		Pts: Merritt 10; Rebs: Crispin 7 Asts: Gauci 4

North Greenwich Arena, London
Referees: Nureddin Bilmez (TUR)

1 September 2012
13:00

Report

Brazil	37–42	Great Britain
Scoring by quarter: 5–9, 16–10, 10–8, 6–15
Pts: Guimarães da Costa 16; Rebs: De Nazaré Santos 11; Asts: Guimarães da Costa 3		Pts: Conroy 18; Rebs: Freeman 8 Asts: Freeman 11

Basketball Arena, London
Referees: Saskia Warmerdam (NED)

3 September 2012
13:00

Report

Great Britain	50–67	Canada
Scoring by quarter: 16–14, 9–20, 11–21, 14–12
Pts: Freeman 18; Rebs: Freeman, Conroy 7 Asts: Freeman 5		Pts: Harnock 20; Rebs: McLachlan 15; Asts: Ouellet, Ferguson 8

North Greenwich Arena, London
Referees: Valerie Farrugia (FRA)

Quarter-final

4 September 2012
19:00

Report

Germany	55–44	Great Britain
Scoring by quarter: 8–12, 14–9, 12–12, 21–11
Pts: Zeyen 25; Rebs: Schünemann 5 Asts: Schünemann 14		Pts: Freeman 19; Rebs: Sugden 7 Asts: Freeman 8

North Greenwich Arena, London
Referees: Sébastien Gauthier (CAN)

5th–8th place semi-final

6 September 2012
10:45

Report

China	72–55	Great Britain
Scoring by quarter: 17–10, 17–10, 15–11, 23–24
Pts: Cheng 19; Rebs: Cheng 14; Asts: Long 10		Pts: Freeman 22; Rebs: Freeman 9 Asts: Freeman 9

North Greenwich Arena, London
Referees: Matt Wells (AUS)

7th/8th place match

7 September 2012
8:30

Report

Mexico	37–59	Great Britain
Scoring by quarter: 11–6, 8–12, 7–22, 11–19
Pts: Estrada Bernal, Pérez Pacheco 9 Rebs: Pérez Pacheco 4 Asts: Estrada Bernal 6		Pts: Conroy 22; Rebs: Freeman 9 Asts: Freeman 9

North Greenwich Arena, London
Referees: Matt Wells (AUS)

== Wheelchair fencing ==
Great Britain named a squad of seven fencers competing across five events. The squad included 14-year-old Gabi Down as well as 1992 bronze medallist David Heaton who returned to the sport having retired after the 2004 Paralympics.

Tom Hall-Butcher advanced from the opening qualification pools but lost to Cheong Meng Chai of Hong Kong in the last 16 round. Justine Moore was eliminated in the qualification rounds in both the women's individual foil and épée events. Both men's and women's teams finished eighth without winning a match.

Athlete	Event	Qualification			Round of 16	Quarterfinal	Semifinal	Final / BM	
Athlete	Event	Opposition	Score	Rank	Opposition Score	Opposition Score	Opposition Score	Opposition Score	Rank
Tom Hall-Butcher	Men's individual sabre A	Tsedryk (UKR)	W 5–1	11 Q	Cheong (HKG); L 10–15	did not advance			
Tom Hall-Butcher	Men's individual sabre A	Noble (FRA)	L 1–5	11 Q	Cheong (HKG); L 10–15	did not advance			
Tom Hall-Butcher	Men's individual sabre A	Cheong (HKG)	L 4–5	11 Q	Cheong (HKG); L 10–15	did not advance			
Tom Hall-Butcher	Men's individual sabre A	Tian (CHN)	L 2–5	11 Q	Cheong (HKG); L 10–15	did not advance			
Justine Moore	Women's individual épée B	Makrytskaya (BLR)	W 5–2	11	—N/a	did not advance			
Justine Moore	Women's individual épée B	Briese-Baetke (GER)	L 1–5	11	—N/a	did not advance			
Justine Moore	Women's individual épée B	Jana (THA)	L 0–5	11	—N/a	did not advance			
Justine Moore	Women's individual épée B	Dani (HUN)	L 1–5	11	—N/a	did not advance			
Justine Moore	Women's individual épée B	Vasileva (RUS)	L 3–5	11	—N/a	did not advance			
Justine Moore	Women's individual foil B	Mishurova (RUS)	L 2–5	10	—N/a	did not advance			
Justine Moore	Women's individual foil B	Briese-Baetke (GER)	L 0–5	10	—N/a	did not advance			
Justine Moore	Women's individual foil B	Palfi (HUN)	W 5–4	10	—N/a	did not advance			
Justine Moore	Women's individual foil B	Zhou (CHN)	L 2–5	10	—N/a	did not advance			
Justine Moore	Women's individual foil B	Lukianenko (UKR)	L 4–5	10	—N/a	did not advance			
David Heaton; Craig McCann; Simon Wilson	Men's team open	—N/a				Hong Kong (HKG); L 19–45	Semi-final 5–8; Russia (RUS); L 15–45	Classification 7–8; Hungary (HUN); L 12–45	8
Gemma Collis; Gabi Down; Justine Moore	Women's team open	—N/a				Hong Kong (HKG); L 26–45	Semi-final 5–8; Russia (RUS); L 28–45	Classification 7–8; France (FRA); L 33–45	8

Note: Ranks from qualification pools were given as an overall ranking against all other competitors.

== Wheelchair rugby ==
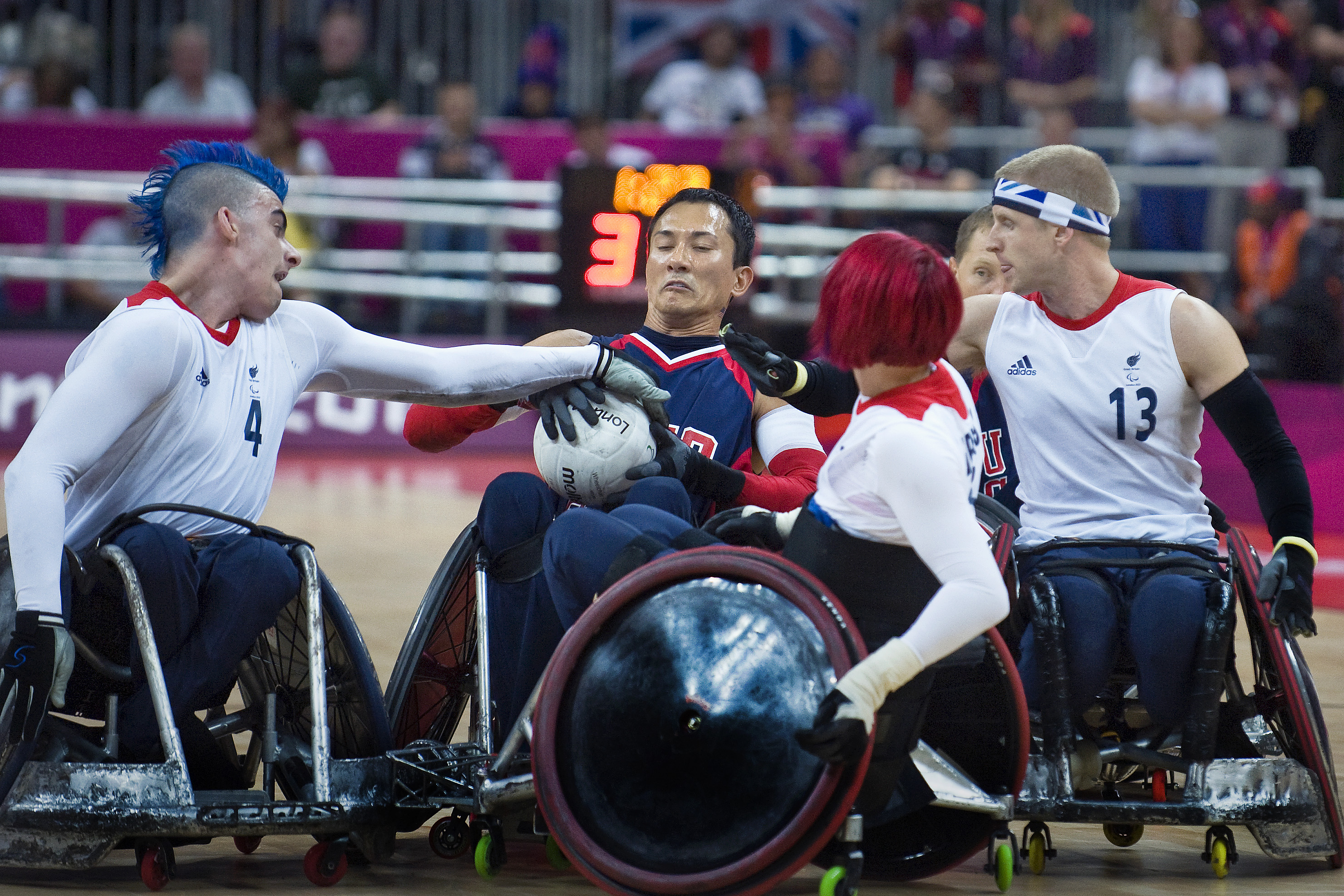
The British wheelchair rugby team in action against the United States in their opening match.

Great Britain qualified to compete in wheelchair rugby as host nation. A squad of 11 was named with five athletes returning from the 2008 Games, where the team finished fourth. The team did not advance to the semi-finals after defeats to the United States and Japan in the group stage. Britain went on to win their classification matches against Belgium and Sweden to finish in fifth place in the competition.

Squad list	Group stage		Semifinals	Finals	
Squad list	Opposition Result	Rank	Opposition Result	Opposition Result	Rank
From: David Anthony; Andy Barrow; Steve Brown; Jonny Coggan; Kylie Grimes; Bulbul Hussain; Mike Kerr; Ross Morrison; Myles Pearson; Aaron Phipps; Mandip Sehmi	United States; L 44–56	3	Semi-final 5–8; Belgium; W 54–49	Classification 5–6; Sweden; W 59–47	5
From: David Anthony; Andy Barrow; Steve Brown; Jonny Coggan; Kylie Grimes; Bulbul Hussain; Mike Kerr; Ross Morrison; Myles Pearson; Aaron Phipps; Mandip Sehmi	France; W 57–50	3	Semi-final 5–8; Belgium; W 54–49	Classification 5–6; Sweden; W 59–47	5
From: David Anthony; Andy Barrow; Steve Brown; Jonny Coggan; Kylie Grimes; Bulbul Hussain; Mike Kerr; Ross Morrison; Myles Pearson; Aaron Phipps; Mandip Sehmi	Japan; L 39–51	3	Semi-final 5–8; Belgium; W 54–49	Classification 5–6; Sweden; W 59–47	5

Group play

Team	Pld	W	D	L	GF	GA	GD	Pts	Qualification
United States (USA)	3	3	0	0	190	136	+54	6	Semifinals
Japan (JPN)	3	2	0	1	164	159	+5	4	Semifinals
Great Britain (GBR)	3	1	0	2	140	157	−17	2	Eliminated
France (FRA)	3	0	0	3	150	192	−42	0	Eliminated

5 September 2012
14:00

United States	56 – 44	Great Britain
Aoki – 14; Groulx – 9 Team – 7 McBride – 6 Sumner – 5 A. Cohn – 5 Scaturro – 3 Helton – 2 Delagrave – 2 Regier – 1 C. Cohn – 1 Springer – 1	Report	Phipps – 16; Anthony – 11; Brown – 5 Morrison – 5 Barrow – 3 Kerr – 2 Sehmi – 1 Team – 1

Basketball Arena
Attendance: 8,273
Referee: Pierre-Alexandre Brière (CAN), Chris van de Riet (NED)
6 September 2012
19:00

Great Britain	57 – 50	France
	Report

Basketball Arena
Attendance: 5,186
Referee: Motoko Izumiya (JPN), Darren Roberts (USA)
7 September 2012
15:00

Great Britain	39 – 51	Japan
	Report

Basketball Arena
Attendance: 8,458
Referee: Mitch Carr (USA), Philip Washbourn (NZL)

Semi-final 5–8

8 September 2012
14:00

Great Britain	54 – 49	Belgium
	Report

Basketball Arena
Attendance: 1,567
Referee: Pierre-Alexandre Brière (CAN), Philip Washbourn (NZL)

Classification 5–6

8 September 2012
21:15

Great Britain	59 – 47	Sweden
	Report

Basketball Arena
Attendance: 2,484
Referee: Mitch Carr (USA), Alexander Schreiner (GER)

== Wheelchair tennis ==
Of the ten athletes selected to compete in wheelchair tennis, seven had competed in 2008, including double Paralympic quad singles champion Peter Norfolk. In the singles events, no British competitor advanced past the quarter-final stage. Defending quad singles champion Peter Norfolk was defeated in the quarter-finals by Shraga Weinberg of Israel in three sets, while ninth seed Gordon Reid and eighth seed Lucy Shuker reached the quarter-finals in the men's singles and women's singles respectively.

Peter Norfolk and Andy Lapthorne won a silver medal in the quad doubles, losing the final against defending champions Nicholas Taylor and David Wagner of the US in three sets. Lucy Shuker and Jordanne Whiley won a bronze medal in the women's doubles having lost the first set and saved a match point in the bronze medal final against Thailand's Sakhorn Khanthasit and Ratana Techamaneewat.

Athlete (seed)	Event	Round of 64	Round of 32	Round of 16	Quarterfinals	Semifinals	Final / BM	
Athlete (seed)	Event	Opposition Score	Opposition Score	Opposition Score	Opposition Score	Opposition Score	Opposition Score	Rank
Alex Jewitt	Men's singles	Saida (JPN) (13); L 2–6, 0–6	did not advance					
David Phillipson	Men's singles	Dembe (CAN); W 6–2, 6–2	Legner (AUT) (15); W 6–3, 6–2	Kunieda (JPN) (2); L 0–6, 2–6	did not advance			
Marc McCarroll	Men's singles	Egberink (NED) (14); L 4–6, 3–6	did not advance					
Gordon Reid (9)	Men's singles	Miki (JPN); W 6–1, 6–2	Rodrigues (BRA); W 6–0, 6–0	Olsson (SWE) (6); W 7–5, 6–4	Scheffers (NED) (3); L 3–6, 3–6	did not advance		
Louise Hunt	Women's singles	—N/a	Kamiji (JPN); L 1–6, 1–6	did not advance				
Lucy Shuker (8)	Women's singles	—N/a	Lauro (ITA); W 6–2, 6–1	Kaiser (USA); W 6–0, 6–2	Griffioen (NED) (3); L 4–6, 2–6	did not advance		
Jordanne Whiley	Women's singles	—N/a	Khanthasit (THA); L 3–6, 4–6	did not advance				
Jamie Burdekin	Quad singles	—N/a		Gershony (ISR) (2); L 6–3, 3–6, 3–6	did not advance			
Andy Lapthorne (4)	Quad singles	—N/a		Hard (SWE); L 7–5, 3–6, 3–6	did not advance			
Peter Norfolk (3)	Quad singles	—N/a		Moroishi (JPN); W 6–0, 6–0	Weinberg (ISR); L 6–3, 5–7, 0–6	did not advance		
Alex Jewitt; David Phillipson	Men's doubles	—N/a	Avanthey, Pellegrina (SUI); W 6–3, 6–2	Houdet, Jérémiasz (FRA) (1); L 0–6, 2–6	did not advance			
Marc McCarroll; Gordon Reid (7)	Men's doubles	—N/a	Bedard, Dembe (CAN); W 6–3, 6–1	Denayer, Gérard (BEL); W 6–4, 6–3	Cattanéo, Peifer (FRA) (4); L 6–7^{(4–7)}, 4–6	did not advance		
Lucy Shuker; Jordanne Whiley (3)	Women's doubles	—N/a		Bye	Ellerbrock, Krüger (GER); W 6–3, 6–3	Griffioen, Van Koot (NED) (2); L 4–6, 3–6	Khanthasit, Techamaneewat (THA); W 6–7^{(8–10)}, 7–6^{(7–2)}, 6–3	3rd place, bronze medalist(s)
Andy Lapthorne; Peter Norfolk (1)	Quad doubles	—N/a			Bye	Kawano, Moroishi (JPN); W 6–2, 6–2	Taylor, Wagner (USA) (2); L 2–6, 7–5, 2–6	2nd place, silver medalist(s)

== Victory parade ==
A celebratory parade took place on 10 September 2012 commemorating the Olympic and Paralympic Games.

== See also ==
- 2012 Summer Paralympics
- Great Britain at the Paralympics
- Great Britain at the 2012 Summer Olympics
