= Simon Wilson (fencer) =

British Paralympic fencer

Simon Wilson PLY (born 17 October 1958) is a Paralympic wheelchair fencer.

He was a member of the men's foil team for Great Britain at the 2012 Summer Paralympics.
