= Rob Womack =

British Paralympic shot putter and discus thrower

Personal information
- Full name: Robin Womack
- Nationality: British
- Born: 29 May 1971 (age 55) Dewsbury, England

Sport
- Country: Great Britain
- Sport: Athletics
- Event(s): F55 Shot put F55 Discus
- Club: BWAA

Achievements and titles
- Paralympic finals: 2012
- Personal best(s): Shot Put: 11.34m Discus: 29.38m
Medal record
Representing Great Britain
Athletics
Paralympic Games
Bronze medal – third place	2012 London	Men's shot put F54/F55/F56

Robin "Rob" Womack (born 29 May 1971) is a Paralympian track and field athlete from England competing mainly in category F55 throwing events. In 2012 he qualified as a member of the Great Britain team for the 2012 Summer Paralympics in London and took the bronze medal in the shot put.

== Life history ==
Womack was born in Dewsbury, England in 1971. Womack, a paraplegic after having prolapsed disc in 2003, became involved in athletics during rehabilitation at the spinal unit at Stoke Mandeville. In 2006 Womack qualified for his first major tournament, representing Great Britain the IPC Athletics World Championships, held in Assen in the Netherlands. Despite this he was not selected for the 2008 Summer Paralympics in Beijing, much to Womack's disappointment.

Womack continued to compete throughout 2009, throwing a season's best of 10.66 in the shot put and 26.14 in the discus. His results in 2010 were an improvement on the previous season, and posted a distance of 10.87 in the National Championships in Nottingham. In 2011, Womack was part of the Great Britain team that travelled to Christchurch in New Zealand to compete in the 2011 IPC Athletics World Championships in the shot put. This was the first time Womack had represented Britain in three years, and he responded with a personal best of 10.93, leaving him in 7th place in the F54/55/56 category.

On the 7 July 2012, at a Stoke Mandeville meet, Womack recorded a distance in the shot of 11.01, his personal best and the first time he had thrown competitively over 11 metres. The result was good enough to see Womack selected for the Great Britain team for the 2012 Summer Paralympics in the shot put. In the final he threw a personal best of 11.34m to take the bronze medal.

Womack is married to Debbie, and has three children.
