= Dan Highcock =

British wheelchair basketball player

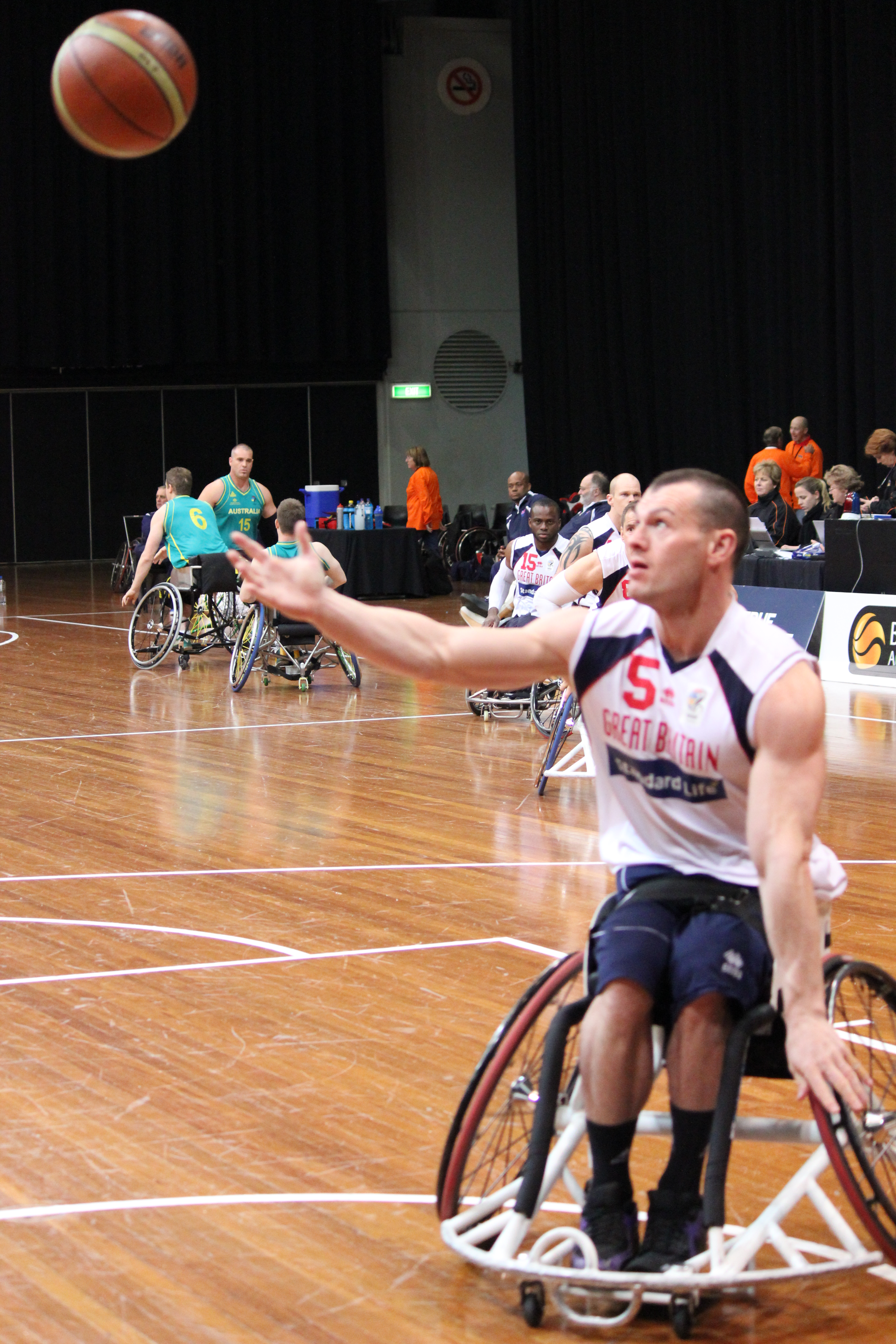
- Highcock at Gliders & Rollers World Challenge on 21 July 2012.

Personal information
- Nationality: United Kingdom
- Born: 5 December 1981 (age 44) St Helens, Merseyside

Sport
- Country: Germany
- Sport: Wheelchair basketball
- Event: Men's team
- Club: RSB Team Thüringen

Dan Highcock (born 5 December 1981) is a former British wheelchair basketball player. He was selected to play for Team GB in the 2012 Summer Paralympics in London.

== Personal life ==
Highcock was born on 5 December 1981 in St Helens, Merseyside. He was born with Avascular necrosis (a disease where there is necrosis of bone components due to interruption of the blood supply) from the hip.

== Wheelchair basketball ==
Highcock was introduced to wheelchair basketball by his physical education (PE) teacher at the age of 13, and has played ever since. He was selected for the 2000 Summer Paralympics in Sydney, but was dropped from the team shortly before they were meant to fly there. He was selected for the London 2012 Summer Paralympics after representing Great Britain at two World Championships. He first played for the Liverpool Meteors for five years. Since then he has played in Italian, Spanish, British and German wheelchair basketball teams.

Highcock played his first championship in 2005, the European Championships, held in Paris, France. He finished in second-place position, winning a silver. The following year, he participated in the 2006 World Championships, which were held in Amsterdam, in the Netherlands. Along with his team, he finished in fifth-place position. In the 2007 European Championships, in Wetzlar, Germany, he won silver. He participated in the 2009 European Championships held in Adana, Turkey, the following year. His team managed to get in bronze medal position. In the 2010 World Wheelchair Basketball Championships held in Birmingham, he was in fifth position along with his team. In the 2011 European Championships, held in Nazareth, Israel, there was a victory. Along with his team, he reached the gold medal position; winning the championship.
