= James Richmond (Paralympic footballer) =

British Paralympic footballer

James Richmond (born 1980) is a British Paralympic footballer.

Richmond is from Tullibody, Clackmannanshire, Scotland and has cerebral palsy. He represents Scotland as well as playing on the Great Britain Olympic team. He is a 'category 7' player.
