= Swimming at the 2004 Summer Paralympics – Women's 50 metre freestyle S10 =

Women's 50m Freestyle S10 at the XII Paralympic Games
- Paralympic Swimming
- Venue: Olympic Aquatic Centre
- Dates: 26 September 2004
- Competitors: 15 from 10 nations
- Winning time: 28.75

Medalists
| 1st place, gold medalist(s) | | Anne Polinario | Canada |
| 2nd place, silver medalist(s) | | Viera Mikulasikova | Slovakia |
| 3rd place, bronze medalist(s) | | Esther Morales | Spain |

The Women's 50 metre freestyle S10 swimming event at the 2004 Summer Paralympics was competed on 26 September. It was won by Anne Polinario, representing Canada clocking 29.75 seconds. The competition was held at the event's host city, Athens, Greece.

== 1st round ==
| Qualified for final round |

Heat 1

26 Sept. 2004, morning session

| Rank | Athlete | Time | Notes |
|---|---|---|---|
| 1 | Esther Morales Fernández (ESP) | 30.59 | |
| 2 | Kat Lewis (AUS) | 31.06 | |
| 3 | Ashley Owens (USA) | 31.21 | |
| 4 | Wang Shuai (CHN) | 31.51 | |
| 5 | Mia Juhl Mortensen (DEN) | 31.70 | |
| 6 | Katarzyna Pawlik (POL) | 32.79 | |
| 7 | Katarzyna Brzostowska (POL) | 33.42 | |

Heat 2

26 Sept. 2004, morning session

| Rank | Athlete | Time | Notes |
|---|---|---|---|
| 1 | Anne Polinario (CAN) | 29.07 | |
| 2 | Viera Mikulasikova (SVK) | 30.16 | |
| 3 | Magdalena Szczepińska (POL) | 31.08 | |
| 4 | Sarah Bailey MBE (GBR) | 31.09 | |
| 5 | Claudia Hengst (GER) | 31.76 | |
| 6 | Almudena de la Osa (ESP) | 32.03 | |
| 7 | Li Fang (CHN) | 32.64 | |
| 8 | Qian Hui Yu (CHN) | 33.05 | |

== Final round ==
26 Sept. 2004, evening session

| Rank | Athlete | Time | Notes |
|---|---|---|---|
| 1st place, gold medalist(s) | Anne Polinario (CAN) | 28.75 | |
| 2nd place, silver medalist(s) | Viera Mikulasikova (SVK) | 29.68 | |
| 3rd place, bronze medalist(s) | Esther Morales Fernández (ESP) | 30.41 | |
| 4 | Sarah Bailey MBE (GBR) | 30.74 | |
| 5 | Kat Lewis (AUS) | 30.82 | |
| 6 | Magdalena Szczepińska (POL) | 30.98 | |
| 7 | Ashley Owens (USA) | 31.11 | |
| 8 | Wang Shuai (CHN) | 31.17 | |
