= Swimming at the 2008 Summer Paralympics – Women's 50 metre freestyle S10 =

Women's 50m Freestyle S10 at the XIII Paralympic Games
- Venue: Beijing National Aquatics Center
- Dates: 14 September
- Competitors: 15 from 11 nations
- Winning time: 28.51

Medalists
1st place, gold medalist(s)		Anne Polinario	Canada
2nd place, silver medalist(s)		Katarzyna Pawlik	Poland
3rd place, bronze medalist(s)		Katrina Lewis	Australia

The women's 50m freestyle S10 event at the 2008 Summer Paralympics took place at the Beijing National Aquatics Center on 14 September. There were two heats; the swimmers with the eight fastest times advanced to the final.

== Results ==
=== Heats ===
Competed from 10:55.

==== Heat 1 ====
Rank	Name	Nationality	Time	Notes
1	Katrina Lewis	Australia	28.91	Q
2	Susan Beth Scott	United States	29.67	Q
3	Anna Eames	United States	29.78	Q
4	Esther Morales Fernández	Spain	29.94	Q
5	Tarryn McGaw	Australia	30.56	
6	Qian Huiyu	China	32.20	
7	Emma Cattle	Great Britain	32.59	

==== Heat 2 ====
Rank	Name	Nationality	Time	Notes
1	Anne Polinario	Canada	29.29	Q
2	Katarzyna Pawlik	Poland	29.31	Q
3	Elodie Lorandi	France	29.87	Q
4	Viera Mikulasikova	Slovakia	30.16	Q
5	Ashley Owens	United States	30.29	
6	Samantha Gandolfo	Australia	31.15	
7	Shireen Sapiro	South Africa	31.85	
8	Macarena Quero	Chile	34.78	

=== Final ===
Competed at 20:30.

Rank	Name	Nationality	Time	Notes
1st place, gold medalist(s)	Anne Polinario	Canada	28.51	
2nd place, silver medalist(s)	Katarzyna Pawlik	Poland	28.92	
3rd place, bronze medalist(s)	Katrina Lewis	Australia	29.13	
4	Anna Eames	United States	29.17	
5	Susan Beth Scott	United States	29.38	
6	Elodie Lorandi	France	29.59	
7	Esther Morales Fernández	Spain	29.75	
8	Viera Mikulasikova	Slovakia	29.94	

Q = qualified for final.
