= Swimming at the 2004 Summer Paralympics – Women's 400 metre freestyle S10 =

Women's 400m Freestyle S10 at the XII Paralympic Games
- Paralympic Swimming
- Venue: Olympic Aquatic Centre
- Dates: 24 September 2004
- Competitors: 10 from 8 nations
- Winning time: 4:51.08

Medalists
| 1st place, gold medalist(s) | | Katarzyna Pawlik | Poland |
| 2nd place, silver medalist(s) | | Claudia Hengst | Germany |
| 3rd place, bronze medalist(s) | | Ashley Owens | United States |

The Women's 400 metre freestyle S10 swimming event at the 2004 Summer Paralympics was competed on 24 September. It was won by Katarzyna Pawlik, representing Poland.

== 1st round ==
| Qualified for final round |

Heat 1

24 September 2004, morning session

| Rank | Athlete | Time | Notes |
|---|---|---|---|
| 1 | Ashley Owens (USA) | 5:00.17 | |
| 2 | Katarzyna Pawlik (POL) | 5:00.25 | |
| 3 | Claudia Hengst (GER) | 5:02.41 | |
| 4 | Viera Mikulasikova (SVK) | 5:13.29 | |
| 5 | Hannah MacDougall (AUS) | 5:22.33 | |

Heat 2

24 September 2004, morning session

| Rank | Athlete | Time | Notes |
|---|---|---|---|
| 1 | Kat Lewis (AUS) | 5:07.47 | |
| 2 | Mia Juhl Mortensen (DEN) | 5:11.23 | |
| 3 | Sarah Bailey MBE (GBR) | 5:15.03 | |
| 4 | Katarzyna Brzostowska (POL) | 5:17.32 | |
| 5 | Theresa Griffin (NZL) | 5:21.40 | |

== Final round ==
24 September 2004, evening session

| Rank | Athlete | Time | Notes |
|---|---|---|---|
| 1st place, gold medalist(s) | Katarzyna Pawlik (POL) | 4:51.08 | |
| 2nd place, silver medalist(s) | Claudia Hengst (GER) | 4:53.55 | |
| 3rd place, bronze medalist(s) | Ashley Owens (USA) | 4:57.77 | |
| 4 | Kat Lewis (AUS) | 5:03.48 | |
| 5 | Sarah Bailey MBE (GBR) | 5:07.08 | |
| 6 | Mia Juhl Mortensen (DEN) | 5:11.30 | |
| 7 | Viera Mikulasikova (SVK) | 5:14.33 | |
| 8 | Katarzyna Brzostowska (POL) | 5:21.01 | |
