= Swimming at the 2012 Summer Paralympics – Women's 200 metre freestyle S14 =

Women's 200m Freestyle S14 at the XIV Paralympic Games
- Venue: London Aquatics Centre
- Dates: 2 September
- Competitors: 21 from 14 nations
- Winning time: 2:12.63

Medalists
1st place, gold medalist(s)		Jessica-Jane Applegate	Great Britain
2nd place, silver medalist(s)		Taylor Corry	Australia
3rd place, bronze medalist(s)		Marlou van der Kulk	Netherlands

The women's 200m freestyle S14 event at the 2012 Summer Paralympics took place at the London Aquatics Centre on 2 September. There were three heats; the swimmers with the eight fastest times advanced to the final.

== Results ==
=== Heats ===
Competed from 10:07.

==== Heat 1 ====
Rank	Lane	Name	Nationality	Time	Notes
1	4	Jessica-Jane Applegate	Great Britain	2:14.31	Q, PR
2	5	Kayla Clarke	Australia	2:16.52	Q
3	3	Kara Leo	Australia	2:17.28	Q
4	2	Michelle Alonso Morales	Spain	2:23.37	
5	6	Jana Murphy	Canada	2:26.44	
6	7	Mariana Diaz de la Vega Parra	Mexico	2:33.09	
7	1	Alicia Mandin	France	2:41.50	

==== Heat 2 ====
Rank	Lane	Name	Nationality	Time	Notes
1	4	Taylor Corry	Australia	2:14.99	Q
2	3	Magda Toeters	Netherlands	2:17.11	Q
3	5	Chloe Davies	Great Britain	2:18.10	
4	6	Leung Shu Hang	Hong Kong	2:21.51	
5	7	Kolbrun Alda Stefansdottir	Iceland	2:24.57	
6	2	Tamara Medarts	Belgium	2:30.10	
7	1	Tu Jo-lin	Chinese Taipei	2:43.29	

==== Heat 3 ====
Rank	Lane	Name	Nationality	Time	Notes
1	4	Marlou van der Kulk	Netherlands	2:14.43	Q
2	5	Natalie Massey	Great Britain	2:16.21	Q
3	6	Pernilla Lindberg	Sweden	2:16.39	Q
4	2	Kirstie Kasko	Canada	2:27.25	
5	7	Chow Yuen Ying	Hong Kong	2:31.95	
6	1	Adela Mikova	Czech Republic	2:32.06	
7	8	Jessica Silvana Lalama Vega	Ecuador	2:45.06	

=== Final ===
Competed at 17:56.

Rank	Lane	Name	Nationality	Time	Notes
1st place, gold medalist(s)	4	Jessica-Jane Applegate	Great Britain	2:12.63	PR
2nd place, silver medalist(s)	3	Taylor Corry	Australia	2:13.18	
3rd place, bronze medalist(s)	5	Marlou van der Kulk	Netherlands	2:14.80	
4	7	Kayla Clarke	Australia	2:15.29	
5	2	Pernilla Lindberg	Sweden	2:15.33	
6	6	Natalie Massey	Great Britain	2:15.35	
7	1	Magda Toeters	Netherlands	2:17.70	
8	8	Kara Leo	Australia	2:18.04	

'Q = qualified for final. PR = Paralympic Record.
