= Swimming at the 2008 Summer Paralympics – Women's 100 metre freestyle S10 =

Women's 100m Freestyle S10 at the XIII Paralympic Games
- Venue: Beijing National Aquatics Center
- Dates: 9 September
- Competitors: 13 from 8 nations
- Winning time: 1:01.57

Medalists
1st place, gold medalist(s)		Ashley Owens	United States
2nd place, silver medalist(s)		Katarzyna Pawlik	Poland
3rd place, bronze medalist(s)		Anna Eames	United States

The women's 100m freestyle S10 event at the 2008 Summer Paralympics took place at the Beijing National Aquatics Center on 9 September. There were two heats; the swimmers with the eight fastest times advanced to the final.

== Results ==
=== Heats ===
Competed from 09:34.

==== Heat 1 ====
Rank	Name	Nationality	Time	Notes
1	Katarzyna Pawlik	Poland	1:01.60	Q, WR
2	Anna Eames	United States	1:03.58	Q
3	Esther Morales Fernández	Spain	1:04.25	Q
4	Tarryn McGaw	Australia	1:05.03	Q
5	Samantha Gandolfo	Australia	1:05.12	Q
6	Shireen Sapiro	South Africa	1:08.50	

==== Heat 2 ====
Rank	Name	Nationality	Time	Notes
1	Susan Beth Scott	United States	1:02.93	Q
2	Ashley Owens	United States	1:03.59	Q
3	Anne Polinario	Canada	1:04.00	Q
4	Sophie Pascoe	New Zealand	1:05.90	
5	Viera Mikulasikova	Slovakia	1:06.57	
6	Sian Lucas	Australia	1:07.05	
7	Anna Omielan	Poland	1:08.15	

=== Final ===
Competed at 17:39.

Rank	Name	Nationality	Time	Notes
1st place, gold medalist(s)	Ashley Owens	United States	1:01.57	WR
2nd place, silver medalist(s)	Katarzyna Pawlik	Poland	1:01.59	
3rd place, bronze medalist(s)	Anna Eames	United States	1:01.91	
4	Susan Beth Scott	United States	1:02.33	
5	Anne Polinario	Canada	1:04.01	
6	Esther Morales Fernández	Spain	1:04.20	
7	Tarryn McGaw	Australia	1:04.83	
8	Samantha Gandolfo	Australia	1:05.74	

Q = qualified for final. WR = World Record.
