= Swimming at the 2004 Summer Paralympics – Women's 100 metre freestyle S10 =

Women's 100m Freestyle S10 at the XII Paralympic Games
- Paralympic Swimming
- Venue: Olympic Aquatic Centre
- Dates: 21 September 2004
- Competitors: 13 from 9 nations
- Winning time: 1:03.65

Medalists
1st place, gold medalist(s)		Anne Polinario	Canada
2nd place, silver medalist(s)		Katarzyna Pawlik	Poland
3rd place, bronze medalist(s)		Sarah Bailey MBE	Great Britain

The Women's 100 metre freestyle S10 swimming event at the 2004 Summer Paralympics was competed on 21 September. It was won by Anne Polinario, representing Canada.

== 1st round ==
Qualified for final round

Heat 1

21 Sept. 2004, morning session

Rank	Athlete	Time	Notes
1	Anne Polinario (CAN)	1:03.64	
2	Katarzyna Pawlik (POL)	1:05.35	
3	Kat Lewis (AUS)	1:07.39	
4	Claudia Hengst (GER)	1:07.71	
5	Katarzyna Brzostowska (POL)	1:11.53	
6	Almudena de la Osa (ESP)	1:11.75	

Heat 2

21 Sept. 2004, morning session

Rank	Athlete	Time	Notes
1	Sarah Bailey MBE (GBR)	1:06.32	
2	Ashley Owens (USA)	1:06.49	
3	Viera Mikulášiková (SVK)	1:06.57	
4	Esther Morales Fernández (ESP)	1:07.02	
5	Magdalena Szczepińska (POL)	1:08.79	
6	Mia Juhl Mortensen (DEN)	1:08.95	
7	Hannah MacDougall (AUS)	1:11.99	

== Final round ==
21 Sept. 2004, evening session

Rank	Athlete	Time	Notes
1st place, gold medalist(s)	Anne Polinario (CAN)	1:03.65	
2nd place, silver medalist(s)	Katarzyna Pawlik (POL)	1:04.46	
3rd place, bronze medalist(s)	Sarah Bailey MBE (GBR)	1:05.14	
4	Esther Morales Fernández (ESP)	1:05.91	
5	Viera Mikulášiková (SVK)	1:06.20	
6	Ashley Owens (USA)	1:06.27	
7	Kat Lewis (AUS)	1:06.70	
8	Claudia Hengst (GER)	1:07.24	
