= Marlou van der Kulk =

Dutch Paralympic swimmer

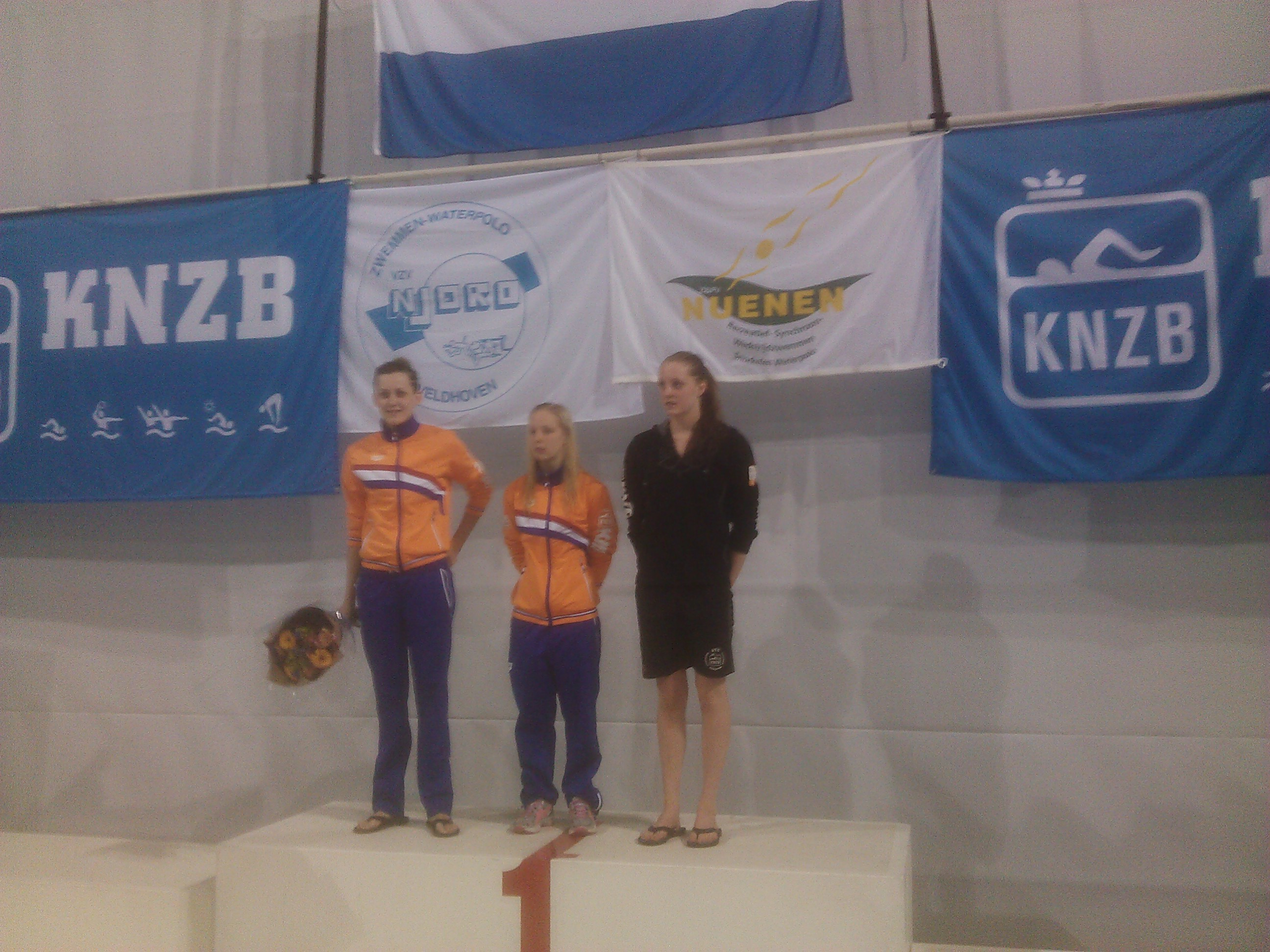
- (middle) NK Club 2014 - recordhouders

Personal information
- Nationality: Dutch
- Born: 9 September 1993 (age 32) Huizen, Netherlands

Sport
- Sport: Swimming
- Strokes: freestyle backstroke breaststroke
- Club: AZ and PC Amersfoort
- Coach: Mark Faber
Medal record
Swimming
Representing Netherlands
Paralympic Games
Bronze medal – third place	2012 London	100m backstroke
Bronze medal – third place	2012 London	200m freestyle
IPC World Championships
Gold medal – first place	2010 Eindhoven	100m backstroke
Gold medal – first place	2010 Eindhoven	200m freestyle
Gold medal – first place	2013 Montreal	100m backstroke
Gold medal – first place	2013 Montreal	200m medley SM14
Bronze medal – third place	2015 Glasgow	200m freestyle
Bronze medal – third place	2015 Glasgow	200m medley SM14
IPC European Championships
Silver medal – second place	2014 Eindhoven	100m backstroke
Silver medal – second place	2014 Eindhoven	200m medley
Bronze medal – third place	2009 Reykjavik	100m backstroke
Bronze medal – third place	2009 Reykjavik	2009 IPC Swimming

Marlou van der Kulk (born 9 September 1993) is a Dutch Paralympic swimmer. She competed in the 2012 Summer Paralympics in London, winning two bronze medals. Van der Kulk has also competed in two IPC Swimming World Championships winning four gold medals.

== Career history ==
Van der Kulk was born on 9 September 1993 in Huizen, Netherlands. She started swimming at the age of 12, and began competitive swimming while still in high school. Classified as an S14 swimmer, for athletes with an intellectual impairment, she was part of the Netherlands team chosen to compete on home soil at Eindhoven for the 2010 IPC Swimming World Championships. Entered in her favoured 100m backstroke and 200m freestyle, she took both events making her a double gold medal world champion at the age of 16.

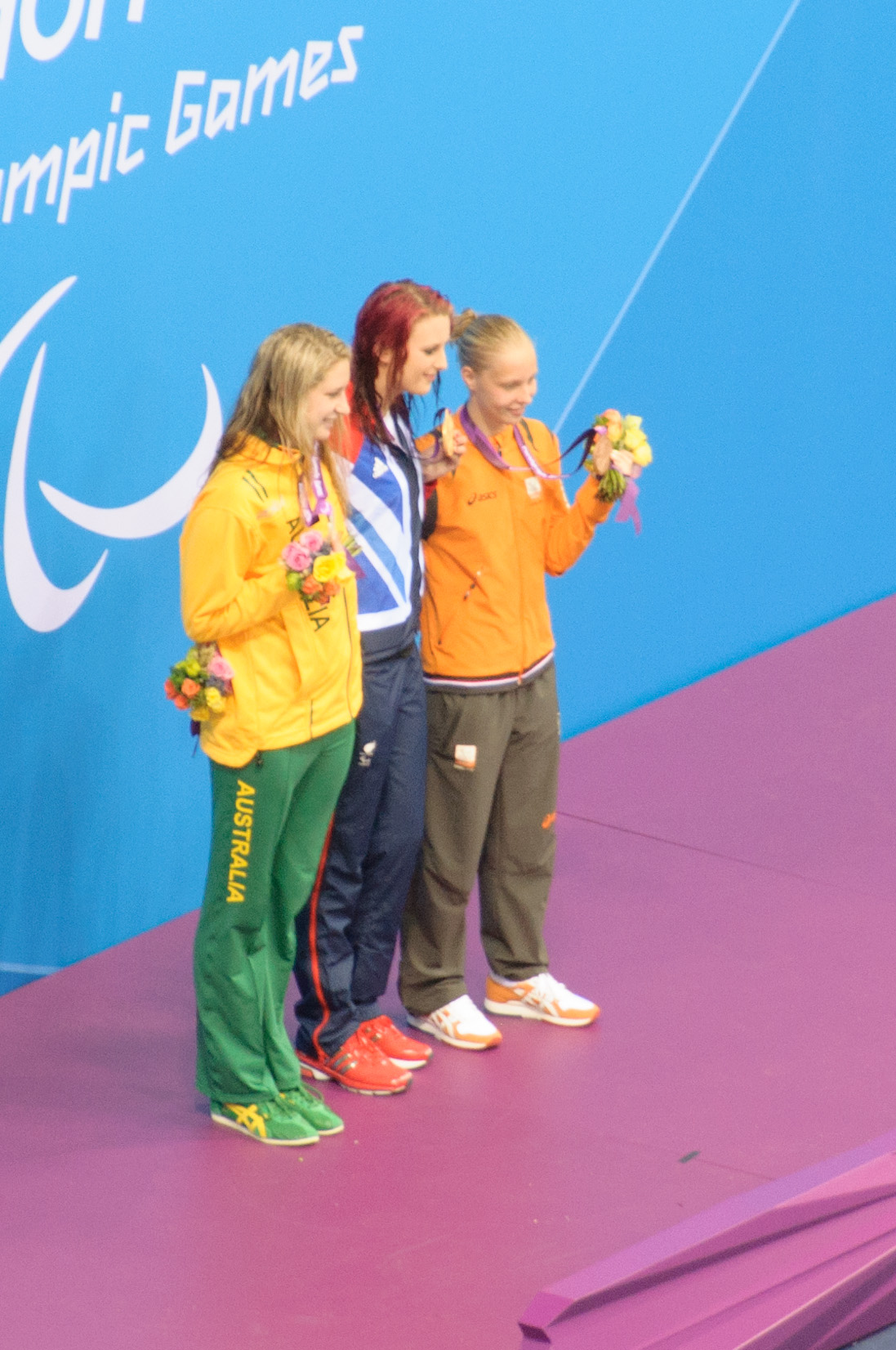
van der Kulk (in orange top) displaying her 200m freestyle bronze medal at the 2012 Paralympics

Two years later van der Kulk was back representing the Netherlands, this time in London for the 2012 Summer Paralympics. In her first event, the 100m backstroke, she posted a time of 1:09.98, coming in second to Britain's Chloe Davies, but her time was good enough for her to qualify for the final. In the final later that evening she swam an improved time of 1:09.50 just 4 hundredths of a second behind second placed Taylor Corry, to give van der Kulk the bronze, her first Paralympic medal. Two days later in the 200m freestyle she won her heat with a time of 2:14.43. In the final van der Kulk swam slightly slower with a time of 2:14.80, but it was enough to push Australia's Kayla Clarke into fourth place to give van der Kulk her second Paralympic bronze. Her final event was the 100m breaststroke. By winning the first heat in the inaugural SB14 100m backstroke, van der Kulk, by default, set a new Paralympic record. This record was short-lived being taken from her moments later in the second heat by teammate Magda Toeters. In the final, van der Kulk came sixth.

In her second World Championships, in 2013 in Montreal she entered four events. She took two medals, both gold. She retained her 100m backstroke title won in Eindhoven and also won the 200m medley, but she could only manage a fourth in the 200m freestyle.
