= Swimming at the 2012 Summer Paralympics – Women's 100 metre backstroke S14 =

Women's 100m Backstroke S14 at the XIV Paralympic Games
- Venue: London Aquatics Centre
- Dates: 31 August
- Competitors: 18 from 12 nations
- Winning time: 1:08.93

Medalists
| 1st place, gold medalist(s) | | Bethany Firth | Ireland |
| 2nd place, silver medalist(s) | | Taylor Corry | Australia |
| 3rd place, bronze medalist(s) | | Marlou van der Kulk | Netherlands |

The women's 100m backstroke S14 event at the 2012 Summer Paralympics took place at the London Aquatics Centre on 31 August. There were three heats; the swimmers with the eight fastest times advanced to the final.

== Results ==
=== Heats ===
Competed from 11:18.

==== Heat 1 ====
| Rank | Lane | Name | Nationality | Time | Notes |
|---|---|---|---|---|---|
| 1 | 4 | Kayla Clarke | Australia | 1:11.29 | Q, PR |
| 2 | 5 | Taylor Corry | Australia | 1:11.70 | Q |
| 3 | 3 | Kara Leo | Australia | 1:17.15 | |
| 4 | 6 | Kirstie Kasko | Canada | 1:19.84 | |
| 5 | 2 | Kolbrun Alda Stefansdottir | Iceland | 1:21.61 | |
| 6 | 7 | Adela Mikova | Czech Republic | 1:26.06 | |

==== Heat 2 ====
| Rank | Lane | Name | Nationality | Time | Notes |
|---|---|---|---|---|---|
| 1 | 5 | Jessica-Jane Applegate | Great Britain | 1:10.32 | Q, PR |
| 2 | 4 | Bethany Firth | Ireland | 1:10.33 | Q |
| 3 | 3 | Leung Shu Hang | Hong Kong | 1:14.09 | Q |
| 4 | 2 | Pernilla Lindberg | Sweden | 1:18.38 | |
| 5 | 6 | Tamara Medarts | Belgium | 1:20.61 | |
| 6 | 7 | Mariana Diaz de la Vega Parra | Mexico | 1:24.26 | |

==== Heat 3 ====
| Rank | Lane | Name | Nationality | Time | Notes |
|---|---|---|---|---|---|
| 1 | 5 | Chloe Davies | Great Britain | 1:09.22 | Q, PR |
| 2 | 4 | Marlou van der Kulk | Netherlands | 1:09.98 | Q |
| 3 | 3 | Natalie Massey | Great Britain | 1:11.89 | Q |
| 4 | 6 | Chow Yuen Ying | Hong Kong | 1:18.79 | |
| 5 | 7 | Michelle Alonso Morales | Spain | 1:22.71 | |
| | 2 | Jana Murphy | Canada | DNS | |

=== Final ===
Competed at 19:38.

| Rank | Lane | Name | Nationality | Time | Notes |
|---|---|---|---|---|---|
| 1st place, gold medalist(s) | 6 | Bethany Firth | Ireland | 1:08.93 | PR |
| 2nd place, silver medalist(s) | 7 | Taylor Corry | Australia | 1:09.46 | |
| 3rd place, bronze medalist(s) | 5 | Marlou van der Kulk | Netherlands | 1:09.50 | |
| 4 | 3 | Jessica-Jane Applegate | Great Britain | 1:09.58 | |
| 5 | 4 | Chloe Davies | Great Britain | 1:10.10 | |
| 6 | 2 | Kayla Clarke | Australia | 1:11.04 | |
| 7 | 1 | Natalie Massey | Great Britain | 1:12.87 | |
| 8 | 8 | Leung Shu Hang | Hong Kong | 1:13.44 | |

'Q = qualified for final. PR = Paralympic Record. DNS = Did not start.
