= Swimming at the 2004 Summer Paralympics – Women's 100 metre butterfly S10 =

Women's 100m Butterfly S10 at the XII Paralympic Games
- Paralympic Swimming
- Venue: Olympic Aquatic Centre
- Dates: 20 September 2004
- Competitors: 9 from 7 nations
- Winning time: 1:12.30

Medalists
| 1st place, gold medalist(s) | | Magdalena Szczepinska | Poland |
| 2nd place, silver medalist(s) | | Katarzyna Pawlik | Poland |
| 3rd place, bronze medalist(s) | | Claudia Hengst | Germany |

The Women's 100 metre butterfly S10 swimming event at the 2004 Summer Paralympics was competed on 20 September. It was won by Magdalena Szczepinska, representing Poland.

== 1st round ==
| Qualified for final round |

Heat 1

20 Sept. 2004, morning session

| Rank | Athlete | Time | Notes |
|---|---|---|---|
| 1 | Claudia Hengst (GER) | 1:14.91 | |
| 2 | Esther Morales Fernández (ESP) | 1:20.81 | |
| 3 | Qian Hui Yu (CHN) | 1:21.66 | |
| 4 | Li Fang (CHN) | 1:38.61 | |

Heat 2

20 Sept. 2004, morning session

| Rank | Athlete | Time | Notes |
|---|---|---|---|
| 1 | Katarzyna Pawlik (POL) | 1:12.64 | |
| 2 | Magdalena Szczepinska (POL) | 1:13.69 | |
| 3 | Mikhaila Rutherford (USA) | 1:16.89 | |
| 4 | Kat Lewis (AUS) | 1:20.98 | |
| 5 | Theresa Griffin (NZL) | 1:25.77 | |

== Final round ==
20 Sept. 2004, evening session

| Rank | Athlete | Time | Notes |
|---|---|---|---|
| 1st place, gold medalist(s) | Magdalena Szczepinska (POL) | 1:12.30 | |
| 2nd place, silver medalist(s) | Katarzyna Pawlik (POL) | 1:13.06 | |
| 3rd place, bronze medalist(s) | Claudia Hengst (GER) | 1:14.66 | |
| 4 | Mikhaila Rutherford (USA) | 1:17.96 | |
| 5 | Kat Lewis (AUS) | 1:19.93 | |
| 6 | Esther Morales Fernández (ESP) | 1:20.73 | |
| 7 | Qian Hui Yu (CHN) | 1:22.51 | |
| 8 | Theresa Griffin (NZL) | 1:25.68 | |
