= Swimming at the 2008 Summer Paralympics – Women's 200 metre individual medley SM10 =

Women's 200m Individual Medley SM10 at the XIII Paralympic Games
- Venue: Beijing National Aquatics Center
- Dates: 11 September
- Competitors: 14 from 9 nations
- Winning time: 2:35.21

Medalists
1st place, gold medalist(s)		Sophie Pascoe	New Zealand
2nd place, silver medalist(s)		Elodie Lorandi	France
3rd place, bronze medalist(s)		Katarzyna Pawlik	Poland

The women's 200m individual medley SM10 event at the 2008 Summer Paralympics took place at the Beijing National Aquatics Center on 11 September. There were two heats; the swimmers with the eight fastest times advanced to the final.

== Results ==
=== Heats ===
Competed from 10:40.

==== Heat 1 ====
Rank	Name	Nationality	Time	Notes
1	Elodie Lorandi	France	2:40.73	Q
2	Anna Eames	United States	2:43.21	Q
3	Viera Mikulasikova	Slovakia	2:44.06	Q
4	Susan Beth Scott	United States	2:45.39	Q
5	Tarryn McGaw	Australia	2:45.89	Q
6	Ana Rubio Zavala	Spain	2:58.17	
	Anna Omielan	Poland		DQ

==== Heat 2 ====
Rank	Name	Nationality	Time	Notes
1	Sophie Pascoe	New Zealand	2:39.40	Q
2	Katarzyna Pawlik	Poland	2:42.38	Q
3	Maud Didier	France	2:48.18	Q
4	Samantha Gandolfo	Australia	2:49.45	
5	Hannah MacDougall	Australia	2:53.34	
6	Cai Hongmei	China	2:53.82	
	Emma Cattle	Great Britain		DQ

=== Final ===
Competed at 19:32.

Rank	Name	Nationality	Time	Notes
1st place, gold medalist(s)	Sophie Pascoe	New Zealand	2:35.21	
2nd place, silver medalist(s)	Elodie Lorandi	France	2:39.28	
3rd place, bronze medalist(s)	Katarzyna Pawlik	Poland	2:40.41	
4	Viera Mikulasikova	Slovakia	2:40.43	
5	Anna Eames	United States	2:42.46	
6	Susan Beth Scott	United States	2:43.99	
7	Tarryn McGaw	Australia	2:46.57	
8	Maud Didier	France	2:47.62	

Q = qualified for final. DQ = Disqualified.
