= Swimming at the 2008 Summer Paralympics – Women's 100 metre backstroke S10 =

Women's 100m Backstroke S10 at the XIII Paralympic Games
- Venue: Beijing National Aquatics Center
- Dates: 13 September
- Competitors: 15 from 10 nations
- Winning time: 1:10.57

Medalists
1st place, gold medalist(s)		Sophie Pascoe	New Zealand
1st place, gold medalist(s)		Shireen Sapiro	South Africa
3rd place, bronze medalist(s)		Esther Morales Fernández	Spain

The women's 100m backstroke S10 event at the 2008 Summer Paralympics took place at the Beijing National Aquatics Center on 13 September. There were two heats; the swimmers with the eight fastest times advanced to the final. The final ended in a dead heat for first place, and two gold medals were awarded.

== Results ==
=== Heats ===
Competed from 09:58.

==== Heat 1 ====
Rank	Name	Nationality	Time	Notes
1	Sophie Pascoe	New Zealand	1:11.26	Q
2	Emma Cattle	Great Britain	1:14.05	Q
3	Susan Beth Scott	United States	1:14.09	Q
4	Elodie Lorandi	France	1:18.05	
5	Anne Polinario	Canada	1:18.06	
6	Anna Omielan	Poland	1:20.85	
	Wang Shuai	China		DQ

==== Heat 2 ====
Rank	Name	Nationality	Time	Notes
1	Shireen Sapiro	South Africa	1:13.04	Q
2	Sian Lucas	Australia	1:14.64	Q
3	Esther Morales Fernández	Spain	1:14.85	Q
4	Tarryn McGaw	Australia	1:16.58	Q
5	Katarzyna Pawlik	Poland	1:17.08	Q
6	Hannah MacDougall	Australia	1:17.87	
7	Cai Hongmei	China	1:18.30	
8	Maud Didier	France	1:20.84	

=== Final ===
Competed at 18:34.

Rank	Name	Nationality	Time	Notes
1st place, gold medalist(s)	Sophie Pascoe	New Zealand	1:10.57	WR
1st place, gold medalist(s)	Shireen Sapiro	South Africa	1:10.57	WR
3rd place, bronze medalist(s)	Esther Morales Fernández	Spain	1:13.77	
4	Susan Beth Scott	United States	1:13.97	
5	Sian Lucas	Australia	1:14.66	
6	Emma Cattle	Great Britain	1:14.68	
7	Tarryn McGaw	Australia	1:15.66	
8	Katarzyna Pawlik	Poland	1:20.08	

Q = qualified for final. WR = World Record. DQ = Disqualified.
