= Swimming at the 2012 Summer Paralympics – Women's 100 metre breaststroke SB14 =

Women's paralympic swimming event

Women's 100m Breaststroke SB14 at the XIV Paralympic Games
- Venue: London Aquatics Centre
- Dates: 6 September
- Competitors: 19 from 14 nations
- Winning time: 1:16.85

Medalists
1st place, gold medalist(s)		Michelle Alonso Morales	Spain
2nd place, silver medalist(s)		Magda Toeters	Netherlands
3rd place, bronze medalist(s)		Leung Shu Hang	Hong Kong

The women's 100m breaststroke SB14 event at the 2012 Summer Paralympics took place at the London Aquatics Centre on 6 September. There were three heats; the swimmers with the eight fastest times advanced to the final.

== Results ==
=== Heats ===
Competed from 10:32.

==== Heat 1 ====
Rank	Lane	Name	Nationality	Time	Notes
1	5	Marlou van der Kulk	Netherlands	1:23.45	Q, PR
2	3	Natalie Massey	Great Britain	1:26.56	
3	6	Pernilla Lindberg	Sweden	1:27.50	
4	2	Chow Yuen Ying	Hong Kong	1:30.28	
5	7	Adela Mikova	Czech Republic	1:33.57	
	4	Bethany Firth	Ireland	DNS	

==== Heat 2 ====
Rank	Lane	Name	Nationality	Time	Notes
1	4	Magda Toeters	Netherlands	1:20.51	Q, PR
2	3	Kayla Clarke	Australia	1:23.36	Q
3	5	Tamara Medarts	Belgium	1:23.51	Q
4	6	Mariana Diaz de la Vega Parra	Mexico	1:26.72	
5	2	Kirstie Kasko	Canada	1:27.90	
6	7	Tu Jo-lin	Chinese Taipei	1:40.49	

==== Heat 3 ====
Rank	Lane	Name	Nationality	Time	Notes
1	4	Michelle Alonso Morales	Spain	1:18.78	Q, PR
2	5	Leung Shu Hang	Hong Kong	1:21.96	Q
3	3	Amanda Fowler	Australia	1:24.79	Q
4	6	Alicia Mandin	France	1:25.62	Q
5	7	Kolbrun Alda Stefansdottir	Iceland	1:30.58	
6	1	Taylor Corry	Australia	1:30.89	
6	2	Jana Murphy	Canada	1:30.89	

=== Final ===
Competed at 18:31.

Rank	Lane	Name	Nationality	Time	Notes
1st place, gold medalist(s)	4	Michelle Alonso Morales	Spain	1:16.85	WR
2nd place, silver medalist(s)	5	Magda Toeters	Netherlands	1:20.64	
3rd place, bronze medalist(s)	3	Leung Shu Hang	Hong Kong	1:21.21	
4	6	Kayla Clarke	Australia	1:22.87	
5	1	Amanda Fowler	Australia	1:23.30	
6	2	Marlou van der Kulk	Netherlands	1:24.43	
7	7	Tamara Medarts	Belgium	1:24.58	
8	8	Alicia Mandin	France	1:25.51	

'Q = qualified for final. WR = World Record. PR = Paralympic Record. DNS = Did not start.
