= Polinario =

Polinario is a surname. Notable people with the surname include:

- Anne Polinario (born 1979), Canadian para swimmer
- Manuel Polinario (born 1943), Spanish former football player and manager
- Rafael Polinario (1959–2017), Cuban-Canadian swimmer and coach
