= 2010 IPC Swimming World Championships =

International para swimming competition

4th IPC Swimming World Championships
- Host city: Eindhoven, Netherlands
- Date: 14–21 August
- Venue: Pieter van den Hoogenband Swimming Stadium
- Nations: 53
- Athletes: 649
- Events: 181

The 2010 IPC Swimming World Championships was the sixth edition of the IPC Swimming World Championships, an international swimming competition, the biggest meet for athletes with a disability since the 2008 Summer Paralympics. It was held in Eindhoven, Netherlands and lasted from 14 to 21 August.

== Venue ==

The Championship was staged at the Pieter van den Hoogenband Swimming Stadium located in the south of Eindhoven. The complex contains three outdoor swimming pools.

== Events ==
=== Classification ===
Athletes are allocated a classification for each event based upon their disability to allow fairer competition between athletes of similar ability. The classifications for swimming are:

- Visual impairment
  - S11-S13
- Other disability
  - S1-S10 (Freestyle, backstroke and butterfly)
  - SB1-SB9 (breaststroke)
  - SM1-SM10 (individual medley)

Classifications run from S1 (severely disabled) to S10 (minimally disabled) for athletes with physical disabilities, and S11 (totally blind) to S13 (legally blind) for visually impaired athletes. Blind athletes must use blackened goggles.

== Medalists ==
=== Men ===
Event	Gold		Silver		Bronze	
50 m freestyle S1	Itzhak Mamistvalov; Israel	1:08.22	Christos Tampaxis; Greece	1:21.45	João Martins; Portugal	1:39.16
50 m freestyle S2	Dmitry Kokarev; Russia	1:02.72	Jacek Czech; Poland	1:06.01	James Anderson; Great Britain	1:07.34
50 m freestyle S3	Dmytro Vynohradets; Ukraine	44.53	Li Hanhua; China	44.54	Andrey Meshcheryakov; Russia	49.46
50 m freestyle S4	David Smétanine; France	38.26	Richard Oribe; Spain	39.07	Gustavo Sánchez Martínez; Mexico	40.76
50 m freestyle S5	Daniel Dias; Brazil	32.27	Sebastián Rodríguez Veloso; Spain	33.05	Roy Perkins; United States	34.45
50 m freestyle S6	Yang Yuanrun; China	29.94	Xu Qing; China	30.17	Sebastian Iwanow; Germany	30.74
50 m freestyle S7	Matt Walker; Great Britain	28.26	Lantz Lamback; United States	28.63	David Roberts; Great Britain	28.90
50 m freestyle S8	Peter Leek; Australia	26.75	Konstantin Lisenkov; Russia	26.96	Maurice Deelen; Netherlands	26.97
50 m freestyle S9	Matthew Cowdrey; Australia	25.53	Guo Zhi; China	25.78	Tamás Tóth; Hungary	26.16
50 m freestyle S10	André Brasil; Brazil	23.53	Andrew Pasterfield; Australia	24.27	Phelipe Rodrigues; Brazil	24.78
50 m freestyle S11	Enhamed Enhamed; Spain	26.03	Yang Bozun; China	26.28	Konstantin Tychkov; Russia	27.91
50 m freestyle S12	Maksym Veraksa; Ukraine	23.47	Alexander Nevolin-Svetov; Russia	24.82	Tucker Dupree; United States	25.01
50 m freestyle S13	Dzmitry Salei; Belarus	24.29	Oleksii Fedyna; Ukraine	24.42	Charalampos Taiganidis; Greece	24.86
100 m freestyle S1	Itzhak Mamistvalov; Israel	2:21.83	Christos Tampaxis; Greece	2:53.30	João Martins; Portugal	3:30.44
100 m freestyle S2	Dmitry Kokarev; Russia	2:16.97	Jacek Czech; Poland	2:23.55	James Anderson; Great Britain	2:29.02
100 m freestyle S3	Dmytro Vynohradets; Ukraine	1:43.00	Li Hanhua; China	1:43.92	Andrey Meshcheryakov; Russia	1:49.70
100 m freestyle S4	David Smétanine; France	1:24.19	Richard Oribe; Spain	1:24.76	Gustavo Sánchez Martínez; Mexico	1:29.87
100 m freestyle S5	Daniel Dias; Brazil	1:10.24	Roy Perkins; United States	1:16.05	Hayri Simsek; France	1:18.98
100 m freestyle S6	Sebastian Iwanow; Germany	1:07.09	Anders Olsson; Sweden	1:10.15	Adriano Lima; Brazil	1:10.56
100 m freestyle S7	David Roberts; Great Britain	1:01.80	Matt Levy; Australia	1:01.89	Lantz Lamback; United States	1:02.10
100 m freestyle S8	Peter Leek; Australia	57.62	Konstantin Lisenkov; Russia	58.40	Maurice Deelen; Netherlands	59.27
100 m freestyle S9	Matthew Cowdrey; Australia	55.60	Guo Zhi; China	56.00	José Antonio Mari-Alcaraz; Spain	57.21
100 m freestyle S10	André Brasil; Brazil	50.87	Benoit Huot; Canada	53.46	Phelipe Rodrigues; Brazil	53.59
100 m freestyle S11	Enhamed Enhamed; Spain	58.59	Yang Bozun; China	59.03	Keiichi Kimura; Japan	1:02.12
100 m freestyle S12	Alexander Nevolin-Svetov; Russia	53.97	Tucker Dupree; United States	54.43	Sergei Punko; Russia	54.54
100 m freestyle S13	Dzmitry Salei; Belarus	53.15	Charl Bouwer; South Africa	53.38	Carlos Farremberg; Brazil	54.47
200 m freestyle S2	Dmitry Kokarev; Russia	4:42.04			Francesco Bettella; Italy	5:13.33
200 m freestyle S3	Dmytro Vynohradets; Ukraine	3:21.96	Li Hanhua; China	3:25.65	Andrey Meshcheryakov; Russia	3:42.39
200 m freestyle S4	David Smétanine; France	3:01.47	Richard Oribe; Spain	3:02.63	Gustavo Sánchez Martínez; Mexico	3:07.65
200 m freestyle S5	Daniel Dias; Brazil	2:26.51	Roy Perkins; United States	2:42.75	Sebastián Rodríguez Veloso; Spain	2:47.12
200 m freestyle S14	Daniel Pepper; Great Britain	2:02.18	Daniel Fox; Australia	2:03.61	Ben Procter; Great Britain	2:03.65
400 m freestyle S6	Anders Olsson; Sweden	5:04.28	Matthew Whorwood; Great Britain	5:10.09	Yevheniy Bohodayko; Ukraine	5:13.23
400 m freestyle S7	Mihovil Spanja; Croatia	4:47.39	David Roberts; Great Britain	4:48.11	Jonathan Fox; Great Britain	4:50.39
400 m freestyle S8	Thomas Young; Great Britain	4:36.45	Christoph Burkard; Germany	4:39.90	Wang Jia Chao; China	4:45.64
400 m freestyle S9	Brenden Hall; Australia	4:18.20	Jesús Collado Alarcón; Spain	4:20.86	James Crisp; Great Britain	4:21.52
400 m freestyle S10	André Brasil; Brazil		Benoit Huot; Canada	4:09.95	Robert Welbourn; Great Britain	4:13.18
400 m freestyle S11	Enhamed Enhamed; Spain	4:44.08	Philip Scholz; United States	4:49.40	Viktor Smyrnov; Ukraine	4:54.10
400 m freestyle S12	Sergei Punko; Russia	4:11.25			Tucker Dupree; United States	4:23.44
400 m freestyle S13	Ihar Boki; Belarus	4:06.91	Charl Bouwer; South Africa	4:11.77	Danylo Chufarov; Ukraine	4:17.39
50 m backstroke S2	Dmitry Kokarev; Russia	1:04.03	Jacek Czech; Poland	1:06.44	James Anderson; Great Britain	1:08.67
50 m backstroke S3	Li Hanhua; China	50.22	Miguel Ángel Martínez; Spain	51.20	Dmytro Vynohradets; Ukraine	52.32
50 m backstroke S4	Juan Ignacio Reyes; Mexico	46.09	Arnost Petracek; Czech Republic	46.93	David Smétanine; France	47.57
50 m backstroke S5	Daniel Dias; Brazil	35.67	Zsolt Vereczkei; Hungary	40.53	Zul Abdullah; Malaysia	42.51
100 m backstroke S6	Yevheniy Bohodayko; Ukraine	1:15.98	Yang Yuanrun; China	1:17.28	Igor Plotnikov; Russia	1:17.72
100 m backstroke S7	Jonathan Fox; Great Britain	1:11.94	Mihovil Spanja; Croatia	1:12.86	Lantz Lamback; United States	1:13.23
100 m backstroke S8	Konstantin Lisenkov; Russia	1:04.67	Peter Leek; Australia	1:05.56	Thomas Young; Great Britain	1:06.85
100 m backstroke S9	Matthew Cowdrey; Australia	1:01.85	James Crisp; Great Britain	1:03.52	Guo Zhi; China	1:03.58
100 m backstroke S10	André Brasil; Brazil	1:00.55	Benoit Huot; Canada; Kardo Ploomipuu; Estonia	1:01.29	—N/a	
100 m backstroke S11	Yang Bozun; China	1:09.11	Viktor Smyrnov; Ukraine	1:09.57	Dmytro Zalevskyy; Ukraine	1:10.94
100 m backstroke S12	Alexander Nevolin-Svetov; Russia	1:00.97	Maksym Veraksa; Ukraine	1:01.10	Tucker Dupree; United States	1:02.09
100 m backstroke S13	Ihar Boki; Belarus	59.90	Charalampos Taiganidis; Greece	1:01.37	Sean Russo; Australia	1:02.52
100 m backstroke S14	Tomoyuki Nagao; Japan	1:03.04	Lee Tsun Sang; Hong Kong	1:06.75	Marc Evers; Netherlands	1:06.77
50 m breaststroke SB2	Jose Castorena; Mexico	58.31	Somchai Doungkaew; Thailand	1:00.14	Michael Demarco; United States	1:00.68
50 m breaststroke SB3	Miguel Luque; Spain	49.26	Takayuki Suzuki; Japan	49.87	Vasilis Tsagkaris; Greece	50.71
100 m breaststroke SB4	Daniel Dias; Brazil	1:36.93	Ricardo Ten; Spain	1:37.53	Pablo Cimadevila; Spain	1:46.52
100 m breaststroke SB5	Anders Olsson; Sweden	1:39.64	Nils Grunenberg; Germany	1:40.39	Mateusz Michalski; Poland	1:43.88
100 m breaststroke SB6	Mihovil Spanja; Croatia	1:25.11	Yevheniy Bohodayko; Ukraine	1:25.30	Christoph Burkard; Germany	1:25.68
100 m breaststroke SB7	Blake Cochrane; Australia	1:24.44	Matt Levy; Australia	1:25.82	Rudy Garcia; United States	1:26.90
100 m breaststroke SB8	Andriy Kalyna; Ukraine	1:07.37	Maurice Deelen; Netherlands	1:15.07	Krzysztof Paterka; Poland	1:15.24
100 m breaststroke SB9	Pavel Poltavtsev; Russia	1:05.96	Kevin Paul; South Africa	1:07.29	Lin Furong; China	1:09.41
100 m breaststroke SB11	Viktor Smyrnov; Ukraine	1:15.19	Keiichi Kimura; Japan	1:17.96	Panom Lagsanaprim; Thailand	1:19.44
100 m breaststroke SB12	Maksym Veraksa; Ukraine	1:08.04	Uladzimir Izotau; Belarus	1:08.55		
100 m breaststroke SB13	Oleksii Fedyna; Ukraine	1:05.86	Maksym Zavodnyy; Ukraine	1:07.55	Mikhail Zimin; Russia	1:08.69
100 m breaststroke SB14	Daniel Pepper; Great Britain	1:11.08	Richard Eliason; Australia	1:11.48	Yasuhiro Tanaka; Japan	1:11.71
50 m butterfly S4	Arnost Petracek; Czech Republic	42.62	Somchai Doungkaew; Thailand	46.73	Juan Ignacio Reyes; Mexico	48.29
50 m butterfly S5	Daniel Dias; Brazil	34.33	Roy Perkins; United States	35.56	Voravit Keawkham; Thailand	42.04
50 m butterfly S6	Xu Qing; China	31.66	Sascha Kindred; Great Britain	32.26	Yevheniy Bohodayko; Ukraine	32.27
50 m butterfly S7	Tian Rong; China	31.47	Matt Walker; Great Britain	32.00	Matt Levy; Australia	32.26
100 m butterfly S8	Peter Leek; Australia	1:00.45	Wei Yanpeng; China	1:01.74	Charles Rozoy; France	1:01.97
100 m butterfly S9	Tamás Sors; Hungary	59.52	Matthew Cowdrey; Australia	1:00.35	Kristijan Vincetic; Croatia	1:00.65
100 m butterfly S10	André Brasil; Brazil	55.99	Mike van der Zanden; Netherlands	58.32	David Levecq; Spain	58.50
100 m butterfly S11	Enhamed Enhamed; Spain	1:03.30	Viktor Smyrnov; Ukraine	1:04.77	Keiichi Kimura; Japan	1:06.93
100 m butterfly S12	Roman Makarov; Russia	58.51	Sergei Punko; Russia	58.63	Tucker Dupree; United States	59.55
100 m butterfly S13	Ihar Boki; Belarus	57.28	Dzmitry Salei; Belarus	58.61	Danylo Chufarov; Ukraine	59.77
150 m individual medley SM3	Dmytro Vynohradets; Ukraine	3:11.00	Juan Ignacio Reyes; Mexico	3:16.76	Jose Castorena; Mexico	3:20.00
150 m individual medley SM4	Cameron Leslie; New Zealand	2:33.98	Jan Povysil; Czech Republic	2:40.68	Takayuki Suzuki; Japan	2:41.49
200 m individual medley SM5	Daniel Dias; Brazil	2:49.22	Pablo Cimadevila; Spain	3:10.01	Ivanildo Vasconcelos; Brazil	3:32.44
200 m individual medley SM6	Sascha Kindred; Great Britain	2:42.18	Yang Yuanrun; China	2:47.48	Iaroslav Semenenko; Ukraine	2:53.20
200 m individual medley SM7	Rudy Garcia; United States	2:36.78	Mihovil Spanja; Croatia	2:37.32	Matt Levy; Australia	2:42.28
200 m individual medley SM8	Peter Leek; Australia	2:21.84	Wang Jia Chao; China	2:28.01	Thomas Young; Great Britain	2:32.40
200 m individual medley SM9	Matthew Cowdrey; Australia	2:14.54	Andriy Kalyna; Ukraine	2:18.75	Guo Zhi; China	2:19.35
200 m individual medley SM10	Benoit Huot; Canada	2:11.30	André Brasil; Brazil	2:13.20	Sven Decaesstecker; Belgium	2:15.39
200 m individual medley SM11	Viktor Smyrnov; Ukraine	2:28.46	Donovan Tildesley; Canada	2:29.25	Keiichi Kimura; Japan	2:34.19
200 m individual medley SM12	Maksym Veraksa; Ukraine	2:11.11	Sergei Punko; Russia	2:14.74	Alexander Nevolin-Svetov; Russia	2:15.67
200 m individual medley SM13	Ihar Boki; Belarus	2:12.84	Dzmitry Salei; Belarus	2:15.03	Oleksii Fedyna; Ukraine	2:15.90
4×50 m freestyle 20pts	Jordi Gordillo (S5); Richard Oribe (S4); Sebastián Rodríguez Veloso (S5); Daniel Vidal Fuster (S6); Spain	2:21.82	Yevheniy Bohodayko (S6); Dmytro Kryzhanovskyy (S5); Iaroslav Semenenko (S6); Dmytro Vynohradets (S3); Ukraine	2:24.58	Frederic Bussi (S3); Charles Rozoy (S8); Hayri Simsek (S5); David Smetanine (S4); France	2:39.39
4×100 m freestyle 34pts	Matthew Cowdrey (S9); Peter Leek (S8); Matt Levy (S7); Andrew Pasterfield (S10); Australia	3:48.72	André Brasil (S10); Mauro Brasil (S9); Daniel Dias (S5); Phelipe Rodrigues; Brazil	3:53.79	David Roberts (S7); Graham Edmunds (S10); Matt Walker (S7); Robert Welbourn (S10); Great Britain	3:54.71
4×100 m freestyle 49pts	Roman Makarov (S9); Alexander Nevolin-Svetov (S12); Alexander Pikalov (S12); Stepan Smagin (S13); Russia	3:42.75	Enhamed Enhamed (S11); Enrique Floriano (S12); Omar Font (S12); Albert Gelis (S12); Spain	3:54.04	Arpiwat Aranghiran (S11); Tussakorn Nakprom (S13); Sutat Sawattarn (S13); Kitipong Sribunrueng (S12); Thailand	4:32.27
4×50 m medley 20pts	Daniel Dias (S5); Jeferson Da Silva Amaro (S6); Clodoaldo Silva (S4); Ivanildo Vasconcelos (S6); Brazil	2:37.32	Yevheniy Bohodayko (S6); Dmytro Kryzhanovskyy (S5); Iaroslav Semenenko (S6); Dmytro Vynohradets (S3); Ukraine	2:39.91	Jordi Gordillo (S5); Sebastián Rodríguez Veloso (S5); Ricardo Ten (S5); Daniel Vidal Fuster (S6); Spain	2:40.43
4×100 m medley 34pts	Matthew Cowdrey (S9); Peter Leek (S8); Matt Levy (S7); Andrew Pasterfield (S10); Australia	4:13.33	Konstantin Lisenkov (S8); Pavel Poltavtsev (SB9); Eduard Samarin (S10); Mikhail Sidnin (S8); Russia	4:15.46	Maksym Isayev (S10); Andriy Kalyna (S9); Oleksandr Komarov (S7); Andriy Sirovatchenko (S9); Ukraine	4:19.22
4×100 m medley 49pts	Roman Makarov (S9); Alexander Nevolin-Svetov (S12); Sergei Punko (S12); Mikhail Zimin (S13); Russia	4:02.14	Danylo Chufarov (S13); Oleksii Fedyna (S13); Viktor Smyrnov (S11); Maksym Veraksa (S12); Ukraine	4:05.51	Omar Font (S12); Albert Gelis (S12); Edgar Quirós Baltanas (S13); Spain	4:19.66
5 km Open water S1-10	Brenden Hall; Australia	1:01:13.14	Emanuel Goncalves; Portugal	1:01:16.85	Joe Wise; United States	1:02:34.58
5 km Open water S11-13	Sergei Punko; Russia	59:58.19	Enrique Floriano Millan; Spain	1:00:55.75	Robert Dorries; Germany	1:06:44.62

=== Women ===
Event	Gold		Silver		Bronze	
50 m freestyle S2	Ganna Ielisavetska; Ukraine	1:09.59	Darya Kopayeva; Ukraine; Iryna Sotska; Ukraine	1:12.37	—N/a	
50 m freestyle S3	Yip Pin Xiu; Singapore	1:03.17	Fran Williamson; Great Britain	1:04.60	Annke Conradi; Germany	1:05.51
50 m freestyle S4	Nely Miranda Herrera; Mexico	48.73	Jennie Ekstrom; Sweden	52.76	Edenia Garcia; Brazil	53:00
50 m freestyle S5	Nataliia Prologaieva; Ukraine	36.28	Běla Hlaváčková; Czech Republic	37.69	Anita Fatis; France	38.68
50 m freestyle S6	Ellie Simmonds; Great Britain	36.03	Mirjam de Koning; Netherlands	36.19	Natalie Jones; Great Britain	37.95
50 m freestyle S7	Mallory Weggemann; United States	31.64	Cortney Jordan; United States	33.63	Erin Popovich; United States	34.08
50 m freestyle S8	Jiang Shengnan; China	31.77	Jessica Long; United States	32.39	Olesya Vladykina; Russia	32.43
50 m freestyle S9	Louise Watkin; Great Britain	29.26	Natalie du Toit; South Africa	29.65	Irina Grazhdanova; Russia	29.76
50 m freestyle S10	Summer Mortimer; Canada	28.35	Sophie Pascoe; New Zealand	29.30	Elodie Lorandi; France	29.36
50 m freestyle S11	Xie Qing; China	31:46	Cecilia Camellini; Italy	31.85	Naomi Ikinaga; Japan	32.97
50 m freestyle S12	Oxana Savchenko; Russia	26.96	Anna Efimenko; Russia	28.02	Joanna Mendak; Poland	28.59
50 m freestyle S13	Kelley Becherer; United States	28:00	Iryna Balashova; Ukraine	28.18	Valérie Grand'Maison; Canada	28.35
100 m freestyle S2	Ganna Ielisavetska; Ukraine	2:24.17	Darya Kopayeva; Ukraine	2:33.71	Iryna Sotska; Ukraine	2:35.06
100 m freestyle S3	Patricia Valle; Mexico	2:06.53	Annke Conradi; Germany	2:19.60	Haidee Aceves Perez; Mexico	2:30.64
100 m freestyle S4	Nely Miranda Herrera; Mexico	1:41.74	Cheryl Angelelli; United States	1:49.77	Jennie Ekstrom; Sweden	1:53.92
100 m freestyle S5	Inbal Pezaro; Israel	1:23.41	Sarah Louise Rung; Norway	1:23.52	Anita Fatis; France	1:26.70
100 m freestyle S6	Ellie Simmonds; Great Britain	1:15.97	Mirjam de Koning; Netherlands	1:18.25	Song Lingling; China	1:21.63
100 m freestyle S7	Mallory Weggemann; United States	1:08.45	Erin Popovich; United States	1:12.03	Cortney Jordan; United States	1:12.28
100 m freestyle S8	Jessica Long; United States	1:06.95	Jacqueline Freney; Australia	1:09.08	Amalie Vinther; Denmark	1:13.05
100 m freestyle S9	Natalie du Toit; South Africa	1:02.79	Stephanie Millward; Great Britain	1:03.85	Louise Watkin; Great Britain	1:04.05
100 m freestyle S10	Summer Mortimer; Canada	1:01.39	Ashley Owens; United States	1:02.34	Elodie Lorandi; France	1:02.42
100 m freestyle S11	Cecilia Camellini; Italy	1:08.56	Xie Qing; China	1:09.24	Daniela Schulte; Germany	1:11.15
100 m freestyle S12	Oxana Savchenko; Russia	59.61	Anna Efimenko; Russia	1:02.35	Yuliya Volkova; Ukraine	1:03.69
100 m freestyle S13	Kelley Becherer; United States	59.53	Valérie Grand'Maison; Canada	1:00.24	Rhiannon Henry; Great Britain	1:01.13
200 m freestyle S2	Ganna Ielisavetska; Ukraine	5:06.28	Iryna Sotska; Ukraine	5:11.65	Darya Kopayeva; Ukraine	5:12.42
200 m freestyle S3	Patricia Valle; Mexico	4:24.30	Annke Conradi; Germany	4:51.49	Haidee Aceves Perez; Mexico	5:17.95
200 m freestyle S4	Nely Miranda Herrera; Mexico	3:43.75	Cheryl Angelelli; United States	3:49.92	Jennie Ekstrom; Sweden	4:00.30
200 m freestyle S5	Sarah Louise Rung; Norway	2:51.12	Inbal Pezaro; Israel	2:54.14	Zhou Ying; China	3:13.85
200 m freestyle S14	Marlou van der Kulk; Netherlands	2:16.35	Kara Leo; Australia	2:16.55	Natalie Massey; Great Britain	2:17.81
400 m freestyle S6	Ellie Simmonds; Great Britain	5:27.64	Song Lingling; China	5:51.43	Natalie Jones; Great Britain	5:55.94
400 m freestyle S7	Mallory Weggemann; United States	5:04.87	Erin Popovich; United States	5:22.48	Cortney Jordan; United States	5:25.93
400 m freestyle S8	Jessica Long; United States	4:48:58	Jacqueline Freney; Australia	5:11.39	Amalie Vinther; Denmark	5:31.98
400 m freestyle S9	Natalie du Toit; South Africa	4:30.64	Stephanie Millward; Great Britain	4:47.04	Ellie Cole; Australia	4:49.71
400 m freestyle S10	Ashley Owens; United States	4:39.53	Susan Beth Scott; United States	4:39.71	Katarzyna Pawlik; Poland	4:40.23
400 m freestyle S11	Daniela Schulte; Germany	5:10.77	Amber Thomas; Canada	5:32.79	Chantal Cavin; Switzerland	5:51.63
400 m freestyle S12	Anna Efimenko; Russia	4:48.72	Yuliya Volkova; Ukraine	4:51.19	Naomi Maike Schnittger; Germany	4:52.66
400 m freestyle S13	Valérie Grand'Maison; Canada	4:31.99	Rhiannon Henry; Great Britain	4:37.08	Kelley Becherer; United States	4:42.72
50 m backstroke S2	Ganna Ielisavetska; Ukraine	1:08.96	Darya Kopayeva; Ukraine	1:12.98	Iryna Sotska; Ukraine	1:18.48
50 m backstroke S3	Fran Williamson; Great Britain	1:05.38	Yip Pin Xiu; Singapore	1:07.02	Annke Conradi; Germany	1:07.16
50 m backstroke S4	Edenia Garcia; Brazil	52:87	Karolina Hamer; Poland	1:03.51	Jennie Ekstrom; Sweden	1:04.93
50 m backstroke S5	Nataliia Prologaieva; Ukraine	38.68 WR	Běla Hlaváčková; Czech Republic	43.03	Karina Lauridsen; Denmark	45.36
100 m backstroke S7	Kirsten Bruhn; Germany	1:23.19	Mallory Weggemann; United States	1:23.39	Rebecca Dubber; New Zealand	1:25.39
100 m backstroke S8	Jessica Long; United States	1:17.56	Lu Weiyuan; China	1:22.24	Jin Xiaoqin; China	1:22.31
100 m backstroke S9	Natalie du Toit; South Africa	1:09.83	Stephanie Millward; Great Britain	1:10.31	Stephanie Dixon; Canada	1:11.05
100 m backstroke S10	Summer Mortimer; Canada	1:06.74	Sophie Pascoe; New Zealand	1:07.85	Susan Beth Scott; United States	1:13.45
100 m backstroke S11	Cecilia Camellini; Italy	1:19.78	Rina Akiyama; Japan	1:20.26	Daniela Schulte; Germany	1:20.64
100 m backstroke S12	Oxana Savchenko; Russia	1:10.06	Anna Efimenko; Russia	1:11.15	Karina Petrikovicova; Slovakia	1:14.38
100 m backstroke S13	Kelley Becherer; United States	1:09.25	Chelsey Gotell; Canada	1:10.81	Akari Kasamoto; Japan	1:13.33
100 m backstroke S14	Marlou van der Kulk; Netherlands	1:10.90	Kayla Clarke; Australia	1:11.13	Leung Shu Hang; Hong Kong	1:11.79
50 m breaststroke SB2	Xia Jiangbo; China	1:12.62 WR	Jennie Ekstrom; Sweden	1:18.86		
50 m breaststroke SB3	Karina Lauridsen; Denmark	1:02.54	Patricia Valle; Mexico	1:06.46	Marayke Jonkers; Australia	1:09.62
100 m breaststroke SB4	Sarah Louise Rung; Norway	1:52.64	Inbal Pezaro; Israel	1:57.84	Běla Hlaváčková; Czech Republic	2:00.79
100 m breaststroke SB5	Kirsten Bruhn; Germany	1:35.26	Verena Schott; Germany	1:51.39	Rachel Lardiere; France	1:53.55
100 m breaststroke SB6	Mallory Weggemann; United States	1:35.51	Charlotte Henshaw; Great Britain	1:39.74	Elizabeth Johnson; Great Britain	1:39.88
100 m breaststroke SB7	Erin Popovich; United States	1:32.47	Jessica Long; United States	1:33.06	Lisa den Braber; Netherlands	1:36.55
100 m breaststroke SB8	Olesya Vladykina; Russia	1:20.98	Claire Cashmore; Great Britain	1:22.02	Natalie du Toit; South Africa	1:25.95
100 m breaststroke SB9	Harriet Lee; Great Britain	1:19.86	Louise Watkin; Great Britain	1:20.96	Sophie Pascoe; New Zealand	1:21.25
100 m breaststroke SB11	Maja Reichard; Sweden	1:34.34	Nadia Baez; Argentina	1:34.59	Daniela Schulte; Germany	1:35.35
100 m breaststroke SB12	Karolina Pelendritou; Cyprus	1:18.36	Yaryna Malto; Ukraine	1:20.07	Yuliya Volkova; Ukraine	1:23.34
100 m breaststroke SB13	Chelsey Gotell; Canada	1:23.10	Valérie Grand'Maison; Canada	1:23.27	Iryna Balashova; Ukraine	1:29.20
100 m breaststroke SB14	Leung Shu Hang; Hong Kong	1:21.80	Magda Toeters; Netherlands	1:23.02	Tamara Medarts; Belgium	1:23.96
50 m butterfly S3	Patricia Valle; Mexico	1:05.24	Alexandra Agafonova; Russia	1:07.82	Haidee Aceves Perez; Mexico	1:12.76
50 m butterfly S5	Sarah Louise Rung; Norway	43.22	Natallia Shavel; Belarus	46.39	Joana Maria Silva; Brazil	48.45
50 m butterfly S6	Oksana Khrul; Ukraine	38.46	Anastasia Diodorova; Russia	39.09	Inbal Schwartz; Israel	41.05
50 m butterfly S7	Mallory Weggemann; United States	34.85	Erin Popovich; United States	36.51	Veronica Almeida; Brazil	39.34
100 m butterfly S8	Jessica Long; United States	1:11.78	Jin Xiaoqin; China	1:13.71	Chen Zhonglan; China	1:14.11
100 m butterfly S9	Natalie du Toit; South Africa	1:08.30	Sarai Gascon; Spain	1:10.96	Stephanie Millward; Great Britain	1:11.07
100 m butterfly S10	Sophie Pascoe; New Zealand	1:08.06	Elodie Lorandi; France	1:09.09	Anna Eames; United States	1:10.52
100 m butterfly S11	Daniela Schulte; Germany	1:26.24	Amber Thomas; Canada	1:30.90	Stephanie Douard; France	1:37.03
100 m butterfly S12	Joanna Mendak; Poland	1:07.53	Yuliya Volkova; Ukraine	1:12.99	Carla Casals; Spain	1:15.20
100 m butterfly S13	Rhiannon Henry; Great Britain	1:06.61	Valérie Grand'Maison; Canada	1:07.65	Kelley Becherer; United States	1:09.06
150 m individual medley SM3	Jennie Ekstrom; Sweden	3:34.64	Patricia Valle; Mexico	3:37.75		
150 m individual medley SM4	Karina Lauridsen; Denmark	2:51.12	Karolina Hamer; Poland	3:32.31	Rildene Firmino; Brazil	3:54.02
200 m individual medley SM5	Nataliia Prologaieva; Ukraine	3:34:43	Natallia Shavel; Belarus	3:51.31	Lorena Homer Lopez; Spain	4:13.71
200 m individual medley SM6	Ellie Simmonds; Great Britain	3:09.24	Verena Schott; Germany	3:10.96	Natalie Jones; Great Britain	3:11.12
200 m individual medley SM7	Mallory Weggemann; United States	2:48.43	Erin Popovich; United States	2:57.14	Cortney Jordan; United States	3:08.06
200 m individual medley SM8	Jessica Long; United States	2:38.31	Olesya Vladykina; Russia	2:48.71	Amanda Everlove; United States	2:52.85
200 m individual medley SM9	Natalie du Toit; South Africa	2:32.11	Louise Watkin; Great Britain	2:37.71	Ellie Cole; Australia	2:42.13
200 m individual medley SM10	Summer Mortimer; Canada	2:30.14	Sophie Pascoe; New Zealand	2:30.64	Elodie Lorandi; France	2:35.85
200 m individual medley SM11	Daniela Schulte; Germany	2:52.36	Cecilia Camellini; Italy	2:58.17	Xie Qing; China	2:59.27
200 m individual medley SM12	Oxana Savchenko; Russia	2:33.10	Joanna Mendak; Poland	2:37.81	Yuliya Volkova; Ukraine	2:41.18
200 m individual medley SM13	Kelley Becherer; United States	2:30.32	Valérie Grand'Maison; Canada	2:31.08	Chelsey Gotell; Canada	2:34.53
4×50 m freestyle 20pts	Olena Fedota; Ganna Ielisavetska; Nataliia Prologaieva; Nataliia Semenova; Ukraine	2:59.15	Ana Carneiro Grilla Cruz; Edenia Garcia; Leticia Lucas Ferreira; Joana Maria Silva; Brazil	3:11.05	Nadia Porras Izquierdo; Vianney Trejo Delgadillo; Patricia Valle; Nely Miranda Herrera; Mexico	3:30.15
4×100 m freestyle 34pts	Jessica Long; Ashley Owens; Elizabeth Scott; Mallory Weggemann; United States	4:23.59	Claire Cashmore; Ellie Simmonds; Stephanie Millward; Louise Watkin; Great Britain	4:29.49	Chen Zhonglan; He Zhenxing; Jin Xiaoqin; Lin Ping; China	4:46.90
4×50 m medley 20pts	Jiang Fuying; Lu Dong; Song Lingling; Xia Jiangbo; China	3:11.37	Olena Fedota; Ganna Ielisavetska; Oksana Khrul; Darya Kopayeva; Nataliia Prologaieva; Ukraine	3:14.85	Natalie Jones; Nyree Kindred; Ellie Simmonds; Fran Williamson; Great Britain	3:17.98
4×100 m medley 34pts	Anna Eames; Cortney Jordan; Jessica Long; Ashley Owens; Erin Popovich; Susan Beth Scott; Mallory Weggemann; United States	5:00.68	Claire Cashmore; Harriet Lee; Stephanie Millward; Ellie Simmonds; Great Britain	5:00.93	Irina Grazhdanova; Oxana Guseva; Nina Ryabova; Olesya Vladykina; Russia	5:02.26
5 km Open water S1-10	Natalie du Toit; South Africa	1:00:22.00	Elodie Lorandi; France	1:06:48.05	Sanja Milojevic; Croatia	1:07:33.35
5 km Open water S11-13 (Note: As van Roosmalen was the only competitor to take part in this event no medals would be awarded.)	Teigan van Roosmalen; Australia	1:17:35.51	—N/a		—N/a	

== Participating nations ==
Below is the list of countries which participated in the Championships.

- Australia
- Belarus
- Belgium
- Brazil
- Canada
- China
- Chinese Taipei
- Colombia
- Croatia
- Cyprus
- Czech Republic
- Estonia
- Finland
- France
- Germany
- Great Britain
- Greece
- Hong Kong
- Hungary
- Iceland
- Iran
- Israel
- Italy
- Japan
- Malaysia
- Mexico
- Netherlands
- New Zealand
- Norway
- Poland
- Portugal
- Russia
- Serbia
- Singapore
- Slovakia
- Slovenia
- South Africa
- Spain
- Sri Lanka
- Sweden
- Switzerland
- Thailand
- Turkey
- Ukraine
- United States
- Venezuela
- Vietnam

== Footnotes ==
Notes
