= Peter Leek =

Australian Paralympic swimmer

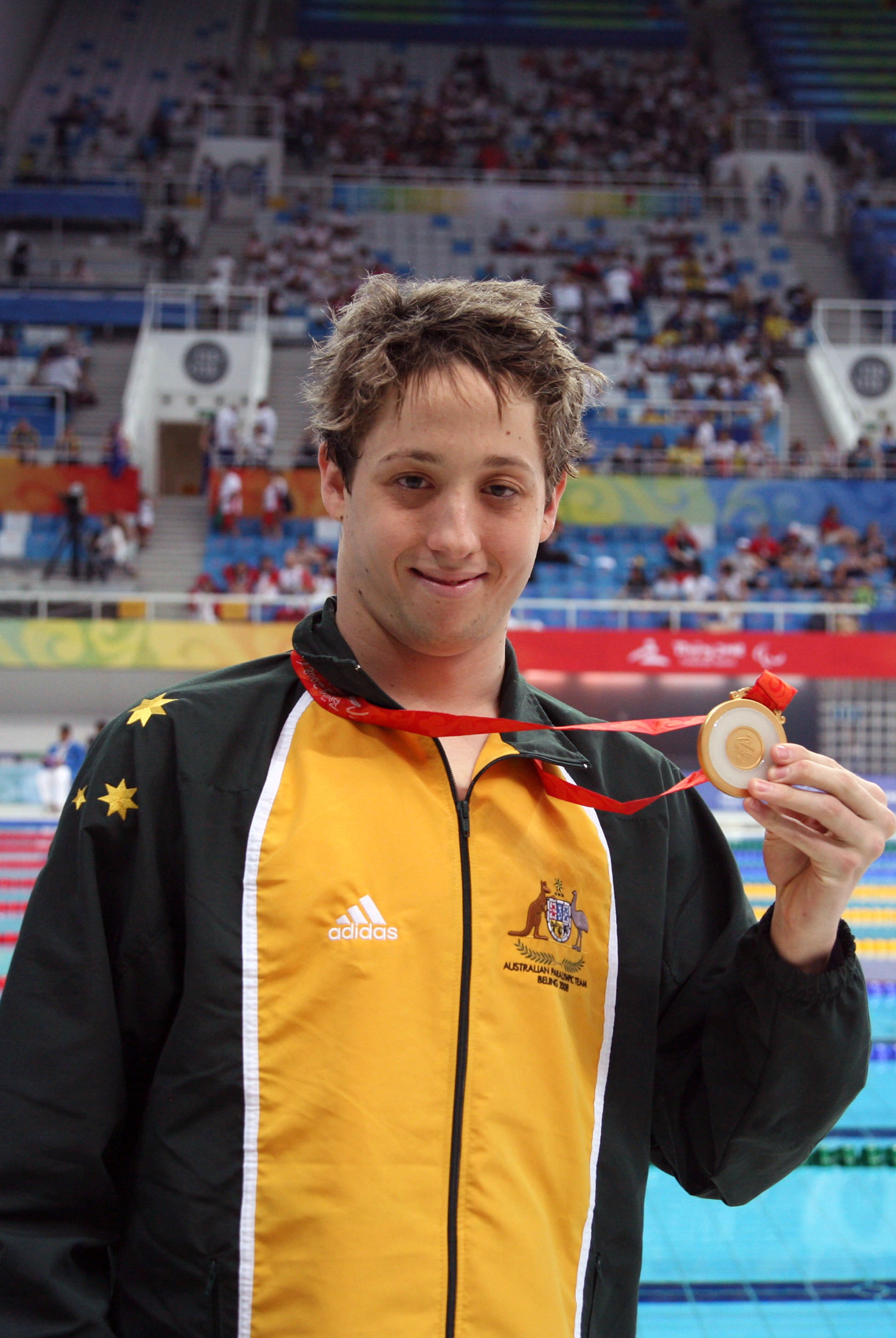
- Peter Leek multiple gold medallist at the 2008 Beijing Games

Personal information
- Full name: Peter Alan Stuart Leek
- Nationality: Australia
- Born: 27 September 1988 (age 37) Blacktown, New South Wales, Australia

Sport
- Sport: Swimming
- Strokes: Freestyle, butterfly, medley
- Classifications: S8, SB7, SM8
- Club: Cranbrook Eastern Edge
Medal record
Men's paralympic swimming
Representing Australia
Paralympic Games
Gold medal – first place	2008 Beijing	100 m butterfly S8
Gold medal – first place	2008 Beijing	200 m medley SM8
Gold medal – first place	2008 Beijing	4×100 m medley
Silver medal – second place	2008 Beijing	50 m freestyle S8
Silver medal – second place	2008 Beijing	400 m freestyle S8
Silver medal – second place	2008 Beijing	100 m backstroke S8
Silver medal – second place	2008 Beijing	4×100 m freestyle
Bronze medal – third place	2008 Beijing	100 m freestyle S8
World Championships (LC)
Gold medal – first place	2006 Durban	100 m backstroke S8
Gold medal – first place	2006 Durban	4×100 m medley
Gold medal – first place	2010 Eindhoven	50 m freestyle S8
Gold medal – first place	2010 Eindhoven	100 m freestyle S8
Gold medal – first place	2010 Eindhoven	100 m butterfly S8
Gold medal – first place	2010 Eindhoven	200 m medley SM8
Gold medal – first place	2010 Eindhoven	4×100 m freestyle
Gold medal – first place	2010 Eindhoven	4×100 m medley
Silver medal – second place	2006 Durban	100 m butterfly S8
Silver medal – second place	2006 Durban	200 m medley SM8
Silver medal – second place	2010 Eindhoven	100 m backstroke S8
Bronze medal – third place	2006 Durban	400 m freestyle S8

Peter Alan Stuart Leek, OAM (born 27 September 1988) is an Australian former swimmer with ataxic cerebral palsy, who won eight medals at the 2008 Beijing Paralympics.

== Early life ==
Leek was born in the Sydney suburb of Blacktown. He began swimming at the age of eight to aid his disability. He was a member of Ripples St Marys Swimming Club for 13 years. He attended Oxley Park Public School during his primary school years, and then Colyton High School. He completed a Bachelor of Applied Economics at the University of Canberra.

== Career ==
His debut in major international competition was at the 2006 IPC Swimming World Championships in Durban, South Africa where he won two gold, two silver and one bronze medals.

At the 2008 Beijing Games in his Paralympic debut, he won three gold medals in the Men's 100 m Butterfly S8, Men's 200 m Individual Medley SM8, and Men's 4 × 100 m Medley 34 pts events, for which he received a Medal of the Order of Australia, four silver medals in the Men's 50 m Freestyle S8, Men's 4 × 100 m Freestyle 34 pts, Men's 400 m Freestyle S8, and Men's 100 m Backstroke S8 events, and a bronze medal in the Men's 100 m Freestyle S8 event. He broke four world records and four Paralympic records.

He competed in the 2010 IPC Swimming World Championships, held in Eindhoven, Netherlands where he won six gold medals and one silver medal. Leek's medals helped Australia's national Paralympic swim team finish sixth overall.

He missed the 2010 Commonwealth Games due to glandular fever. Leek did not return to the pool following this illness. Leek turned to a different passion and graduated from the University of Canberra with a Bachelor of Applied Economics. Following his graduation, Peter began working as a management consultant in health, ageing and human services at KPMG Australia. Leek considers his graduation as one of his greatest achievements.

He was an Australian Institute of Sport scholarship recipient.

Leek is also a committee member for the Friends of Brain Injured Children ACT organisation in Australia.

== Recognition ==
- 2008 and 2009: Hawkesbury Sportsperson of the Year. Leek was the first athlete to receive the award in two consecutive years.
- 2008: Junior Athlete of the Year award from the Australian Paralympic Committee.
- 2009: Medal of the Order of Australia.
- 2009: New South Wales Disabled Athlete of the Year.
- Hawkesbury Sportsperson of the Year award in 2008 and 2009, the first athlete to have received the award in two consecutive years.
- 2009: Young Sports Achievement Award Penrith City Council.
- 2010: Swimming Australia's Multi-Class Swimmer of the Year.
- 2025: University of Canberra Sport Walk of Fame induction

== Bibliography ==
- Wake, Rebekka (September 2010). "Golden Glow Over Australian Swimming". Australian Paralympian. 2. Australia: Australian Paralympic Committee.
