= Emma Cattle =

British Paralympian swimmer

Personal information
- National team: Great Britain
- Born: 10 April 1988 (age 38) Luton, England

Sport
- Sport: Swimming
- Strokes: Backstroke; Freestyle; Medley
- Classifications: S10, SM10
- Club: Luton
Medal record
Representing Great Britain
World Para Swimming European Championships
Bronze medal – third place	2009 Reykjavík	400 m freestyle S10
Bronze medal – third place	2011 Berlin	100 m backstroke S10

Emma Cattle (born 10 April 1988 in Luton) is a British Paralympian competing in S10 events. She competed at the 2008 Summer Paralympics, and won medals at the 2009 and 2011 IPC Swimming European Championships.

== Personal life ==
Cattle has cerebral palsy. She attended Barnfield College.

== Career ==
Cattle trains at Luton swimming club, and competes in S10 and SM10 events. She began swimming aged 8 at her local swimming club in Luton. She was selected to compete at the 2008 Paralympics, coming sixth in the final of the 100 metre backstroke S10 competition. She also competed in the 50 metre freestyle S10, where she finished last in her heat, and the Women's 200 m individual medley SM10, where she was disqualified in her heat. Cattle qualified to compete at the 2009 IPC Swimming European Championships, her third appearance at the event. She won a bronze medal in the 400 metre freestyle S10. In 2009, Cattle broke the British 100m backstroke S10 record with a time of 1:12.55; her record was later broken in 2013. At the 2011 IPC Swimming European Championships, Cattle won a silver medal in the 100 metres backstroke S10 event; her time in the event was a national record. She also set a national record in the 50 metres freestyle event, and set personal bests in the 100 metres freestyle and 200m individual medley events.

Cattle failed to qualify for the 2012 Summer Paralympics after finishing eighth in the 400m mixed category freestyle final at the British Championships. In 2015, Cattle won the mixed category 100m freestyle C final of a 2015 British Para-Swimming International Meet event in Glasgow. She also competed in the 50m and 100m freestyle and 100m backstroke events in the East Region Winter Championships.
