= INAS World Swimming Championships =

Quadrennial international swimming competition

INAS World Swimming Championships are a quadrennial international swimming competition organised by International Sports Federation for Persons with Intellectual Disability for athletes who have an intellectual impairment and swim in the S14 swimming category in Paralympic swimming.

== Swimming events contested ==
All swimming events were contested in long course (50 metre) swimming pools.

Event	1989	2004	2005	2007	2009	2013	2017
50m freestyle	X	X	X	X	X	X	X
100m freestyle	X	X	X	X	X	X	X
200m freestyle	X	X	X	X	X	X	X
400m freestyle		X	X	X	X	X	X
800m freestyle		X	X	X	X	X	X
1500m freestyle		X	X	X	X	X	X
50m backstroke	X	X	X	X	X	X	X
100m backstroke	X	X	X	X	X	X	X
200m backstroke	X	X	X	X	X	X	X
50m breaststroke	X	X	X	X	X	X	X
100m breaststroke	X	X	X	X	X	X	X
200m breaststroke	X	X	X	X	X	X	X
50m butterfly	X	X	X	X	X	X	X
100m butterfly	X	X	X	X	X	X	X
200m butterfly		X	X	X	X	X	X
200m individual medley	X	X	X	X	X	X	X
400m individual medley		X	X	X	X	X	X
4x50m freestyle relay	X	X	X	X	X	X	X
4x100m freestyle relay	X	X	X	X	X	X	X
4x200m freestyle relay				X			
4x50m medley relay	X	X	X	X	X	X	X
4x100m medley relay	X	X	X	X	X	X	X

== Hosts ==
Year	Host	Dates	Nations	Events	Ref
1989	(Sweden) Härnösand	2–6 July			
1999	(Czech Republic) Liberec				
2004	Hong Kong	7–14 January			
2005	(Czech Republic) Liberec	4–11 September			
2007	(Belgium) Ghent	21–28 August			
2013	(New Caledonia) Noumea	19–23 August			
2017	(Mexico) Aguascalientes City	29 November – 3 December			
2021	(France) Montluçon	10–18 December			
2025	(Thailand) Bangkok	20–30 August			

== Medal table ==
Rank	Nation	Gold	Silver	Bronze	Total
1	Australia	50	41	36	127
2	Hong Kong	41	30	24	95
3	Great Britain	21	33	27	81
4	Brazil	20	7	5	32
5	Hungary	17	8	10	35
6	Sweden	15	12	14	41
7	Iceland	15	10	7	32
8	Japan	14	23	20	57
9	Mexico	10	12	13	35
10	South Africa	9	21	26	56
11	France	9	8	5	22
12	Spain	8	9	3	20
13	Netherlands	7	3	3	13
14	Poland	3	6	10	19
15	Chinese Taipei	2	4	2	8
16	Estonia	2	3	4	9
17	South Korea	2	2	4	8
18	United States	1	5	7	13
19	Colombia	1	4	4	9
20	Macau	1	1	1	3
21	Czech Republic	0	4	6	10
22	Belgium	0	0	3	3
23	Denmark	0	0	1	1
23	Russia	0	0	1	1
Totals (24 entries)		248	246	236	730

== See also ==
- World Para Swimming Championships
