= Chloe Davies =

British Paralympic swimmer

Personal information
- Full name: Chloe Davies
- Nationality: British
- Born: 15 December 1998 (age 27) Midsomer Norton, England

Sport
- Sport: Swimming
- Strokes: freestyle, backstroke, medley
- Club: Trowbridge ASC
Medal record
Representing Great Britain
Women's swimming
IPC World Championships
Bronze medal – third place	2013 Montreal	200m medley SM14
IPC European Championships
Bronze medal – third place	2014 Eindhoven	200m freestyle S14

Chloe Davies (born 15 December 1998) is a British Paralympic swimmer. Davies competes in S14 events mainly freestyle, backstroke and medley preferring shorter distances. She qualified for the 2012 Summer Paralympics becoming Great Britain's youngest competitor at the Games.

== Career history ==
Davies was born in Midsomer Norton, England in 1998. Davies, who has difficulties with her short-term memory and also suffers from an auditory processing disorder, began swimming when her mother took her to the local pool as a baby. She joined a local club and began competing from the age of seven.

Davies joined Trowbridge ASC and began competing at national level. In 2011, at the age of 12, she entered the National Short Course Championships in Sheffield, where she set a British record in the S14 category for the 100m backstroke. The following year she competed in the 2012 British Championships in London. There she competed in both the 200m freestyle and 100m backstroke for her classification. She finished fifth in the backstroke and second in the freestyle, qualifying for the 2012 Summer Paralympics in both events.

At the 2012 Paralympics Davies finished first in heat three of the 100m backstroke, posting a personal best of 1:09.22, the fastest qualifying time of the heats. Despite her strong performance in the heats, in the final she was unable to reproduce her qualifying time, recording 1:10.10 to finish fifth behind Great Britain team-mate Jessica-Jane Applegate. Davies also competed in the 200m freestyle and although finishing third in her heat, she was just under a second too slow to qualify for the final as one of the eight fastest swimmers.

In 2013, Davies was again selected for the British team, this time for the 2013 IPC Swimming World Championships in Montreal. There she competed in three events, the 200m freestyle, 100m backstroke and 200m individual medley. She posted 6th in the freestyle and 4th in the backstroke, but took bronze in the medley, her first medal of a major international event.
