= Rafael Polinario =

Cuban and Canadian swimmer and coach

Rafael Fidel Polinario
- Polinario in 1981

Personal information
- Born: 13 August 1959 Varadero, Cuba
- Died: 10 March 2017 (aged 57) Toronto, Ontario, Canada
- Resting place: Mount Pleasant Cemetery, Toronto
Medal record
Representing Cuba
Swimming
Central American and Caribbean Games
Bronze medal – third place	1982 Havana	4x100 m freestyle relay
Bronze medal – third place	1982 Havana	4x200 m freestyle relay

Rafael Fidel Polinario (13 August 1959 – 10 March 2017) was a Cuban and Canadian swimmer and coach. Cuba's most decorated swimmer during his time competing for them, Polinario sought asylum in Canada due to persecution for being gay. He went on to coach Canadian swimmers to the Paralympic Games. In his own swimming career, he was often listed as Fidel Polinario or RF Polinario; as a coach he was typically listed as Rafael or Raphael Polinario.

== Swimming career ==
Polinario had a competitive swimming career in his youth. When he was five years old, and having not been actively seeking swimming classes or clubs, his mother was asked to let him compete in a local team. From this, he was recruited to the Cuban junior national team when he was eleven, having to move to Havana; his mother was not enthusiastic about this, as he was so young, while Polinario said because he was so young he did not realise the gravity and enjoyed it. Originally a distance swimmer, Polinario trained to swim shorter distances and was taken into the senior national team when he was fourteen, spending his career in it predominantly swimming 100 m and 200 m freestyle. In 1980 he still held the national record of 17:29.5 for 1500 m and by 1981, aged 22, he was the national team captain and most decorated swimmer.

He swam the last leg of the 4x100 relay for the Cuban team at the 1978 Central American and Caribbean Games, giving them a time of 4:22.10. At the 1980 Copa Cuba, Polinario's 4x200 relay team set a new national record of 8:24.8. Polinario was one of five Cuban swimmers to meet qualifying standards for the 1980 Summer Olympics but, with further doubt due to the boycott, they did not know if they would compete. Though his obituary says he went to the Games, and placed 11th in the 100 free, Olympic and World Aquatics records show Cuba did not ultimately enter a swimming team. Shortly after the 1980 Games, the Cuban Swimming Federation announced that they thought the ages of their swimmers – many over 20 – was negatively affecting their performance when competing abroad, and the Federation would begin an investigation into this. In a Cuban swimming competition with Mexican invitees in early 1981, Polinario's old 1500 m record was overtaken, while he himself won the 100, 200 and 400 m free races all with improved times.

One of his greatest competition performances was during the Copa Cuba in 1981, a swim meet organised by Cuban authorities to gauge the abilities of their national swimmers, with Canadian invitees to challenge them. In all three individual events (100, 200, 400) he contested, Polinario won the gold and set a new national record. In the 4x200 relay – in which the Cuban team ultimately took over 10 seconds off their previous record set less than a year earlier – Polinario started his leg almost two body lengths behind the Canadians, closing the gap and overtaking at the wall to take the gold; Revista Bohemia wrote that the "sensational duel" was so exciting, the audience gathered by the pool edge in the rain to see who would win. It also noted Polinario's particular strength for good, quick turns at the wall and in finishing, but was concerned that, if Polinario was hitting his peak, the lack of sufficient infrastructure would prevent Cuba from being able to nurture and promote swimming talent to compete with the rest of the world. He may have been referring to this event when discussing his own personal career highlights in the 2000s.

At the 1982 Central American and Caribbean Games, held in Havana, Polinario came fifth in both the 100 and 200 free. He again swam the anchor leg for Cuba in the relays, and with times of 3:35.67 in the 4x100 and 7:51.91 in the 4x200, they won two bronze medals. He swam the freestyle in the 4x100 medley, with this team coming fourth.

== Coaching career and defection ==
While swimming with the national team, Polinario studied for a degree in physical education and coached the youth team. Upon retirement, when he was 22, he stayed in university to pursue a master's degree and began coaching the national team briefly until the head coach told him that the federation had discovered he associated with "anti-social, anti-communist groups, and homosexuals"; though they did not out him, they told him to quit his position and not pursue coaching in Cuba. Polinario transferred to Hungary to finish his degree, intending to claim asylum in Spain afterward. Polinario planned his defection for his return flight, originally from Budapest to Havana with a scheduled stop in Madrid; however, a brother of Fidel Castro was also on the plane and it was changed to a direct flight, only stopping to refuel at Gander International Airport in Newfoundland, Canada. Polinario disembarked at Gander and asked for asylum at the gate, assuming he would more easily be able to move to Spain. Instead, when his asylum paperwork was complete, he moved to St. John's and enrolled in an ESL school. He was granted asylum when he was 25, in 1985.

In Newfoundland, Polinario initially worked as a lifeguard and then became a swim instructor. At 26, he represented the province in a Canadian national competition. Polinario then moved to Toronto, joining gay swim clubs and competing at gay meets, including an IGLA+ event in Atlanta, as well as the gay waterpolo team Toronto Triggerfish. He continued playing social waterpolo for many years.

He continued coaching swimming in Toronto, particularly at Variety Village Aquatic Club. The club focused on para-swimming; he coached athletes including Elisabeth Walker-Young and his daughter Anne Polinario at four Summer Paralympic Games between 1992 and 2008. He then retired from elite coaching, remaining with Variety Village as team director and still coaching junior swim teams there until at least 2013. Nydia Langill, who Polinario coached as a junior, later went on to compete at the Paralympics in 2016. Polinario described Walker-Young as the most inspirational person in his life, for how she dealt with pressure competing at the Paralympics aged 14; Walker-Young reflected following his death that Polinario is the coach whose motivational style made her able to manage this.

== Personal life ==
Rafael Fidel Polinario was born on 13 August 1959 to Rafael Polinario and Josefa Pereira, one of five siblings. He was from Varadero, Cuba. Although he knew he was gay from childhood, he married a woman, Annie, a member of the Cuban synchronised swimming team and with whom he was close, when he was 20; they separated when their daughter Anne was one year old. Born with foot paralysis, Anne Polinario moved to Canada as a teenager to live with her father for better quality of life.

After an extended illness, Polinario died of cancer on 10 March 2017 at the Sunnybrook Health Sciences Centre. His funeral was held at Mount Pleasant Cemetery.
