= Ana Rubio Zavala =

Spanish Paralympic swimmer (born 1993)

Personal information
- Full name: Ana Maria Rubio Zavala
- Nickname: Anita
- Born: 21 February 1993 (age 33) Irun, Spain
- Height: 1.63 m (5 ft 4 in)
- Weight: 54 kg (119 lb)

Sport
- Country: Spain
- Sport: Paralympic swimming
- Disability: Dysmelia
- Disability class: S10, SB9, SM10
- Club: Bidadoa 21
- Coached by: Javier De Aymerich; Javier Garcia

Ana Maria Rubio Zavala (born 21 February 1993) is a Spanish Paralympic swimmer who competed in international level events. She was born with no fingers on her left hand.
