= Kara Leo =

Australian Paralympic swimmer

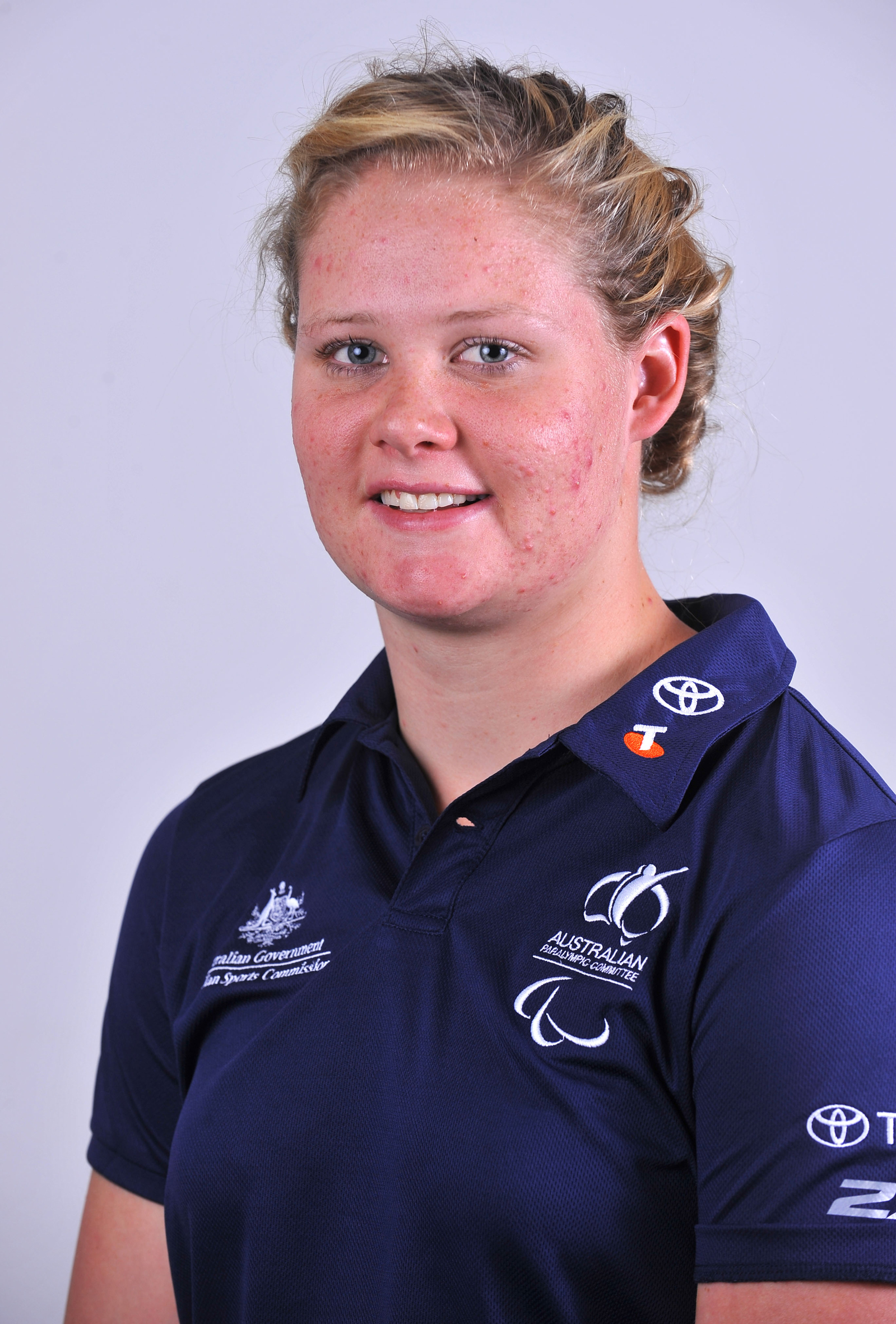
- 2012 Australian Paralympic team portrait of Leo

Personal information
- Full name: Kara Leo
- Nationality: Australia
- Born: 21 September 1992 (age 34)

Sport
- Sport: Swimming
- Strokes: Freestyle, backstroke
- Classifications: S14, SB14, SM14
- Club: Nepean Aquatic
Medal record
Women's paralympic swimming
Representing Australia
World Championships (LC)
Silver medal – second place	2010 Eindhoven	200 m freestyle S14

Kara Leo (born 21 September 1992) is an Australian swimmer. She has been selected to represent Australia at the 2012 Summer Paralympics in the S14 200m freestyle and 100m backstroke swimming events.

== Personal ==
Leo was born on 21 September 1992 in, New South Wales. In 2007, Leo won the NSW Junior Athlete of the Year with a Disability award. In 2010, she earned the NSW Sports Federation's Young Athlete with a Disability award.

Leo attended Caroline Chisholm College. She is involved with the Samuel Morris Foundation, an organisation that helps children cope with near-drowning experiences, whom she represents as a youth ambassador.

== Swimming ==
Leo is an S14 classification swimmer. She is a member of the Nepean Aquatic Swim Club.

Leo started swimming in 1996. She first represented Australia in 2007, where she finished first at the 2007 INAS-FID Swimming World Championships in the 50m backstroke event. All told at the event, she won one bronze medal, four silver medals and five gold medals. She competed at the 2009 Global Games. In 2009, she competed at the All Schools Australian Swimming Championships. In the years 16-19 multi-disability 100-metre freestyle event, she finished in first with a personal best time of 1.06.73, finished third in the 50-metres butterfly event and the 4x50-metres free relay event, and finished fourth in the 200-metres individual medley.

Leo competed at the 2010 Global Games, where she earned nine gold medals, one silver medal and two bronze medals. One of her first-place finishes was in an 800-metre event. She competed at the 2010 International Paralympic Committee Swimming World Championships in the S14 200m freestyle event where she finished second and set a personal best. Her 2010 training included seven to "eight water sessions and three gym sessions a week."

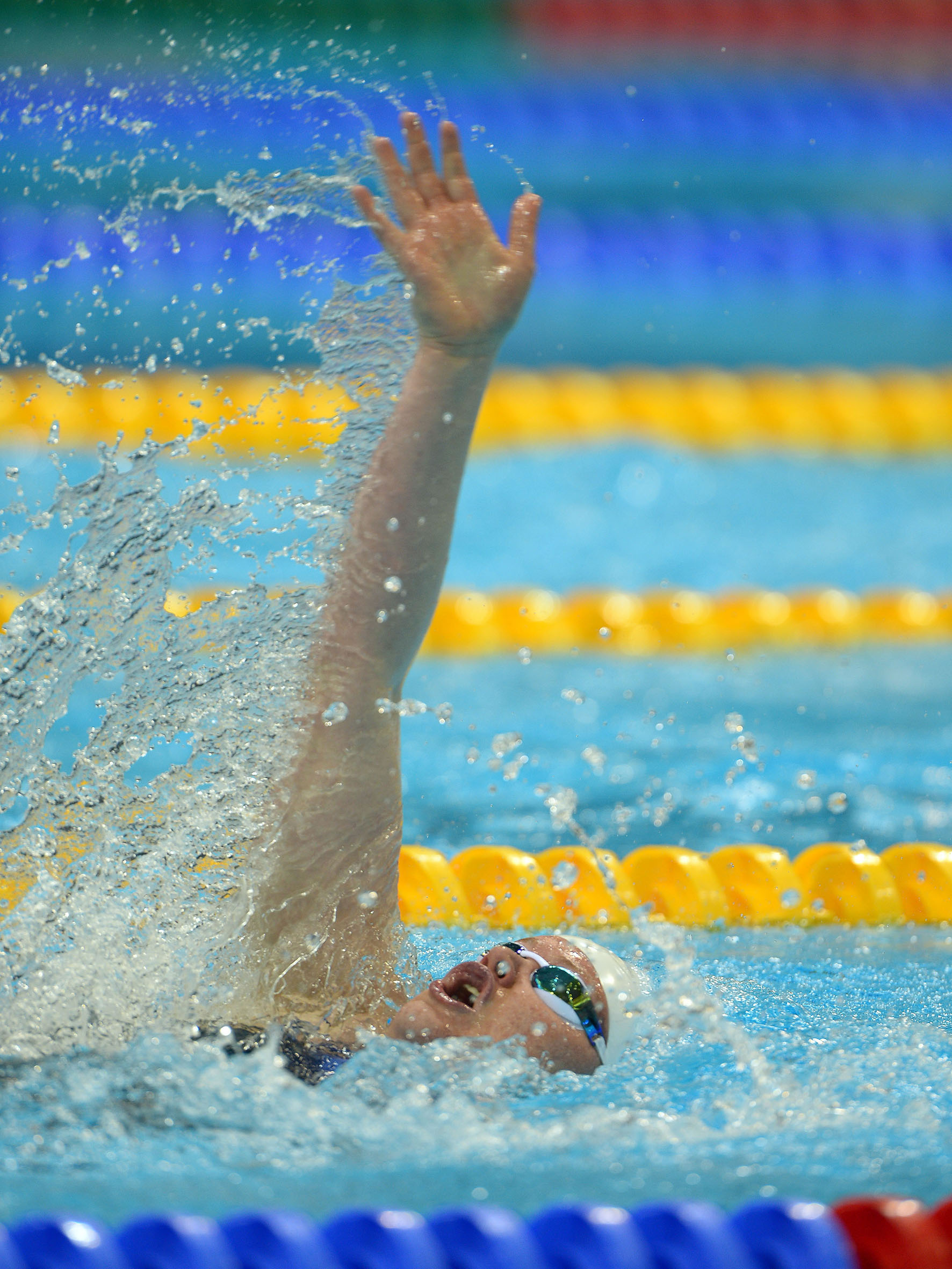
Leo at the 2012 London Paralympics

Leo competed at the 2011 Australian Short Course Championships. She has been selected to represent Australia at the 2012 Summer Olympics in the S14 200m freestyle and 100m backstroke swimming events. She was scheduled to leave for Wales on 10 August for a pre-Paralympics team training camp.
