= Magda Toeters =

Dutch swimmer (born 1986)

Personal information
- Nationality: Dutch
- Born: April 28, 1986 (age 40) Pyrzyce, Poland

Sport
- Disability: Intellectual impairment
- Disability class: S14, SB14, SM14
Medal record
Representing Netherlands
Paralympic Games
Silver medal – second place	2012 London	SB14 100 m breaststroke
IPC Swimming World Championships
Gold medal – first place	2015 Glasgow	SB14 100 m breaststroke
Silver medal – second place	2010 Eindhoven	SB14 100 m breaststroke
IPC Swimming European Championships
Silver medal – second place	2014 Eindhoven	SB14 100 m breaststroke
- Updated on December 14, 2014

Madgalena Toeters (born April 28, 1986) is a Dutch swimmer. She has an intellectual impairment and competes in the S14 disability class. At the 2010 IPC Swimming World Championships she came second in the 100 m breaststroke; she also won silver in this category at the 2012 London Paralympics and at the 2014 European Championships. She competed at the 2013 World Championships but did not win any medals.
