= Theresa Griffin (swimmer) =

New Zealand Paralympic swimmer

Theresa Herd
Personal information
- Born: 2 June 1988 (age 38) Hamilton, New Zealand

Sport
- Country: New Zealand
- Sport: Paralympic swimming
- Club: Te Rapa Rovers
- Coached by: Jo Sullivan
Medal record
Paralympic swimming
Representing New Zealand
World Championships
Bronze medal – third place	2002 Mar del Plata	100m breaststroke SB9

Theresa Herd (née Griffin, born 2 June 1988) is a New Zealand former Paralympic swimmer who competed in international swimming competitions. She is a World bronze medalist in breaststroke. She competed at the 2004 Summer Paralympics where she reached the finals of her four events but did not medal.

Herd was born with a misshapen pelvis and missing left hip socket.
