= Tamara Medarts =

Belgian Paralympic swimmer

Personal information
- Born: 23 February 1994 (age 32) Genk, Belgium
- Height: 1.70 m (5 ft 7 in)
- Weight: 52 kg (115 lb)

Sport
- Country: Belgium
- Sport: Paralympic swimming
- Disability class: S14
Medal record
Paralympic swimming
Representing Belgium
World Championships
| Bronze medal – third place | 2010 Eindhoven | Women's 100m breaststroke SB14 |
European Championships
| Bronze medal – third place | 2011 Berlin | Women's 100m breaststroke SB14 |

Tamara Medarts (born 23 February 1994) is a former Belgian Paralympic swimmer who competed in international level events. She was a World and European bronze medalist in breaststroke swimming and competed for Belgium at the 2012 Summer Paralympics where she reached the women's 100m breaststroke SB14 final but did not medal.
