= Natalie Massey =

British Paralympic swimmer

Personal information
- Nickname: Nemo
- Born: 23 February 1989 (age 37) Stockport, Great Britain
- Weight: 58 kg (128 lb)

Sport
- Country: Great Britain
- Sport: Paralympic swimming
- Disability class: S14
- Club: Aquabears Swimming Club, Rochdale
- Retired: 2013
Medal record
Paralympic swimming
Representing Great Britain
World Championships
Bronze medal – third place	2010 Eindhoven	Women's 200m freestyle S14
European Championships
Gold medal – first place	2009 Reykjavik	Women's 100m freestyle S14
Silver medal – second place	2009 Reykjavik	Women's 200m individual medley SM14
Silver medal – second place	2011 Berlin	Women's 200m freestyle S14
INAS World Swimming Championships
Bronze medal – third place	2004 Hong Kong	Women's 100m backstroke

Natalie Massey (born 23 February 1989) is a former British Paralympic swimmer who competed in international level events. Both of her parents were training coaches, Mick Massey has coached the national swimming team of Great Britain and her mother Sheila Massey is a former swimmer who trained alongside Sharron Davies. Massey has won three international medals and has competed at the 2012 Summer Paralympics and INAS World Swimming Championships.
