= Esther Morales Fernández =

Spanish Paralympic swimmer

Esther Morales
Personal information
- Full name: Esther Morales Fernández
- Nationality: Spanish
- Born: 9 August 1985 (age 41) Barcelona, Spain

Sport
- Country: Spain
- Sport: Swimming (S10)
Medal record
Swimming
Representing Spain
Paralympic Games
Bronze medal – third place	2004 Athens	50m freestyle - S10
Bronze medal – third place	2004 Athens	100m freestyle - S10
Bronze medal – third place	2008 Beijing	100m backstroke - S10
IPC World Championships 25m
Gold medal – first place	2009 Rio de Janeiro	50m freestyle - S10
Silver medal – second place	2009 Rio de Janeiro	100m freestyle - S10
Bronze medal – third place	2009 Rio de Janeiro	100m backstroke - S10
IPC European Championships
Gold medal – first place	2009 Reykjavik	50 m freestyle S10
Gold medal – first place	2009 Reykjavik	100 m freestyle S10
Gold medal – first place	2009 Reykjavik	100 m backstroke S10
Bronze medal – third place	2009 Reykjavik	4×100 m medley relay 34pts

Esther Morales Fernández (born 9 August 1985 in Barcelona) is an S10 swimmer from Spain.

== Personal ==
She was born on 9 August 1985 in Barcelona. In 2012, she lived in Palma de Mallorca, Balearic Islands.

== Swimming ==
In 2007, she competed at the IDM German Open. At the 2009 IPC European Swimming Championship in Reykjavík, Iceland, Sarai Gascón Moreno, Ana Rubio, Morales and Julia Castelló won a bronze medal in the 4x100 meter medley relay. In 2010, she competed at the Tenerife International Open. Before the 2010 Adapted Swimming World Championship in the Netherlands, she went to a swimming camp with the national team that was part of the Paralympic High Performance Program (HARP Program). Eindhoven, Netherlands hosted the 2010 World Swimming Championships at which she competed. She qualified for the 50 meter freestyle finals, where she finished fifth. She also competed in the 100 meter backstroke event. She was one of four Spanish swimmers at the World Championships that were affiliated with CTEIB, an institute created by the Government of the Balearic Islands intended to provide an education to elite high-performance sportspeople. From the Catalan region of Spain, she was a recipient of a 2012 Plan ADO scholarship. In 2013, she competed in the Championship of Spain by Autonomous Open Paralympic Swimming where she represented the Balearic Islands.

=== Paralympics ===
Morales competed at the 2000 Summer Paralympics, where she did not medal. She competed at the 2004 Summer Paralympics, where she won a pair of bronze medals in the 50 meter freestyle and the 100 meter backstroke. She competed at the 2008 Summer Paralympics, where she won a bronze in the 100 meter backstroke. She competed at the 2012 Summer Paralympics, where she did not medal. She, Sarai Gascón Moreno, Teresa Perales and Isabel Yingüa Hernández finished fourth in the 4x100 meter freestyle relay event. She competed at the 2012 Summer Paralympics in the 50 meter freestyle. Her first race was the 4 x 100 meter freestyle relay.
