= Magdalena Szczepińska =

Polish Paralympic swimmer

Personal information
- Born: 1984 (age 41–42) Białystok, Poland

Sport
- Country: Poland
- Sport: Paralympic swimming
- Event(s): Butterfly swimming Freestyle swimming
- Club: START Białystok
- Coached by: Halina Stepańczuk; Piotr Daszuta
Medal record
Paralympic swimming
Representing Poland
Paralympic Games
Gold medal – first place	2004 Athens	100m butterfly S10
World Championships
Silver medal – second place	2002 Mar del Plata	50m freestyle S10
Silver medal – second place	2002 Mar del Plata	100m freestyle S10

Magdalena Szczepińska (born 1984) is a Polish retired Paralympic swimmer who competed in international swimming competitions, she specialised in butterfly and freestyle swimming. She is a Paralympic champion, a double World silver medalist and four-time Polish champion. She competed at the 2004 Summer Paralympics.

She now works as a national swimming coach for START Białystok.
