= Kayla Clarke =

Australian Paralympic swimmer

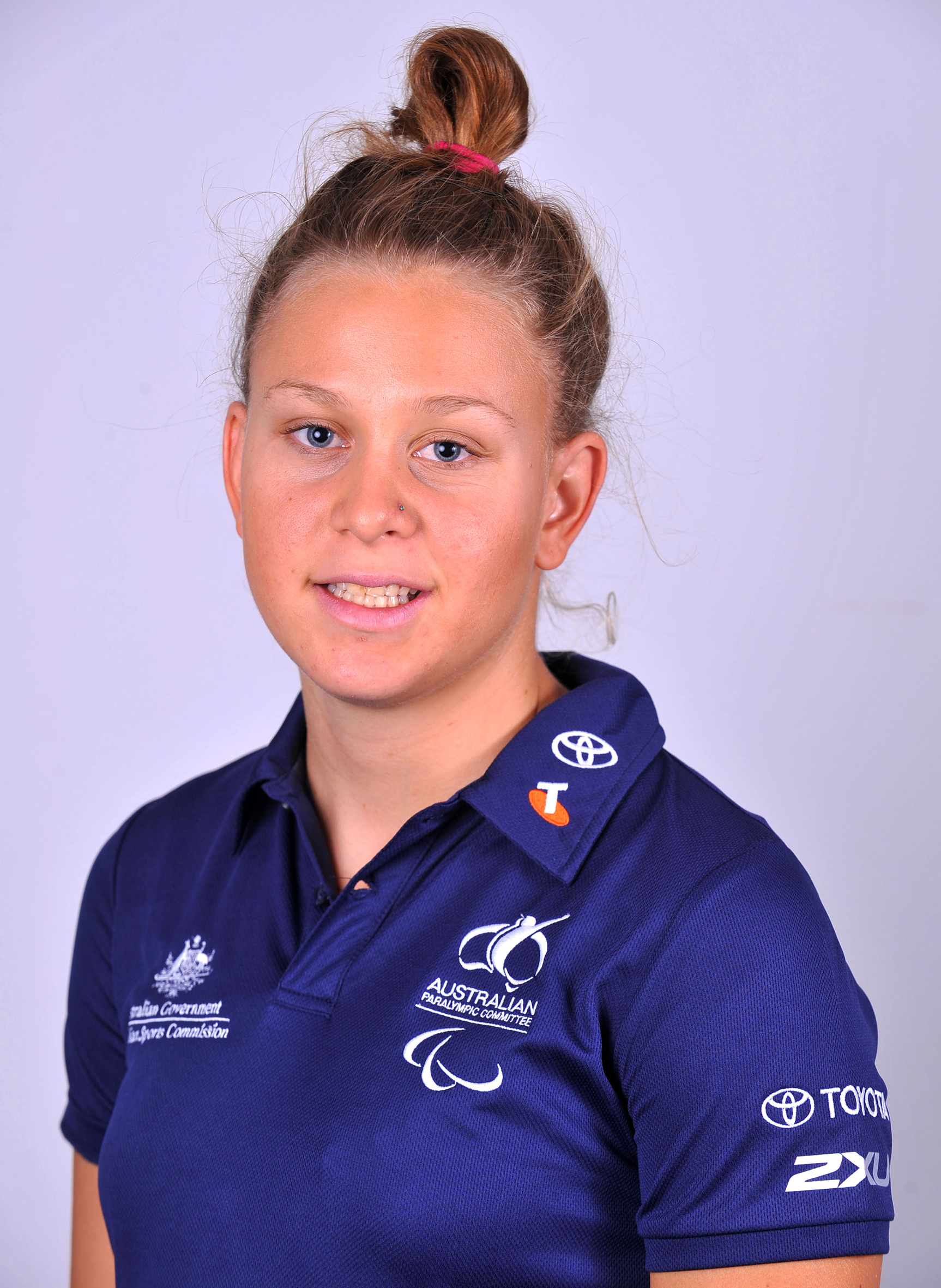
- 2012 Australian Paralympic team portrait of Clarke

Personal information
- Nationality: Australia
- Born: 6 August 1991 (age 34)

Sport
- Sport: Swimming
- Strokes: backstroke, breaststroke, freestyle
- Classifications: S14, SB14, SM14
- Club: Yeronga Park
- Coach: Rick Vanderzandt
Medal record
Women's paralympic swimming
Representing Australia
World Championships (LC)
Silver medal – second place	2010 Eindhoven	100 m backstroke S14

Kayla Clarke (born 6 August 1991) is an Indigenous Australian swimmer who represented Australia at the 2012 Summer Paralympics in swimming, and has medalled at the 2010 Australian Disability Age Group Nationals, and 2010 International Paralympic Swimming World Championships, 2009 Queensland State Championships, 2009 Queensland Secondary School Titles, and 2009 Global Games. She competes in a number of events, including the 100m freestyle, 100m backstroke, 100m breaststroke, 100m butterfly and 200m individual medley.

== Personal ==
Clarke was born in Silkstone, Queensland. She has an intellectual disability. She attended Ipswich Central High School and Bremer State High School, and was named the 2009–10 Ipswich News YoungStar Sports winner.

== Swimming ==
Clarke started swimming competitively in 2007, and competes in the S14 classification. She was a member of the Woogaroo Swimming Club, and was coached by Tony Keogh, who became her coach in 2008. She has a swimming scholarship with the Queensland Academy of Sport, is involved in the Australian Institute of Sport program, and received A$20,000 in Australian Government Direct Athlete Support (DAS) funds in the 2011–12 financial year. One of her major swimming rivals is fellow Australian swimmer Taylor Corry.

At the 2009 Queensland State Championships, she won five gold medals in her classification races. The Queensland Secondary School Titles that year ended with her winning seven first-place finishes, and she earned five gold medals, a silver medal two bronze medals at the 2009 Global Games.

In 2010, she won eight gold and two silver medals at Australian Disability Age Group Nationals, and competed in the International Paralympic Swimming World Championships, where she finished second with a personal best time of 1:11.13 in the S14 100m backstroke event. She also finished fourth in the 200m freestyle and fifth in the 100m breaststroke.

Clarke became affiliated with the Yeronga Park Club in 2011 in an effort to make the Paralympic Games, and switched coaches, taking on Rick Van Der Zant as her new coach. The 2011 Australian national championships saw her win six golds in seven events, including the 100m freestyle, 100m backstroke, 100m breaststroke, 100m butterfly and 200m individual medley. She competed in the inaugural 2011 Para Pan Pacific Championships, where she finished first in the S14 200m freestyle event, and at the 2011 Can-Am Swimming Open, in which she posted first-place finishes in the 100m backstroke and 200m freestyle events.

Clarke was selected to represent Australia at the 2012 Summer Paralympics in the S14 100m backstroke, 200m freestyle and 100m breaststroke events. These were her first Paralympic Games, and she was the only female swimmer from Queensland. Going into the Games, she was ranked second in the world in the 100m backstroke. She trained for the Games in China in order to acclimatise, and participated in a two-week-long national team training camp in Cardiff prior to the start. Support for her Paralympic efforts came from sponsors including TogTastic Racing and Training Swimwear. She made the finals in all three events, but finished outside the medals, being placed fourth in the 200m freestyle and 100m breaststroke, and sixth in the 100m backstroke.

Clarke won five gold and a silver medal at the 2014 Pan Pacific Para-swimming Championships in Pasadena, California. After the Championships, she underwent shoulder surgery.

=== Personal bests ===
Personal bests as of 16 September 2012:

Course	Event	Time	Meet	Swim date	Reference
Long	50m Backstroke	00:34.18	2011 McDonald's QLD Sprint Championships	5 February 2011	
Long	100m Backstroke	01:11.04	2012 Summer Paralympic Games	31 August 2012	
Long	200m Backstroke	02:35.2	VORGEE NT Open & Age 2011	17 March 2011	
Long	50m Breaststroke	00:39.83	2012 Brisbane Sprint Championships	28 January 2012	
Long	100m Breaststroke	01:22.87	2012 Summer Paralympic Games	6 September 2012	
Long	50m Butterfly	00:31.02	2012 EnergyAustralia Swimming Championships	17 March 2012	
Long	100m Butterfly	01:10.3	2011 McDonald's Qld Swimming Championships	14 December 2011	
Long	50m Freestyle	00:28.66	2012 EnergyAustralia Swimming Championships	16 March 2012	
Long	100m Freestyle	01:02.5	2012 EnergyAustralia Swimming Championships	19 March 2012	
Long	200m Freestyle	02:15.33	2012 Summer Paralympic Games	2 September 2012	
Long	400m Freestyle	04:52.3	2011 McDonald's Qld Swimming Championships	14 December 2011	
Long	200m Medley	02:33.0	2012 EnergyAustralia Swimming Championships	20 March 2012	
Short	50m Backstroke	00:33.38	2011 Australian Short Course Championships	3 July 2011	
Short	100m Backstroke	01:11.4	2010 Telstra Australian Short Course	14 July 2010	
Short	50m Breaststroke	00:39.14	2011 Australian Short Course Championships	2 July 2011	
Short	100m Breaststroke	01:24.0	2011 Australian Short Course Championships	3 July 2011	
Short	50m Butterfly	00:32.29	2010 Telstra Australian Short Course	14 July 2010	
Short	100m Butterfly	01:10.1	2010 Telstra Australian Short Course	14 July 2010	
Short	50m Freestyle	00:29.04	2011 Australian Short Course Championships	1 July 2011	
Short	100m Freestyle	01:03.1	2010 Telstra Australian Short Course	14 July 2010	
Short	200m Medley	02:36.7	2010 Telstra Australian Short Course	14 July 2010	
