= Taylor Corry =

Australian Paralympic swimmer

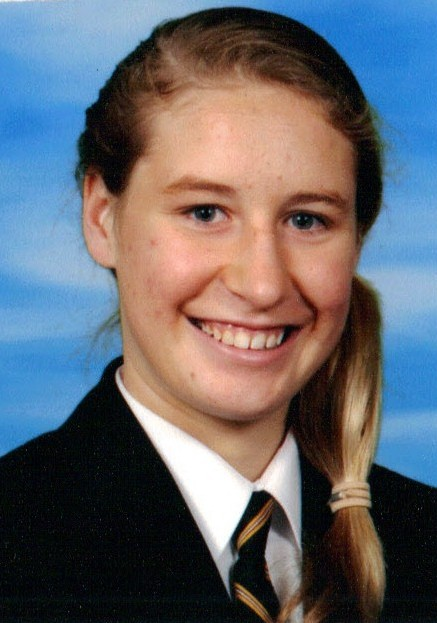
- Taylor Corry in 2011

Personal information
- Full name: Taylor Corry
- Nickname: Tralier Park
- Nationality: Australia
- Born: 31 January 1995 (age 31) Anna Bay, New South Wales, Australia

Sport
- Sport: Swimming
- Strokes: Backstroke, freestyle
- Classifications: S14, SB14, SM14
- Club: Nelson Bay RSL
- Coach: Jan Cameron
Medal record
Women's paralympic swimming
Representing Australia
Paralympic Games
Silver medal – second place	2012 London	200 m freestyle S14
Silver medal – second place	2012 London	100 m backstroke S14
World Championships (LC)
Silver medal – second place	2013 Montreal	200 m freestyle S14
Bronze medal – third place	2015 Glasgow	100 m backstroke S14
Bronze medal – third place	2019 London	Mixed 4 x 100 m Freestyle S14

Taylor Corry (born 31 January 1995) is an Australian S14 swimmer. At the 2012 Summer Paralympics, she won two silver medals.

== Personal ==
Corry was born on 31 January 1995, and grew up in Anna Bay, New South Wales. She has an intellectual disability. She attended St Philips Cristian College, Port Stephens.

Her older brother is Keiran Corry, who, like Taylor, he has represented Australia at the 2011 Global Games in swimming where he won three silver medals and one bronze.

== Swimming ==
Corry is an S14-classified swimmer. She has been coached by Tom Davis since December 2010 a who continued to coach her going into the 2012 Summer Paralympic.

Corry started swimming in 2004. She earned three gold medals and two silver medals at the 2009 National Underage Championships. The following year, she competed in the 2010 Australian Short Course Championships.

In 2011, most days, Corry was training two hours a day, twice a day. That year, she competed in the 2011 NSW State Age Short Course Championships and 2011 New South Wales State Open Championships. She went on to compete in the 2011 Australian Underage National Championships where she earned seven gold medals. One of her gold medals came in the Girls 15–16 years 50m backstroke event, where she had a time of 34.81 seconds. Another gold medal came in the Girls 15–16 50m butterfly event where she had a time of 33.26 seconds.

Corry also competed in the 2011 Australian Short Course Championships where she set a world record for her classification in the 50-metre multi-class backstroke with a time of 31.87 seconds.

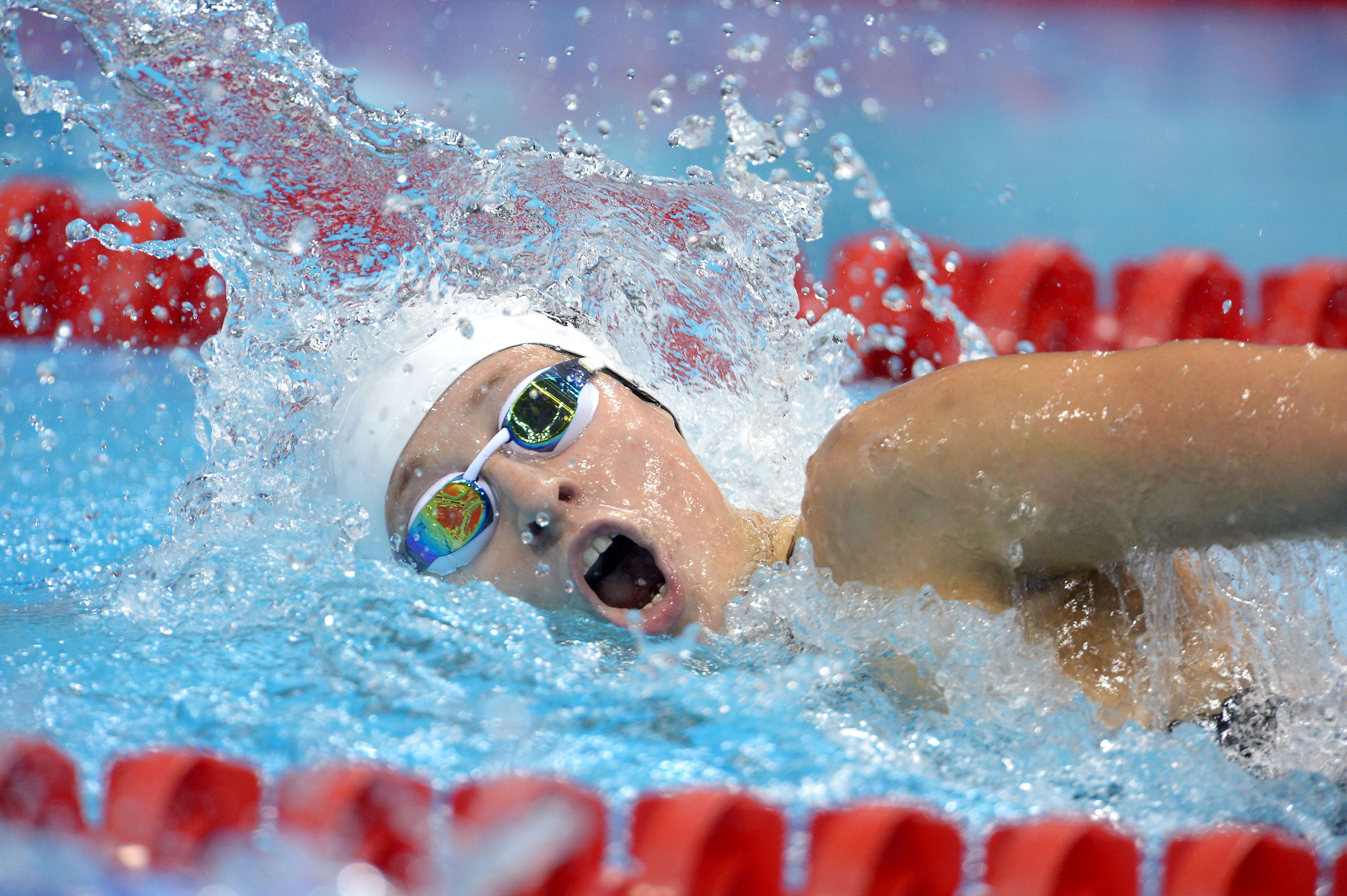
Corry at the 2012 London Paralympics

Corry made her national team debut in 2011 at the Italian hosted Global Games where she earned eight gold medals and one silver medal. The gold medals came in the 50-metre backstroke, 100-metre backstroke, 100-metre freestyle events. Her other gold medals came in relay events. Her silver medal came in the 50-metre freestyle event. In 2011, on a few days' rest following the Global Games, she competed in the Canberra hosted Australian Multi Class National championships where she earned gold medals in the 50-metre butterfly, 50-, 100-metre backstroke, 50-, 100-metre freestyle and 200-metre individual medley events. She competed at the 2012 NSW Country Championships. and then competed at the Australian National Swimming Championships, where she finished third in the 50m freestyle Multi Class event with a time of 29.16. At the 2012 Summer Paralympics, she won two silver medals in the Women's 100 m Backstroke and Women's 200 m Freestyle S14 events. and participated in a local Rotary Club fundraiser to help cover her costs to compete at the Paralympics.

Corry competing at the 2013 IPC Swimming World Championships in Montreal, Canada won a bronze medal in the Women's 200m Freestyle S14. At the 2015 IPC Swimming World Championships in Glasgow, Scotland, she won a bronze medal in the Women's 100 m Backstroke S14. She finished fourth in the Women's 200m Freestyle S14 and Women's 200m Individual Medley SM14.

=== Personal bests ===
Personal best times as of 30 July 2012

Course	Event	Time	Meet	Swim Date	Reference
Long	100m Backstroke	01:11.1	2012 Australia Swimming Championships	15-Mar-12	
Short	100m Backstroke	01:09.6	2011 NSW State Age SC Championships	14-Aug-11	
Long	100m Breaststroke	01:39.2	2011 NSW State Open Championsh	11-Feb-11	
Long	100m Freestyle	01:02.1	2012 EnergyAustralia Swimming Championships	19-Mar-12	
Short	100m Freestyle	01:03.2	2012 NSW SC Country Championships	8-Jul-12	
Long	200m Backstroke	02:36.2	2012 NSW Country Championships-Individual	26-Feb-12	
Short	200m Backstroke	02:32.2	2012 NSW SC Country Championships	8-Jul-12	
Long	200m Freestyle	02:14.5	2012 EnergyAustralia Swimming Championships	21-Mar-12	
Short	200m Freestyle	02:15.2	2012 NSW SC Country Championships	8-Jul-12	
Long	200m Medley	02:43.7	2012 NSW State Open Championships All Events	10-Feb-12	
Short	200m Medley	02:44.5	2010 Telstra Australian Short Course	14-Jul-10	
Short	400m Freestyle	04:42.4	2012 NSW SC Country Championships	7-Jul-12	
Long	50m Backstroke	32.64	2012 EnergyAustralia Swimming Championships	20-Mar-12	
Short	50m Backstroke	31.87	2011 Australian Short Course Championships	3-Jul-11	
Long	50m Breaststroke	42.49	2012 NSW Country Championships-Individual	25-Feb-12	
Short	50m Breaststroke	40.55	2011 NSW Country SC Championships	9-Jul-11	
Long	50m Butterfly	31	2012 EnergyAustralia Swimming Championships	17-Mar-12	
Short	50m Butterfly	31.99	2010 Telstra Australian Short Course	14-Jul-10	
Long	50m Freestyle	28.87	2012 EnergyAustralia Swimming Championships	16-Mar-12	
Short	50m Freestyle	29.08	2011 Australian Short Course Championships	1-Jul-11	
