= Katarzyna Pawlik =

Polish Paralympic swimmer

Personal information
- Nickname: Kasia
- Born: 17 February 1989 (age 37) Bytom, Poland

Sport
- Country: Poland
- Sport: Paralympic swimming
- Disability class: S10, SB9, SM10
- Coached by: Wojciech Seidel
Medal record
Paralympic swimming
Representing Poland
Paralympic Games
Gold medal – first place	2004 Athens	Women's 400m freestyle S10
Gold medal – first place	2008 Beijing	Women's 400m freestyle S10
Silver medal – second place	2004 Athens	Women's 100m butterfly S10
Silver medal – second place	2004 Athens	Women's 100m freestyle S10
Silver medal – second place	2008 Beijing	Women's 50m freestyle S10
Silver medal – second place	2008 Beijing	Women's 100m freestyle S10
Bronze medal – third place	2008 Beijing	Women's 200m individual medley SM10
World Championships
Silver medal – second place	2006 Durban	Women's 200m individual medley SM10
Bronze medal – third place	2006 Durban	Women's 100m butterfly S10
Bronze medal – third place	2006 Durban	Women's 400m freestyle S10
Bronze medal – third place	2010 Eindhoven	Women's 400m freestyle S10

Katarzyna Pawlik (born 17 February 1989) is a former butterfly, freestyle and medley Polish Paralympic swimmer who competed in international level events.
