= Susan Beth Scott =

American Paralympic swimmer

Personal information
- Nationality: United States
- Born: May 27, 1992 (age 34) Cape Girardeau, Missouri
- Height: 5 ft 10 in (1.78 m)

Sport
- Sport: Swimming
- Strokes: Backstroke, freestyle, medley
Medal record
Athletics
Paralympic Games
Silver medal – second place	2012 London	4x100m freestyle relay 34pts
Bronze medal – third place	2008 Beijing	400m freestyle S10
Bronze medal – third place	2012 London	400m freestyle S10
Bronze medal – third place	2012 London	4x100m medley relay 34pts
IPC World Championships
Gold medal – first place	2010 Eindhoven	4x100m medley relay 34pts
Silver medal – second place	2010 Eindhoven	400m freestyle S10
Bronze medal – third place	2010 Eindhoven	100m backstroke S10
Parapan American Games
Gold medal – first place	2007 Rio de Janeiro	400m freestyle S10
Silver medal – second place	2007 Rio de Janeiro	50m freestyle S10
Silver medal – second place	2007 Rio de Janeiro	100m freestyle S10
Silver medal – second place	2007 Rio de Janeiro	100m backstroke S10
Silver medal – second place	2007 Rio de Janeiro	200m individual medley SM10

Susan Beth Scott (born May 27, 1992 in Cape Girardeau, Missouri), is an American Paralympic swimmer.

Susan Scott was born May 27, 1992 in Cape Girardeau, Missouri. At the age of 7 months, she was diagnosed with spina bifida and underwent surgery. Four years later she required further surgery. In the 11-12 age group category, she participated in the 50-metre freestyle at the Central Municipal Pool where she placed twelfth and finished tenth in 800-metre freestyle.

== International competition ==
She competed at World Championships in 2006 in South Africa, before moving to the Olympic Training Center to swim for Jimi Flowers. In 2008, she became an ESPY Award nominee for being the Best Female Athlete with a Disability. In 2009, Scott held a World record in 1500 m freestyle and next year won one golds for 34 point medley at 2010 World Championships. She won a silver medal at the 2010 World's for the 400 metre freestyle and a bronze medal for the 100 m backstroke.

== Paralympic competition ==
Her first Olympic games participation was at the 2008 Summer Paralympics where she won a bronze medal for 400 m freestyle.

She received a silver and two bronze medals for her participation at 2012 Summer Paralympics in London.
