= Hannah Macdougall =

Australian Paralympic swimmer

Hannah MacDougall
Personal information
- Nationality: Australia
- Born: 31 July 1987 (age 39) Melbourne, Australia
Medal record
Representing Australia
Women's para-swimming
Paralympic Games
Bronze medal – third place	2004 Athens	4x100 m Medley 34 pts
Women's para-cycling
Road World Championships
Silver medal – second place	2018 Maniago	Time Trial C4
Silver medal – second place	2018 Maniago	Road Race C4
Women's paratriathlon
World Championships
Bronze medal – third place	2025 Wollongong	PTS4
Oceania Championships
Gold medal – first place	2025 Mooloolaba	PTS4

Hannah MacDougall (born 31 July 1987) is an Australian Paralympic swimming, cycling and triathlon competitor.

== Personal ==
She was born on 31 July 1987 in Melbourne. She attended Korowa Anglican Girls' School. In 2010, she completed a double degree in the Bachelor of Exercise and Sport Science/Bachelor of Commerce – Sport Management at Deakin University. In 2017, she completed a PhD at La Trobe University focusing on athlete well-being, as well as working part-time as an Athlete Career and Education advisor at the Victorian Institute of Sport. She is a Red Dust role model.

Macdougall's stated that: Participating in sport has been an extremely empowering experience for me; it has allowed me to increase my confidence, strengthen my social support networks, and provided meaning to my life. She credits Don Elgin as providing guidance and mentoring during her Paralympic career.

== Career ==
=== Swimming ===
Macdougall was born without a right foot and fibula and competes in S10 swimming events. Macdougall became involved in competitive swimming in 1998. She represented Australia at the 2002 FESPIC Games and won two gold medals. In 2002, she broke the world record in 50m Women's Backstroke S10. She won a bronze medal at the 2004 Athens Games in the Women's 4 × 100 m Medley 34 pts event. At the 2006 IPC Swimming World Championships, she was a finalist in Women's 100m Backstroke s10. She competed at the 2008 Beijing Games but did not win any medals. In 2009, she competed at the 1st World Short Course Swimming Championships and won a bronze medal in the Women's 100m Individual Medley and was a finalist in Women's 100m backstroke, Women's 200m Individual Medley and Women's 4 × 100 m Medley Relay.

Macdougall has stated during her swimming career she had over come surgery, shoulder injuries, missing team selections by .8 of a second, and dislocating a kneecap only a week out from the Athens Paralympic Games. Macdougall has also been involved in swimming teaching. She has been a Victorian Institute of Sport scholarship holder since 2002.

=== Cycling ===
In 2010, she took up cycling in the C4 classification. After only three weeks of training, she won two gold medals at the Victorian Championships and four weeks later won two silver medals at the Australian Para Road Cycling Championships in the Women's Time Trial and Road Race. In 2011, won two bronze medals in the Women's Time Trial and Pursuit at the 2011 Australian Track Cycling Championships. In 2012, two bronze medals in the Women's Time Trial and Road Race at the Australian Para Road Cycling Championships. She has been selected to represent Australia at the 2016 UCI Para-cycling Track World Championships in Montichiari, Italy.

At the 2017 UCI Para-cycling Road World Championships, Pietermaritzburg, South Africa, she finished fourth in the Women's Time Trial C4 and fifth in the Women's Road Race C4-5. She won silver medals in the Women's Time Trial C4 and Women's Road Race C4 at 2018 UCI Para-cycling Road World Championships, Maniago, Italy.

At the 2019 UCI Para-cycling Road World Championships, Emmen, Netherlands, she finished fourth in the Women's Time Trial C4 and fifth in the Women's Road Race C4.

== Triathlon ==
Macdougall is classified as a PTS4 triathlete. In 2022, she won the Oceania Championships in the Women's PTS4 and won her first World Cup in 2023 at Málaga. At the 2025 World Triathlon Para Championships in Wollongong, she won the bronze medal in the Wiomen's PTS4.

== Recognition ==
- Co-captain of the Australian Paralympic Swim Team for both the 2006 IPC Swimming World Championships, and 2008 Beijing Games
- City of Stonnington Young Citizen of the Year in 2001.
- Leader Sports Star of the Year in the Stonnington District in 2005 & 2002
- In August 2017, Macdougall received the Athletes in Excellence Award from The Foundation for Global Sports Development in recognition of her community service efforts and work with youth.
- In November 2017, she was awarded the Victorian Institute of Sport Sarah Tait Spirit Award.
- In June 2022, the swimming pool within the new Sports and Wellbeing Centre at Korowa Anglican Girls' School, where Hannah attended, was named the "Hannah Macdougall Swimming Pool".
- In 2025, awarded Victorian Institute of Sport 2XU Performance Lifestyle Award for excellence from an athlete in their studies, career ambitions, and/or work setting whilst pursuing their sporting career.
- In 2026, awarded with Tara Neyland the Elite Sportsperson of the Year at the Victorian Disability Sport & Recreation Awards.

== External ==
- Hannah Macdougall Motivational Website
- World Triathlon Results
