= Viera Mikulášiková =

Slovak Paralympic swimmer (born 1981)

Personal information
- Nickname: Veve
- Born: 4 September 1981 (age 44) Bratislava, Czechoslovakia
- Home town: Bratislava, Slovakia

Sport
- Country: Slovakia
- Sport: Paralympic swimming
- Disability: Sepsis survivor
- Disability class: S10, SB9, SM10
- Club: J&T Sportteam
- Coached by: Martin Saldon
- Retired: 2010
Medal record
Paralympic swimming
Representing Slovakia
Paralympic Games
Silver medal – second place	2004 Athens	Women's 100m freestyle S10
World Championships
Bronze medal – third place	1998 Christchurch	Women's 100m butterfly S10
Bronze medal – third place	2006 Durban	Women's 100m breaststroke SB9

Viera Mikulášiková (born 4 September 1981) is a former Slovak Paralympic swimmer who competed in international level events. She has an impaired left leg due to blood poisoning a few days after she was born which led to her having no left femur.
