= Kat Lewis =

Australian Paralympic swimmer

Kat Cecchini
Personal information
- Nationality: Australia
- Born: Katrina Lewis; 17 June 1988 (age 38) Canberra, Australian Capital Territory
Medal record
Swimming
Paralympic Games
Bronze medal – third place	2004 Athens	Women's 4x100 m Freestyle 34 pts
Bronze medal – third place	2008 Beijing	Women's 50 m Freestyle S10
IPC Swimming World Championships
Gold medal – first place	2002 Mar Del Plata	Women's 4x100 m Medley Relay 34pts
Silver medal – second place	2002 Mar Del Plata	Women's 400 m Freestyle S10
Bronze medal – third place	2002 Mar Del Plata	Women's 100 m Freestyle S10

Katrina Cecchini (née Lewis; born 17 June 1988) is an Australian Paralympic swimmer. She was born in Canberra with mild cerebral palsy due to being born ten weeks premature. She started swimming at the suggestion of a neighbour. She attended St Mary MacKillop College, Canberra, graduating in 2006.

Her philosophy is "You may be classed as disabled but never take the 'dis' out of disabled, take the 'able' and you will get where you want to be."

== Career ==
At the 2002 IPC Swimming World Championships in Mar Del Plata, Argentina, she won a silver and bronze medal. She competed in five events and won a bronze medal at the 2004 Athens Games in the Women's 4 × 100 m Freestyle 34 pts event. She won a bronze medal at the 2008 Beijing Games in the Women's 50 m Freestyle S10 event. She had an Australian Institute of Sport paralympic swimming scholarship.

At the 2006 Commonwealth Games in Melbourne, she finished fifth in both the Women's 50 m Freestyle and 100 m Freestyle events.

== Recognition ==
- Dawn Fraser Junior Female Award for 2001 and 2004
- 2001 Margaret Whitfield Award
- Clubs ACT Sport Star Award for 2002, 2003 and 2005
