= Ashley Owens =

American Paralympic swimmer

Personal information
- Nationality: United States
- Born: October 2, 1989 (age 37)

Sport
- Sport: Swimming
- Strokes: Freestyle, medley
- Club: Cobb County Stingrays; Tara Tarpons
- College team: Catawba College
- Coach: Judy Burdette (early career); Betsy Graham (Catawba); Doug Gjertsen (later career)
Medal record
Athletics
Paralympic Games
Gold medal – first place	2004 Athens	4x100m freestyle relay 34pts
Gold medal – first place	2008 Beijing	100m freestyle S10
Silver medal – second place	2008 Beijing	400m freestyle S10
Bronze medal – third place	2004 Athens	400m freestyle S10
IPC World Championships
Gold medal – first place	2006 Durban	100m freestyle S10
Gold medal – first place	2006 Durban	400m freestyle S10
Gold medal – first place	2006 Durban	4x100m freestyle relay 34pts
Gold medal – first place	2006 Durban	4x100m medley relay 34pts
Gold medal – first place	2010 Eindhoven	400m freestyle S10
Gold medal – first place	2010 Eindhoven	4x100m freestyle relay 34pts
Gold medal – first place	2010 Eindhoven	4x100m medley relay 34pts
Silver medal – second place	2006 Durban	50m freestyle S10
Silver medal – second place	2010 Eindhoven	Women's freestyle swimming

Ashley Owens is an American Paralympic swimmer from Georgia who medaled in both the 2004 Athens and 2008 Beijing paralympics.

Owens was born October 2, 1989, and grew up in greater Atlanta, Georgia, graduating Stockbridge High School in 2008. She began swimming competitively at age eight, continuing in middle school and credits her athletic accomplishments to her first swim coach, Judy Burdette. Owens says Burdette pushed her to excel in the sport. Burdette coached the Tara Tarpon Swim team in Clayton County, with Ashley representing the team by July 2005. The Tarpon team was based in Jonesboro, Georgia, eight miles East of Stockbridge. Burdette was a former competitive swimmer, a physical therapist, aquatic therapist, and swim coach, who began officially coaching the Tara Tarpons beginning in 1995. By age 7, she swam for greater Atlanta's Cobb County's Stingrays team where she placed in the 25 yard backstroke, but by age 10 would place frequently in the 100-yard and 200 yard events, where she would continue to excel. In March 1996, she won an event at the Georgia State Invitational Swim Meet as a member of the Cobb County based Stingrays swim team.

== 2004, 2008 Paralympics ==
At a career highpoint, Owens qualified for and competed in the 2004 Paralympic Games at the age of 14. At the 2004 Summer Paralympics in Athens, Greece, Owens won one gold in the 4x100 meter freestyle and one bronze medal in the 400 meter freestyle, as an S10 entry. Owens swam the anchor leg of the 4x100 meter freestyle relay in a time of 1:06.18, the fastest time for an American leg. The Canadian team finished second with a combined time of 1:13, with the Canadians taking the bronze.

At the 2008 Paralympic trials in Minneapolis, she qualified in freestyle events. At the 2008 Paralympic games in Beijing, China she received one gold in the 100 meter freestyle with a time of 1:01:57 and one silver medal in the 400 meter freestyle in the S10 classification.

== Catawba College ==
Owens attended Catawba College, in Salisbury, North Carolina, enrolling around 2009, where she continued to compete on the swim team under team coach Betsy Graham, often attending practices twice a day, six days a week. In her Sophomore year, she planned to major in psychology, and attend graduate school. Swimming for Catawba in January, 2010, Owens swam a 5:23.28 for the 500 yard freestyle placing first in the event in a meet against Lenior-Rhyne University.

=== International competition ===
In 2006, she set a new Pan-American record in the 1500 meter freestyle which qualified her to participate in the IPC Swimming World Championships in Durban, South Africa. During the same year she won a silver medal for the 50 meter freestyle and four gold medals. In 2008, at the Can-Am Championships, in Victoria, British Columbia she set world records in two freestyles events in her paralympic category; the 200 metre, and the 400 meter.

Sweeping several freestyle events at the 2010 IPC Swimming World Championships in Eindhoven, Netherlands, she earned a gold medal in 4 x 100 meter freestyle and medley relays, a gold in the 400 meter freestyle and a silver in the 100 meter freestyle.

In 2023, Owens married fellow paralympic game gold medalist Lantz Lamback.
