= Anne Polinario =

Canadian Paralympic swimmer

Personal information
- Nationality: Canada
- Born: 5 August 1979 (age 46) Havana, Cuba

Sport
- Sport: Para swimming
Medal record
Representing Canada
Para swimming
Paralympic Games
Gold medal – first place	2004 Athens	50m freestyle S10
Gold medal – first place	2004 Athens	100m freestyle S10
Gold medal – first place	2008 Beijing	50m freestyle S10
Silver medal – second place	2004 Athens	100m backstroke S10
Silver medal – second place	2004 Athens	4x100 m freestyle relay
Silver medal – second place	2004 Athens	4x100 m medley relay
Bronze medal – third place	2000 Sydney	50m freestyle S10
Bronze medal – third place	2000 Sydney	100m freestyle S10
Bronze medal – third place	2000 Sydney	100m backstroke S10
Parapan American Games
Gold medal – first place	2007 Rio de Janeiro	50m freestyle S10
Gold medal – first place	2007 Rio de Janeiro	100m freestyle S10
Gold medal – first place	2007 Rio de Janeiro	100m backstroke S10
Gold medal – first place	2007 Rio de Janeiro	200m individual medley SM10
Silver medal – second place	2007 Rio de Janeiro	400m freestyle S10
- Updated on 13 May 2025

Anne Cecile Polinario (born 5 August 1979) is an S10 classified Canadian para swimmer. Born to parents on the Cuban national swimming team, she caught on and competed for Canada in the same sport. Polinario has competed at the 2000, 2004 and 2008 Summer Paralympics.

== Personal life ==
Polinario was born on 5 August 1979 in Havana, Cuba and now resides in Montreal, Quebec. She had foot drop in her left foot at birth. She started swimming at a young age and later moved to Canada as a teenager. She made it into the Canadian national swimming team, while her mother and father Rafael Polinario were in the Cuban national swimming team.

== Career ==
Polinario first competed at 2000 Sydney, where she won three bronze medals in the 100m backstroke, 100m freestyle, and 50m freestyle races. At 2004 Athens, she won three gold and two silver medals. "I was pretty happy. I had a bit of tears in my eyes. It was pretty emotional for sure," she said after she won her first Paralympic gold medal. In her final Paralympics appearance, at 2008 Beijing, she competed in three races but only won one medal, a gold. "I was disappointed with my first two races so I'm glad to finish with a victory, It was a very good race for me. But I'll need to work harder to get that world record," she said after her victory.
