= 2009 IPC Swimming European Championships – Women's 100 metre freestyle =

The women's 100 metre freestyle at the 2009 IPC Swimming European Championships was held at Laugardalslaug in Reykjavik from 18 to 24 October.

== Medalists ==
| Event | Gold | | Silver | | Bronze | |
|---|---|---|---|---|---|---|
| S2 | Darya Kopayeva (S2); Ukraine | 2:38.93 WR | Iryna Sotska (S1); Ukraine | 2:41.33 WR | Nataliia Semenovav (S2); Ukraine | 2:52.87 |
| S4 | Jennie Ekstrom; Sweden | 1:56.87 | Karolina Hamer; Poland | 1:58.80 | Cecilie Kristiansen; Denmark | 2:20.45 |
| S5 | Běla Hlaváčková; Czech Republic | 1:24.92 | Lisette Teunissen; Netherlands | 1:36.13 | Maria Joao Goncalves; Portugal | 1:44.73 |
| S6 | Ellie Simmonds; Great Britain | 1:17.97 | Natalie Jones; Great Britain | 1.21:14 | Sarah Louise Rung; Norway | 1:24.86 |
| S7 | Kirsten Bruhn; Germany | 1:13.69 | Verena Schott; Germany | 1:14.13 | Oxana Guseva; Russia | 1:19.51 |
| S8 | Heather Frederiksen; Great Britain | 1:07.51 | Cecilie Drabsch Norland; Norway | 1:12.27 | Emma Hollis; Great Britain | 1:12.99 |
| S9 | Louise Watkin; Great Britain | 1:03.44 | Stephanie Millward; Great Britain | 1:03.65 | Sarai Gascon Moreno; Spain | 1:04.87 |
| S10 | Esther Morales Fernandez; Spain | 1:03.74 | Elodie Lorandi; France | 1:03.77 | Katarzyna Pawlik; Poland | 1:05.05 |
| S11 | Cecilia Camellini; Italy | 1:09.67 | Daniela Schulte; Germany | 1:10.00 | Chantal Cavin; Switzerland | 1:13.05 |
| S12 | Oxana Savchenko; Russia | 1:01.10 | Anna Efimenko; Russia | 1:02.00 | Joanna Mendak; Poland | 1:02.51 |
| S13 | Iryna Balashova; Ukraine | 1:03.45 | Lauren Hobbins; Great Britain | 1:06.49 | Begona Curero Sastre; Spain | 1:06.57 |
| S14 | Natalie Massey; Great Britain | 1:04.12 | Magda Toeters; Netherlands | 1:04.94 | Marlou van der Kulk; Netherlands | 1:06:62 |

== See also ==
- List of IPC world records in swimming
