= Swimming at the 2008 Summer Paralympics – Men's 4 × 100 metre medley relay – 34 points =

Men's 4x100m Medley Relay 34 points at the XIII Paralympic Games
- Venue: Beijing National Aquatics Center
- Dates: 15 September
- Competitors: 9
- Winning time: 4:11.90

Medalists
| 1st place, gold medalist(s) | | Australia (AUS); Matthew Cowdrey, Rick Pendleton, Peter Leek, Ben Austin |
| 2nd place, silver medalist(s) | | China (CHN); Guo Zhi, Lin Furong, Wei Yanpeng, Wang Xiaofu |
| 3rd place, bronze medalist(s) | | Ukraine (UKR); Ievgen Poltavskyi, Andriy Kalyna, Andriy Sirovatchenko, Taras Yastremskyy |

The men's 4 × 100 m medley relay 34 points event at the 2008 Summer Paralympics took place at the Beijing National Aquatics Center on 15 September. There were two heats; the teams with the eight fastest times advanced to the final.

== Results ==
=== Heats ===
Competed from 10:29.

==== Heat 1 ====
| Rank | Lane | Nation | Swimmers | Time | Notes |
|---|---|---|---|---|---|
| 1 | 4 | Ukraine | Ievgen Poltavskyi; Andriy Kalyna; Andriy Sirovatchenko; Taras Yastremskyy | 4:26.59 | Q |
| 2 | 6 | China | Wang Renjie; Tian Hengheng; Wang Jiachao; Xiong Xiaoming | 4:32.59 | Q |
| 3 | 5 | Spain | Jesus Collado; Alejandro Sanchez; David Julian Levecq; Daniel Vidal | 4:33.73 | Q |
| 4 | 3 | Brazil | Daniel Dias; André Brasil; Marcelo Collet; Phelipe Rodrigues | 4:41.04 | Q |

==== Heat 2 ====
| Rank | Lane | Nation | Swimmers | Time | Notes |
|---|---|---|---|---|---|
| 1 | 3 | United States | Jarrett Perry; Rudy Garcia-Tolson; Mark Barr; Michael Prout Jr | 4:32.41 | Q |
| 2 | 4 | Australia | Ricardo Moffatti; Daniel Bell; Sam Bramham; Matt Levy | 4:33.02 | Q |
| 3 | 2 | Russia | Konstantin Lisenkov; Denis Dorogaev; Mikhail Sidnin; Mikhail Boyarin | 4:33.11 | Q |
| 4 | 5 | Great Britain | Sean Fraser; Sam Hynd; Graham Edmunds; David Roberts | 4:34.17 | Q |
| 5 | 6 | Germany | Swen Michaelis; Christoph Weber; Roy Tobis; Nikolai Willig | 4:42.48 | |

=== Final ===
Competed at 20:21.

| Rank | Lane | Nation | Swimmers | Time | Notes |
|---|---|---|---|---|---|
| 1st place, gold medalist(s) | 6 | Australia | Matthew Cowdrey; Rick Pendleton; Peter Leek; Ben Austin | 4:11.90 | WR |
| 2nd place, silver medalist(s) | 3 | China | Guo Zhi; Lin Furong; Wei Yanpeng; Wang Xiaofu | 4:12.67 | |
| 3rd place, bronze medalist(s) | 4 | Ukraine | Ievgen Poltavskyi; Andriy Kalyna; Andriy Sirovatchenko; Taras Yastremskyy | 4:19.89 | |
| 4 | 7 | Spain | Jesus Collado; Javier Crespo; David Julian Levecq; Daniel Vidal | 4:21.81 | |
| 5 | 1 | Great Britain | Sean Fraser; Sam Hynd; Robert Welbourn; David Roberts | 4:28.45 | |
| 6 | 2 | Russia | Igor Plotnikov; Denis Dorogaev; Konstantin Lisenkov; Alexander Shchelochkov | 4:28.51 | |
| 7 | 5 | United States | Justin Zook; Jarrett Perry; Cody Bureau; Lantz Lamback | 4:29.38 | |
| 8 | 8 | Brazil | Daniel Dias; André Brasil; Marcelo Collet; Phelipe Rodrigues | 4:40.01 | |

Q = qualified for final. WR = World Record.
