= 2009 IPC Swimming European Championships – Women's 100 metre butterfly =

The women's 100 metre butterfly at the 2009 IPC Swimming European Championships was held at Laugardalslaug in Reykjavik from 18–24 October.

== Medalists ==
Event	Gold		Silver		Bronze	
S8	Heather Frederiksen; Great Britain	1:16.33	Anna Vengerovskaya; Russia	1:17.53	Emma Hollis; Great Britain	1:24.37
S9	Stephanie Millward; Great Britain	1:10.78	Sarai Gascon Moreno; Spain	1:10.8	Elizabeth Simpkin; United Kingdom	1:13.58
S10	Elodie Lorandi; France	1:10.89 ER	Eleni Papadopoulos; Great Britain	1:13.82	Anna Omielan; Poland	1:16.43

== See also ==
- List of IPC world records in swimming
