= 2009 IPC Swimming European Championships – Women's 150 metre individual medley =

The women's 150 metre individual medley at the 2009 IPC Swimming European Championships was held at Laugardalslaug in Reykjavik from 18–24 October.

== Medalists ==
Event	Gold		Silver		Bronze	
SM4	Karina Lauridsen (SM4); Denmark	2:50.26	Karolina Hamer (SM4); Poland	3:24.27	Jennie Ekstrom (SM3); Sweden	3:40.75

== See also ==
- List of IPC world records in swimming
