= 2009 IPC Swimming European Championships – Women's 50 metre backstroke =

The women's 50 metre backstroke at the 2009 IPC Swimming European Championships was held at Laugardalslaug in Reykjavik from 18 to 24 October.

== Medalists ==
Event	Gold		Silver		Bronze	
S2	Ganna Ielisavetska (S1); Ukraine	1:10.97 WR	Iryna Sotska (S1); Ukraine	1:16.77	Nataliia Semenovav (S2); Ukraine	1:21.45
S3	Annke Conradi; Germany	1:13.49	Amaia Zuazua del Esta; Spain	1:17.91	Semicha Rizaoglou; Greece	1:18.25
S4	Natalia Popova; Russia	1:03.28	Karolina Hamer; Poland	1:05.61	Jennie Ekstrom; Sweden	1:06.06
S5	Běla Hlaváčková; Czech Republic	43.56	Karina Lauridsen; Denmark	45.88	Lisette Teunissen; Netherlands	50.29

== See also ==
- List of IPC world records in swimming
