= 2009 IPC Swimming European Championships – Men's 100 metre freestyle =

The men's 100 metre freestyle at the 2009 IPC Swimming European Championships was held at Laugardalslaug in Reykjavik from 18–24 October.

== Medalists ==
Event	Gold		Silver		Bronze	
S2	Dmitrii Kokarev; Russia	2:26.00	Jacek Czech; Poland	2:27.84	Georgios Kapellakis; Greece	2:30.31
S4	David Smetanine; France	1:24.20	Richard Oribe; Spain	1:24.28	Jan Povysil; Czech Republic	1:26.70
S5	Sebastian Rodriguez Veloso; Spain	1:13.30	Anthony Stephens; Great Britain	1:16.04	Hayri Simsek; France	1:19.98
S6	Anders Olsson; Sweden	1:05.45 WR	Darragh McDonald; Ireland	1:10.50	Swen Michaelis; Germany	1:11.09
S7	Matthew Walker; Great Britain	1:03.38	Jonathan Fox; Great Britain	1:04.11	Oleksandr Komarov; Ukraine	1:05.87
S8	Konstantin Lisenkov; Russia	58.66 ER	Maurice Deelen; Netherlands	58.89	Ferenc Nandor Csuri; Hungary	1:00.34
S9	Tamás Sors; Hungary	56.95	Jose Antonio Alcaraz-Garcia; Spain	57.54	David Grachat; Portugal	57.66
S10	David Levecq Vives; Spain; Lucas Ludwig; Germany	54.44	—N/a		Robert Welbourn; Great Britain	54.91
S11	Grzegorz Edward Polowski; Poland	1:02.38	Damian Pietrasik; Poland; Viktor Smyrnov; Ukraine	1:02.43	—N/a	
S12	Maksym Veraksa; Ukraine	50.91 WR	Aleksandr Nevolin-Svetov; Russia	54.48	Omar Font Jimenez; Spain	55.70
S13	Oleksii Fedyna; Ukraine	53.86	Dzmitry Salei; Belarus	54.03	Dmytro Aleksyeyev; Ukraine	54.89
S14	Daniel Pepper; Great Britain	55.99	Ben Procter; Great Britain	56.17	Marc Evers; Netherlands	57.78

== See also ==
- List of IPC world records in swimming
