= 2009 IPC Swimming European Championships – Women's 4 × 50 metre medley relay =

The women's 4 x 50 metre medley relay at the 2009 IPC Swimming European Championships was held at Laugardalslaug in Reykjavik from 18 to 24 October.

== Medalists ==
Event	Gold		Silver		Bronze	
20pts	Ganna Ielisavetska (S1); Oksana Khrul (SB6); Nataliia Shestopal (S6); Nataliia Prologaieva (S5); Ukraine	3:28.97	Diana Zambo (S5); Gitta Raczko (SB5); Reka Kezdi (S5); Katalin Engelhardt (S5); Hungary	3:33.42	Sara Carracelas Garcia (S2); Julia Castello Farre (SB5); Marta Exposito Garcia (S6); Dacil Cabrera Flores (S7); Spain	3:57.83

== See also ==
- List of IPC world records in swimming
