= 2009 IPC Swimming European Championships – Women's 4 × 100 metre freestyle relay =

The women's 4 x 100 metre freestyle relay at the 2009 IPC Swimming European Championships was held at Laugardalslaug in Reykjavik from 18–24 October.

== Medalists ==
Event	Gold		Silver		Bronze	
34pts	Stephanie Millward (S9); Ellie Simmonds (S6); Lauren Steadman (S6); Louise Watkin (S9); Great Britain	4:33.45 ER	Olesya Vladykina; Marina Gertel (S7); Nina Ryabova (S10); Irina Grazhdanova (S9); Russia	4:52.18	Verena Schott (S7); Jennifer Assmann (S9); Julia Kabus (S8); Kirsten Bruhn (S7); Germany	4:56.78

== See also ==
- List of IPC world records in swimming
