= 2009 IPC Swimming European Championships – Men's 4 × 50 metre freestyle relay =

The men's 4 x 50 metre freestyle relay at the 2009 IPC Swimming European Championships was held at Laugardalslaug in Reykjavik from 18–24 October.

== Medalists ==
Event	Gold		Silver		Bronze	
20pts	Richard Oribe (S4); Jordi Gordillo (S5); Sebastian Rodriguez Veloso (S5); Daniel Vidal (S6); Spain	2:21.55	Ioannis Kostakis (S3); Stylianos Tsakonas (S4); Christakis Panagiotis (S6); Nikolaos Tsotras (S7); Greece	2:39.11	Andrey Meshcheryakov (S3); Artem Zakharov (S6); Ivan Khmelnitskiy (S4); Igor Lukin (S7); Russia	2:46.82

== See also ==
- List of IPC world records in swimming
