= 2009 IPC Swimming European Championships – Men's 50 metre butterfly =

The men's 50 metre butterfly at the 2009 IPC Swimming European Championships was held at Laugardalslaug in Reykjavik from 18–24 October.

== Medalists ==
Event	Gold		Silver		Bronze	
S4	Arnost Petracek (S4); Czech Republic	44.78 WR	Dmytro Vynohradets (S3); Ukraine	57.81 WR	Kestutis Skucas (S4); Lithuania	1:00.20
S5	Anthony Stephens; Great Britain	42.15	Ricardo Ten Argiles; Spain	42.79	Xavier Torres Ramis; Spain	47.04
S6	Sascha Kindred; Great Britain	32.38 ER	Daniel Vidal; Spain	34.14	Igor Plotnikov; Russia	34.48
S7	Matt Walker; Great Britain	32.79	Oleksandr Komarov; Ukraine	33.68	Ruslan Sadvakasov; Russia	34.01

== See also ==
- List of IPC world records in swimming
