= Swimming at the 2008 Summer Paralympics – Women's 50 metre backstroke S5 =

Women's 50m Backstroke S5 at the XIII Paralympic Games
- Venue: Beijing National Aquatics Center
- Dates: 8 September
- Competitors: 14 from 12 nations
- Winning time: 41.03

Medalists
1st place, gold medalist(s)		Běla Hlaváčková	Czech Republic
2nd place, silver medalist(s)		Maria Teresa Perales	Spain
3rd place, bronze medalist(s)		Karina Lauridsen	Denmark

The women's 50m backstroke S5 event at the 2008 Summer Paralympics took place at the Beijing National Aquatics Center on 8 September. There were two heats; the swimmers with the eight fastest times advanced to the final.

== Results ==
=== Heats ===
Competed from 10:13.

==== Heat 1 ====
Rank	Name	Nationality	Time	Notes
1	Karina Lauridsen	Denmark	45.12	Q
2	Diána Zámbó	Hungary	51.19	Q
3	Lisette Teunissen	Netherlands	51.49	Q
4	Beth Nothling	South Africa	55.88	Q
5	Nadia Porras	Mexico	56.42	
6	Sonja Sigurdardottir	Iceland	57.90	
7	Simone Fragoso	Portugal	58.90	

==== Heat 2 ====
Rank	Name	Nationality	Time	Notes
1	Běla Hlaváčková	Czech Republic	41.17	Q, PR
2	Maria Teresa Perales	Spain	44.92	Q
3	Mayumi Narita	Japan	51.85	Q
4	Yuka Kawamura	Japan	55.01	Q
5	Genevieve Pairoux-Lagardere	France	1:02.65	
6	Diana Guimarães	Portugal	1:06.57	
	Marin Morrison	United States		DQ

=== Final ===
Competed at 19:02.

Rank	Name	Nationality	Time	Notes
1st place, gold medalist(s)	Běla Hlaváčková	Czech Republic	41.03	PR
2nd place, silver medalist(s)	Maria Teresa Perales	Spain	44.58	
3rd place, bronze medalist(s)	Karina Lauridsen	Denmark	45.72	
4	Lisette Teunissen	Netherlands	50.87	
5	Mayumi Narita	Japan	51.23	
6	Diána Zámbó	Hungary	52.04	
7	Beth Nothling	South Africa	54.29	
8	Yuka Kawamura	Japan	55.41	

Q = qualified for final. PR = Paralympic Record. DQ = Disqualified.
