= 2009 IPC Swimming European Championships – Men's 50 metre breaststroke =

The men's 50 metre breaststroke at the 2009 IPC Swimming European Championships was held at Laugardalslaug in Reykjavik from 18–24 October.

== Medalists ==
Event	Gold		Silver		Bronze	
SB3	Miguel Luque Avila; Spain	51.60	Vasileios Tsagkaris; Greece	53.48	Nicolo Bensi; Italy	54.16

== See also ==
- List of IPC world records in swimming
