= 2009 IPC Swimming European Championships – Women's 400 metre freestyle =

The women's 400 metre freestyle at the 2009 IPC Swimming European Championships was held at Laugardalslaug in Reykjavik from 18–24 October.

== Medalists ==
Event	Gold		Silver		Bronze	
S6	Ellie Simmonds; Great Britain	5:37.31	Natalie Jones; Great Britain	5:54.77	Sarah Louise Rung; Norway	5:55.53
S7	Kirsten Bruhn; Germany	5:24.91 ER	Verena Schott; Germany	5:37.38	Oxana Guseva; Russia	5:50.19
S8	Heather Frederiksen; Great Britain	4:49.79	Julia Kabus; Germany	5:34.56	Lisa den Braber; Netherlands	5:49.17
S9	Stephanie Millward; Great Britain	4:43.08 ER	Louise Watkin; Great Britain	4:46.41	Lauren Steadman; Great Britain	4:56.61
S10	Katarzyna Pawlik; Poland	4:51.96	Anna Omielan; Poland	4:59.80	Emma Cattle; Great Britain	5:05.06
S13	Anna Efimenko (S12); Russia	4:45.77	Naomi Maike Schnittger (S12); Germany	4:50.27	Yuliya Volkova (S12); Ukraine	4:50.98

== See also ==
- List of IPC world records in swimming
