= 2009 IPC Swimming European Championships – Women's 200 metre individual medley =

The women's 200 metre individual medley at the 2009 IPC Swimming European Championships was held at Laugardalslaug in Reykjavik from 18 to 24 October.

== Medalists ==
Event	Gold		Silver		Bronze	
SM6	Ellie Simmonds; Great Britain	3:11.82 WR	Natalie Jones; Great Britain	3:12.09	Verena Schott; Germany	3:16.59
SM7	Lalita Loureiro; Sweden	3:28.40	Oxana Guseva; Russia	3:30.81	Margita Prokeinova; Slovakia	3:33.42
SM8	Olesya Vladykina; Russia	2:41.45 WR	Heather Frederiksen; Great Britain	2:48.07	Emma Hollis; Great Britain	3:06.72
SM9	Louise Watkin; Great Britain	2:38.52	Paulina Wozniak; Poland	2:40.85	Emilie Gral; France	2:41.27
SM10	Elodie Lorandi; France	2:42.19	Eleni Papadopoulos; Great Britain	2:43.57	Nina Ryabova; Russia	2:44.18
SM13	Joanna Mendak (SM12); Poland	2:32.46	Oxana Savchenko (SM12); Russia	2:36.68	Yuliya Volkova (SM12); Ukraine	2:39.55
SM14	Magda Toeters; Netherlands	2:34.20	Natalie Massey; Great Britain	2:38.66	Leung Shu Hang; Hong Kong	2:42.01

== See also ==
- List of IPC world records in swimming
