= 2009 IPC Swimming European Championships – Women's 50 metre freestyle =

The women's 50 metre freestyle at the 2009 IPC Swimming European Championships was held at Laugardalslaug in Reykjavik from 18–24 October.

== Medalists ==
Event	Gold		Silver		Bronze	
S2	Ganna Ielisavetska (S1); Ukraine	1:11.73 WR	Nataliia Semenovav (S2); Ukraine	1:19.93	Iryna Sotska (S1); Ukraine	1:22.11
S4	Jennie Ekstrom (S4); Sweden	53.64	Karolina Hamer (S4); Poland	56.34	Annke Conradi (S3); Germany	1:04.50
S5	Nataliia Prologaieva; Ukraine	36.58	Běla Hlaváčková; Czech Republic	37.68	Lisette Teunissen; Netherlands	43.27
S6	Ellie Simmonds; Great Britain	36.85	Natalie Jones; Great Britain	37.64	Tanja Groepper; Germany	38.21
S7	Kirsten Bruhn; Germany	33.96	Verena Schott; Germany	34.35	Erel Halevi; Israel	37.18
S8	Heather Frederiksen; Great Britain	31.21 WR	Cecilie Drabsch Norland; Norway	32.18	Julia Kabus; Germany	34.34
S9	Louise Watkin; Great Britain	29.66	Sarai Gascon Moreno; Spain	29.69	Claire Cashmore; Great Britain	30.14
S10	Esther Morales Fernandez; Spain	29.36	Elodie Lorandi; France	29.73	Viera Mikulasikova; Slovakia	30.38
S11	Daniela Schulte; Germany	32.20	Cecilia Camellini; Italy	32.78	Chantal Cavin; Switzerland	32.94
S12	Anna Efimenko; Russia	28.13	Oxana Savchenko; Russia	28.21	Joanna Mendak; Poland	28.62
S13	Iryna Balashova; Ukraine	28.18	—N/a		—N/a	

== See also ==
- List of IPC world records in swimming
