= Graham Edmunds =

British swimmer (born 1974)

Personal information
- Full name: Graham Edmunds
- Nationality: British
- Born: 22 September 1974 (age 51) Reading

Sport
- Sport: Swimming
- Strokes: 50 Freestyle, 100 Freestyle 34 point Freestyle Relay
- Club: Swansea
Medal record
Men's swimming
Representing Great Britain
Paralympic Games
Gold medal – first place	2004 Athens	4×100 m freestyle – 34 pts
Gold medal – first place	2008 Beijing	4×100 m freestyle – 34 pts
IPC World Championships
Bronze medal – third place	2010 Eindhoven	4×100 m freestyle 34 pts
IPC European Championships
Gold medal – first place	2009 Reykjavik	4x100m freestyle relay 34pts
Bronze medal – third place	2009 Reykjavik	50 m freestyle – S10

Graham Edmunds (born 22 September 1974) is a British swimmer who has competed in three Paralympic Games, winning two gold medals in world record times. He was a member of the Reading Swimming Club where he was also a part-time lifeguard and coached the Cygnets, Reading's club for swimmers with learning difficulties.

== Accident ==
In October 2000, Edmunds was knocked off his motorcycle whilst riding to work on the A4. His injuries were so severe that doctors considered amputating both of his legs and believed that he would never walk again. He spent three months with his legs in casts before beginning swimming again as part of his physiotherapy routine. Because he had limited movement in his ankle joints, he qualified as a disabled swimmer in the S10 category. When Edmunds met the British Paralympic coach Billy Pye he decided to begin training for the 2004 Summer Paralympics, but had to move to Swansea to make use of the High-Performance Training Centre as Reading had no Olympic-size swimming pool.

== Paralympics ==
Edmunds made his first appearance at the Paralympics in 2004. He competed in two individual S10 classification freestyle events as well as the 4×100 m freestyle 34 pts relay team. In the individual 100 m he was knocked out in the heats but he made the final of the 50 m finishing in sixth. The relay team, which also featured David Roberts, Robert Welbourn and Matt Walker, set a new world record time of 3 59.62 seconds to win the gold medal ahead of Australia on the day of Edmunds 30th birthday.

In 2008 Edmunds won a silver medal and set a new British record in the S10 50 m freestyle at the British Swimming Championships. He made his second Paralympic appearance for Great Britain at the 2008 Summer Paralympics, held in Beijing, China. Edmunds raced in the same three events as in 2004 as well as the 4×100 m medley 34 pts relay team. he made the finals of both his individual events but failed to win a medal, finishing seventh in the 100 m and eighth in the 50 m. In the medley the Great Britain team made the final but finished fifth, 17 seconds behind the new world record time set by gold medallists Australia. The freestyle relay quartet of Edmunds, Roberts, Walker and Welbourn successfully defended the title they had won in Athens setting a new world record of 3 minutes 51.43 seconds en route to winning gold.

At the 2009 IPC Swimming European Championships in Reykjavík, Edmunds won an individual bronze medal in the men's S10 50 m freestyle and a gold medal in the 34 point 4x100 m freestyle competing with Walker, Welbourn and Jonathan Fox.

In 2010 Edmunds was appointed to UK Anti-Doping's newly formed Athlete's Committee along with fellow Paralympian Helene Raynsford.

In 2013 he was reappointed to the Athletes Committee of UK Anti-Doping for a further three years.

In May 2012 it was announced that Edmunds had been selected as part of the ParalympicGB to compete at London 2012. http://www.swimming.org/britishswimming/news/disability-swimming/paralympicsgb-nominees-confirmed-for-london-2012/13764/

== Post Swimming ==
Following on from the London 2012 Paralympic Games, Edmunds announced that he was retiring from competitive swimming.

In early 2013 Edmunds was appointed chairman of The Swimming Competitors Association, and therefore also appointed to the executive board of British Swimming as the Athletes Representative.
