= Swimming at the 2012 Summer Paralympics – Women's 100 metre freestyle S8 =

Women's 100 metre freestyle S8 at the XIV Paralympic Games
- Venue: London Aquatics Centre
- Dates: 6 September
- Competitors: 19 from 12 nations

Medalists
1st place, gold medalist(s)		Jessica Long	United States
2nd place, silver medalist(s)		Heather Frederiksen	Great Britain
3rd place, bronze medalist(s)		Maddison Elliott	Australia

The women's 100 metre freestyle S8 event at the 2012 Paralympic Games took place on 6 September, at the London Aquatics Centre.

Three heats were held, two with six swimmers each and one with seven competitors. The swimmers with the eight fastest times advanced to the final.

== Heats ==
=== Heat 1 ===
Rank	Lane	Name	Nationality	Time	Notes
1	4	Mallory Weggemann	United States	1:10.50	Q
2	3	Morgan Bird	Canada	1:11.16	Q
3	5	Jiang Shengnan	China	1:12.85	AS
4	2	Ksenia Sogomonyan	Russia	1:15.96	
5	7	Camille Bérubé	Canada	1:18.31	
6	6	Amanda Everlove	United States	1:19.38	

=== Heat 2 ===
Rank	Lane	Name	Nationality	Time	Notes
1	4	Heather Frederiksen	Great Britain	1:07.53	Q
2	5	Maddison Elliott	Australia	1:07.62	Q, OC
3	6	Kateryna Istomina	Ukraine	1:11.95	Q
4	3	Amalie Vinther	Denmark	1:12.25	Q
5	2	Mariann Vestbostad	Norway	1:16.17	
6	7	Immacolata Cerasuolo	Italy	1:17.71	

=== Heat 3 ===
Rank	Lane	Name	Nationality	Time	Notes
1	4	Jessica Long	United States	1:06.06	Q, WR
2	5	Olesya Vladykina	Russia	1:11.74	Q
3	2	Romy Pansters	Netherlands	1:14.55	
4	7	Julia Kabus	Germany	1:14.74	
5	6	Stefanie Weinberg	Germany	1:14.80	
6	3	Emma Hollis	Great Britain	1:23.35	
7	1	Sarah Mailhot	Canada	1:25.80	

== Final ==
Rank	Lane	Name	Nationality	Time	Notes
1st place, gold medalist(s)	4	Jessica Long	United States	1:05.63	WR
2nd place, silver medalist(s)	5	Heather Frederiksen	Great Britain	1:08.07	
3rd place, bronze medalist(s)	3	Maddison Elliott	Australia	1:08.37	
4	6	Mallory Weggemann	United States	1:08.51	
5	7	Olesya Vladykina	Russia	1:10.50	
6	2	Morgan Bird	Canada	1:10.97	
7	8	Amalie Vinther	Denmark	1:11.30	
8	1	Kateryna Istomina	Ukraine	1:12.43	
