= 2009 IPC Swimming European Championships – Men's 4 × 100 metre freestyle relay =

The men's 4 x 100 metre freestyle relay at the 2009 IPC Swimming European Championships was held at Laugardalslaug in Reykjavik from 18 to 24 October.

== Medalists ==
Event	Gold		Silver		Bronze	
34pts	Matthew Walker (S7); Graham Edmunds (S10); Jonathan Fox (S7); Robert Welbourn (S10); Great Britain	3:58.50	Jesus Collado (S9); Daniel Vidal (S6); Jose Antonio Alcaraz-Garcia (S9); David Levecq Vives (S10); Spain	4:00:00	Taras Yastremskyy (S9); Andriy Sirovatchenko (S9); Oleksandr Komarov (S7); Andriy Kalyna (S9); Ukraine	4:02.26

== See also ==
- List of IPC world records in swimming
