= 2009 IPC Swimming European Championships – Men's 200 metre freestyle =

The men's 200 metre freestyle at the 2009 IPC Swimming European Championships was held at Laugardalslaug in Reykjavik from 18–24 October.

== Medalists ==
Event	Gold		Silver		Bronze	
S2	Itzhak Mamistvalov (S1); Israel	5:06.67	Dmitrii Kokarev (S2); Russia	5:07.67	James Anderson (S2); Great Britain	5:10.49
S4	Richard Oribe; Spain	2:59.73	David Smetanine; France	3:05.44	Jan Povysil; Czech Republic	3:12.30
S5	Sebastian Rodriguez Veloso; Spain	2:42.11	Anthony Stephens; Great Britain	2:42.22	Hayri Simsek; France	3:02.67

== See also ==
- List of IPC world records in swimming
