= 2009 IPC Swimming European Championships – Women's 100 metre breaststroke =

The women's 100 metre breaststroke at the 2009 IPC Swimming European Championships was held at Laugardalslaug in Reykjavik from 18–24 October.

== Medalists ==
Event	Gold		Silver		Bronze	
SB4	Běla Hlaváčková; Czech Republic	1:57.82	Katalin Engelhardt; Hungary	2:11.98	Tanja Groepper; Germany	2:29.19
SB5	Kirsten Bruhn; Germany	1:35.12	Rachel Lardiere; France	1:53.23	Gitta Raczko; Hungary	1:58.26
SB6	Charlotte Henshaw; Great Britain	1:40.50	Elizabeth Johnson; Great Britain	1:41.36	Oksana Khrul; Ukraine	1:47.82
SB7	Lisa den Braber; Netherlands	1:34.57 ER	Emma Hollis; Great Britain	1:43.29	Annika Geller; Germany	1:56.06
SB8	Olesya Vladykina; Russia	1:17.60 WR	Paulina Woźniak; Poland	1:23.53	Claire Cashmore; Great Britain	1:23.61
SB9	Nina Ryabova; Russia	1:21.85 ER	Louise Watkin; Great Britain	1:22.12	Sarai Gascón Moreno; Spain	1:23.18
SB13	Carla Casals Sole (SB12); Spain	1:22.12	Yaryna Matlo (SB12); Ukraine	1:22.65	Yuliya Volkova (SB12); Ukraine	1:23.07
SB14	Magda Toeters; Netherlands	1:19.55	Leung Shu Hang; Hong Kong	1:27.13	Amberley Hoar; Great Britain	1:30.19

== See also ==
- List of IPC world records in swimming
