= 2009 IPC Swimming European Championships – Men's 4 × 50 metre medley relay =

The men's 4 x 50 metre medley relay at the 2009 IPC Swimming European Championships was held at Laugardalslaug in Reykjavik from 18–24 October.

== Medalists ==
Event	Gold		Silver		Bronze	
20pts	Xavier Torres Ramis (S5); Ricardo Ten Argiles (SB5); Daniel Vidal (S6); Sebastian Rodriguez Veloso (S5); Spain	2:40.10	James Anderson (S2); Matthew Whorwood (SB6); Sascha Kindred (S6); Anthony Stephens (S6); Great Britain	2:58.36	Stylianos Tsakonas (S4); Vasileios Tsagkaris (SB3); Christakis Panagiotis (S6); Charalampos Papaioannou (S7); Greece	2:58.96

== See also ==
- List of IPC world records in swimming
