= 2009 IPC Swimming European Championships – Women's 50 metre butterfly =

Swimming competition

The women's 50 metre butterfly at the 2009 IPC Swimming European Championships was held at Laugardalslaug in Reykjavik from 18–24 October.

== Medalists ==
Event	Gold		Silver		Bronze	
S5	Diana Zambo; Hungary	50.00	Katalin Engelhardt; Hungary	51.55	Simone da Silva; Portugal	58.24
S6	Inbal Schwartz; Israel	39.28 ER	Anastasia Diodorova; Russia	39.43	Natalia Shavel; Belarus	48.16
S7	Lalita Loureiro; Sweden	40.26	Verena Schott; Germany	40.88	Margita Prokeinova; Slovakia	41.64

== See also ==
- List of IPC world records in swimming
