= 2009 IPC Swimming European Championships – Women's 200 metre freestyle =

The women's 200 metre freestyle at the 2009 IPC Swimming European Championships was held at Laugardalslaug in Reykjavik from 18–24 October.

== Medalists ==
Event	Gold		Silver		Bronze	
S4	Jennie Ekstrom (S4); Sweden	4:08.09	Karolina Hamer (S4); Poland	4:09.35	Annke Conradi (S3); Germany	4:49.89
S5	Inbal Pezaro; Israel	2:53.07	Lisette Teunissen; Netherlands	3:28.14	Maria João Gonçalves; Portugal	3:37.28

== See also ==
- List of IPC world records in swimming
