= 2009 IPC Swimming European Championships – Women's 50 metre breaststroke =

The women's 50 metre breaststroke at the 2009 IPC Swimming European Championships was held at Laugardalslaug in Reykjavik from 18 to 24 October.

== Medalists ==
Event	Gold		Silver		Bronze	
SB3	Karina Lauridsen (SB3); Denmark	1:01.76	Natalia Popova (SB3); Russia	1:17.64	Jennie Ekstrom (SB2); Sweden	1:20.72

== See also ==
- List of IPC world records in swimming
