= 2009 IPC Swimming European Championships – Men's 150 metre individual medley =

Swimming event in Reykjavík, Iceland

The men's 150 metre individual medley at the 2009 IPC Swimming European Championships was held at Laugardalslaug in Reykjavik from 18–24 October.

== Medalists ==
Event	Gold		Silver		Bronze	
SM3	Dmytro Vynohradets; Ukraine	3:06.07 ER	Ioannis Kostakis; Greece	3:20.24	Frederic Bussi; France	3:26.66
SM4	Xavier Torres Ramis; Spain	2:43.13	Miguel Luque Avila; Spain	2:44.30	Filippo Bonacini; Italy	2:55.89

== See also ==
- List of IPC world records in swimming
