= Taras Yastremskyy =

Ukrainian Paralympic swimmer

Medal record

Men's swimming

Representing Ukraine

Paralympic Games
Bronze medal – third place	2008 Beijing	4x100 m medley 34pts

IPC European Championships
Gold medal – first place	2009 Reykjavik	4x100m m relay 34pts
Bronze medal – third place	2009 Reykjavik	4x100 m freestyle relay 34pts

Taras Yastremskyy (Ukrainian: Тарас Ястремський) is a paralympic swimmer from Ukraine competing mainly in category S9 events.

Taras has twice competed at the Paralympics for the Ukrainian team firstly in 2004 and then again in 2008. In both years he failed to make the final of the 50m freestyle and 400m freestyle. In the 2004 games he finished eighth in the 100m freestyle final, failed to make the final of the 200m individual medley and was part of the Ukrainian quartet that finished fifth in the heat of the 4 × 100 m freestyle and sixth in the final of the 4 × 100 m medley. In the 2008 games he failed to make the final of the 100m freestyle but did win a bronze medal in the 4 × 100 m medley with his Ukrainian teammates.
