= Mihovil Španja =

Croatian Paralympic swimmer

Personal information
- Born: 20 April 1984 (age 42) Dubrovnik, SR Croatia, SFR Yugoslavia

Sport
- Country: Croatia
- Sport: Swimming
- Coached by: Dean Kontić
Medal record
Representing Croatia
Swimming
Paralympic Games
Bronze medal – third place	2004 Athens	100 m backstroke S8
Bronze medal – third place	2004 Athens	200 m individual medley SM8
Bronze medal – third place	2004 Athens	400 m freestyle S8
Bronze medal – third place	2012 London	100 m backstroke S7
IPC World Championships - 25m
Gold medal – first place	2009 Rio de Janeiro	100 m backstroke S7
Gold medal – first place	2009 Rio de Janeiro	200 m individual medley SM7
Silver medal – second place	2009 Rio de Janeiro	100 m breaststroke SB6
Silver medal – second place	2009 Rio de Janeiro	200 m individual medley SM7
IPC European Championships
Gold medal – first place	2009 Reykjavik	100 m backstroke – SB6
Gold medal – first place	2009 Reykjavik	200 m individual medley SM7
Silver medal – second place	2009 Reykjavik	400 m freestyle – S7
Silver medal – second place	2009 Reykjavik	100 m backstroke – S7

Mihovil Španja (born 20 April 1984) is a retired Croatian Paralympic swimmer.

In 2021, the Croatian Olympic Committee named Španja the Croatian Paralympic Athlete of the Decade.
