= Ievgen Poltavskyi =

Ukrainian Paralympic swimmer

Medal record

Swimming

Representing Ukraine

Paralympic Games
| Bronze medal – third place | 2008 Beijing | 4x100 metre medley - 34 pts |

IPC European Championships
| Gold medal – first place | 2009 Reykjavik | 4x100m medley relay 34pts |

Ievgen Poltavskyi is a Paralympic swimmer from Ukraine competing mainly in category S8 events.

Ievgen was part of the Ukrainian team that travelled to the 2008 Summer Paralympics in Beijing. He finished last in his heat in the 100m freestyle, finished sixth in the 100m backstroke and won a bronze medal as part of the Ukrainian quartet in the 4 × 100 m medley.
