= Heather Frederiksen =

British Paralympic swimmer

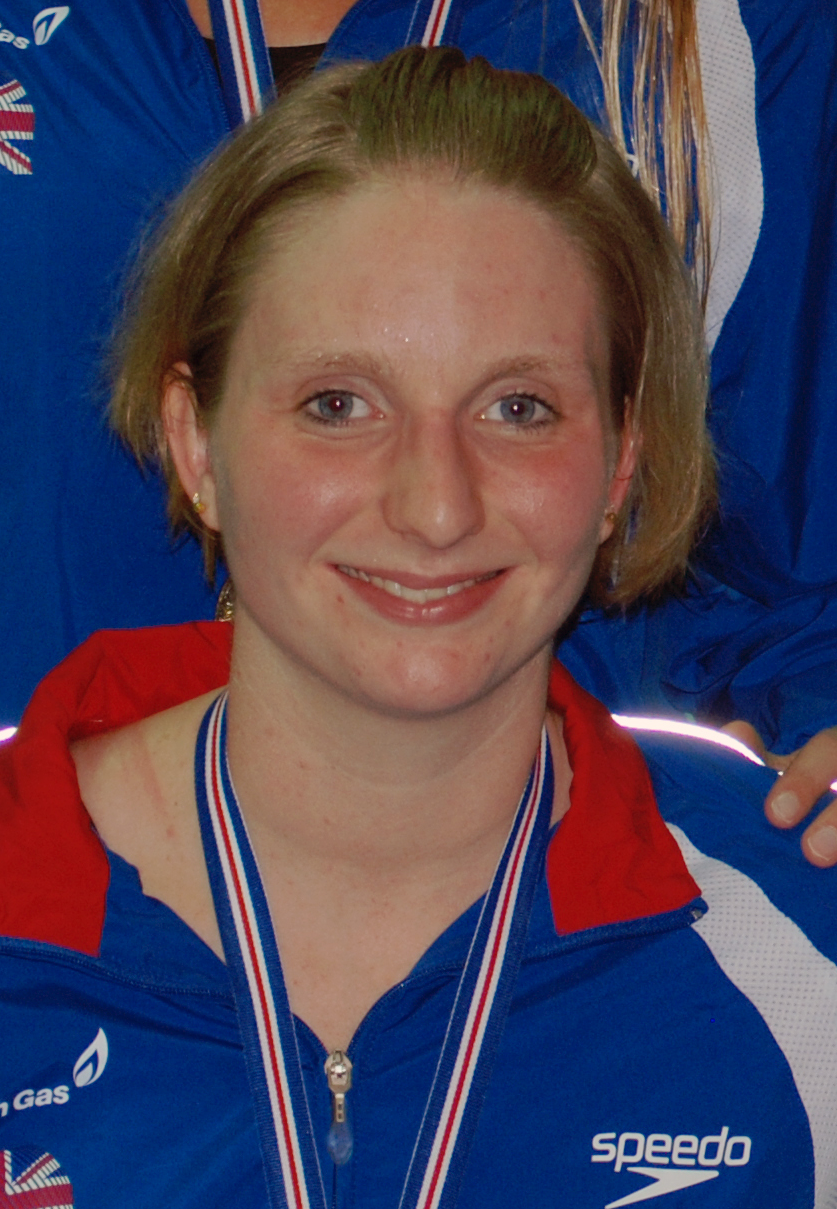
- Frederiksen at the 2009 IPC European Championships

Personal information
- Full name: Heather Frederiksen
- Nationality: British
- Born: 30 December 1985 (age 40) Leigh, Greater Manchester, England
- Height: 1.78 m (5 ft 10 in)
- Weight: 69 kg (152 lb; 10.9 st)

Sport
- Sport: Swimming
- Club: City of Manchester Aquatics Swim Team
Medal record
Representing Great Britain
Women's swimming
Paralympic Games
Gold medal – first place	2008 Beijing	100 m backstroke S8
Gold medal – first place	2012 London	100 m backstroke S8
Silver medal – second place	2008 Beijing	100 m freestyle S8
Silver medal – second place	2008 Beijing	400 m freestyle S8
Silver medal – second place	2012 London	400 m freestyle S8
Silver medal – second place	2012 London	100 m freestyle S8
Silver medal – second place	2012 London	4 × 100 m medley relay 34 pts
Bronze medal – third place	2008 Beijing	200 m ind. medley SM8
IPC European Championships
Gold medal – first place	2009 Reykjavik	50 m freestyle – S8
Gold medal – first place	2009 Reykjavik	100 m freestyle – S8
Gold medal – first place	2009 Reykjavik	400 m freestyle – S8
Gold medal – first place	2009 Reykjavik	100 m butterfly – S8
Gold medal – first place	2009 Reykjavik	4×100 m medley relay 34 pts
Silver medal – second place	2009 Reykjavik	200 m medley SM8
Bronze medal – third place	2009 Reykjavik	100 m backstroke – S9

Heather Frederiksen MBE (born 30 December 1985) is a retired British Paralympic swimmer. She is former world record holder in the women's S8 100 m backstroke, 50 m freestyle, 100 m freestyle, 200 m freestyle and 400 m freestyle events. As of June 2017, she still holds European records in the S8 200 m and 400 m freestyle. Frederiksen is a two time Paralympic champion in the 100m backstroke S8 classification, and has won eight Paralympic medals in all.

== Early life and education ==
Frederiksen was born in Leigh, England. She attended the Lowton Church of England High School for secondary school.

== Career ==
In 2004, prior to her accident, she won both the British 10 km Open Water Championship and 4.5 km British Grand Prix on the same day.

Following her accident, Frederiksen returned to competition in the S8 (backstroke and freestyle), SB7 (breaststroke) and SM8 (medley) classifications. Her first senior para-swimming meet came at the 2007 German Open, in Berlin.

In her first appearance at the British Championships in 2008 Frederiksen won two gold and two silver medals from her six events and set a number of national records. At the 2008 Summer Paralympics, in Beijing, she competed in five events and won four medals. Her first medal, a silver in the women's 100 m freestyle – S8 final on 8 September, was followed two days later by gold in the women's 100 m backstroke – S8 in a new IPC world record time of one minute 16.74 seconds. A bronze medal was won by Frederiksen in the 200 m individual medley and her final medal of the games came with a silver in the 400 m freestyle. In her final event, the 50 m freestyle, she reached the final but finished in 7th position. In all three races where Frederikson won silver or bronze medals it was American Jessica Long who won the gold medal.

An in-competition drug test at the 2009 IPC Swimming European Championships found high levels of salbutamol in Frederiksen's bloodstream. Frederiksen is asthmatic, and had used the medication to abort a severe asthma attack. She received a 6 months doping ban, backdated to the day of the drug test, and had to forfeit the two medals she won later in the competition.

The 2012 Summer Paralympics saw Frederiksen claim another gold medal in the 100 m backstroke S8, along with silver medals in both the 400 m freestyle S8 and 100 m freestyle S8.

In October 2012 Heather Frederiksen (and silver medallist Louise Watkin) left the city of Salford, according to BBC Sport, as a result of a breakdown in the relationship with coach John Stout.

She was appointed Member of the Order of the British Empire (MBE) in the 2013 New Year Honours for services to swimming.

Frederiksen retired from competitive swimming in 2013, after becoming pregnant with her first child.

== Injury ==
At the end of 2004, Frederiksen suffered a serious accident that left her with limited use of her right arm and leg, and the need to use a wheelchair. Her doctors told her she would never swim again, and when she tried she found herself swimming in circles.

It was in 2006, whilst watching television coverage of the swimming events at the Commonwealth Games, in Melbourne, that Frederiksen decided she wanted to swim again. After her Paralympic success she said of the experience, "I saw Joanne Jackson win the gold in the 400 m and I just said to myself, 'I'm not ready to finish. I'll finish when I want to finish, not when someone else tells me to'"—she had previously competed against Jackson.

== See also ==
- List of IPC world records in swimming
- List of Paralympic records in swimming
- Great Britain at the 2008 Summer Paralympics
- Swimming at the 2008 Summer Paralympics
- 2012 Olympics gold post boxes in the United Kingdom
