= 2009 IPC Swimming European Championships – Men's 50 metre freestyle =

The men's 50 metre freestyle at the 2009 IPC Swimming European Championships was held at Laugardalslaug in Reykjavik from 18 to 24 October.

== Medalists ==
Event	Gold		Silver		Bronze	
S1	Itzhak Mamistvalov; Israel	1:09.72	Christos Tampaxis; Greece	1:22.87	Alexandros Taxildaris; Greece	1:45.97
S2	James Anderson; Great Britain	1:09.24	Jacek Czech; Poland	1:09.59	Dmitrii Kokarev; Russia	1:09.61
S3	Dmytro Vynohradets; Ukraine	44.21	Ioannis Kostakis; Greece	48.49	Miguel Ángel Martínez; Spain	53.08
S4	David Smetanine; France	37.99	Richard Oribe; Spain	38.81	Jan Povysil; Czech Republic	39,94
S5	Sebastian Rodriguez Veloso; Spain	33.88	Anthony Stephens; Great Britain	34.87	Hayri Simsek; France	35.61
S6	Anders Olsson; Sweden	31.54	Daniel Vidal; Spain	32.13	Christakis Panagiotis; Greece	33.15
S7	Matthew Walker; Great Britain	28.31	Jonathan Fox; Great Britain	29.73	Nikolaos Tsotras; Greece	31.25
S8	Maurice Deelen; Netherlands	26.82 ER	Konstantin Lisenkov; Russia	27.04	Sean Fraser; Great Britain	27.98
S9	Tamás Sors; Hungary	26.09 ER	Jose Antonio Alcaraz-Garcia; Spain	26.38	Sami el Gueddari; France	26.54
S10	David Levecq Vives; Spain	24.74 ER	Lucas Ludwig; Germany	25.18	Graham Edmunds; Great Britain	25.36
S11	Damian Pietrasik; Poland	27.15	Rustam Nurmuchametov; Russia	27.33	Grzegorz Polkowski; Poland	27.68
S12	Maksym Veraksa; Ukraine	22.99 WR	Aleksandr Nevolin-Svetov; Russia	24.48	Omar Font Jimenez; Spain	25.07
S13	Oleksii Fedyna; Ukraine	24.13	Dmytro Aleksyeyev; Ukraine	24.66	Daniel Simon; Germany	25.67

== See also ==
- List of IPC world records in swimming
