= 2009 IPC Swimming European Championships – Men's 100 metre backstroke =

Kamal meena

The men's 100 metre backstroke at the 2009 IPC Swimming European Championships was held at Laugardalslaug in Reykjavik from 18–24 October.

== Medalists ==
Event	Gold		Silver		Bronze	
S6	Yevheniy Bohodayko; Ukraine	1:17.67	Igor Plotnikov; Russia	1:17.98	Swen Michaelis; Germany	1:21.66
S7	Jonathan Fox; Great Britain	1:12.48 ER	Mihovil Spanja; Croatia	1:14.10	Dino Sinovcic; Croatia	1:17.80
S8	Konstantin Lisenkov; Russia	1:07.10	Thomas Young; Great Britain	1:08.48	Sean Fraser; Great Britain	1:09.52
S9	Tamás Sors; Hungary	1:05.48	Jesus Collado; Spain	1:05.94	David Hill; Great Britain	1:06.12
S10	Kardo Ploomipuu; Estonia	1:01.03 WR	Lucas Ludwig; Germany	1:02.57	Maksym Isayev; Ukraine	1:04.79
S11	Viktor Smyrnov; Ukraine	1:09.67	Damian Pietrasik; Poland	1:11.73	Dmytro Zalevskyy; Ukraine	1:13.93
S12	Maksym Veraksa; Ukraine	1:00.72	Aleksandr Nevolin-Svetov; Russia	1:02.33	Albert Gelis; Spain	1:03.33
S13	Oleksii Fedyna; Ukraine	1:02.82	Dmytro Aleksyeyev; Ukraine	1:03.87	Danylo Chufarov; Ukraine	1:04.82
S14	Craig Rodgie; Great Britain	1:06.98	Ben Procter; Great Britain	1:07.49	Wessel Everloo; Netherlands	1:12.05

== See also ==
- List of IPC world records in swimming
