= 2009 IPC Swimming European Championships – Men's 100 metre butterfly =

The men's 100 metre butterfly at the 2009 IPC Swimming European Championships was held at Laugardalslaug in Reykjavik from 18–24 October.

== Medalists ==
Event	Gold		Silver		Bronze	
S8	Charles Rozoy; France	1:03.27 ER	Richard Howard; Great Britain	1:03.73	Ferenc Nandor Csuri; Hungary	1:04.89
S9	Tamás Sors; Hungary	1:00.20	Kristijan Vincetic; Croatia	1:00.45	Federico Morlacchi; Italy	1:01.57
S10	David Levecq Vives; Spain	58.13	Mike van der Zanden; Netherlands	58.46	Lucas Ludwig; Germany	1:00.03
S11	Viktor Smyrnov; Ukraine	1:04.23	Stephan Engelhardt; Germany	1:09.45	Eduardo Cruz Gomez; Germany	1:12.90
S12	Anton Stabrovskyy; Ukraine	58.92	Sergey Punko; Russia	59.23	Albert Gelis; Spain	1:00.46
S13	Danylo Chufarov; Ukraine	59.30	Dzmitry Salei; Belarus	59.82	Daniel Simon; Germany	1:00.66

== See also ==
- List of IPC world records in swimming
