= Miguel Luque Ávila =

Spanish Paralympic swimmer

Miguel Luque
Personal information
- Full name: Miguel Luque Ávila
- Nationality: Spain
- Born: 21 September 1976 (age 49) Granollers, Barcelona, Spain

Sport
- Sport: Swimming
Medal record
Men's swimming
Representing Spain
Paralympic Games
Gold medal – first place	2000 Sydney	50 m breaststroke (SB3)
Gold medal – first place	2004 Athens	50 m breaststroke (SB3)
Silver medal – second place	2012 London	50 m breaststroke (SB3)
Silver medal – second place	2016 Rio de Janeiro	50 m breaststroke (SB3)
Silver medal – second place	2020 Tokyo	50 m breaststroke (SB3)
Bronze medal – third place	2004 Athens	4x50 m medley relay 20pts
Bronze medal – third place	2008 Beijing	50 m breaststroke (SB3)
Bronze medal – third place	2024 Paris	50 m breaststroke (SB3)
World Championships
Gold medal – first place	2002 Mar del Plata	50 m breaststroke (SB3)
Gold medal – first place	2006 Durban	50 m breaststroke (SB3)
Gold medal – first place	2010 Eindhoven	50 m breaststroke (SB3)
Gold medal – first place	2015 Glasgow	50 m backstroke (SB3)
Silver medal – second place	2013 Montreal	50 m backstroke (SB3)
Silver medal – second place	2022 Madeira	50 m breaststroke (SB3)
Silver medal – second place	2023 Manchester	50 m breaststroke (SB3)
Bronze medal – third place	2006 Durban	150 m medley (SM3)
Bronze medal – third place	2022 Madeira	150 m ind. medley (SM4)
Bronze medal – third place	2022 Madeira	4x50m mixed medley relay 20pts
European Championships
Gold medal – first place	2009 Reykjavik	100m breaststroke (SB3)
Silver medal – second place	2009 Reykjavik	150 m ind. medley (SM4)
Silver medal – second place	2016 Funchal	50 m breaststroke – SB3
Bronze medal – third place	2016 Funchal	Mixed 50m medley relay 20pts

Miguel Luque Ávila (born 21 September 1976 in Granollers, Barcelona) is a Spanish swimmer.

== Personal ==
Luque was born on September 21, 1976, in Granollers, Barcelona. He has a physical disability. In 2013, he was awarded the silver Real Orden al Mérito Deportivo.

== Swimming ==
Luque is an S5 type swimmer. One of the reasons he competes in swimming is for the therapeutic benefits. He is affiliated with the Spanish Federation of Sports for the Physically Disabled (FEDDF).

Luque raced at the 2000 Summer Paralympics, earning a gold medal in the SB3 50 meter breaststroke. He raced at the 2004 Summer Paralympics, and finished first in the SB3 50 meter breaststroke. He finished third in the 4 x 50 meter men's 20 point medley relay. In 2007, he competed at the IDM German Open. He raced at the 2008 Summer Paralympics, winning a bronze in the SB3 50 meter breaststroke. In 2010, he competed at the Tenerife International Open. He competed at the 2010 Adapted Swimming World Championship in the Netherlands. In advance of the competition, he attended a swimming camp with the national team that was part of the Paralympic High Performance Program (HARP Program). He competed at the 2011 IPC European Swimming Championships in Berlin, Germany where he finished eighth in the 50 meter butterfly. He finished first in the 50 meter breaststroke.

In 2012, Luque competed at the Paralympic Swimming Championship of Spain by Autonomous Communities, finishing second in the 150 meter freestyle race. From the Catalan region of Spain, he was a recipient of a 2012 Plan ADO scholarship. He competed at the 2012 Summer Paralympics, earning a silver in the SB3 50 meter breaststroke. After winning the medal, he was not sure if he planned to train for the 2016 Summer Paralympics. One of the reasons he cited was the competitive level following each Games increased and required greater levels of training in order to stay at the highest level. He competed at the 2013 IPC Swimming World Championships. He was one of fourteen swimmers from the CED San Rafael swimming club to participate in a competition at South Park Rivas Vaciamadrid in December 2013.
