= 2009 IPC Swimming European Championships – Women's 4 × 100 metre medley relay =

The women's 4 x 100 metre medley relay at the 2009 IPC Swimming European Championships was held at Laugardalslaug in Reykjavik from 18–24 October.

== Medalists ==
Event	Gold		Silver		Bronze	
34pts	Heather Frederiksen; Claire Cashmore; Stephanie Millward; Louise Watkin; Great Britain	4:54.47 WR	Nina Ryabova; Olesya Vladykina; Irina Grazhdanova; Oxana Guseva; Russia	5:09.50	Julia Castello Farre; Ana Rubio Zavala; Sarai Gascon Moreno; Esther Morales Fernandez; Spain	5:15.26

== See also ==
- List of IPC world records in swimming
