= 2009 IPC Swimming European Championships – Men's 400 metre freestyle =

The men's 400 metre freestyle at the 2009 IPC Swimming European Championships was held at Laugardalslaug in Reykjavik from 18–24 October.

== Medalists ==
Event	Gold		Silver		Bronze	
S6	Anders Olsson; Sweden	4:47.75 WR	Darragh McDonald; Ireland	5:15.07	Matthew Worwood; Great Britain	5:16.67
S7	Jonathan Fox; Great Britain	4:56.18	Mihovil Spanja; Croatia	4:56.54	Guillaume Launay; France	5:17.41
S8	Sam Hynd; Great Britain	4:27.69	Christoph Burkard; Germany	4:38.43	Sean Fraser; Great Britain	4:46.67
S9	Kristijan Vincetic; Croatia	4:23.06	David Grachat; Portugal	4:24.63	Kacper Rodziewicz; Poland	4:25.37
S10	Robert Welbourn; Great Britain	4:09.15	Lucas Ludwig; Germany	4:15.70	Maksym Isayev; Ukraine	4:18.35
S11	Oleksandr Myroshnychenko; Ukraine	4:58.17	Eythor Thrastarson; Iceland	5:11.54	Eduardo Cruz Gomez; Spain	5:13.26
S12	Sergey Punko; Russia	4:15.09	Enrique Floriano; Spain	4:24.07	Anton Stabrovskyy; Ukraine	4:35.10
S13	Danylo Chufarov; Ukraine	4:20.69	Kevin Mendez Martinez; Spain	4:31.08	Oleg Tkalienko; Ukraine	5:01.23

== See also ==
- List of IPC world records in swimming
