= 2009 IPC Swimming European Championships – Men's 50 metre backstroke =

The men's 50 metre backstroke at the 2009 IPC Swimming European Championships was held at Laugardalslaug in Reykjavik from 18–24 October.

== Medalists ==
Event	Gold		Silver		Bronze	
S1	Christos Tampaxis; Greece	1:24.73	Joao Martins; Portugal	1:41.49	Alexandros Taxildaris; Greece	1:49.45
S2	Georgios Kapellakis; Greece	1:08.71	James Anderson; Great Britain	1:10.34	Aristeidis Makrodimitris; Greece	1:12.03
S3	Dmytro Vynohradets; Ukraine	50.54 ER	Miguel Angel Martinez; Spain	52.56	Mikael Fredriksson; Sweden	1:03.59
S4	David Smetanine; France	48.53	Arnost Petracek; Czech Republic	49.76	Stylianos Tsakonas; Greece	52.78
S5	Anthony Stephens; Great Britain	41.20	Zsolt Vereczkei; Hungary	41.40	Ricardo Ten Argiles; Spain	43.76

== See also ==
- List of IPC world records in swimming
