= Vicente Javier Torres Ramis =

Spanish Paralympic swimmer

Xavi Torres
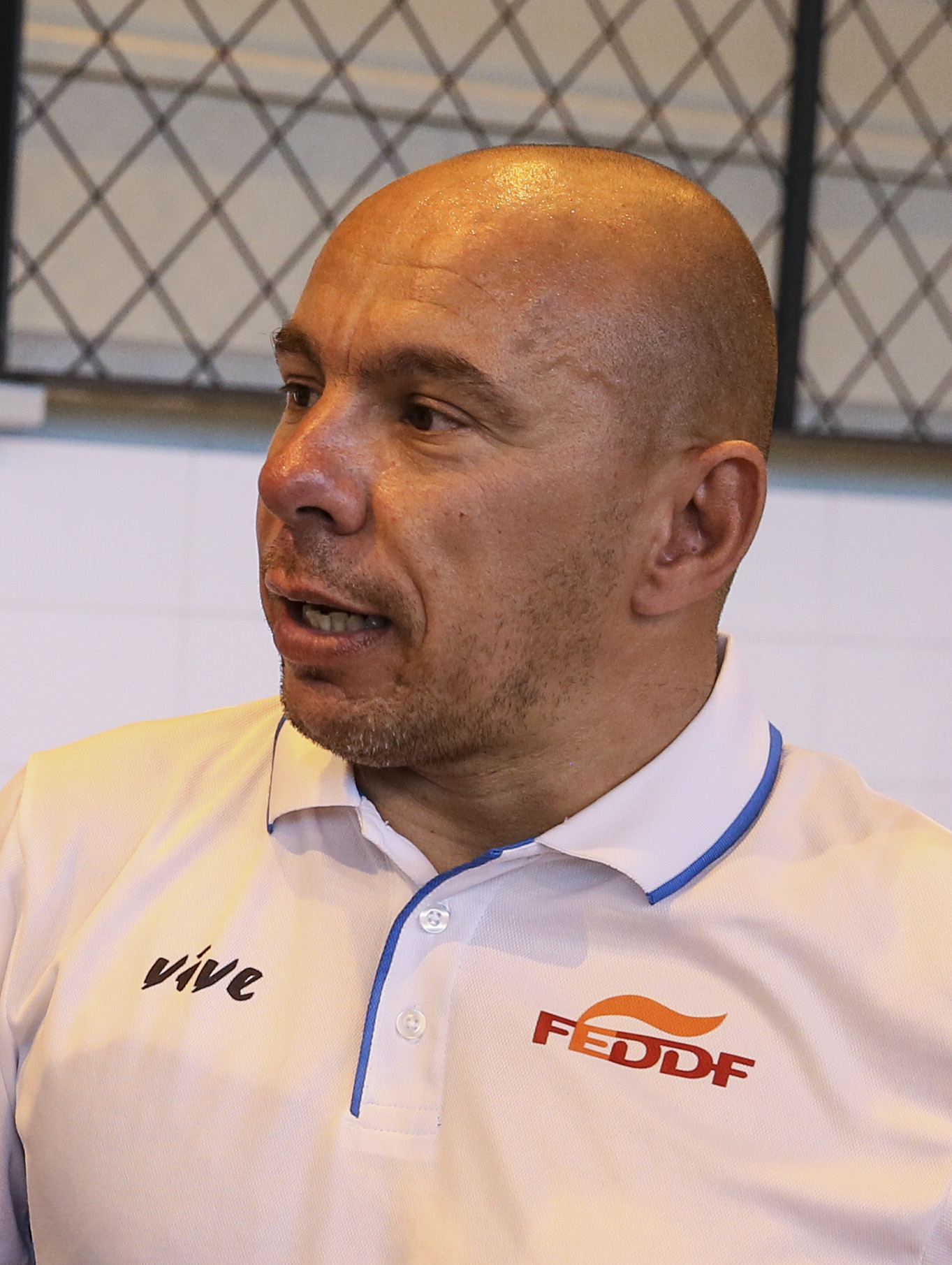

Personal information
- Full name: Vicente Javier Torres Ramis
- Nickname: Xavi
- Nationality: Spanish
- Born: 14 June 1974 (age 52) Palma de Mallorca, Balearic Islands

Sport
- Country: Spain
- Sport: Swimming (S5)
Medal record
Swimming
Representing Spain
Paralympic Games
Gold medal – first place	1992 Barcelona	4x50m freestyle relay S1-6
Gold medal – first place	1996 Atlanta	150m individual medley SM4
Gold medal – first place	2000 Sydney	150m individual medley SM4
Gold medal – first place	2000 Sydney	4x50m freestyle relay 20pts
Gold medal – first place	2000 Sydney	4x50m medley relay 20pts
Silver medal – second place	1992 Barcelona	150m individual medley SM4
Silver medal – second place	1992 Barcelona	4x50m medley relay S1-6
Silver medal – second place	1996 Atlanta	4x50m freestyle relay S1-6
Silver medal – second place	2004 Athens	150m individual medley SM4
Silver medal – second place	2008 Beijing	150m individual medley SM4
Bronze medal – third place	1992 Barcelona	50m butterfly S5
Bronze medal – third place	1992 Barcelona	100m breaststroke SB3
Bronze medal – third place	1996 Atlanta	4x50m medley relay S1-6
Bronze medal – third place	2000 Sydney	50m breaststroke SB3
Bronze medal – third place	2004 Athens	4x50m medley relay 20pts
Bronze medal – third place	2008 Beijing	4x50m medley relay 20pts
World Championships
Gold medal – first place	1994 Malta	50m breaststroke SB3
Gold medal – first place	1994 Malta	150m individual medley SM3-4
Gold medal – first place	1998 Christchurch	150m individual medley SM4
Gold medal – first place	1998 Christchurch	4x50m freestyle relay open
Gold medal – first place	2002 Mar del Plata	150m individual medley SM4
Silver medal – second place	1998 Christchurch	50m breaststroke SB3
Silver medal – second place	1998 Christchurch	50m butterfly S5
Silver medal – second place	2006 Durban	150m individual medley SM4
Silver medal – second place	2006 Durban	4x50m medley relay 20pts
Bronze medal – third place	1994 Malta	50m butterfly S5
Bronze medal – third place	1998 Christchurch	4x50m medley relay open
European Championships
Gold medal – first place	2009 Reykjavik	150 m individual medley SM4
Gold medal – first place	2009 Reykjavik	4x50m medley relay 20pts
Bronze medal – third place	2009 Reykjavik	50 m butterfly S5

Vicente Javier "Xavi" Torres Ramis (born 14 June 1974 in Palma de Mallorca, Balearic Islands) is an S5 swimmer from Spain.

== Personal ==
Torres was born on 14 June 1974 in Palma de Mallorca, Balearic Islands. In May 2012, he was a presenter at the International Film Festival Maremostra Ocea. In November 2013, he participated in a program run by the Programa ADOP Empleo to train Paralympic athletes in developing business communication and entrepreneurship skills.

== Swimming ==
Torres is an S5/SM4 swimmer from Spain. He has held four world records in his classification.

In 2010, Torres competed at the Tenerife International Open. Before the 2010 IPC Swimming World Championship in the Netherlands, he went to a swimming camp with the national team that was part of the Paralympic High Performance Program (HARP Program). Eindhoven, Netherlands hosted the 2010 World Swimming Championships at which he competed. He qualified for the 50 meter breaststroke finals after posting the eighth best qualifying time. He finished seventh overall. In the 50 meter butterfly, he finished tenth after failing to qualify for the finals. He was one of four Spanish swimmers at the World Championships that were affiliated with CTEIB, an institute created by the Government of the Balearic Islands intended to provide an education to elite high-performance sportspeople. He set a minimum Spanish qualifying time for the London Paralympic Games at the Son Hugo Municipal Swimming Pool in February 2012. In May 2012, he trained in Palma de Mallorca, in the Balearic Islands.

=== Paralympics ===
Torres competed at the 1992 Sumner Paralympics 1996 Summer Paralympics, 2000 Summer Paralympics, 2004 Summer Paralympics, 2008 Summer Paralympics and 2012 Summer Paralympics. In 1992 he won 2 goles, 2 silver and 1 bronze. In 1996, he won a gold medal in the 150-meter individual medley, a silver in the 4 × 50-meter 20-point freestyle relay, and a bronze in the 4 × 50-meter 20-point medley relay. In 2000, he finished first in the 150-meter individual medley, the 4 × 50-meter 20-point freestyle relay, and the 4 × 50-meter 20-point medley relay, and also won a bronze in the 50-meter breaststroke. In 2004, he earned a silver in the 150-meter individual medley and a bronze in the 4 × 50-meter 20-point medley relay. In 2008, he won a silver medal in the 150-meter individual medley.
