= Omielan =

Omielan is a surname. Notable people with this surname include:

- Anna Omielan (born 1993), Polish Paralympic swimmer
- Luisa Omielan (born 1982), British comedian
