= 2009 IPC Swimming European Championships – Women's 100 metre backstroke =

The women's 100 metre backstroke at the 2009 IPC Swimming European Championships was held at Laugardalslaug in Reykjavik from 18–24 October.

== Medalists ==
Event	Gold		Silver		Bronze	
S6	Nyree Lewis; Great Britain	1:27.22	Anastasia Diodorova; Russia	1:33.68	Julia Castello Farre; Spain	1:36.55
S7	Kirsten Bruhn; Germany	1:12.63 WR	Verena Schott; Germany	1:30.44	Ingvill Hilleren; Norway	1:41.18
S9	Stephanie Millward (S9); Great Britain	1:10.58	Elizabeth Simpkin (S9); Great Britain	1:15.52	Heather Frederiksen (S8); Great Britain	1:16.08
S10	Esther Morales Fernandez; Spain	1:13.45 ER	Emma Cattle; Great Britain	1:14.09	Elodie Lorandi; France	1:15.86
S13	Anna Efimenko (S12); Russia	1:11.87 ER	Iryna Balashova (S13); Ukraine	1:12.70	Lauren Hobbins (S13); Great Britain	1:16.08
S14	Stephanie Bird; Great Britain	1:16.67	Leung Shu Hang; Hong Kong	1:16.88	Marlou van der Kulk; Netherlands	1:16.94

== See also ==
- List of IPC world records in swimming
