= 2009 IPC Swimming European Championships – Men's 4 × 100 metre medley relay =

The men's 4 x 100 metre medley relay at the 2009 IPC Swimming European Championships was held at Laugardalslaug in Reykjavik from 18 to 24 October.

== Medalists ==
Event	Gold		Silver		Bronze	
34pts	Ievgen Poltavskyi (S8); Andriy Kalyna (SB8); Andriy Sirovatchenko (S9); Taras Yastremskyy (S9); Ukraine	4:21.16	Thomas Young (S8); Sam Hynd (SB8); Richard Howard (S8); Robert Welbourn (S10); Great Britain	4:23.49	Daniel Schaefer (S8); Martin Schulz (SB8); Lucas Ludwig (S10); Christoph Burkard (S8); Germany	4:29.48

== See also ==
- List of IPC world records in swimming
