= 2009 IPC Swimming European Championships – Men's 200 metre individual medley =

The men's 200 metre individual medley at the 2009 IPC Swimming European Championships was held at Laugardalslaug in Reykjavik from 18–24 October.

== Medalists ==
Event	Gold		Silver		Bronze	
SM6	Sascha Kindred; Great Britain	2:44.97	Yevheniy Bohodayko; Ukraine	2:52.80	Matthew Whorwood; Great Britain	2:55.16
SM7	Mihovil Spanja; Croatia	2:38.56 ER	Matthew Walker; Great Britain	2:57.95	Oleksandr Komarov; Ukraine	3:00.84
SM8	Sam Hynd; Great Britain	2:28.18	Richard Howard; Great Britain	2:32.17	Thomas Young; Great Britain	2:34.34
SM9	Andriy Kalyna; Ukraine	2:19.14	Martin Schulz; Germany	2:23.36	Federico Morlacchi; Italy	2:24.82
SM10	Lucas Ludwig; Germany	2:15.95 ER	Sven Decaesstecker; Belgium	2:17.73	Robert Welbourn; Great Britain	2:19.36
SM12	Maksym Veraksa; Ukraine	2:11.56 WR	Sergey Punko; Russia	2:15.67	Aleksandr Nevolin-Svetov; Russia	2:17.81
SM13	Oleksii Fedyna; Ukraine	2:11.84 WR	Danylo Chufarov; Ukraine	2:16.11	Dzmitry Salei; Belarus	2:17.72
SM14	Daniel Pepper; Great Britain	2:18.74	Ben Procter; Great Britain	2:19.24	Marc Evers; Netherlands	2:25.55

== See also ==
- List of IPC world records in swimming
