= Ganna Ielisavetska =

Ukrainian Paralympic swimmer

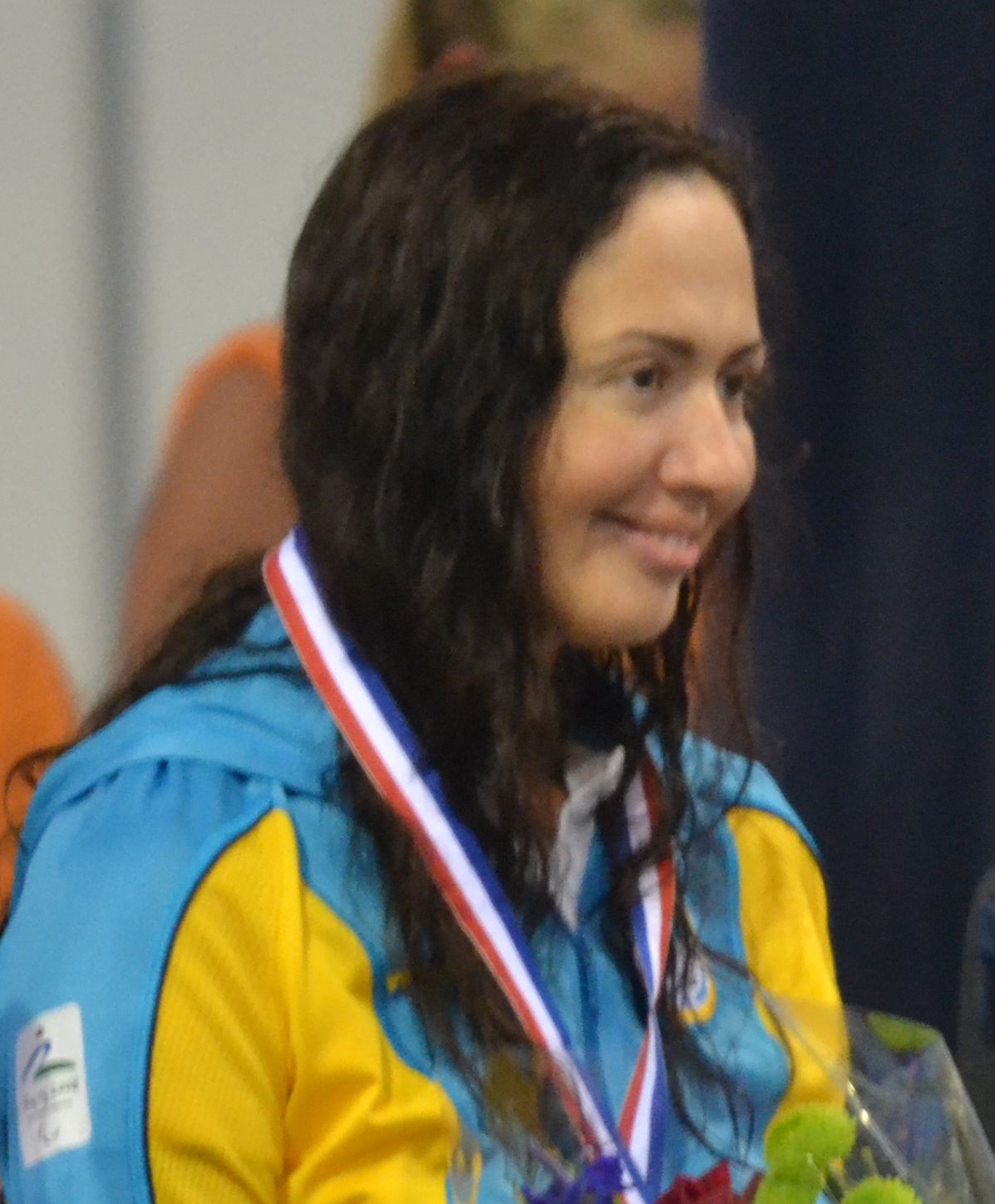
- Ielisavetska after receiving one of her medals at the 2014 IPC Swimming European Championships

Personal information
- Nationality: Ukrainian
- Born: Dnepropetrovsk, Ukraine

Sport
- Sport: Swimming
- Strokes: Freestyle, backstroke
- Club: Invasport: Dnipropetrovsk
- Coach: Gennady Vdovychenko
Medal record
| Event | 1st | 2nd | 3rd |
|---|---|---|---|
| Paralympic Games | 1 | 1 | 0 |
| World Championships | 7 | 1 | 0 |
| European Championships | 2 | 0 | 0 |
Swimming
Representing Ukraine
Paralympic Games
| Gold medal – first place | 2008 Beijing | 50 metre backstroke - S2 |
| Silver medal – second place | 2012 London | 50 metre backstroke - S2 |
IPC World Championships
| Gold medal – first place | 2010 Eindhoven | 50 m freestyle S2 |
| Gold medal – first place | 2010 Eindhoven | 100 m freestyle S2 |
| Gold medal – first place | 2010 Eindhoven | 200 m freestyle S2 |
| Gold medal – first place | 2010 Eindhoven | 50 m backstroke S2 |
| Gold medal – first place | 2010 Eindhoven | 4x50 m freestyle relay 20pts |
| Silver medal – second place | 2010 Eindhoven | 4x50 m medley relay 20pts |
| Gold medal – first place | 2013 Montreal | 50 m backstroke S2 |
| Gold medal – first place | 2013 Montreal | 100 m freestyle S2 |
IPC European Championships
| Gold medal – first place | 2009 Reykjavik | 50 m freestyle S2 |
| Gold medal – first place | 2009 Reykjavik | 50 m backstroke S2 |
| Gold medal – first place | 2009 Reykjavik | 4x50 m medley 20pts |

Ganna Ielisavetska is a paralympic swimmer from Ukraine competing mainly in category S2 events.

She competed as part of the Ukrainian team in the 2008 Summer Paralympics. She competed in the only event for her disability classification, the 50 metres (160 ft) backstroke, winning the gold medal in a new world-record time ahead of teammate Iryna Sotska and S1 class world record breaker Sara Carracelas García of Spain.
