= Karina Lauridsen =

Danish Paralympic swimmer

Personal information
- Nationality: Danish
- Born: 1 December 1976 (age 49) Esbjerg, Denmark

Sport
- Country: Denmark
- Sport: Paralympic athletics / Swimming
- Disability class: F55, S5,
- Event: Throwing events
- Club: Swim Team Esbjerg
Medal record
Event	1st	2nd	3rd
Paralympic Games	1	0	1
World Championships	4	4	2
European Championships	1	1	0
Representing Denmark
Paralympic athletics
IPC Athletics World Championships
Bronze medal – third place	2002 Lille	Shot put F55
Women's Paralympic swimming
Paralympic Games
Gold medal – first place	2008 Beijing	150m medley S5
Bronze medal – third place	2008 Beijing	50m backstroke S5
IPC World Championships
Gold medal – first place	2006 Durban	150 m medley SM4
Gold medal – first place	2010 Eindhoven	100 m breaststroke SB3
Gold medal – first place	2010 Eindhoven	150 m medley SM4
Silver medal – second place	2006 Durban	150 breaststroke SB3
Silver medal – second place	2006 Durban	50 m backstroke S5
Bronze medal – third place	2010 Eindhoven	50 m backstroke S5
IPC World Championships (SC)
Gold medal – first place	2009 Rio de Janeiro	50 m breaststroke SB3
Silver medal – second place	2009 Rio de Janeiro	100m freestyle S5
Silver medal – second place	2009 Rio de Janeiro	50 m backstroke S5
Bronze medal – third place	2009 Rio de Janeiro	50 m freestyle S5
IPC European Championships
Gold medal – first place	2009 Reykjavik	50m breaststroke SB3
Silver medal – second place	2009 Reykjavik	50m backstroke S5

Karina Lauridsen (born 11 December 1976) is a former Paralympic athlete from Denmark. Lauridsen represented her country at the 2008 Summer Paralympics in Beijing winning a bronze and gold medal. She has won multiple medals over three World Championships at both long course and short course events. She has also won a bronze medal as a shot putter in the 2002 IPC World Athletics Championships.

== Personal history ==
Lauridsen was born in Esbjerg, Denmark. After a parachute accident in 2001 she was left with paralysis in both legs.

== Career history ==
In 2002 Lauridsen represented Denmark when she took part in the 2002 IPC Athletics World Championships in Lille entering the shot put as a category F55 athlete. There she threw a distance of 7.19m to win the bronze medal. Four years later she was back on the international stage, but she had changed discipline to represent Denmark as a swimmer. In the 2006 IPC Swimming World Championships held in Durban she entered five events winning medals in three, gold in the 150m individual medley SM$ and silver in 50m backstroke S5 and the 50m breaststroke SB3. The next year, at an open meet in Berlin which acted as a qualifier for the 2008 Summer Paralympics, Lauridsen took gold in both the 100m backstroke S5 and the 150m individual medley SM4. Her time in the 100m backstroke of 1:32.91 set a new world record and ensured her a place in the Beijing Paralympic Games.

At the 2008 Summer Paralympics Lauridsen entered four events. She came fifth in the 100m Backstroke S6, which was a strong performance given that she was up against athletes with less severe disabilities, as her S5 category was not run. She finished seventh in 50m freestyle S5, but won a bronze medal in the 50m backstroke S5 and set a world record when she won the 150m medley S5 in a time of 2:47.84. For her success in the 2008 Paralympics, Lauridsen was named Danish Disabled Sportsperson of the Year in 2009.

In 2009, she travelled to Rio de Janeiro to take part in the IPC World short course championships. She returned to Denmark with a bronze, two silvers and a gold in the 50m Breaststroke SB3. At the 2010 IPC Swimming World Championships held in Eindhoven, Lauridsen not only successfully defended her 150m individual medley event, but added a second gold by winning the 50m Breaststroke SB3 along with a bronze in the 50m breaststroke SB3.
