= Anders Olsson (swimmer) =

Swedish swimmer and triathlete

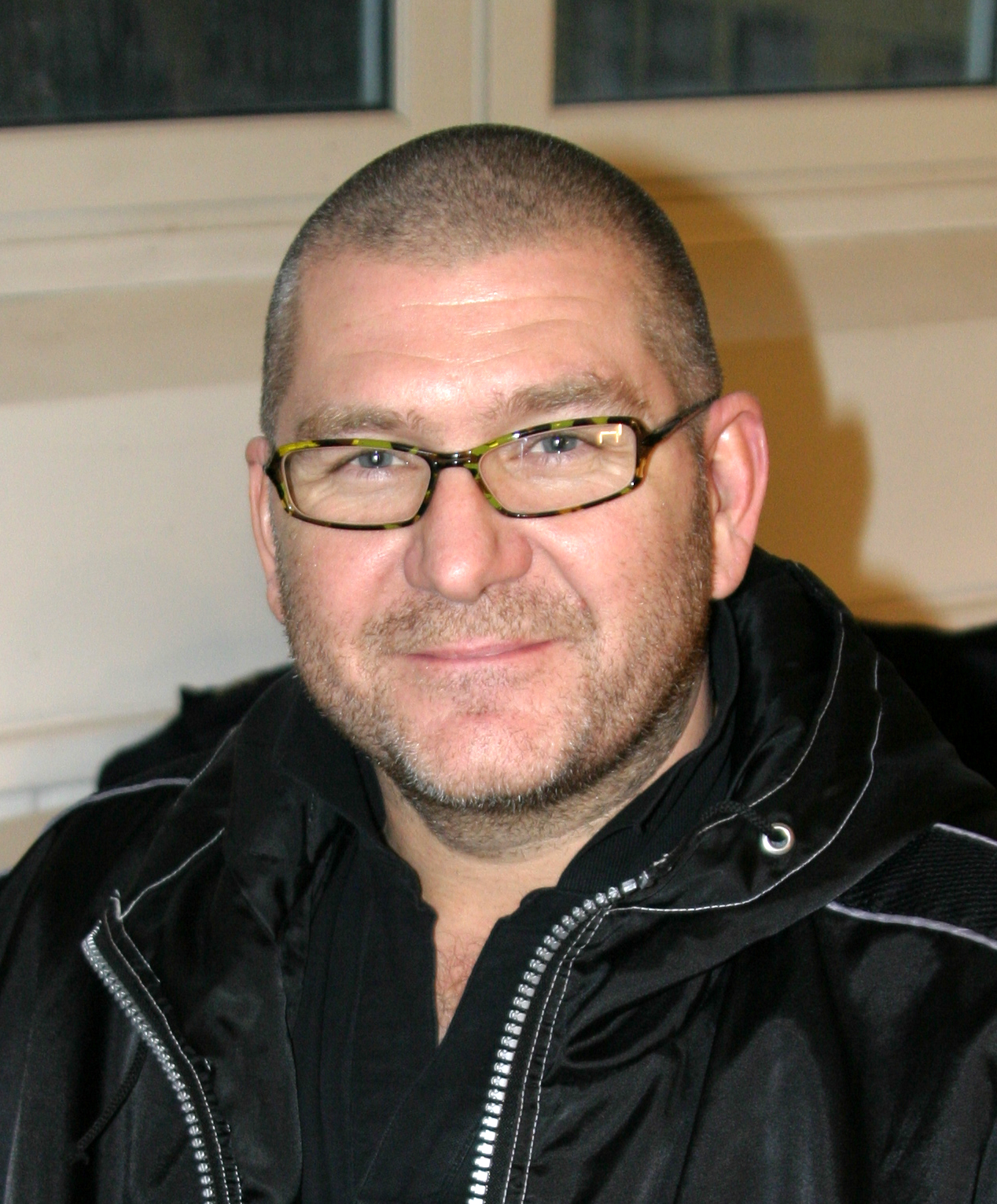
- Anders Olsson

Personal information
- Nationality: Swedish
- Born: 15 September 1965 (age 60) Hagfors, Sweden

Sport
- Sport: Swimming
- Strokes: Freestyle
Medal record
Men's swimming
Representing Sweden
Paralympic Games
Gold medal – first place	2004 Athens	400 m freestyle – S6
Gold medal – first place	2008 Beijing	100 m freestyle – S6
Gold medal – first place	2008 Beijing	400 m freestyle – S6
Silver medal – second place	2012 London	400 m freestyle – S6
Bronze medal – third place	2004 Athens	100 m freestyle – S6
Bronze medal – third place	2004 Athens	50 m freestyle – S6
Bronze medal – third place	2008 Beijing	50 m freestyle – S6
IPC World Championships
Gold medal – first place	2006 Durban	400 m freestyle – S6
Gold medal – first place	2006 Durban	100 m freestyle – S6
Silver medal – second place	2006 Durban	50 m freestyle – S6
IPC European Championships
Gold medal – first place	2009 Reykjavik	50 m freestyle – S6
Gold medal – first place	2009 Reykjavik	100 m freestyle – S6
Gold medal – first place	2009 Reykjavik	400 m freestyle – S6

Anders Olsson (born 15 September 1965 in Hagfors) is a Swedish swimmer and triathlete.

Olsson is paralysed from the waist down and has barely 50% lung capacity left after the injury.

== Career ==
Olsson began to swim at an early age and he was very promising. But in his early teens he started to have problems with his back, he had been in a weightlifting accident as a child. It was a faulty vertebra that caused him pain. For a long time he was able to keep up with his athletic life but after several years he had to undergo an arthrodesis operation. Due to an accident in the home he fell so badly that he tore several muscles in his back. This led to other complications. He had to undergo stomach surgery and because of a failure during the spinal anaesthesia he had to be treated in a medical ventilator and this finally led to him being paralysed from the waist down.

For several years Olsson was apathetic and got addicted to drugs, such as morphine, and other painkillers. But, in 2002, when a close friend made a bet with him that he would swim the vansbrosimmet an annual 3 km event in a river, his life took a turn for the better. He started to train and when he crossed the finish line he was in the top 100s out of over 3000 competitors. This is a result he later improved as he in 2007 came 9th.

In 2004 he competed in the Paralympics in Athens where he won one gold medal and two bronze medals. His favorite event is the 400 m freestyle, a distance he was undefeated at and where he is the current world record holder.

In 2005 he managed to complete the 90 km long Vasaloppet a crosscountry skiing competition, using a sled.

In 2008 he competed in the Paralympics in Beijing where he won another two gold medals (100 m & 400 m freestyle).

He won the annual swim competition at Alcatraz 2011, where he swam from the island to shore.

In the 2012 Paralympics he won silver in the 400m freestyle, the first time he had been beaten in this event in a major international competition.
