= Anna Efimenko =

Russian Paralympic swimmer

Medal record

Swimming

Representing Russia

Paralympic Games
Silver medal – second place	2008 Beijing	50 metre freestyle - S12
Silver medal – second place	2008 Beijing	100 metre freestyle - S12
Silver medal – second place	2008 Beijing	400 metre freestyle - S13
Bronze medal – third place	2008 Beijing	100 metre backstroke - S13

IPC World Championships
Gold medal – first place	2010 Eindhoven	400 metre freestyle - S12
Silver medal – second place	2010 Eindhoven	50 metre freestyle - S12
Silver medal – second place	2010 Eindhoven	100 metre freestyle - S12
Silver medal – second place	2010 Eindhoven	100 metre backstroke - S12

IPC European Championships
Gold medal – first place	2009 Reykjavik	50 m freestyle S12
Gold medal – first place	2009 Reykjavik	400 m freestyle S13
Gold medal – first place	2009 Reykjavik	100 m backstroke S13

Anna Efimenko is a Paralympic swimmer from Russia competing mainly in category S12 events, for visually impaired competitors.

Anna competed in four events at the 2008 Summer Paralympics winning three silver and a bronze. She won a bronze in the S13 backstroke and a silver in the S13 400 metres (1,300 ft) freestyle where she broke the world record for a S12 category swimmer. She also finished second in both the S12 50 metres (160 ft) and 100 metres (330 ft) freestyle events behind team mate Oxana Savchenko who set new world records in both distances.
