= 2009 IPC Swimming European Championships – Men's 100 metre breaststroke =

The men's 100 metre breaststroke at the 2009 IPC Swimming European Championships was held at Laugardalslaug in Reykjavik from 18–24 October.

== Medalists ==
Event	Gold		Silver		Bronze	
SB4	Ricardo Ten Argiles; Spain	1:38.85	Pablo Cimadevila; Spain	1:52.48	Antonios Tsapatakis; Greece	2:01.33
SB6	Mihovil Španja; Croatia	1:27.46	Christoph Burkard; Germany	1:27.55	Matthew Whorwood; Great Britain	1:31.91
SB7	Sascha Kindred; Great Britain	1:24.15	Iaroslav Semenenko; Ukraine	1:29.50	Ruslan Sadvakasov; Russia	1:32.70
SB8	Andriy Kalyna; Ukraine	1:07.73	Alejandro Sanchez; Spain	1:13.22	Onea Andreas; Austria	1:13.51
SB9	Pavel Poltavtsev; Russia	1:08.41 ER	Denis Dorogaev; Russia	1:09.57	Tamas Toth; Hungary	1:12.02
SB12	Sergey Punko; Russia	1:11.71	Enrique Floriano; Spain	1:13.38	Yury Rudzenko; Belarus	1:17.03
SB13	Oleksii Fedyna; Ukraine	1:07.04	Maksym Zavodnyy; Ukraine	1:08.62	Uladzimir Izotau; Belarus	1:10.65
SB14	Daniel Pepper; Great Britain	1:10.47	Nicholas Boylan; Great Britain	1:14.70	Jensen Ragnvaldur Atlason; Faroe Islands	1:17.20

== See also ==
- List of IPC world records in swimming
