= Einar Sveinsson =

Icelandic architect

Einar Sveinsson (16 November 1906 – 12 March 1973) was an Icelandic architect. He was the City Architect of Reykjavík between 1934 and 1973, and widely considered to have played a key role in shaping the appearance of Reykjavík in the mid-20th century.

Einar was the first Icelander to study architecture in Germany, doing so at the Technische Universität Darmstadt between 1927 and 1932. He completed his degree in 1932. Einar was influenced by the Bauhaus style and introduced functionalist architecture to Iceland.

Some of his notable works include Laugarnesskóli, Melaskóli, Langholtsskóli, Heilsuverndarstöð Reykjavíkur, Borgarspítalinn, Vogaskóli, Laugardalslaug, and the bus terminal at Snorrabraut 56, which he co-designed with Ágúst Pálsson. Melaskóli was considered so exquisite in its early years that foreign dignitaries were often brought to the building for meetings. He is widely considered to excel at crafting interiors.

At the time, he was criticized for the cost of many of his buildings. His buildings have, however, lasted long without renovation and thus proved quite cost-effective in the long-term.
