= Anthony Stephens =

British Paralympic swimmer

Personal information
- Full name: Anthony Stephens
- Nationality: British
- Born: 9 July 1987 (age 38) Reading, England
- Height: 1.75 m (5 ft 9 in)

Sport
- Sport: Swimming
- Club: Swansea HPC
Medal record
Men's swimming
Representing Great Britain
Paralympic Games
Silver medal – second place	2004 Athens	200 m freestyle -S5
Bronze medal – third place	2004 Athens	100 m freestyle – S5
Bronze medal – third place	2004 Athens	50 m freestyle – S5
Bronze medal – third place	2004 Athens	4x50 m freestyle relay– S5
Bronze medal – third place	2008 Beijing	200 m freestyle – S5
IPC European Championships
Gold medal – first place	2009 Reykjavik	50 m butterfly S5
Gold medal – first place	2009 Reykjavik	50 m backstroke S5
Silver medal – second place	2009 Reykjavik	50 m freestyle S5
Silver medal – second place	2009 Reykjavik	100 m freestyle S5
Silver medal – second place	2009 Reykjavik	4x50m medley relay 20pts
Silver medal – second place	2014 Eindhoven	Men's 200m freestyle S5

Anthony Stephens (born 9 July 1986) is a British swimmer who has participated in three Paralympic Games, winning five medals. He competes in S5 classification events.

== Career ==
Stephens began swimming at the age of three and by eight he was competing in national events. In 2003 he entered the British Championships taking gold in both the 200m Freestyle and 150m Individual Medley. He was selected for the Great Britain team in the 2004 Summer Paralympics in Athens. There he competed in seven events, the 50m, 100m and 200m Freestyle (S5), the 50m Backstroke (S5), 200m Individual Medley (S5) and the 4x50m Freestyle (20pts) and 4x50m Medley (20pts) relays.
