= Julia Castelló =

Spanish Paralympic swimmer

Personal information
- Full name: Julia Castelló Farré
- Nationality: Spain
- Born: 16 March 1990 (age 36) Barcelona, Spain

Sport
- Sport: Swimming
Medal record
Women's para swimming
Representing Spain
IPC World Championships
Bronze medal – third place	2015 Glasgow	SB5 100 m breaststroke
IPC European Championships
Gold medal – first place	2014 Eindhoven	4x50m mixed freestyle relay 20pts
Silver medal – second place	2014 Eindhoven	100m backstroke S6
Bronze medal – third place	2009 Reykjavik	100 m backstroke S6
Bronze medal – third place	2009 Reykjavik	4×100 m medley relay 34pts

Julia Castelló Farré (Note: In this Spanish name, the first or paternal surname is Castelló and the second or maternal family name is Farré.) (born 16 March 1990) is a Paralympic swimmer from Spain.

== Personal ==
Castelló is from the Catalan region of Spain. She has a physical disability. Living at the High Performance Centre (CAR) of San Cugat del Vallés in 2013, she shared a room with Melani Costa. The pair became roommates in October 2012, following the Olympic and Paralympic Games.

== Swimming ==
Castelló is an S6 classified swimmer. She is affiliated with the Spanish Federation of Sports for the Physically Disabled (FEDDF).

At the 2009 IPC Swimming European Championships in Reykjavík, Iceland, Sarai Gascón Moreno, Ana Rubio, Esther Morales Fernández and Julia Castelló won a bronze medal in the 4x100 meter medley relay. She won another two bronze medals at the competition. She was one of 42 Spanish team members, of which 22 had physical disabilities, 6 had cerebral palsy, 10 were blind and four had intellectual disabilities. In 2010, she attended a swimming camp with the national team that was part of the Paralympic High Performance Program (HARP Program). In 2010, she competed at the Tenerife International Open, where she set a world record for the S6 100 meter backstroke. She competed in the 2010 World Championship in the Netherlands. She failed to make the finals in the 50 meter butterfly.

Castelló competed at the 2011 IPC European Swimming Championships in Berlin, Germany, where she won a bronze medal. At the 2012 Paralympic Swimming Championship of Spain by Autonomous Communities, she set a world record in the 200 meter backstroke.

Castelló competed at the 2013 Swimming Championship of Catalonia, hosted by the Sabadell Swimming Club, where she was one of nine Spanish swimmers to set a qualifying time for the World Championships. She also set Spanish records at the competition in the 50 and 100 meter backstroke. She competed at the 2013 IPC Swimming World Championships. From the Catalan region of Spain, she was a recipient of a 2012 Plan ADO scholarship.
