= Jonathan Fox (swimmer) =

British Paralympic swimmer

Jonathan Fox MBE
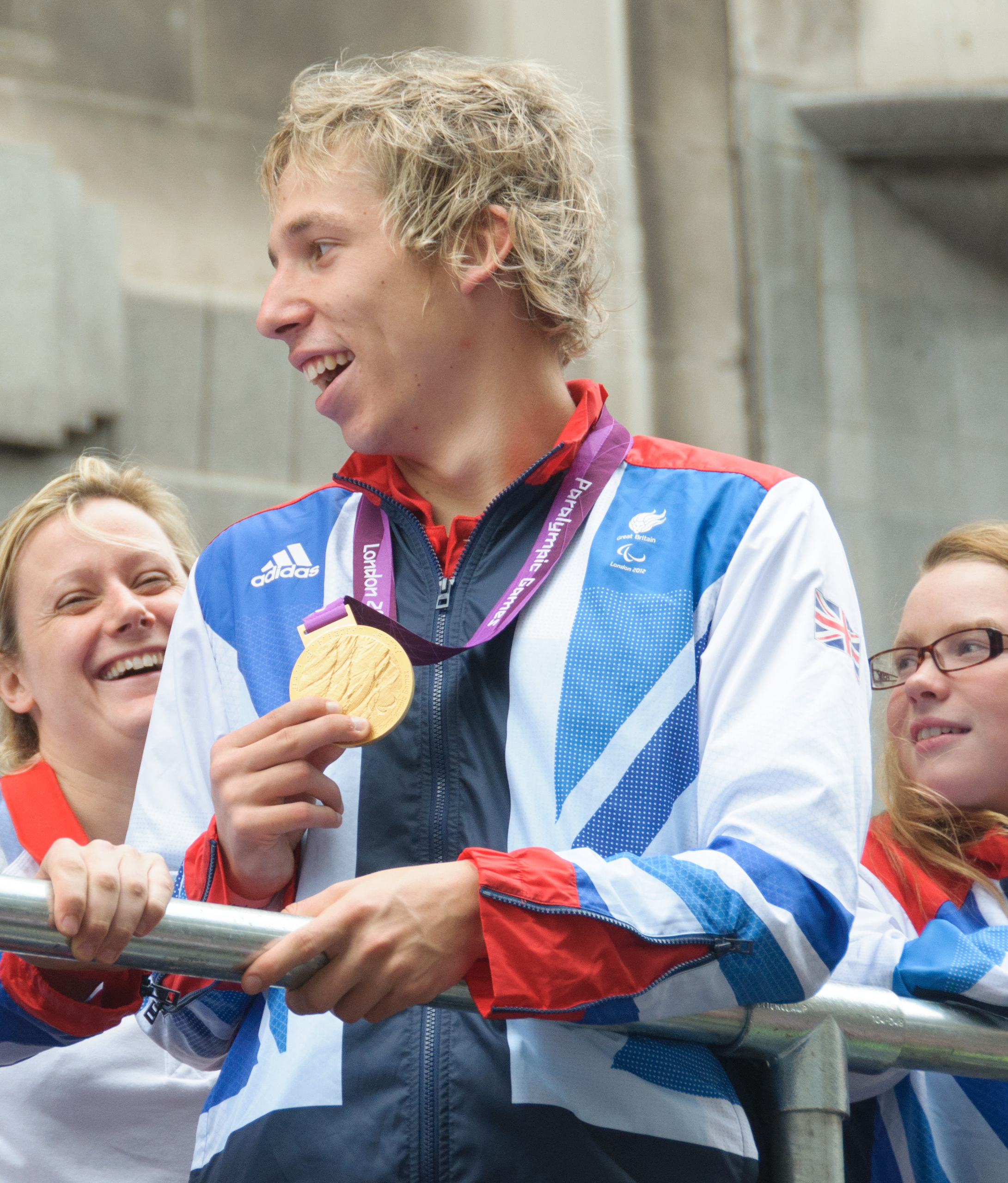
- Fox in 2012

Personal information
- Full name: Jonathan Andrew Fox
- Born: 30 May 1991 (age 35) Plymouth, Devon, England
Medal record
Men's swimming
Representing Great Britain
Paralympic Games
Gold medal – first place	2012 London	100 m backstroke – S7
Silver medal – second place	2008 Beijing	100 m backstroke – S7
IPC World Championships
Gold medal – first place	2010 Eindhoven	100 m backstroke – S7
Gold medal – first place	2013 Montreal	100 m backstroke – S7
Bronze medal – third place	2013 Montreal	400 m freestyle – S7
IPC European Championships
Gold medal – first place	2009 Reykjavik	400 m freestyle – S7
Gold medal – first place	2009 Reykjavik	4x100 m freestyle 34pts
Gold medal – first place	2009 Reykjavik	100 m freestyle – S7
Gold medal – first place	2009 Reykjavik	100 m backstroke – S7
Gold medal – first place	2016 Funchal	100 m backstroke – S7
Silver medal – second place	2009 Reykjavik	50 m freestyle – S7
Silver medal – second place	2016 Funchal	100 m freestyle S7

Jonathan Andrew Fox MBE (born 30 May 1991) is a British Paralympic swimmer.

== Personal life ==
Fox was born on 30 May 1991 in Plymouth, Devon, England. He was educated at Cornwall College, earning a BTEC in Sport and Science in 2007.

He was born with cerebral palsy and competes in the S7 Paralympic classification.

== Swimming ==
Fox was introduced to Paralympic swimming at a Regional Disability Swimming meet in 2001.

He represented Great Britain at the 2008 Summer Paralympics held in Beijing, China. Fox won a silver medal in the 100-metre backstroke S7 event. He also finished fifth in the 100-metre freestyle, eighth in the 50-metre freestyle and ninth in the 400-metre freestyle.

In 2009 at the International Paralympic Committee (IPC) European Swimming Championships held in Reykjavík, Iceland, he won three gold medals and two silver medals. At the 2010 IPC Swimming World Championships Fox won a gold medal in the 100-metre backstroke event and a bronze in the 400-metre freestyle. In the same year he won two gold medals and two bronze at the British Championships. In 2011 Fox won three gold, a silver and two bronze medals at the European Championships in Berlin as well as two gold medals at the British Championships.

Fox was selected to compete for Great Britain at the 2012 Summer Paralympics in the 50-metre freestyle, 100-metre freestyle, 400-metre freestyle and 100-metre backstroke events in the S7 classification. In the heats of the 100 m backstroke he broke his own world record, setting a time of one minute 9.86 seconds to qualify fastest for the final. He went on to win the final in a time of one minute 10.46 seconds to take Great Britain's first swimming gold medal at the Games.

As of February 2013, he holds S7 world records in long course 200-metre freestyle, 800-metre freestyle, 50 metres backstroke and 100 metres backstroke events.

== Honours ==
Fox was appointed Member of the Order of the British Empire (MBE) in the 2013 New Year Honours for services to swimming.

== See also ==
- 2012 Olympics gold post boxes in the United Kingdom
