= Sam Hynd =

British Paralympic swimmer (born 1991)

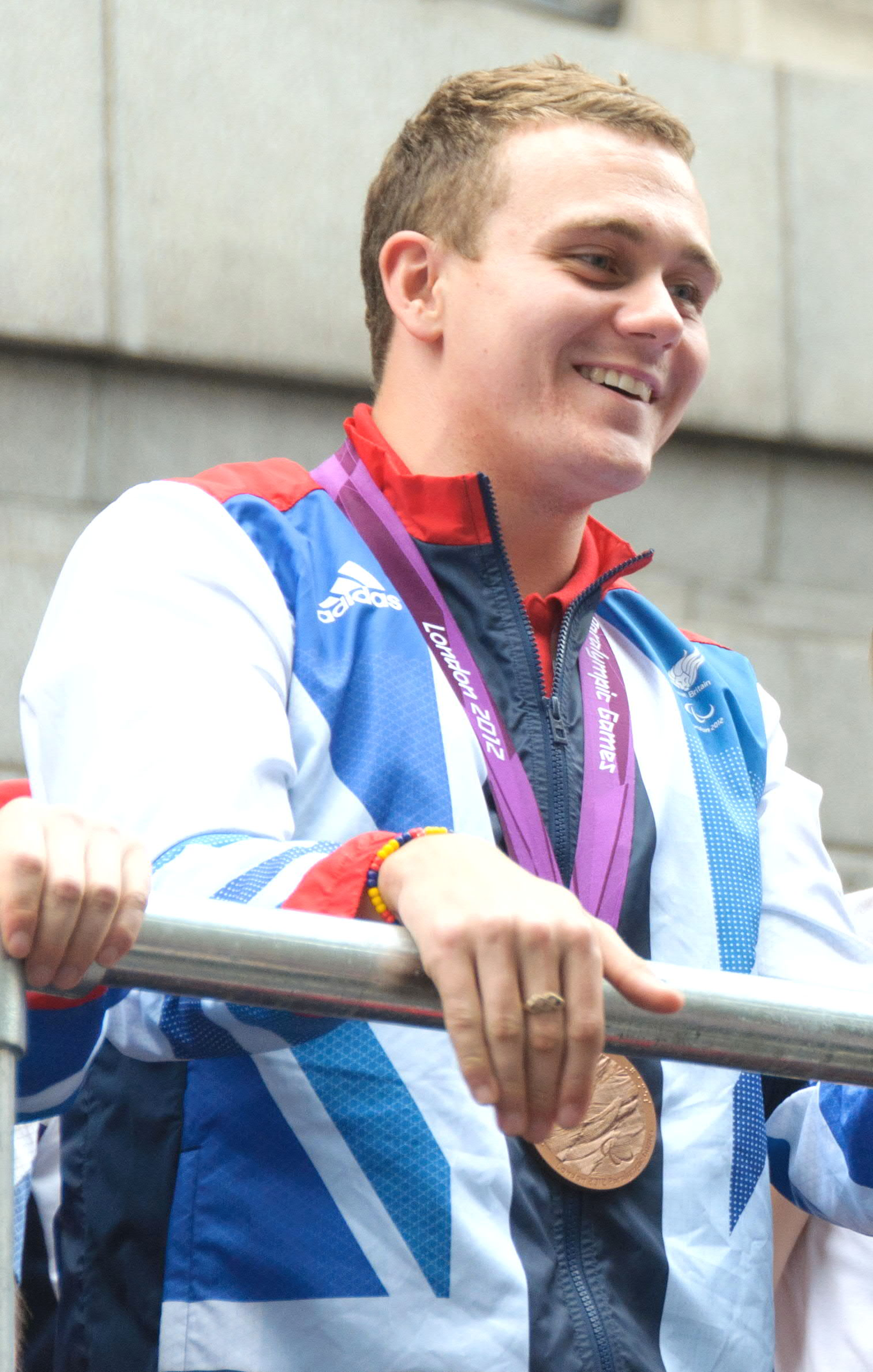

Personal information
- Born: 3 July 1991 (age 34)
- Height: 1.73 m (5 ft 8 in)
- Weight: 70 kg (154 lb)

Sport
- Country: United Kingdom
- Sport: Paralympic swimming
- Club: Swansea HPC / Swansea Performance
- Coached by: Billy Pye
Medal record
Paralympic Games
Gold medal – first place	2008 Beijing	Men's 400 m Freestyle S8
Bronze medal – third place	2008 Beijing	Men's 200 m Individual Medley SM8
Bronze medal – third place	2012 London	400 m freestyle S8
IPC World Championships - 25m
Gold medal – first place	2009 Rio de Janeiro	Men's 400 m Freestyle S8
Silver medal – second place	2009 Rio de Janeiro	200 m I.M. (SM8)
Bronze medal – third place	2009 Rio de Janeiro	100 m I.M. (SM8)
IPC European Championships
Gold medal – first place	2009 Reykjavík	Men's 400 m Freestyle S8
Gold medal – first place	2009 Reykjavik	200 m ind. medley – SM8
Gold medal – first place	2011 Berlin	Men's 400 m Freestyle S8
Silver medal – second place	2009 Reykjavik	4x100m medley relay 34pts
Silver medal – second place	2009 Reykjavík	4x100 m Medley Relay (34pts)
Bronze medal – third place	2011 Berlin	Men's 200 m Individual Medley SM8
Bronze medal – third place	2011 Berlin	4x100 m Medley Relay (34pts)

Sam Hynd (born 3 July 1991) is a retired British para-swimmer. He competed in the Paralympics as a S8 classification swimmer, having club feet and mild form of muscular dystrophy.

Hynd achieved significant success in the 400m Freestyle, winning gold at the 2008 Summer Paralympics, the 2009 and 2011 IPC European Championships, and the 2009 IPC World Championships. Oliver Hynd, Sam's younger brother, finished in second place at the 2011 European event.

Sam retired from competitive swimming in February 2014, at the age of 22.

== Recognition ==
Originally suggested by Charlotte Henshaw's father, Mansfield District ward councillor Paul Henshaw, to acknowledge the achievements of Ollie Hynd, the council voted in December 2014 to name the 25-metre laned pool at the town's Water Meadows complex as Hynds and Henshaw Competition Pool, to honour Sam, his brother Ollie and Charlotte Henshaw who all trained there.
