= Robert Welbourn =

British Paralympic swimmer

Medal record

Men's swimming

Representing Great Britain

Paralympic Games
Gold medal – first place	2004 Athens	4×100 m freestyle 34 pts
Gold medal – first place	2008 Beijing	4×100 m freestyle 34 pts
Silver medal – second place	2004 Athens	400 m freestyle S10
Silver medal – second place	2008 Beijing	400 m freestyle S10
Bronze medal – third place	2012 London	400 m freestyle S10

World Championships
Silver medal – second place	2013 Montreal	400 m freestyle S10
Bronze medal – third place	2010 Eindhoven	400 m freestyle S10
Bronze medal – third place	2010 Eindhoven	4×100 m freestyle 34 pts

European Championships
Gold medal – first place	2009 Reykjavik	400 m freestyle SM10
Gold medal – first place	2009 Reykjavik	4x100m freestyle relay 34pts
Gold medal – first place	2011 Berlin	400 m freestyle S10
Silver medal – second place	2009 Reykjavik	4x100m medley relay 34pts
Silver medal – second place	2011 Berlin	100 m freestyle S10
Bronze medal – third place	2009 Reykjavik	200 m ind. medley SM10
Bronze medal – third place	2009 Reykjavik	100 m freestyle – S10
Bronze medal – third place	2011 Berlin	200 m individual medley SM10
Bronze medal – third place	2011 Berlin	4×100 m freestyle 34 pts
Bronze medal – third place	2014 Eindhoven	4x100m freestyle relay 34pts

Robert Welbourn (born 11 June 1987) is a British Paralympian swimmer. He was born in Chesterfield. He began his swimming career at Deeping Swimming Club in Deeping St. James.

At both the 2004 and 2008 Summer Paralympics he won gold medals in the 4x100 metre freestyle relay (34 points) and silver medals in the 400 metre freestyle (S10) events.

In 2013 Welbourn was part of the British team that competed at the IPC Swimming World Championships in Montreal. He took silver in the 400m freestyle, finishing behind America's Ian Jaryd Silverman.
