= Běla Hlaváčková =

Czech Paralympic swimmer

Personal information
- National team: Czech Republic
- Born: 18 April 1976 (age 50) Náchod, Czech Republic

Sport
- Sport: Swimming
Medal record
Swimming
Representing Czech Republic
Paralympic Games
Gold medal – first place	2004 Athens	50m backstroke S5
Gold medal – first place	2008 Beijing	50m backstroke S5
Gold medal – first place	2008 Beijing	100m breaststroke SB4
Silver medal – second place	2008 Beijing	50m freestyle
Bronze medal – third place	2008 Beijing	100m freestyle
IPC World Championships
Silver medal – second place	2010 Eindhoven	50m freestyle S5
Silver medal – second place	2010 Eindhoven	50m backstroke S5
Silver medal – second place	2015 Glasgow	50m backstroke S5
Bronze medal – third place	2010 Eindhoven	100m breaststroke SB4
IPC European Championships
Gold medal – first place	2009 Reykjavik	100 m breaststroke SB4
Gold medal – first place	2009 Reykjavik	100 m freestyle S5
Silver medal – second place	2009 Reykjavik	50 m freestyle S5

Běla Třebínová (née Hlaváčková, born 18 April 1976) is a Czech Paralympic swimmer. She has competed in two Summer Paralympics winning a total of five medals, including gold in the 50m freestyle at both Athens in 2004 and Beijing in 2008.

== Career history ==
Hlaváčková was born in 1976 in Náchod which is now in the Czech Republic and took to swimming from the age of 9. In 1999 she had to undergo spinal surgery, but she never fully recovered. She now has to use a wheelchair. She married the same year.

in 2001 she won a gold, silver and two bronze medals at the European championships in the S5 category. In the world championships in Argentina she took a bronze medal in the 50m freestyle as well as establishing a world record time for the 50 metre backstroke. For this she received a gold medal.

Hlaváčková has a son.
