= Olesya Vladykina =

Russian Paralympic swimmer

Olesya Vladikina
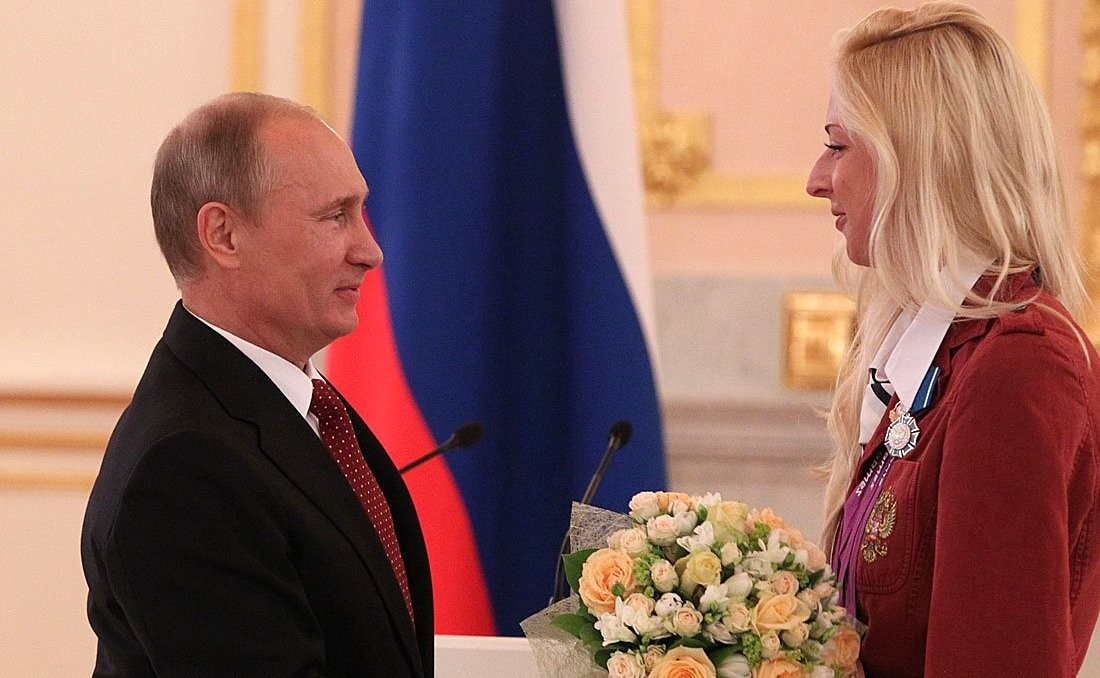
- Olesya Vladikina in 2012

Personal information
- Full name: Olesya Yuriyevna Vladykina
- Nationality: Russian
- Born: 14 February 1988 (age 38) Moscow, Soviet Union
- Height: 1.80 m (5 ft 11 in)
- Weight: 46 kg (101 lb)

Sport
- Sport: Swimming
- Strokes: Breaststroke, Freestyle
- Classifications: SB8
- Coach: Sergey Zhilkin
Medal record
Women's swimming
Representing Russia
Paralympic Games
Gold medal – first place	2008 Beijing	100 m breaststroke - SB8
Gold medal – first place	2012 London	100 m breaststroke - SB8
Silver medal – second place	2012 London	200 m individual medley - SM8
IPC World Championships
Gold medal – first place	2010 Eindhoven	100 m breaststroke SB8
Silver medal – second place	2010 Eindhoven	200 m medley SM8
Bronze medal – third place	2010 Eindhoven	50 m freestylre S8
Bronze medal – third place	2010 Eindhoven	4x100 m medley 34pts
IPC World Championships (25m)
Silver medal – second place	2009 Rio de Janeiro	4x100 m medley 34pts
IPC European Championships
Gold medal – first place	2009 Reykjavik	200 m medley SM8
Gold medal – first place	2009 Reykjavík	100 m breaststroke SB8
Silver medal – second place	2009 Reykjavik	4×100 m medley relay 34pts

Olesya Yuriyevna Vladykina (Russian: Оле́ся Ю́рьевна Влады́кина, born 14 February 1988) is a Paralympic swimmer from Russia competing mainly in category SB8 events.

Vladykina competed in the 2008 Summer Paralympics in Beijing. She won gold in the 100m Breaststroke, setting a new world record time. She also finished fourth in the 200m individual medley.

== Career ==
Vladykina started swimming at Young People's Olympic Reserve Sports School 47 and practiced the sport professionally for 10 years until her entrance to Moscow State University of Railway Engineering, when she concentrated on her studies, leaving active swimming for a year until her injury.

She lost her left arm when she and some friends were in Thailand on holiday and their touring bus overturned; she also suffered the loss of her best friend in the accident. She resumed training a month after she was released from the hospital, and five months later she won the Beijing Paralympic final.
