= Anna Omielan =

Polish Paralympic swimmer

Personal information
- Nickname: Ania
- Born: 14 May 1993 (age 33) Białystok, Poland

Sport
- Country: Poland
- Sport: Paralympic swimming
- Disability class: S10
Medal record
Paralympic swimming
Representing Poland
World Championships
| Silver medal – second place | 2009 Reykjavik | Women's 400m freestyle S10 |
| Bronze medal – third place | 2009 Reykjavik | Women's 100m butterfly S10 |

Anna Omielan (born 14 May 1993) is a former Polish Paralympic swimmer who competed in international level events. She is a double European medalist and has competed at the 2008 Summer Paralympics but did not medal.

Omielan lost her left leg aged two years old in an agricultural accident when her lower leg was cut off by a lawn mower.
