= Diána Zámbó =

Hungarian Paralympic swimmer

Personal information
- Nickname: Dia
- Born: 19 January 1978 (age 48) Székesfehérvár, Hungary
- Education: University of Veszprém

Sport
- Country: Hungary
- Sport: Paralympic swimming
- Disability: Arthrogryposis
- Disability class: S5, SB6, SM5
Medal record
Paralympic swimming
Representing Hungary
Paralympic Games
Gold medal – first place	1996 Atlanta	Women's 4x50m medley relay S1-6
Bronze medal – third place	1992 Barcelona	Women's 50m butterfly S6
World Championships
Gold medal – first place	1994 Malta	Women's 4x50m medley relay S1-6
Bronze medal – third place	2006 Durban	Women's 50m butterfly S5

Diána Zámbó (born 19 January 1978) is a retired Hungarian Paralympic swimmer. She participated at six Paralympic Games and won two medals, including one gold at the 1996 Summer Paralympics in Atlanta.
