= Jennie Ekström =

Swedish Paralympic swimmer

Personal information
- Born: 16 June 1991 (age 35) Gothenburg, Sweden
- Home town: Lidköping, Sweden
- Height: 1.05 m (3 ft 5 in)

Sport
- Country: Sweden
- Sport: Para swimming
- Disability: Dysmelia
- Disability class: S4, SB2, SM3
- Club: Varabygdens Simsallskap
- Coached by: Isabel Bjerkegren; Andreas Jonerholm
Medal record
Para swimming
Representing Sweden
World Championships (LC)
Gold medal – first place	2010 Eindhoven	Women's 150m individual medley SM3
Silver medal – second place	2010 Eindhoven	Women's 50m freestyle S4
Silver medal – second place	2010 Eindhoven	Women's 50m breaststroke SB2
Silver medal – second place	2013 Montreal	Women's 50m breaststroke SB2
Silver medal – second place	2013 Montreal	Women's 150m individual medley SM3
Bronze medal – third place	2010 Eindhoven	Women's 100m freestyle S4
Bronze medal – third place	2010 Eindhoven	Women's 200m freestyle S4
Bronze medal – third place	2010 Eindhoven	Women's 50m backstroke S4
World Championships (SC)
Silver medal – second place	2009 Rio de Janeiro	Women's 50m freestyle S4
Silver medal – second place	2009 Rio de Janeiro	Women's 100m freestyle S4
Silver medal – second place	2009 Rio de Janeiro	Women's 50m breaststroke SB3
Bronze medal – third place	2009 Rio de Janeiro	Women's 50m backstroke S4
European Championships
Gold medal – first place	2009 Reykjavik	Women's 50m freestyle S4
Gold medal – first place	2009 Reykjavik	Women's 100m freestyle S4
Gold medal – first place	2009 Reykjavik	Women's 200m freestyle S4
Gold medal – first place	2014 Eindhoven	Women's 50m breaststroke SB2
Bronze medal – third place	2009 Reykjavik	Women's 50m backstroke S4
Bronze medal – third place	2009 Reykjavik	Women's 50m breaststroke SB3
Bronze medal – third place	2009 Reykjavik	Women's 150m individual medley SM3

Jennie Ekström (born 16 June 1991) is a former Swedish Paralympic swimmer who competed in international level events. She was born with dysmelia; she doesn't have a left arm, hip or thigh and has scoliosis.
