= Emma Hollis (swimmer) =

British Paralympic swimmer (born 1992)

Emma Hollis (born 20 January 1992 in Epping) is a Paralympic swimmer who is set to compete for Great Britain at the 2012 Summer Paralympics. She began swimming at age 4 on doctor's advice and made her international debut in 2009. Aside from swimming she is studying geography at Loughborough University. Both she and her brother James, who is also competing in swimming, have osteogenesis imperfecta.
