= Daniel Vidal Fuster =

Spanish swimmer

Daniel Vidal
Personal information
- Full name: Daniel Vidal Fuster
- Born: 30 December 1975 (age 50) Burriana, Spain

Sport
- Country: Spain
- Sport: Swimming (S6)
Medal record
Men's swimming
Representing Spain
Paralympic Games
Gold medal – first place	2000 Sydney	50m butterfly S6
Gold medal – first place	2000 Sydney	4x50m freestyle relay 20pts
Gold medal – first place	2000 Sydney	4x50m medley relay 20pts
Silver medal – second place	2000 Sydney	50m freestyle S6
Silver medal – second place	2004 Athens	50m freestyle S6
Silver medal – second place	2008 Beijing	4x50m freestyle relay 20pts
Bronze medal – third place	2004 Athens	50m butterfly S6
Bronze medal – third place	2004 Athens	4x50m medley relay 20pts
Bronze medal – third place	2008 Beijing	4x50m medley relay 20pts
World Para Swimming Championships
Gold medal – first place	2002 Mar del Plata	50m butterfly S6
Gold medal – first place	2002 Mar del Plata	4x50m freestyle relay 20pts
Gold medal – first place	2006 Durban	4x50m freestyle relay 20pts
Gold medal – first place	2010 Eindhoven	4x50m freestyle relay 20pts
Silver medal – second place	2002 Mar del Plata	50m freestyle S6
Silver medal – second place	2002 Mar del Plata	4x100m medley relay 34pts
Silver medal – second place	2006 Durban	4x50m medley relay 20pts
Bronze medal – third place	2002 Mar del Plata	100m freestyle S6
Bronze medal – third place	2010 Eindhoven	4x50m medley relay 20pts

Daniel Vidal Fuster (born 30 December 1975 in Burriana, Castellón) is an S6 swimmer from Spain. He competed at the 2000 Summer Paralympics. He finished first in the 50 meter butterfly race, the 4 x 50 meter medley relay and the 4 x 50 meter freestyle relay race. He finished second in the 50 meter freestyle race. He raced at the 2004 Summer Paralympics. He finished second in the 50 meter freestyle race. He finished third in the 50 meter butterfly race and the 4 x 50 meter medley relay. He raced at the 2008 Summer Paralympics. He finished second in the 4 x 50 meter freestyle relay race. He finished third in the 4 x 50 meter medley relay. He finished fourth in the 50 meter freestyle race. He finished fifth in the 50 meter butterfly race.

At the 2009 IPC European Swimming Championship in Reykjavík, Iceland, Vidal finished in the top three in at least one of his races. In 2010, he raced at the Tenerife International Open.
