= 2009 IPC Swimming European Championships =

International swimming competition

1st IPC Swimming European Championships
- Host city: Reykjavík, Iceland
- Date: 18–24 October
- Venue: Laugardalslaug
- Nations: 37
- Athletes: 650

The 2009 IPC Swimming European Championships was an international swimming competition. It was held in Reykjavík, Iceland and ran from 18 to 24 October. Around 650 athletes from 37 different countries attended. Great Britain finished top of the medal tables with 39 golds and 94 medals, both greater than any other country.

The 2009 Championships was the first IPC-run event where intellectual disability athletes were allowed to compete since the 2000 Summer Paralympic controversy. In the 2000 Sydney Games cheating by the Spanish basketball team resulted in the banning of all events for athletes with intellectual disabilities.

== Venue ==

The Championship was staged at the Laugardalslaug located in the north of Reykjavík.

== Events ==
=== Classification ===
Athletes are allocated a classification for each event based upon their disability to allow fairer competition between athletes of similar ability. The classifications for swimming are:

- Visual impairment
  - S11-S13
- Intellectual impairment
  - S14
- Other disability
  - S1-S10 (Freestyle, backstroke and butterfly)
  - SB1-SB9 (breaststroke)
  - SM1-SM10 (individual medley)

Classifications run from S1 (severely disabled) to S10 (minimally disabled) for athletes with physical disabilities, and S11 (totally blind) to S13 (legally blind) for visually impaired athletes. Blind athletes must use blackened goggles.

=== Schedule ===
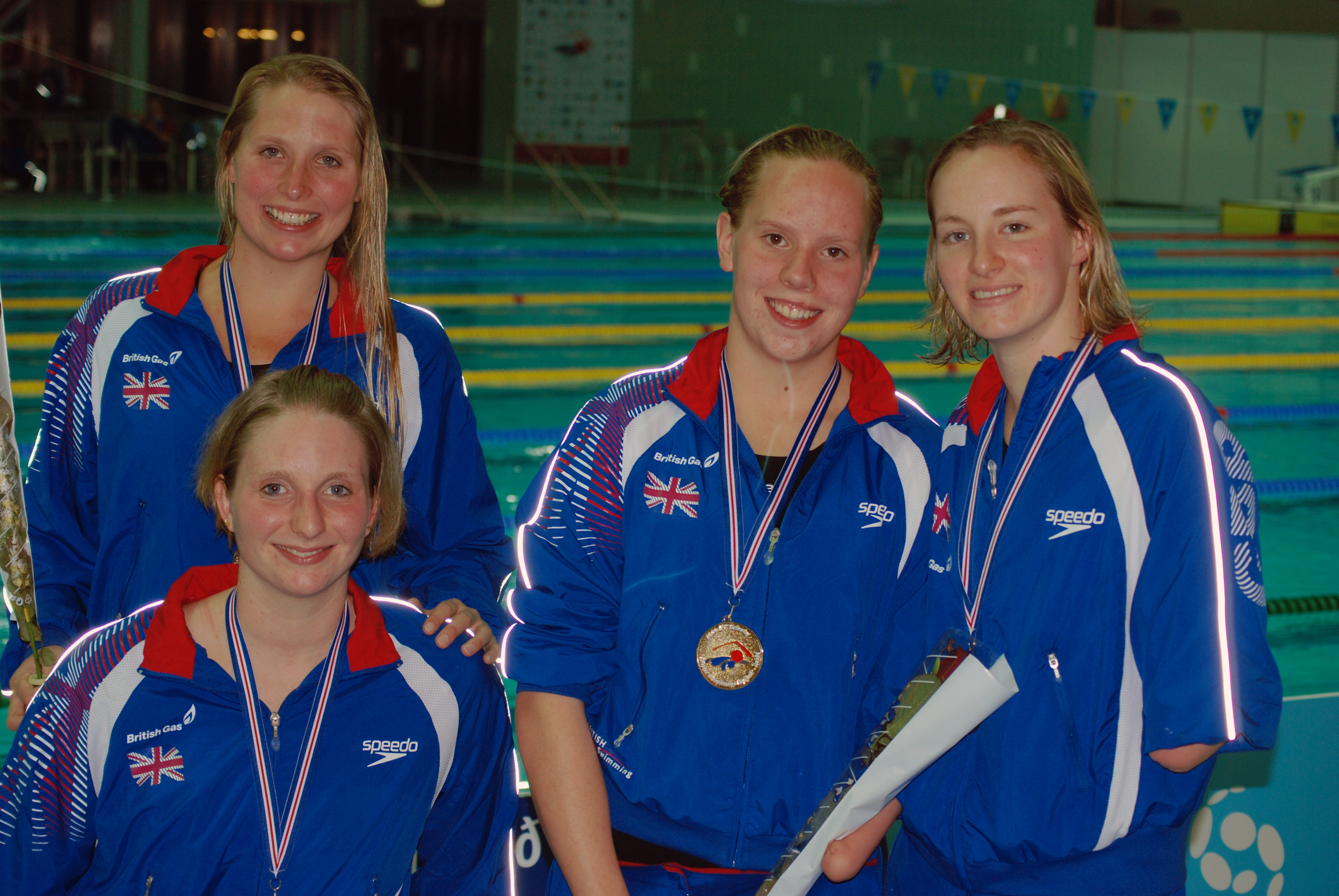
The winning Great Britain team for the women's 4 × 100 m medley - 34 points, wearing their medals at the Laugardalslaug.

Finals

Date →		18 Oct	19 Oct	20 Oct	21 Oct	22 Oct	23 Oct	24 Oct
50 m Freestyle	Men; Details	S1; S2; S3; S4; S5		S6; S7	S8; S11; S12; S13	S9; S10		
50 m Freestyle	Women; Details	S2; S4; S5		S6; S7	S8; S11; S12; S13	S9; S10		
100 m freestyle	Men; Details				S4	S6; S7	S2; S5; S8; S14	S9; S10; S11; S12; S13
100 m freestyle	Women; Details				S4	S6; S7	S2; S5; S8; S14	S9; S10; S11; S12; S13
200 m freestyle	Men; Details		S2					S4; S5
200 m freestyle	Women; Details		S4					S5
400 m freestyle	Men; Details	S6; S7		S8; S11	S9; S10	S12; S13		
400 m freestyle	Women; Details	S6; S7		S8	S9; S10	S13		
50m backstroke	Men; Details			S3; S4; S5				S1; S2
50m backstroke	Women; Details			S3; S4; S5				S2
100 m backstroke	Men; Details	S8		S14			S9; S10; S11; S12; S13	S6; S7
100 m backstroke	Women; Details			S14			S9; S10; S13	S6; S7
50 m breaststroke	Men; Details					SB3		
50 m breaststroke	Women; Details					SB3		
100m breaststroke	Men; Details		SB6; SB7; SB8; SB12; SB13	SB9	SB14	SB4		
100m breaststroke	Women; Details		SB6; SB7; SB8; SB13	SB9	SB14	SB4; SB5		
50 m butterfly	Men; Details		S4; S5				S6; S7	
50 m butterfly	Women; Details		S5				S6; S7	
100m butterfly	Men; Details	S9; S10		S12; S13		S8; S11		
100m butterfly	Women; Details	S9; S10	S13	S12		S8		
150m medley	Men; Details						SM3; SM4	
150m medley	Women; Details						SM4	
200m medley	Men; Details	SM12; SM13	SM9; SM10		SM6; SM7	SM14		SM8
200m medley	Women; Details	SM13	SM9; SM10		SM6; SM7	SM14		SM8
4×50m freestyle relays	Men; Details				20 pts			
4×50m medley relays	Men; Details					20 pts		
4×50m medley relays	Women; Details					20 pts		
4 × 100 m freestyle relays	Men; Details							34 pts
4 × 100 m freestyle relays	Women; Details							34 pts
4 × 100 m medley relays	Men; Details			34 pts				
4 × 100 m medley relays	Women; Details			34 pts				

== Medal table ==
Great Britain led the 2009 Championships in both medals won and number of gold medals.

* Host nation (Iceland)

Rank	Nation	Gold	Silver	Bronze	Total
1	Great Britain	39	32	23	94
2	Ukraine	29	15	17	61
3	Spain	16	19	16	51
4	Russia	14	20	10	44
5	Germany	9	15	14	38
6	Sweden	8	0	4	12
7	France	6	4	8	18
8	Poland	5	12	6	23
9	Hungary	5	4	4	13
10	Netherlands	4	5	8	17
11	Czech Republic	4	2	3	9
12	Israel	4	0	1	5
13	Croatia	3	3	1	7
14	Greece	2	5	10	17
15	Denmark	2	1	1	4
16	Italy	1	1	4	6
17	Estonia	1	0	0	1
18	Belarus	0	2	4	6
18	Portugal	0	2	4	6
20	Norway	0	2	3	5
21	Hong Kong	0	2	1	3
22	Ireland	0	2	0	2
23	Belgium	0	1	0	1
23	Iceland*	0	1	0	1
25	Slovakia	0	0	3	3
26	Switzerland	0	0	2	2
27	Austria	0	0	1	1
27	Faroe Islands	0	0	1	1
27	Lithuania	0	0	1	1
Totals (29 entries)		152	150	150	452

== Participating nations ==
Below is the list of countries who agreed to participate in the Championships and the requested number of athlete places for each.

- Austria
- Azerbaijan
- Belarus
- Belgium
- Croatia
- Cyprus
- Czech Republic
- Denmark
- Estonia
- Faroe Islands
- Finland
- France
- Germany
- Great Britain
- Greece
- Hungary
- Iceland
- Ireland
- Israel
- Italy
- Latvia
- Lithuania
- Malta
- Netherlands
- Norway
- Poland
- Portugal
- Romania
- Russia
- Serbia
- Slovenia
- Slovakia
- Spain
- Sweden
- Switzerland
- Turkey
- Ukraine

== Footnotes ==
Notes
