= Laugardalslaug =

Swimming pools in Reykjavík, Iceland

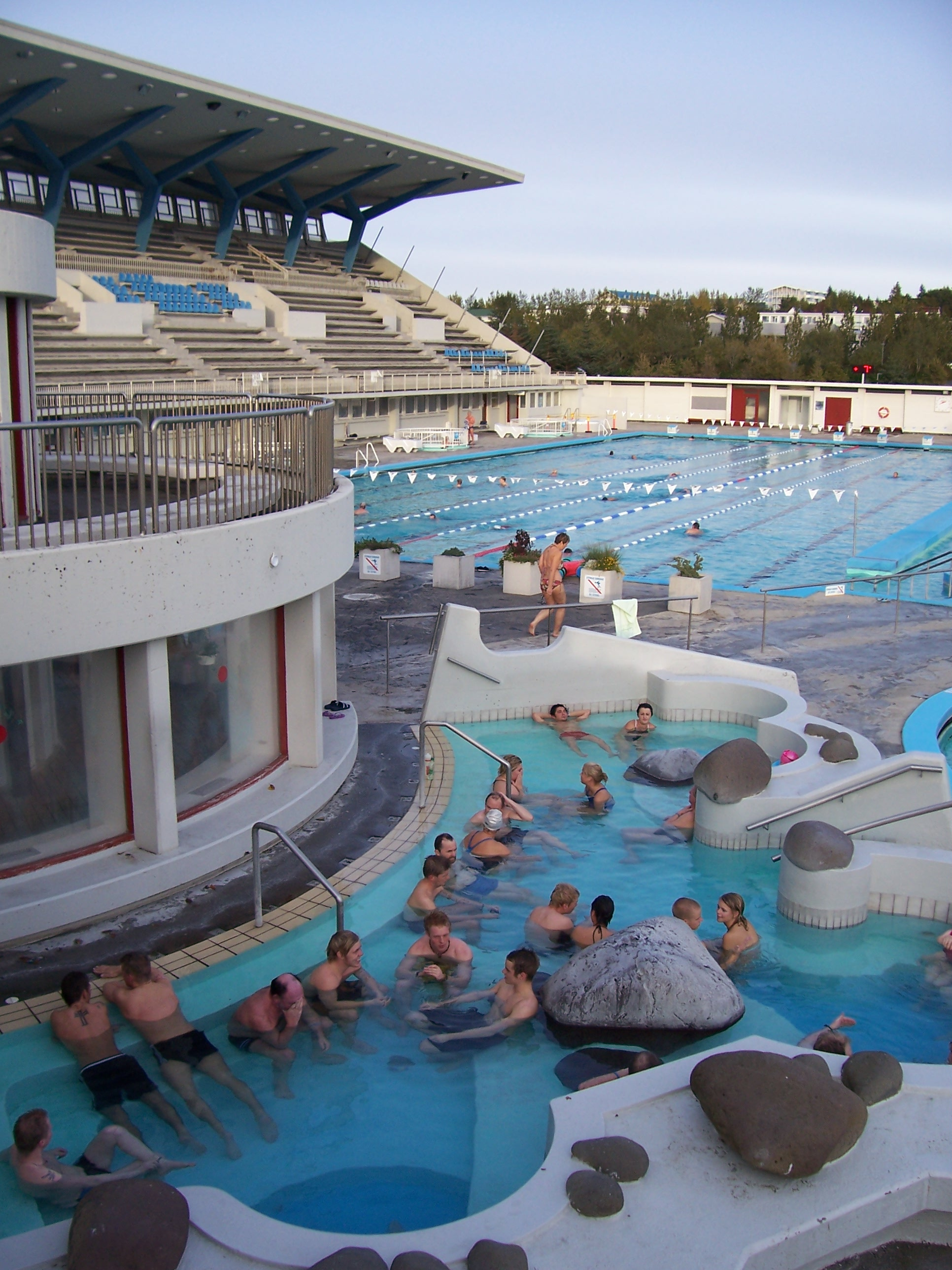
- Interactive map of Laugardalslaug
- Address: Sundlaugarvegur 30, 105); Reykjavík, Iceland
- Coordinates: 64°8′45″N 21°52′49″W
- Owner: City of Reykjavík
- Pool sizes: Outdoor: 50 m × 22 m (164 ft × 72 ft); Indoor: 50 m × 25 m (164 ft × 82 ft)

Construction
- Built: 1958–1968
- Opened: 1 June 1968
- Expanded: 1981–1986 and 2002–2005
- Architect: Einar Sveinsson (1968); Jes Einar Þorsteinsson (1986)

Website
- reykjavik.is/stadir/laugardalslaug

Laugardalslaug (Icelandic pronunciation: [ˈlœyːɣarˌtalsˌlœyːx], "pool of Laugardalur") is a public thermal baths and swimming pool complex located in the Laugardalur district of Iceland's capital Reykjavík. With an indoor Olympic-size swimming pool, a 50-metre-long outdoor swimming pool, a 400 m^{2} playing pool, 8 hot pots of various temperatures, and a 17 m^{2} steam bath, it is the largest conventional swimming pool complex in Iceland. Receiving about 800,000 visitors in 2010, it is the most visited thermal baths in Iceland after the Blue Lagoon.

The baths are owned by the City of Reykjavík, and are operated by its Department of Sport and Leisure (ÍTR; Íþrótta- og tómstundasvið Reykjavíkur.)

== History ==
The complex was constructed at its current location in 1958–1968, designed by city architect Einar Sveinsson, and was expanded in 1981–1986 by architect Jes Einar Þorsteinsson, and again in 2002–2005.

The hot springs of Laugardalur were mentioned by Þorkell Arngrímsson Vídalín in 1672. The springs were visited by Uno von Troil, Archbishop of Uppsala, on his journey to Iceland in 1772. He measured the water temperature at 89.4 °C.

== Pools ==
Pool	Temperature	Surface	Volume	Length	Width	Depth	Lanes	Opened
Indoor pool	28 °C	1,250 m^{2}	2,500 m^{3}	50 m	25 m	2 m	10	2005
Outdoor pool	28 °C	1,100 m^{2}	1,000 m^{3}	50 m	22 m	0.80–1.76 m	8	1968
Children's pool	29 °C	400 m^{2}	320 m^{3}			0.80 m		1968
Hot pot Iðulaug	39 °C	30 m^{2}	17 m^{3}					1986
Seawater pot	39 °C	20 m^{2}	15 m^{3}					2007
Indoor hot pot	39 °C	9 m^{2}	7 m^{3}					2005
Hot pot 1	40 °C	7 m^{2}	5.6 m^{3}					1968
Hot pot 2	38 °C	7 m^{2}	5.6 m^{3}					1968
Hot pot 3	42 °C	7 m^{2}	5.6 m^{3}					1968
Hot pot 4	44 °C	7 m^{2}	5.6 m^{3}					1968
Wading pool Diskur	32 °C	30 m^{2}	3 m^{3}			0.40 m		1968
Cold pot	6–8 °C	2 m^{2}	2 m^{3}					

== Photos ==
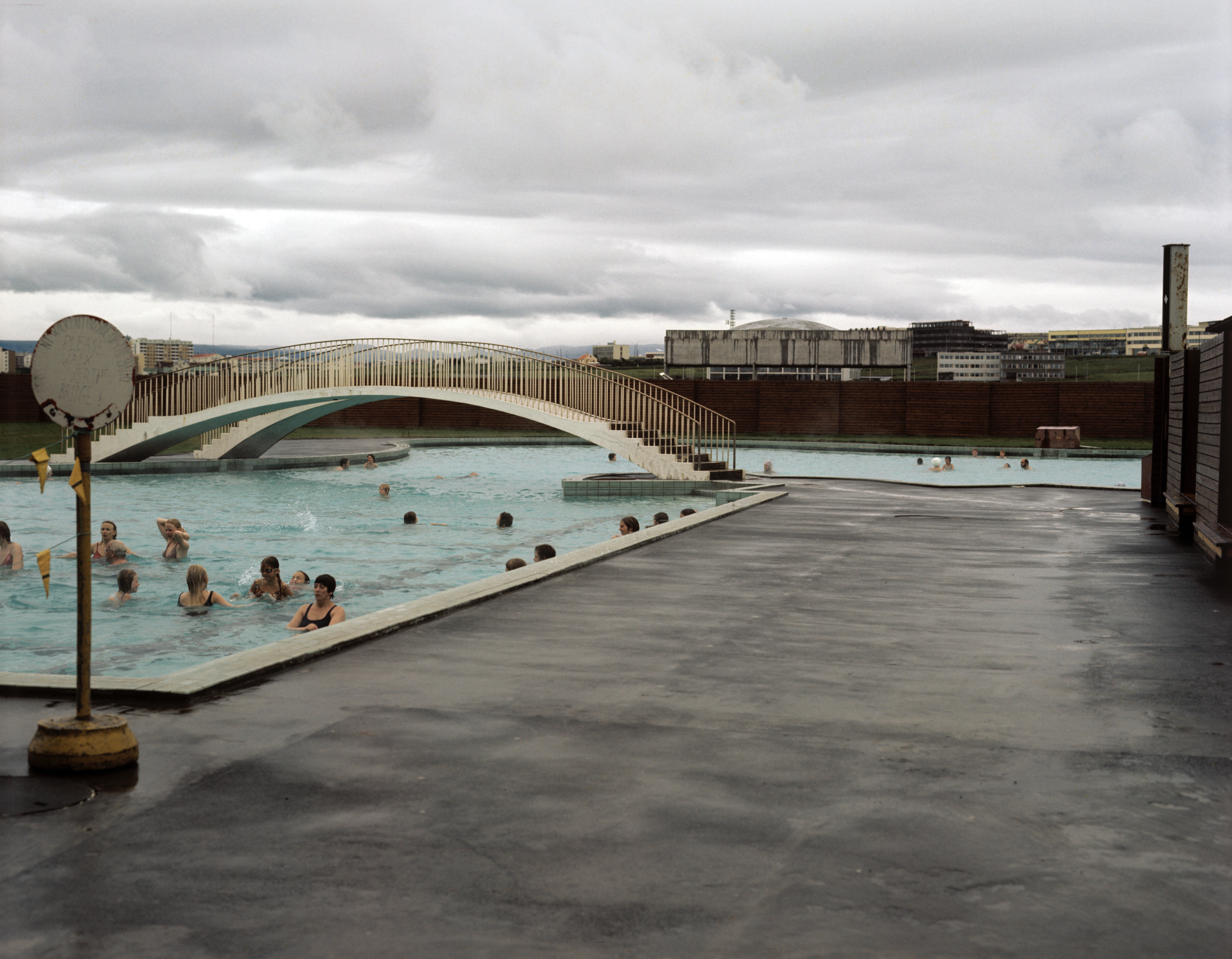

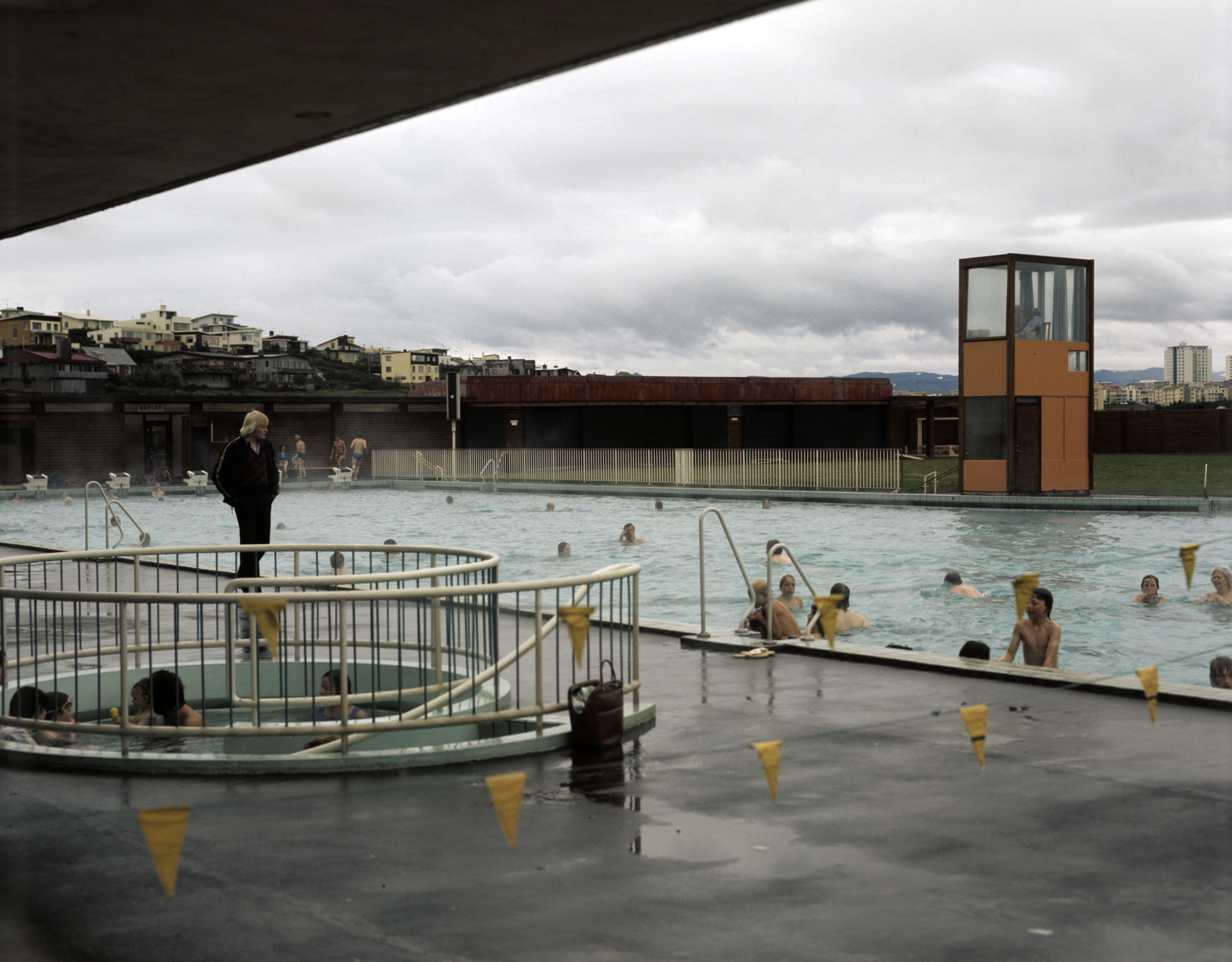

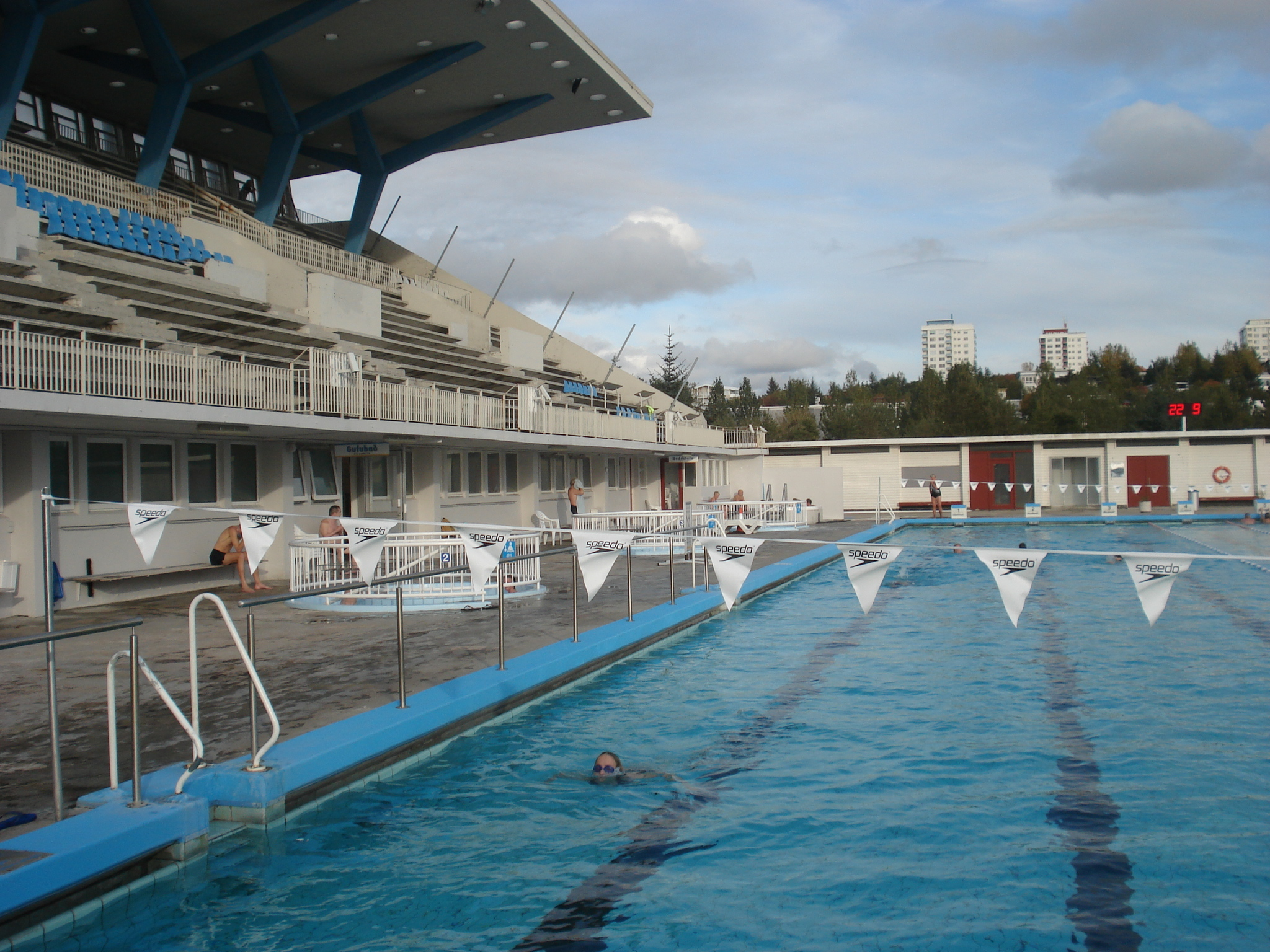
