= International Federation of Cerebral Palsy Football =

World governing body for cerebral palsy football

Worldwide
- Founded: January 1, 2015; 11 years ago
- Headquarters: Netherlands
- President: Jan-Hein Evers
- Website: ifcpf.com

The International Federation of Cerebral Palsy Football (IFCPF) is the world governing body for cerebral palsy football. It was founded in January 2015, when the governance of the sport transferred from the Cerebral Palsy International Sports and Recreation Association (CPISRA).

== History ==
From 1978 to 2014, cerebral palsy football was governed by the Cerebral Palsy International Sport and Recreation Association (CPISRA). On 1 January 2015, CP football became an independent sport and the International Federation of Cerebral Palsy Football (IFCPF) was created to govern the game. After the 2016 Paralympic Games, women CP football was started. The first-ever IFCPF Women's World Cup was played in 2022.

1. 1978 – 1st International CP Football competition for men
2. 1982 – First World Championship
3. 1984 – Inclusion within the Paralympic Games
4. 1985 – First Regional Championship in Glasgow
5. 2015 Inaugural IFCPF CP Football World Championships U19 at the CPISRA World Games
6. 2022 – First-ever IFCPF Women World Cup

== Governance ==
The president of IFCPF is Jan-Hein Evers of Netherlands. The organisation's secretary general is Sam Turner of England.

== Members ==
The IFCPF is organized zonally, with members belonging to one of five continental zones. These zones are Africa, the Americas, Asia, Europe and Oceania. These members are often either national cerebral palsy football associations, national cerebral palsy sports federations, national Paralympic committees, or national football associations. The type of member in the IFCPF varies by country.

=== Regional ===
88 nations:

1. Asia-Oceania: Iran, Australia, Thailand, Japan, South Korea, Indonesia, Myanmar, Cambodia, Singapore, India, Malaysia, Bangladesh, Brunei, China, Jordan, Kazakhstan, Kuwait, Kyrgyzstan, Macau, Mongolia, Nepal, New Zealand, Pakistan, Philippines, Qatar, Saudi Arabia, Sri Lanka, Timor-Leste, United Arab Emirates, Vietnam
2. Africa (13): Egypt, South Africa, Nigeria, Ghana, Algeria, Cape Verde, Kenya, Sierra Leone, Tunisia, Cameroon, Democratic Republic of the Congo, Somalia, Uganda
3. Americas (17): Brazil, United States, Argentina, Canada, Venezuela, Colombia, Chile, Peru, Costa Rica, Cuba, Ecuador, El Salvador, Honduras, Mexico, Nicaragua, Panama, Trinidad and Tobago
4. Europe (28): Ukraine, England, Netherlands, Ireland, Germany, Spain, Russia, Scotland, Northern Ireland, Italy, Denmark, Finland, Georgia, Austria, Belarus, Belgium, Bosnia and Herzegovina, France, Hungary, Luxembourg, Malta, Norway, Poland, Portugal, Sweden, Switzerland, Turkey, Wales

== Events ==
=== Games ===
1. Football 7-a-side at the Summer Paralympics
2. CP Football at the CP Games
3. CP Football at the Asian Para Games
4. CP Football at the ASEAN Para Games

=== Championship ===
==== Global ====
1. IFCPF World Cup
2. World Women CP Football Championships
3. CP Football Club World Cup

==== Regional ====
1. Pan American CP Football Championships
2. Asian CP Football Championships (Asia-Oceania)
3. African CP Football Championships
4. European CP Football Championships

== Ranking ==
Rankings - CP Football

=== Men ===
Men's Rankings - CP Football

As of December 2024:

1. Ukraine
2. Iran
3. Brazil
4. England
5. Netherlands

=== Women ===
Women's Rankings - CP Football

As of December 2023:

1. Australia
2. Japan
3. United States
4. Ireland
5. Denmark

== Player classification ==
CP football teams consist of seven ambulant athletes on the field of play, with cerebral palsy or a traumatic brain injury. In total, 14 players can be listed on the team sheet. In order to ensure fairness between two teams, each team must have two FT5 or FT6 (FT1) players on the field at all times and no more than one FT8 (FT3) player on the field at any time.

There are two sets of classifications that are used in CP Football: pre-2018 classifications and post-2018 classifications. Pre-2018, the classifications ranged from FT5 (CP5) to FT8 (CP8) where FT8 players show minimal impairment and FT5 players show more significant impairment. The Pre-2018 classifications are still used domestically.

Post-2018, the classification system was revamped and the eligible classification for international matches ranging from FT1–FT3. Players classed as FT1 are considered to have more significant impairment (FT5 and FT6 equivalent) and FT3 players have minimal impairment (FT8 equivalent). Both classification systems are based off an individual's type of movement and where the impairment is located.

== Relationships ==
In 2016, it signed a Memorandum of Understanding with Asian Football Confederation. Part of this involved the AFC supporting an AFC Youth CP Football Tournament in 2017. In 2014, 2015 and 2016, IFCPF was getting financial support from UEFA.

== Anti-doping ==
The IFCPF is a WADA signatory. In 2016, after getting an endorsement by the World AntiDoping Agency (WADA), the IFCPF Anti-Doping Code was formally amended to allow for out of competition testing. This was done through a WADA approved Whereabouts Programme managed through ADAMS. Drawing from players in a Registered Testing Pool, 10 players from 9 countries were initially included ahead of the 2016 Summer Paralympics in Rio. These countries included Netherlands, Japan, Russia, Iran, Argentina, Ireland, Ukraine, England, and Brazil.

== Records by country ==
Code	Federation (Note: Federation refers only to IFCPF recognized federations who is a member of the IFCPF. It does not include any other organizations involved with CP football in the country.)	National teams	Joined (Note: Joined: before 2015 then CPISRA IFCPF)	Doping (Note: This refers to the type of testing on the international level, where the anti-doping program is affiliated with the IFCPF's Anti-Doping Code.)	Ranking (Note: World Rankings 2016)	Paralympics Games	Championships		National league (Note: National league specifically refers to an IFCPF recognized national league or championship.)	Continent	Ref
Code	Federation	National teams	Joined	Doping	Ranking	Paralympics Games	World	Regional	National league	Continent	Ref
ARG	Argentina (FADEPAC)	Men's		OOC (Note: OOC stands for Out Of Competition testing, where national team players are on a testing list and are part of the ADAMS system.)	6	1996, 2000, 2004, 2012, 2016	1998, 2003, 2005, 2007, 2011, 2013, 2015, 2017	1995, 1999, 2002, 2007, 2010, 2014, 2015	2010, 2011, 2012, 2013, 2014, 2015, 2016, 2017	America	
AUS	Australia	Men's			14		2001, 2003, 2005, 2007, 2009, 2011, 2013, 2015, 2017	2006*, 2010*	2010, 2011, 2012, 2013, 2014, 2015, 2016, 2017	Oceania	
AUT	Austria	Men's			44=		1986		None	Europe	
BEL	Belgium	Men's			37=	1984, 1988, 1992	1982, 1986, 1990, 1994, 2001	1995, 1999	None	Europe	
BRA	Brazil	Men's		OOC	3	1992, 1996, 2000, 2004, 2008, 2012, 2016	1998, 2001, 2003, 2005, 2007, 2009, 2011, 2013, 2015, 2017	1995, 1999, 2002, 2007, 2010, 2014, 2015	2010, 2011, 2012, 2013, 2014, 2015, 2016, 2017	America	
CAM	Cambodia	Men's			27			2015, 2017	2014, 2015, 2016, 2017	Asia (Southeast)	
CAN	Canada	Men's			11	1984	2005, 2007, 2009, 2011, 2013, 2015, 2017	2007, 2010, 2014, 2015	2015, 2016, 2017	America	
CHI	Chile	Men's			17			1995, 1999, 2002	2016, 2017	America	
CHN	China (CDPF)	Men's			44=	2008	2007	2006, 2010	None	Asia	
COL	Colombia (FECDE PC)	Men's			19			2007	2011, 2012, 2013, 2014, 2015, 2016, 2017	America	
DEN	Denmark	Men's			22		1982	2010, 2014	None	Europe	
ENG	England	Men's	1978	OOC	7		2011, 2013, 2015, 2017	2010, 2014	2013, 2014, 2015, 2016, 2017	Europe	
ESP	Spain (FEDPC)	Men's			18	1992, 1996, 2000	1994, 1998, 2001, 2005, 2007, 2011, 2013, 2017	1995, 2002, 2006, 2010	2010, 2011, 2012, 2013, 2014, 2015, 2016, 2017	Europe	
FIN	Finland	Men's			29		2011	1999, 2006, 2010, 2014	None	Europe	
FRA	France	Men's			30		1994	1991	None	Europe	
GBR	(United Kingdom) Great Britain; England and Wales (CP Sport)	Men's			0	1984, 1992, 2008, 2012, 2016	1986, 1990, 1998, 2001, 2003, 2005, 2007	1991, 1995, 1999, 2002, 2006	None	Europe	
GER	Germany	Men's			10			2014	None	Europe	
GHA	Ghana (CPSRA Ghana)	Men's			37=				None (Note: None means that the ICFPF has never recognized a national championship, or that no national championship exists.)	Africa	
HND	Honduras	Men's	2017		44=					America	
IND	India	Men's	Jan. 2015		23				2014, 2015, 2016, 2017	Asia	
INA	Indonesia	Men's	Jan. 2015		25			2017	2014, 2015	Asia (Southeast)	
IRL	(Republic of Ireland) Ireland	Men's	1978	OOC	5	1984, 2016	1982, 1986, 1990, 1994, 2001, 2003, 2007, 2009, 2011, 2013, 2015, 2017	1991, 1999, 2002, 2006, 2010, 2014	None	Europe	
IRI	Iran	Men's		OOC	12	2004, 2008, 2012, 2016	2001, 2003, 2005, 2007, 2009, 2011, 2015, 2017	2006, 2010, 2014	2011, 2013, 2014, 2015, 2016, 2017	Asia	
ITA	Italy (FISPES)	Men's			0				None	Europe	
JOR	Jordan	Men's	Jan. 2015		37=				None	Asia	
JPN	Japan	Men's		OOC	16		2005, 2007, 2009, 2011, 2013, 2015, 2017	2006, 2010, 2014	2010, 2011, 2012, 2013, 2014, 2015, 2016, 2017	Asia	
KEN	Kenya	Men's	2017		0					Africa	
KOR	South Korea (KFCPF)	Men's			18	1988	2003, 2011	2006, 2010, 2014	2013, 2014, 2015, 2016, 2017	Asia	
LUX	Luxembourg	Men's	2017		0					Europe	
MAC	Macau	Men's			0				None	Asia	
MAS	Malaysia (NPC Malaysia)	Men's			0			2006*, 2014, 2015, 2017	None	Asia (Southeast)	
MEX	Mexico (FEMEDEPC)	Men's			44=			2010, 2014	2010, 2011, 2012, 2013, 2014, 2015, 2016, 2017	America	
MYA	Myanmar (NPC Myanmar)	Men's			0			2014, 2015, 2017	None	Asia (Southeast)	
NED	Netherlands (KNVB)	Men's		OOC	4	1988, 1992, 1996, 2000, 2004, 2008, 2012, 2016	1982, 1986, 1990, 1994, 1998, 2001, 2003, 2005, 2007, 2009, 2011, 2013, 2015, 2017	1991, 1995, 1999, 2002, 2006, 2010, 2014	None	Europe	
NGA	Nigeria	Men's	Jan. 2015		44=				2016, 2017	Africa	
NIR	Northern Ireland	Men's			13		2013, 2015, 2017	2014	None	Europe	
NOR	Norway				0				None	Europe	
NZL	New Zealand	Men's			44=					Oceania	
PER	Peru	Men's	2017		37=					America	
POR	Portugal (FPDD)	Men's			44=	1984, 1992, 1996, 2000	1986, 2001, 2013, 2015, 2017	1999, 2002, 2014	2010, 2011, 2012, 2013, 2014, 2015, 2016, 2017	Europe	
RSA	South Africa (SASPD)	Men's			0		2005, 2007		2010, 2011, 2012, 2013, 2014, 2015, 2016, 2017	Africa	
RUS	Russia (RCPFF)	Men's		OOC	2	1996, 2000, 2004, 2008, 2012	1998, 2001, 2003, 2005, 2007, 2009, 2011, 2013, 2015, 2017	1995, 1999, 2002, 2006, 2010, 2014	2010, 2011, 2012, 2013, 2014, 2015, 2016, 2017	Europe	
SCO	Scotland (SDS)	Men's	1978		9		2001, 2007, 2009, 2011, 2013, 2015	2006, 2010, 2014	None	Europe	
SIN	Singapore	Men's			44=			2014, 2014*, 2015, 2017	2010, 2011, 2012, 2013, 2014, 2015, 2016, 2017	Asia (Southeast)	
SLV	El Salvador	Men's	2017		44=					America	
THA	Thailand	Men's			0			2014, 2015, 2017	2014, 2015, 2016, 2017	Asia (Southeast)	
TUN	Tunisia	Men's			44=				2014, 2015, 2016, 2017	Africa	
TUR	Turkey				0				None	Europe	
UAE	United Arab Emirates (U.A.E.NPC)	Men's			0				None	Asia	
UKR	Ukraine (NPC Ukraine)	Men's		OOC	1	2000, 2004, 2008, 2012, 2016	1998, 2001, 2003, 2005, 2007, 2009, 2011, 2013, 2015, 2017	1999, 2002, 2006, 2010, 2014	2010, 2011, 2012, 2013, 2014, 2015, 2016, 2017	Europe	
USA	United States	Men's			8	1984, 1992, 1996, 2004, 2012, 2016	1990, 1998, 2001, 2003, 2005, 2007, 2009, 2011, 2013, 2015, 2017	1995, 1999, 2002, 2007, 2010, 2014, 2015	None	America	
VEN	Venezuela (FEVEDE-PC)	Men's			15		2013, 2015, 2017	2007, 2010, 2014, 2015	2010, 2011, 2012, 2013, 2014, 2015, 2016, 2017	America	
VNM	Vietnam	Men's	2017		0					Asia	
WAL	Wales (FAW Trust)	Men's	Jan. 2015		0				None	Europe	

== See also ==
- World Abilitysport
