= Andriy Tsukanov =

Ukrainian Paralympic footballer

Personal information
- Nationality: Ukrainian
- Born: 28 November 1980 (age 45)
Medal record
Men's 7-a-side football
Representing Ukraine
Paralympic Games
Gold medal – first place	2004 Athens	Team
Gold medal – first place	2008 Beijing	Team
Silver medal – second place	2000 Sydney	Team
World Championships
Gold medal – first place	2001 England	Team
Gold medal – first place	2003 Argentina	Team
Gold medal – first place	2009 Netherlands	Team
Silver medal – second place	1998 Brazil	Team
Silver medal – second place	2005 United States	Team
Bronze medal – third place	2007 Brazil	Team
Bronze medal – third place	2011 Netherlands	Team
European Championships
Gold medal – first place	1999 Belgium	Team
Gold medal – first place	2002 Ukraine	Team
Gold medal – first place	2006 Ireland	Team
Gold medal – first place	2010 Scotland	Team

Andriy Tsukanov Ukrainian: Андрій Цуканов; born 28 November 1980) is a Ukrainian Paralympic footballer who won a gold medal at the 2008 Summer Paralympics in China.
