= IFCPF European Championships =

The IFCPF European Championships are the continental championships in CP football, organized by the International Federation of CP Football (IFCPF).

== Results ==
Year	Host	Winner	Score	Runner-up	Third place	Score	Fourth place	Number of teams	Ref.
CPISRA tournaments
1985; Details	(Scotland); Glasgow (ESC)	no information available			no information available				
1991; Details	(England); Nottingham (ESC)	Netherlands	3–0	England	(Republic of Ireland) / Ireland France	^{EU1}	(Republic of Ireland) / Ireland France	4	
1995; Details	(England); Nottingham (ESC)	Netherlands	0–0(a.e.t.) (– p.)	Russia	/ (Republic of Ireland); England Ireland	^{EU1}	/ (Republic of Ireland); England Ireland	7(8)	
1999; Details	(Belgium); Brasschaat (ESC)	Ukraine	4–2	Netherlands	Russia		Portugal	9(10)	
2002; Details	(Ukraine); Kyiv (ESC)	Ukraine	6–1	Russia	Netherlands	1–0	Portugal	7	
2006; Details	(Republic of Ireland); Dublin (EC)	Ukraine	5–2	Russia	Netherlands	2–1	(Republic of Ireland); Ireland	8	
2010; Details	(Scotland); Glasgow (EC)	Ukraine	1–1 (a.e.t.) (8–7p)	Russia	(Republic of Ireland); Ireland	2–0	Netherlands	10	
2014; Details	(Portugal); Maia (EC)	Ukraine	3–0	Netherlands	Russia	3–0	(Republic of Ireland); Ireland	11	
IFCPF tournaments
2018; Details	(Netherlands); Zeist (EC)	Russia	3–2	Ukraine	(Republic of Ireland); Ireland	2–1	Netherlands	12	
2023; Details	(Italy); Oristano (EC)	Ukraine	3–0	England	Spain	4–0	(Republic of Ireland); Ireland	8	

== Medal table ==
Rank	Nation	Gold	Silver	Bronze	Total
1	Ukraine (UKR)	6	1	0	7
2	Netherlands (NED)	2	2	2	6
3	Russia (RUS)	1	4	2	7
4	England (ENG)	0	2	0	2
5	Ireland (IRL)	0	0	2	2
6	Spain (ESP)	0	0	1	1
Totals (6 entries)		9	9	7	25
