= Football at the Cerebral Palsy Games =

Football at the Cerebral Palsy Games is an event of CP football at the Cerebral Palsy Games.

Cerebral Palsy Football, also called 7-a-side football or formerly Paralympic Football, is an adaptation of association football for athletes with cerebral palsy and other neurological disorders, including stroke and traumatic brain injury.

Football at the Cerebral Palsy Games also counted as World Championship.

== History ==
1. 1972 - 1980 (Not in Games Program)
2. 1982 - 2005 (Was played in 5 Editions)
3. 2005 - 2014 (Games was not held)
4. 2015 and 2018 : Was played in U19
5. 2018 - 2022 (Games was not held)
6. 2023 - Ongoing : Merge With IWAS = Abilitysport

== Results ==
Year	Host	Winner	Score	Runner-up	Third place	Score	Fourth place	Number of teams	Ref.
1982; Details	(Denmark); Greve (CPG)	(Republic of Ireland); Ireland	2–0	Netherlands	Belgium	no information available^{2}		8	
1986; Details	(Belgium); Gits (CPG)	Netherlands	3–0	Belgium	(Republic of Ireland); Ireland	^{3}	Portugal	6	
1997; Details	(Netherlands); Delden (CPG)	Russia							
2001; Details	(England); Nottingham (CPG)	Ukraine	3–1	Russia	Brazil	2–0	Iran	13	
2005; Details	(United States); New London (CPG)	Ukraine	no score found	Russia	Iran	9–0	Netherlands	13	
