= IFCPF Asia-Oceania Championships =

The IFCPF Asia-Oceania Championships are the continental competitions in CP football.

== Results ==
=== Men ===
Year	Host	Winner	Score	Runner-up	Third place	Score	Fourth place	Teams	Ref.
FESPIC Games
2002; Details	(South Korea); Busan (FG)	South Korea	Round Robin	Malaysia	Japan			3	
2006; Details	(Malaysia); Kuala Lumpur (FG)	Iran	5–0	Australia	China	4–0	Japan	6	
Asian Para Games
2010; Details	(China); Guangzhou (AsianG)	Iran	7–0	China	Japan	2–0	South Korea	4	
2014; Details	(South Korea); Incheon (AsianG)	Iran	5–0	Japan	South Korea	3–0	Singapore	4	
IFCPF tournaments
2018; Details	(Iran); Kish Island (AOC)	Iran	^{AS1}	Australia	Jordan	^{AS1}	Thailand	5	
2023; Details	(Australia); Melbourne (AOC)	Iran	2–0	Australia	Japan	3–0	Thailand	5	
2025; Details	(Indonesia); Surakarta (AOC)	Iran	2–0	Indonesia	Australia	2–2 AET (3-1 P)	Thailand	7	

=== Women ===
Year	Host	Winner	Score	Runner-up	Third place	Score	Fourth place	Teams	Ref.
2023; Details	(Australia); Melbourne (AOC)	Australia	Round Robin	Japan	Nepal	-	-	3	

== Medals ==
=== Men ===
Rank	Nation	Gold	Silver	Bronze	Total
1	Iran (IRI)	3	0	0	3
2	Australia (AUS)	0	2	1	3
3	Indonesia (INA)	0	1	0	1
4	Japan (JPN)	0	0	1	1
4	Jordan (JOR)	0	0	1	1
Totals (5 entries)		3	3	3	9

=== Women ===
Rank	Nation	Gold	Silver	Bronze	Total
1	Australia (AUS)	1	0	0	1
2	Japan (JPN)	0	1	0	1
3	Nepal (NEP)	0	0	1	1
Totals (3 entries)		1	1	1	3
