= Soccer World Cup at the 2005 CPISRA World Championships =

Tournament details
- Host country: United States
- Dates: 27 June – 11 July 2005
- Teams: 13
- Venue: 1 (in 1 host city)

Final positions
- Champions: Ukraine
- Runners-up: Russia
- Third place: Iran
- Fourth place: Netherlands

Football 7-a-side at the 2005 CPISRA World Games was held in New London, Connecticut from 27 June to 11 July. Football 7-a-side is played by athletes with cerebral palsy, a condition characterized by impairment of muscular coordination, stroke, or traumatic brain injury (TBI).

Football 7-a-side was played with modified FIFA rules. Among the modifications were that there were seven players, no offside, a smaller playing field, and permission for one-handed throw-ins. Matches consisted of two thirty-minute halves, with a fifteen-minute half-time break.

== Participating teams and officials ==
=== Qualifying ===
The following teams qualified for the tournament:

Means of qualification	Date	Venue	Berths	Qualified
Host nation			1	United States
Africa Region			1	South Africa
2002 Pan-American Soccer Championship	22 – 29 September 2002	Santiago, Chile	2	Argentina; Canada
2002 FESPIC Games	26 October – 1 November 2002	Busan, South Korea	2	Iran; Japan
2002 European Soccer Championship	30 August – 8 September 2002	Kyiv, Ukraine	6	England (Republic of Ireland) Ireland; Netherlands; Russia; Spain; Ukraine
Oceania Region			1	Australia
Total			13	

== Venues ==
The venues to be used for the World Championships were located in New London, Connecticut.

New London	Soccer World Cup at the 2005 CPISRA World Championships is located in the United States
Stadium: unknown	Soccer World Cup at the 2005 CPISRA World Championships is located in the United States
Capacity: unknown	Soccer World Cup at the 2005 CPISRA World Championships is located in the United States

== First group stage ==
=== Group 1 ===
Pos	Team	Pld	W	D	L	GF	GA	GD	Pts	Qualified for
1	Russia	0	0	0	0	0	0	0	0	Team play for the position 1 - 8
2	United States	0	0	0	0	0	0	0	0	Team play for the position 1 - 8
3	Canada	0	0	0	0	0	0	0	0	Team play for the position 9 - 13

Source: no more detailed information about the table stand available
Rules for classification: Tie-breaking criteria
30 June 2015

USA (United States)	0–0	Canada
	Report

1 July 2015

Canada	–	Russia
	Report

Russia	–	United States

=== Group 2 ===
Pos	Team	Pld	W	D	L	GF	GA	GD	Pts	Qualified for
1	Iran	0	0	0	0	0	0	0	0	Team play for the position 1 - 8
2	Netherlands	0	0	0	0	0	0	0	0	Team play for the position 1 - 8
3	Australia	0	0	0	0	0	0	0	0	Team play for the position 9 - 13

Source: no more detailed information about the table stand available
Rules for classification: Tie-breaking criteria
1 July 2005

Iran	1–0	Netherlands
	Report

Australia	–	Iran

3 July 2005

Netherlands	2–0	Australia
	Report

=== Group 3 ===
Pos	Team	Pld	W	D	L	GF	GA	GD	Pts	Qualified for
1	Ukraine	0	0	0	0	0	0	0	0	Team play for the position 1 - 8
2	England	0	0	0	0	0	0	0	0	Team play for the position 1 - 8
3	Spain*	0	0	0	0	0	0	0	0	Team play for the position 9 - 13
4	South Africa*	0	0	0	0	0	0	0	0	Team play for the position 9 - 13

Source: no more detailed information about the table stand available
The teams with * the placement is presumed due to the available results.
Rules for classification: Tie-breaking criteria

Ukraine	13–1	South Africa
	Report

England	–	Spain

Ukraine	7–0	England
	Report

Spain	–	South Africa

Ukraine	12–0	Spain
	Report

England	–	South Africa

=== Group 4 ===
Pos	Team	Pld	W	D	L	GF	GA	GD	Pts	Qualified for
1	Argentina	0	0	0	0	0	0	0	0	Team play for the position 1 - 8
2	(Republic of Ireland) Ireland	0	0	0	0	0	0	0	0	Team play for the position 1 - 8
3	Japan	0	0	0	0	0	0	0	0	Team play for the position 9 - 13

Source: no more detailed information about the table stand available
Rules for classification: Tie-breaking criteria

–

–

–

== Second group stage ==
=== Group 5 ===
Pos	Team	Pld	W	D	L	GF	GA	GD	Pts	Qualified for
1	Russia	0	0	0	0	0	0	0	0	Team play for the position 1
2	Netherlands	0	0	0	0	0	0	0	0	Team play for the position 3
3	Argentina*	0	0	0	0	0	0	0	0	Team play for the position 5
4	England*	0	0	0	0	0	0	0	0	Team play for the position 7

Source: no more detailed information about the table stand available
The teams with * the placement is presumed due to the available results.
Rules for classification: Tie-breaking criteria
5 July 2005

Russia	4–1	Netherlands
	Report

Argentina	–	England

7 July 2005

Netherlands	7–3	England
	Report

Russia	–	Argentina

8 July 2005

Netherlands	5–0	Argentina
	Report

Russia	–	England

=== Group 6 ===
Pos	Team	Pld	W	D	L	GF	GA	GD	Pts	Qualified for
1	Ukraine	0	0	0	0	0	0	0	0	Team play for the position 1
2	Iran	0	0	0	0	0	0	0	0	Team play for the position 3
3	(Republic of Ireland) Ireland*	0	0	0	0	0	0	0	0	Team play for the position 5
4	United States*	0	0	0	0	0	0	0	0	Team play for the position 7

Source: no more detailed information about the table stand available
The teams with * the placement is presumed due to the available results.
Rules for classification: Tie-breaking criteria

Ukraine	4–0	(Republic of Ireland) Ireland
	Report

Iran	–	United States

Ukraine	10–0	United States
	Report

Iran	–	(Republic of Ireland) Ireland

Ukraine	3–0	Iran
	Report

Ireland (Republic of Ireland)	–	United States

=== Group 7 ===
Pos	Team	Pld	W	D	L	GF	GA	GD	Pts	Position
1	Spain*	0	0	0	0	0	0	0	0	position 9
2	Australia*	0	0	0	0	0	0	0	0	position 10
3	Canada*	0	0	0	0	0	0	0	0	position 11
4	Japan*	0	0	0	0	0	0	0	0	position 12
5	South Africa*	0	0	0	0	0	0	0	0	position 13

Source: no more detailed information about the table stand available
The teams with * the placement is presumed due to the available results.
Rules for classification: Tie-breaking criteria
4 June 2005

Canada	–	Australia
	Report

–

6 June 2005

Canada	–	South Africa
	Report

–

–

–

8 June 2005

Canada	–	Spain
	Report

–

10 June 2005

Canada	–	Japan
	Report

–

== Finals ==
Position 7-8

10 July 2005

–

Position 5-6

10 July 2005

–

Position 3-4

10 July 2005

Iran	9–0	Netherlands
	Report

Final

10 July 2005

Russia	0–3	Ukraine
	Report	Volodymyr Antoniuk, Taras Dutko - 2

== Statistics ==
=== Ranking ===
Rank	Team
Gold medal	Ukraine
Silver medal	Russia
Bronze medal	Iran
4.	Netherlands
5.	
6.	
7.	
8.	
9.	
10.	
11.	
12.	
13.	
