= 2007 CPISRA Football 7-a-side World Championships =

Tournament details
- Host country: Brazil
- Dates: 5 – 18 November 2007
- Teams: 16

Final positions
- Champions: Russia
- Runners-up: Iran
- Third place: Ukraine
- Fourth place: Brazil

Tournament statistics
- Matches played: 44
- Goals scored: 274 (6.23 per match)
- Top scorer: (Brazil) Luciano Rocha (8)

The 2007 CPISRA Football 7-a-side World Championships was the world championship for men's national 7-a-side association football teams. CPISRA stands for Cerebral Palsy International Sports & Recreation Association. Athletes with a physical disability competed. The Championship took place in Brazil from 5 November to 18 November 2007.

Football 7-a-side was played with modified FIFA rules. Among the modifications were that there were seven players, no offside, a smaller playing field, and permission for one-handed throw-ins. Matches consisted of two thirty-minute halves, with a fifteen-minute half-time break. The Championships was a qualifying event for the Beijing 2008 Paralympic Games.

== Participating teams and officials ==
=== Qualifying ===
The following teams are qualified for the tournament:

Means of qualification	Date	Venue	Berths	Qualified
Host nation			1	Brazil
African Region			1	South Africa
2007 ParaPan American Games	13 August – 19 August 2007	Rio de Janeiro, Brazil	3	Argentina; Canada; United States
2006 FESPIC Games	25 November – 1 December 2006	Kuala Lumpur, Malaysia	3	China; Iran; Japan
2006 European Championships	21 – 28 July 2006	(Republic of Ireland) Dublin, Ireland	7	Netherlands; England & Wales (Republic of Ireland) Ireland; Spain; Russia; Scotland; Ukraine
Oceania Region			1	Australia
Total			16	

=== The draw ===
During the draw, the teams were divided into pots because of rankings. Here, the following groups:

	Group A	Group B	Group C	Group D
Pot 1	Iran	Brazil	Ukraine	Russia
Pot 2	Netherlands	Australia	(Republic of Ireland) Ireland	Argentina
Pot 3	Spain	England & Wales	Canada	China
Pot 4	United States	South Africa	Japan	Scotland

== Venues ==
The venues to be used for the World Championships were located in Deodoro, Rio de Janeiro.

Deodoro, Rio de Janeiro	2007 CPISRA Football 7-a-side World Championships is located in Brazil
Deodoro Sports Complex	2007 CPISRA Football 7-a-side World Championships is located in Brazil
Capacity: unknown	2007 CPISRA Football 7-a-side World Championships is located in Brazil

== Format ==
The first round, or group stage, was a competition between the 16 teams divided among four groups of four, where each group engaged in a round-robin tournament within itself. The two highest ranked teams in each group advanced to the knockout stage for the position one to eight. the two lower ranked teams plays for the positions nine to 16. Teams were awarded three points for a win and one for a draw. When comparing teams in a group over-all result came before head-to-head.

Tie-breaking criteria for group play
The ranking of teams in each group was based on the following criteria:
1. Number of points
2. Goal difference
3. Number of goals scored
4. Number of points obtained in matches between tied teams
5. Goal difference in matches between tied teams
6. Number of goals scored in matches between tied teams
7. Drawing of lots

In the knockout stage there were three rounds (quarter-finals, semi-finals, and the final). The winners plays for the higher positions, the losers for the lower positions. For any match in the knockout stage, a draw after 60 minutes of regulation time was followed by two 10 minute periods of extra time to determine a winner. If the teams were still tied, a penalty shoot-out was held to determine a winner.

Classification
Athletes with a physical disability competed. The athlete's disability was caused by a non-progressive brain damage that affects motor control, such as cerebral palsy, traumatic brain injury or stroke. Athletes must be ambulant.

Players were classified by level of disability.

- C5: Athletes with difficulties when walking and running, but not in standing or when kicking the ball.
- C6: Athletes with control and co-ordination problems of their upper limbs, especially when running.
- C7: Athletes with hemiplegia.
- C8: Athletes with minimal disability; must meet eligibility criteria and have an impairment that has impact on the sport of football.

Teams must field at least one class C5 or C6 player at all times. No more than two players of class C8 are permitted to play at the same time.

== Group stage ==
The first round, or group stage, have seen the sixteen teams divided into four groups of four teams. In any every match a maximum of 10 goals scored were counted. This is indicated with an asterisk (*).

=== Group A ===
Pos	Team	Pld	W	D	L	GF	GA	GD	Pts	Qualified for
1	Iran	3	3	0	0	7	2	+5	9	Team play for the position 1 - 8
2	Netherlands	3	2	0	1	6	2	+4	6	Team play for the position 1 - 8
3	United States	3	1	0	2	4	6	−2	3	Team play for the position 9 - 16
4	Spain	3	0	0	3	0	7	−7	0	Team play for the position 9 - 16

Source: 2007 CPISRA Football 7-a-side World Championships
Rules for classification: Tie-breaking criteria
5 November 2007
9:00

Iran	2–0	Spain

Deodoro Sports Complex, Field 1
5 November 2007
11:00

Netherlands	3–0	United States
	Report

Deodoro Sports Complex, Field 1
7 November 2007
9:00

Iran	3–1	United States
		Marthell Vazquez

Deodoro Sports Complex, Field 1
7 November 2007
11:00

Netherlands	2–0	Spain
	Report

Deodoro Sports Complex, Field 1
9 November 2007
9:00

Iran	2–1	Netherlands
	Report

Deodoro Sports Complex, Field 1
9 November 2007
11:00

Spain	0–3	United States
		Derek Arneaud; Josh McKinney; Shaun Schetka

Deodoro Sports Complex, Field 1

=== Group B ===
Pos	Team	Pld	W	D	L	GF	GA	GD	Pts	Qualified for
1	Brazil	3	3	0	0	20	3	+17	9	Team play for the position 1 - 8
2	England & Wales	3	2	0	1	10	5	+5	6	Team play for the position 1 - 8
3	Australia	3	1	0	2	4	8	−4	3	Team play for the position 9 - 16
4	South Africa	3	0	0	3	0	18	−18	0	Team play for the position 9 - 16

Source: 2007 CPISRA Football 7-a-side World Championships
Rules for classification: Tie-breaking criteria
5 November 2007
14:00

Brazil	5–3	England & Wales

Deodoro Sports Complex, Field 1
5 November 2007
16:00

Australia	4–0	South Africa

Deodoro Sports Complex, Field 1
7 November 2007
14:00

Brazil	10–0	South Africa

Deodoro Sports Complex, Field 1
7 November 2007
16:00

Australia	0–3	England & Wales

Deodoro Sports Complex, Field 1
9 November 2007
14:00

Brazil	5–0	Australia

Deodoro Sports Complex, Field 1
9 November 2007
16:00

England & Wales	4–0	South Africa

Deodoro Sports Complex, Field 1

=== Group C ===
Pos	Team	Pld	W	D	L	GF	GA	GD	Pts	Qualified for
1	Ukraine	3	3	0	0	19	0	+19	9	Team play for the position 1 - 8
2	(Republic of Ireland) Ireland	3	2	0	1	12	5	+7	6	Team play for the position 1 - 8
3	Canada	3	1	0	2	2	9	−7	3	Team play for the position 9 - 16
4	Japan	3	0	0	3	1	20	−19	0	Team play for the position 9 - 16

Source: 2007 CPISRA Football 7-a-side World Championships
Rules for classification: Tie-breaking criteria
6 November 2007
9:00

Ukraine	7–0	Canada
	Report

Deodoro Sports Complex, Field 1
6 November 2007
11:00

Ireland (Republic of Ireland)	10–1	Japan

Deodoro Sports Complex, Field 1
8 November 2007
9:00

Ukraine	8–0	Japan
	Report

Deodoro Sports Complex, Field 1
8 November 2007
11:00

Ireland (Republic of Ireland)	2–0	Canada

Deodoro Sports Complex, Field 1
10 November 2007
9:00

Ukraine	4–0	(Republic of Ireland) Ireland
	Report

Deodoro Sports Complex, Field 1
10 November 2007
11:00

Canada	2–0	Japan

Deodoro Sports Complex, Field 1

=== Group D ===
Pos	Team	Pld	W	D	L	GF	GA	GD	Pts	Qualified for
1	Russia	2	2	0	0	11	0	+11	6	Team play for the position 1 - 8
2	Scotland	2	1	0	1	2	7	−5	3	Team play for the position 1 - 8
3	Argentina	2	0	0	2	1	7	−6	0	Team play for the position 9 - 16
4	China	0	0	0	0	0	0	0	0	Team play for the position 9 - 16

Source: 2007 CPISRA Football 7-a-side World Championships
Rules for classification: Tie-breaking criteria
6 November 2007
14:00

Russia	–	China

Deodoro Sports Complex, Field 1
6 November 2007
16:00

Argentina	1–2	Scotland

Deodoro Sports Complex, Field 1
8 November 2007
14:00

Russia	6–0	Scotland

Deodoro Sports Complex, Field 1
8 November 2007
16:00

Argentina	–	China

Deodoro Sports Complex, Field 1
10 November 2007
14:00

Russia	5–0	Argentina

Deodoro Sports Complex, Field 1
10 November 2007
16:00

China	–	Scotland

Deodoro Sports Complex, Field 1

== Knockout stage ==
=== Quarter-finals ===
Position 9-16

12 November 2007
9:00

United States	2–1	China
Marthell Vazquez; Shaun Schetka

Deodoro Sports Complex, Field 1

12 November 2007
11:00

Australia	8–1	Japan

Deodoro Sports Complex, Field 1

12 November 2007
14:00

Canada	7–1	South Africa

Deodoro Sports Complex, Field 1

12 November 2007
16:00

Argentina	6–0	Spain

Deodoro Sports Complex, Field 1

Position 1-8

13 November 2007
9:00

Iran	6–0	Scotland

Deodoro Sports Complex, Field 1

13 November 2007
11:00

Brazil	5–0	(Republic of Ireland) Ireland

Deodoro Sports Complex, Field 1

13 November 2007
14:00

Ukraine	4–0	England & Wales
	Report

Deodoro Sports Complex, Field 1

13 November 2007
16:00

Russia	4–0	Netherlands
	Report

Deodoro Sports Complex, Field 1

=== Semi-finals ===
Position 13-16

14 November 2007
9:00

South Africa	5–0	Spain

Deodoro Sports Complex, Field 1

14 November 2007
16:00

China	?–?	Japan

Deodoro Sports Complex, Field 1

Position 9-12

14 November 2007
11:00

United States	2–1	Australia
Marthell Vazquez; Marthell Vazquez

Deodoro Sports Complex, Field 1

14 November 2007
14:00

Canada	0–3	Argentina

Deodoro Sports Complex, Field 1

Position 5-8

15 November 2007
9:00

Scotland	2–2 (pen. 3-2)	(Republic of Ireland) Ireland

Deodoro Sports Complex, Field 1

15 November 2007
11:00

England & Wales	1–3	Netherlands
	Report

Deodoro Sports Complex, Field 1

Position 1-4

15 November 2007
14:00

Iran	5–4	Brazil

Deodoro Sports Complex, Field 1

15 November 2007
16:00

Ukraine	1–1 (pen. 7-8)	Russia
	Report

Deodoro Sports Complex, Field 1

== Finals ==
Position 15-16

16 November 2007
16:00

China	1–1	Spain

Deodoro Sports Complex, Field 1

Position 13-14

16 November 2007
9:00

Japan	2–0	South Africa

Deodoro Sports Complex, Field 1

Position 11-12

16 November 2007
11:00

Australia	5–2	Canada

Deodoro Sports Complex, Field 1

Position 9-10

16 November 2007
14:00

United States	0–1	Argentina

Deodoro Sports Complex, Field 1

Position 7-8

17 November 2007
9:00

Ireland (Republic of Ireland)	2–3	England & Wales

Deodoro Sports Complex, Field 1

Position 5-6

17 November 2007
11:00

Scotland	0–3	Netherlands
	Report

Deodoro Sports Complex, Field 1

Position 3-4

17 November 2007
14:00

Brazil	0–2	Ukraine
	Report

Deodoro Sports Complex, Field 1

Final

17 November 2007
16:00

Iran	1–2	Russia

Deodoro Sports Complex, Field 1

== Statistics ==
=== Goalscorers ===
8 goals

- (Brazil) Luciano Rocha

7 goals

- (Ukraine) Taras Dutko

6 goals

- (Australia) David Cantoni
- (Iran) Abdolreza Karimizadeh
- (England) Wayne Ward

5 Goals

- (Brazil) Jose Carlos Guimaraes

4 goals

- (Republic of Ireland) Finbarr O'riordan
- (Ukraine) Denys Ponomaryov
- (Ukraine) Ivan Shkvarlo
- (Canada) Sefik Smajlovic
- (United States) Marthell Vazquez

3 goals

- (Australia) David Barber
- (Russia) Pavel Borisov
- (Brazil) Fabiano Bruzzi
- (Russia) Mamuka Dzimistarishvili
- (Republic of Ireland) Luke Evans
- (Argentina) Sebastian Garcia
- (Russia) Andrey Kuvaev
- (Netherlands) Stephan Lokhoff
- (Brazil) Wanderson Oliveira
- (Brazil) Flavio Pereira
- (Australia) Christopher Pyne
- (South Africa) Christo Titus

2 goals

- (Iran) Moslem Akibari
- (England) Michael Barker
- (Canada) Matthew Brown
- (Republic of Ireland) Paul Dollard
- (Ukraine) Olexiy Hetun
- (Ukraine) Volodymyr Kabanov
- (Iran) Houshang Khosravani
- (Russia) Stanislav Kolykhalov
- (South Africa) Thozamile Lurane
- (Brazil) Leandro Marinho
- (Republic of Ireland) Gary Messett
- (Iran) Atashafrouz Rasoul
- (Brazil) Jean Rodrigues
- (Argentina) Marcos Salazar
- (United States) Shaun Schetka
- (Russia) Alexey Tchesmine
- (Ukraine) Vitaliy Trushev
- (China) Fang Wan
- (China) Xu Zhu

1 goal

- (England) Taylor Andrew
- (Iran) Bahman Ansari
- (United States) Derek Arneaud
- (Brazil) Pedro Gonçalves
- (Canada) Dustin Hodgson
- (Brazil) Renato Lima
- (Russia) Andrey Lovetchnikov
- (United States) Josh Mckinney
- (Argentina) Mariano Morana
- (Argentina) Claudio Morinigo
- (South Africa) Malito Nxumalo
- (Republic of Ireland) Alan O'hara
- (Scotland) Graeme Paterson
- (Scotland) Jonathan Paterson
- (Canada) Todd Phillips
- (Russia) Ivan Potekhin
- (England) Fox Richard
- (Netherlands) Johannes Swinkels
- (Ukraine) Andriy Tsukanov
- (Ukraine) Sergiy Vakulenko
- (Netherlands) Hendrikus Van Kempen
- (China) Guojun Xu, Guojun
- (China) Lang Yunlong
- (Japan) Ryuta Yoshino

=== Ranking ===
Rank	Team
Gold medal	Russia
Silver medal	Iran
Bronze medal	Ukraine
4.	Brazil
5.	Netherlands
6.	Scotland
7.	England & Wales
8.	(Republic of Ireland) Ireland
9.	Argentina
10.	United States
11.	Australia
12.	Canada
13.	Japan
14.	South Africa
15.	China
15.	Spain
