= Soccer World Cup at the 2001 CPISRA World Games =

Tournament details
- Host country: England
- Dates: 19 – 28 July 2001
- Teams: 13
- Venue: 1 (in 1 host city)

Final positions
- Champions: Ukraine
- Runners-up: Russia
- Third place: Brazil
- Fourth place: Iran

Tournament statistics
- Matches played: 42
- Goals scored: 220 (5.24 per match)

Football 7-a-side at the 2001 CPISRA World Games was held in Nottingham at the Harvey Hadden Stadium from 19 July to 28 July. Football 7-a-side is played by athletes with cerebral palsy, a condition characterized by impairment of muscular coordination, stroke, or traumatic brain injury (TBI).

Football 7-a-side was played with modified FIFA rules. Among the modifications were that there were seven players, no offside, a smaller playing field, and permission for one-handed throw-ins. Matches consisted of two thirty-minute halves, with a fifteen-minute half-time break.

== Participating teams and officials ==
=== Qualifying ===
The following teams are qualified for the tournament:

Means of qualification	Date	Venue	Berths	Qualified
Host nation			1	England & Wales
1999 Pan-American Soccer Championship	unknown	Argentina	2	Brazil; United States
Asian Region			1	Iran
1999 European Soccer Championship	24 June – 1 July 1999	Brasschaat, Belgium	8	Belgium (Republic of Ireland) Ireland; Netherlands; Portugal; Russia; Scotland; Spain; Ukraine
Oceania Region			1	Australia
Total			13	

== Venues ==
The venues to be used for the World Championships were located in Nottingham.

Nottingham	Soccer World Cup at the 2001 CPISRA World Games is located in England
Harvey Hadden Stadium	Soccer World Cup at the 2001 CPISRA World Games is located in England
Capacity: unknown	Soccer World Cup at the 2001 CPISRA World Games is located in England

== Format ==
The first round, the first group stage, was a competition between the 13 teams divided among the groups of three and one group of four, where each group engaged in a round-robin tournament within itself. The two highest ranked teams in each group advanced to the second group stage for the position one to eight. the last team(s) plays for the positions nine to 13. Teams were awarded three points for a win and one for a draw. When comparing teams in a group over-all result came before head-to-head.

Tie-breaking criteria for group play
The ranking of teams in each group was based on the following criteria:
1. Number of points
2. Goal difference
3. Number of goals scored
4. Number of points obtained in matches between tied teams
5. Goal difference in matches between tied teams
6. Number of goals scored in matches between tied teams
7. Drawing of lots

In the second round, the second group stage, the two groups, each with four teams, fighting for the positions one to eight, the first placed of the two groups played in the finals around the victory of the tournament, the second place around the third place, the third place around the fifth place and the last plays around the seventh place. The five last placed, one from group 1, group 3 and group 4 and two from group 2 plays everyone against everyone. The first placed is the ninth of the tournament, the second-place finishes the tenth, the third-place finishes the eleventh, the fourth place the twelfth and the fifth place the thirteenth. For any match in the finals, a draw after 60 minutes of regulation time was followed by two 10 minute periods of extra time to determine a winner. If the teams were still tied, a penalty shoot-out was held to determine a winner.

Classification
Athletes with a physical disability competed. The athlete's disability was caused by a non-progressive brain damage that affects motor control, such as cerebral palsy, traumatic brain injury or stroke. Athletes must be ambulant.

Players were classified by level of disability.

- C5: Athletes with difficulties when walking and running, but not in standing or when kicking the ball.
- C6: Athletes with control and co-ordination problems of their upper limbs, especially when running.
- C7: Athletes with hemiplegia.
- C8: Athletes with minimal disability; must meet eligibility criteria and have an impairment that has impact on the sport of football.

Teams must field at least one class C5 or C6 player at all times. No more than two players of class C8 are permitted to play at the same time.

== First group stage ==
The first group stage have seen the 13 teams divided into four groups of four teams.

=== Group 1 ===
Pos	Team	Pld	W	D	L	GF	GA	GD	Pts	Qualified for
1	Russia	2	2	0	0	10	0	+10	6	Team play for the position 1 - 8
2	Netherlands	2	1	0	1	4	3	+1	3	Team play for the position 1 - 8
3	(Republic of Ireland) Ireland	2	0	0	2	0	11	−11	0	Team play for the position 9 - 13

Source: CP-ISRA World Games 2001 - Football CP World Cup results
Rules for classification: Tie-breaking criteria

(Republic of Ireland) Ireland	0–7	Russia

21 July 2001

Netherlands	4–0	(Republic of Ireland) Ireland

22 July 2001

Russia	3–0	Netherlands

=== Group 2 ===
Pos	Team	Pld	W	D	L	GF	GA	GD	Pts	Qualified for
1	Ukraine	3	3	0	0	23	2	+21	9	Team play for the position 1 - 8
2	Australia	3	2	0	1	7	4	+3	6	Team play for the position 1 - 8
3	Belgium	3	1	0	2	3	14	−11	3	Team play for the position 9 - 13
4	Scotland	3	0	0	3	1	14	−13	0	Team play for the position 9 - 13

Source: CP-ISRA World Games 2001 - Football CP World Cup results
Rules for classification: Tie-breaking criteria

Australia	2–0	Scotland

Ukraine	9–1	Belgium

Scotland	0–13	Ukraine

Belgium	0–4	Australia

Scotland	1–2	Belgium

Ukraine	4–1	Australia

=== Group 3 ===
Pos	Team	Pld	W	D	L	GF	GA	GD	Pts	Qualified for
1	Brazil	2	2	0	0	9	0	+9	6	Team play for the position 1 - 8
2	England & Wales	2	0	1	1	0	2	−2	1	Team play for the position 1 - 8
3	Spain	2	0	1	1	0	7	−7	1	Team play for the position 9 - 13

Source: CP-ISRA World Games 2001 - Football CP World Cup results
Rules for classification: Tie-breaking criteria

Spain	0–7	Brazil

England & Wales	0–0	Spain

Brazil	2–0	England & Wales

=== Group 4 ===
Pos	Team	Pld	W	D	L	GF	GA	GD	Pts	Qualified for
1	Iran	2	2	0	0	12	0	+12	6	Team play for the position 1 - 8
2	United States	2	0	1	1	0	4	−4	1	Team play for the position 1 - 8
3	Portugal	2	0	1	1	0	10	−10	1	Team play for the position 9 - 13

Source: CP-ISRA World Games 2001 - Football CP World Cup results
Rules for classification: Tie-breaking criteria

Portugal	0–14	Iran

United States	0–0	Portugal

Iran	2–0	United States

== Second group stage ==
The second group stage have seen the 13 teams divided into four groups of four teams.

=== Group 5 ===
Pos	Team	Pld	W	D	L	GF	GA	GD	Pts	Qualified for
1	Russia	3	3	0	0	18	4	+14	9	Team play for the position 1
2	Iran	3	1	1	1	12	5	+7	4	Team play for the position 3
3	Australia	3	1	1	1	4	4	0	4	Team play for the position 5
4	England & Wales	3	0	0	3	1	22	−21	0	Team play for the position 7

Source: CP-ISRA World Games 2001 - Football CP World Cup results
Rules for classification: Tie-breaking criteria

Iran	14–0	England & Wales

Russia	3–2	Australia

England & Wales	0–13	Russia

Australia	0–0	Iran

England & Wales	1–2	Australia

Russia	5–2	Iran

=== Group 6 ===
Pos	Team	Pld	W	D	L	GF	GA	GD	Pts	Qualified for
1	Ukraine	3	3	0	0	13	2	+11	9	Team play for the position 1
2	Brazil	3	2	0	1	7	5	+2	6	Team play for the position 3
3	United States	3	1	0	2	6	8	−2	3	Team play for the position 5
4	Netherlands	3	0	0	3	1	12	−11	0	Team play for the position 7

Source: CP-ISRA World Games 2001 - Football CP World Cup results
Rules for classification: Tie-breaking criteria
24 July 2001

Brazil	2–1	Netherlands

24 July 2001

Ukraine	5–0	United States

26 July 2001

Ukraine	5–0	Netherlands

26 July 2001

United States	1–3	Brazil

27 July 2001

Netherlands	0–5	United States

27 July 2001

Ukraine	3–2	Brazil

=== Group 7 ===
Pos	Team	Pld	W	D	L	GF	GA	GD	Pts	position
1	Spain	4	3	1	0	23	1	+22	10	position 9
2	Portugal	4	3	1	0	21	2	+19	10	position 10
3	(Republic of Ireland) Ireland	4	2	0	2	14	8	+6	6	position 11
4	Belgium	4	1	0	3	7	12	−5	3	position 12
5	Scotland	4	0	0	4	0	42	−42	0	position 13

Source: CP-ISRA World Games 2001 - Football CP World Cup results
Rules for classification: Tie-breaking criteria

Scotland	0–14	Portugal

Ireland (Republic of Ireland)	4–1	Belgium

Belgium	0–3	Spain

Scotland	0–8	(Republic of Ireland) Ireland

Scotland	0–15	Spain

Belgium	1–5	Portugal

Spain	0–0	Portugal

Scotland	0–5	Belgium

Portugal	2–1	(Republic of Ireland) Ireland

Ireland (Republic of Ireland)	1–5	Spain

== Finals ==
Position 7-8

28 July 2001

Netherlands	1–2	England & Wales

Position 5-6

28 July 2001

United States	0–1	Australia

Position 3-4

28 July 2001

Brazil	2–0	Iran

Final

28 July 2001

Russia	1–3	Ukraine

== Statistics ==
=== Ranking ===
Rank	Team
Gold medal	Ukraine
Silver medal	Russia
Bronze medal	Brazil
4.	(Republic of Ireland) Ireland
5.	Australia
6.	United States
7.	England & Wales
8.	Netherlands
9.	Spain
10.	Portugal
11.	(Republic of Ireland) Ireland
12.	Belgium
13.	Scotland
