= 2003 CPISRA Soccer World Championships =

2003 CPISRA Football 7-a-side World Championships
Tournament details
- Host country: Argentina
- Dates: 8 – 22 October 2003
- Teams: 12
- Venue: 1 (in 1 host city)

Final positions
- Champions: Ukraine
- Runners-up: Brazil
- Third place: Russia
- Fourth place: Argentina

The 2003 CPISRA Football 7-a-side World Championships was the world championship for men's national 7-a-side association football teams. CPISRA stands for Cerebral Palsy International Sports & Recreation Association. Athletes with a physical disability competed. The Championship took place in Argentina from 8 to 22 October 2003.

Football 7-a-side was played with modified FIFA rules. Among the modifications were that there were seven players, no offside, a smaller playing field, and permission for one-handed throw-ins. Matches consisted of two thirty-minute halves, with a fifteen-minute half-time break. The Championships was a qualifying event for the Athens 2004 Paralympic Games.

== Participating teams and officials ==
=== Qualifying ===
The following teams are qualified for the tournament:

Means of qualification	Date	Venue	Berths	Qualified
Host nation			1	Argentina
2002 Pan-American Soccer Championship	22 – 29 September 2002	Santiago, Chile	2	Brazil; United States
2002 FESPIC Games	26 October – 1& November 2002	Busan, South Korea	1	South Korea
2002 European Soccer Championship	30 August – 8 September 2002	Kyiv, Ukraine	6	(United Kingdom) Great Britain (Republic of Ireland) Ireland; Netherlands; Portugal; Russia; Ukraine
Oceania Region			1	Australia
Total			11	

== Venues ==
The venues to be used for the World Championships were located in Buenos Aires.

Buenos Aires	2003 CPISRA Soccer World Championships is located in Argentina
Stadium: unknown	2003 CPISRA Soccer World Championships is located in Argentina
Capacity: unknown	2003 CPISRA Soccer World Championships is located in Argentina

== Group stage ==
=== Group 1 ===
Pos	Team	Pld	W	D	L	GF	GA	GD	Pts	Qualified for
1	Brazil	0	0	0	0	0	0	0	0	Team play for the position 1 - 2
2	Russia	0	0	0	0	0	0	0	0	Team play for the third place
3	(Republic of Ireland) Ireland*	0	0	0	0	0	0	0	0	Team play for the position 5 - 6
4	Netherlands	0	0	0	0	0	0	0	0	Team play for the position 7 - 8
5	Australia*	0	0	0	0	0	0	0	0	Team play for the position 9 - 10
6	South Korea	0	0	0	0	0	0	0	0	Team has the position 11

Source: no more detailed information about the table stand available
The teams with * the placement is presumed due to the available results.
Rules for classification: Tie-breaking criteria
11 October 2003

Ireland (Republic of Ireland)	3–1	Netherlands
	Report

11 October 2003

–

11 October 2003

–

13 October 2003

Brazil	2–0	Netherlands
	Report

13 October 2003

–

13 October 2003

–

14 October 2003

Netherlands	1–2	Russia
	Report

14 October 2003

–

14 October 2003

–

16 October 2003

South Korea	0–12	Netherlands
	Report

16 October 2003

–

16 October 2003

–

18 October 2003

Australia	0–3	Netherlands
	Report

18 October 2003

–

18 October 2003

–

=== Group 2 ===
Pos	Team	Pld	W	D	L	GF	GA	GD	Pts	Qualified for
1	Ukraine	0	0	0	0	0	0	0	0	Team play for the Final
2	Argentina	0	0	0	0	0	0	0	0	Team play for the third place
3	(United States) USA*	0	0	0	0	0	0	0	0	Team play for the position 5 - 6
4	(United Kingdom) Great Britain	0	0	0	0	0	0	0	0	Team play for the position 7 - 8
5	Portugal*	0	0	0	0	0	0	0	0	Team play for the position 9 - 10

Source: no more detailed information about the table stand available
The teams with * the placement is presumed due to the available results.
Rules for classification: Tie-breaking criteria

Argentina	2–2	Ukraine
	Report

–

Ukraine	1–0	(United Kingdom) Great Britain
	Report

–

–

–

Ukraine	5–0	(United States) USA
	Report

–

Ukraine	5–0	Portugal
	Report

–

== Semifinals ==
20 October 2003

Brazil	–	Argentina

20 October 2003

Ukraine	3–2	Russia
Volodymyr Kabanov, ...	Report

== Finals ==
Position 9-10

20 October 2003

–

Position 7-8

20 October 2003

Great Britain (United Kingdom)	0–4	Netherlands
	Report

Position 5-6

20 October 2003

–

Position 3-4

22 October 2003

Russia	2–1	Argentina

Final

22 October 2003

Ukraine	3–1	Brazil
Taras Dutko, Volodymyr Antoniuk, Andrii Roztoka	Report

== Statistics ==
=== Ranking ===
Rank	Team
Gold medal	Ukraine
Silver medal	Brazil
Bronze medal	Russia
4.	Argentina
5.	
6.	
7.	Netherlands
8.	(United Kingdom) Great Britain
9.	
10.	
11.	South Korea
