= 2018 IFCPF CP Football Asia-Oceana Championship =

Tournament details
- Host country: Iran
- Dates: 24 - 29 October
- Teams: 5
- Venue(s): 1 (in 1 host city)

Final positions
- Champions: Iran
- Runners-up: Australia
- Third place: Jordan
- Fourth place: Thailand

Tournament statistics
- Matches played: 10

The 2018 IFCPF CP Football Asia-Oceana Championship was an Asia-Oceana championship for men's national 7-a-side association football teams. IFCPF stands for International Federation of Cerebral Palsy Football. Athletes with a physical disability competed. The Championship took place in Ecuador from 24 to 29 October 2018.

CP Football was played with modified FIFA rules. Among the modifications were that there were seven players, no offside, a smaller playing field, and permission for one-handed throw-ins. Matches consisted of two thirty-minute halves, with a fifteen-minute half-time break. The Championships was a qualifying event for the 2019 IFCPF CP Football World Championships.

== Participating teams and officials ==
=== Teams ===
Means of qualification	Berths	Qualified
Host nation	1	Iran
Asian and Oceanian Region	4	Australia; Jordan; South Korea; Thailand
Total	5	

=== Squads ===
The individual teams contact following football gamblers on to:

Group

Australia	Iran	Jordan	South Korea	Thailand

== Venues ==
The venues to be used for the Asia-Oceana Championships were located in Kish Island.

Kish Island	2018 IFCPF CP Football Asia-Oceana Championship is located in Iran
Stadium: Olympic Stadium (Kish)	2018 IFCPF CP Football Asia-Oceana Championship is located in Iran
Capacity:	2018 IFCPF CP Football Asia-Oceana Championship is located in Iran

== Format ==
The teams play in a group that placed first is the winner of the tournament.

Tie-breaking criteria for group play
The ranking of teams in each group was based on the following criteria:
1. Number of points
2. Goal difference
3. Number of goals scored
4. Number of points obtained in matches between tied teams
5. Goal difference in matches between tied teams
6. Number of goals scored in matches between tied teams
7. Drawing of lots

Classification
Athletes with a physical disability competed. The athlete's disability was caused by a non-progressive brain damage that affects motor control, such as cerebral palsy, traumatic brain injury or stroke. Athletes must be ambulant.

Players were classified by level of disability.

- C5: Athletes with difficulties when walking and running, but not in standing or when kicking the ball.
- C6: Athletes with control and co-ordination problems of their upper limbs, especially when running.
- C7: Athletes with hemiplegia.
- C8: Athletes with minimal disability; must meet eligibility criteria and have an impairment that has impact on the sport of football.

Teams must field at least one class C5 or C6 player at all times. No more than two players of class C8 are permitted to play at the same time.

== Group stage ==
In the group stage have seen the teams in a one group of five teams.

Pos	Team	Pld	W	D	L	GF	GA	GD	Pts	Qualified for
1	Iran	4	4	0	0	30	2	+28	12	Team has the gold medal
2	Australia	4	3	0	1	21	8	+13	9	Team have the silver medal
3	Jordan	4	2	0	2	14	19	−5	6	Team has the bronze medal
4	Thailand	4	1	0	3	7	18	−11	3	
5	South Korea	4	0	0	4	3	28	−25	0	

Source: IFCPF CP Football 2018 Asia-Oceana Championship
Rules for classification: Tie-breaking criteria
24 October 2018
15:00

Australia	11–0 (4–0)	South Korea
	Report

24 October 2018
18:00

Iran	7–1 (3–0)	Thailand
	Report

26 October 2018
16:00

Thailand	0–3 (0–2)	Australia
	Report

26 October 2018
18:00

Jordan	5–2 (2–1)	South Korea
	Report

27 October 2018
16:00

South Korea	0–4 (0–1)	Thailand
	Report

27 October 2018
18:00

Iran	8–0 (5–0)	Jordan
	Report

28 October 2018
16:00

Australia	7–1 (3–0)	Jordan
	Report

28 October 2018
18:00

South Korea	1–8 (0–4)	Iran
	Report

29 October 2018
16:00

Jordan	8–2 (6–0)	Thailand
	Report

29 October 2018
18:00

Iran	7–0 (4–0)	Australia
	Report

== Statistics ==
=== Ranking ===
Rank	Team
Gold medal	Iran
Silver medal	Australia
Bronze medal	Jordan
4.	Thailand
5.	South Korea
