= 1998 CPISRA Soccer World Championships =

Tournament details
- Host country: Brazil
- Dates: 3 September to 14 September 1998
- Teams: 11
- Venue: 1 (in 1 host city)

Final positions
- Champions: Ukraine
- Runners-up: Russia
- Third place: Brazil
- Fourth place: Spain

The 1998 CPISRA Football 7-a-side World Championships was the world championship for men's national 7-a-side association football teams. CPISRA stands for Cerebral Palsy International Sports & Recreation Association. Athletes with a physical disability competed. The Championship took in Brazil from 3 to 14 September 1998.

Football 7-a-side was played with modified FIFA rules. Among the modifications were that there were seven players, no offside, a smaller playing field, and permission for one-handed throw-ins. Matches consisted of two thirty-minute halves, with a fifteen-minute half-time break.

== Participating teams and officials ==
=== Teams ===
Means of qualification	Berths	Qualified
Host nation	1	Brazil
Americas Region	2	Argentina (United States) USA
Asian Region	1	South Korea
European Region	7	(United Kingdom) Great Britain (Republic of Ireland) Ireland; Netherlands; Portugal; Russia; Spain; Ukraine
Total	11	

== Venues ==
The venues to be used for the World Championships were located in Deodoro, Rio de Janeiro.

Deodoro, Rio de Janeiro	1998 CPISRA Soccer World Championships is located in Brazil
Deodoro Sports Complex	1998 CPISRA Soccer World Championships is located in Brazil
Capacity: unknown	1998 CPISRA Soccer World Championships is located in Brazil

== Group stage ==
=== Group 1 ===
Pos	Team	Pld	W	D	L	GF	GA	GD	Pts	Qualified for
1	Brazil*	0	0	0	0	0	0	0	0	Team play for the position 1 - 4
2	Spain*	0	0	0	0	0	0	0	0	Team play for the position 1 - 4
3	Netherlands	0	0	0	0	0	0	0	0	Team play for the position 5 - 6
4	(United Kingdom) Great Britain*	0	0	0	0	0	0	0	0	Team play for the position 7 - 8
5	(United States) USA*	0	0	0	0	0	0	0	0	Team play for the position 9 - 10

Source: no more detailed information about the table stand available
The teams with * the placement is presumed due to the available results.
Rules for classification: Tie-breaking criteria
3 September 1998

–

3 September 1998

–

5 September 1998

Netherlands	4–1	(United Kingdom) Great Britain
	Report

5 September 1998

–

7 September 1998

–

7 September 1998

Spain	3–2	Netherlands
	Report

9 September 1998

–

9 September 1998

Netherlands	4–0	(United States) USA
	Report

10 September 1998

Brazil	2–1	Netherlands
	Report

10 September 1998

–

=== Group 2 ===
Pos	Team	Pld	W	D	L	GF	GA	GD	Pts	Qualified for
1	Russia*	0	0	0	0	0	0	0	0	Team play for the position 1 - 4
2	Ukraine*	0	0	0	0	0	0	0	0	Team play for the position 1 - 4
3	Argentina	0	0	0	0	0	0	0	0	Team play for the position 5 - 6
4	Portugal*	0	0	0	0	0	0	0	0	Team play for the position 7 - 8
5	(Republic of Ireland) Ireland*	0	0	0	0	0	0	0	0	Team play for the position 9 - 10
6	South Korea	0	0	0	0	0	0	0	0	Team has the position 11

Source: no more detailed information about the table stand available
The teams with * the placement is presumed due to the available results.
Rules for classification: Tie-breaking criteria
3 September 1998

Russia	2–2	Ukraine

3 September 1998

–

3 September 1998

–

5 September 1998

Ukraine	1–1	Portugal

5 September 1998

–

5 September 1998

–

7 September 1998

South Korea	0–15	Ukraine

7 September 1998

–

7 September 1998

–

9 September 1998

Ukraine	8–0	(Republic of Ireland) Ireland

9 September 1998

–

9 September 1998

–

10 September 1998

Argentina	1–4	Ukraine

10 September 1998

–

10 September 1998

–

== Knockout stage ==
=== Semi-finals ===
12 September 1998

Brazil	5–6	Ukraine
		Volodymyr Kabanov, ...

12 September 1998

Russia	–	Spain

== Finals ==
Position 9-10

12 September 1998

–

Position 7-8

12 September 1998

–

Position 5-6

12 September 1998

Netherlands	2–1	Argentina
	Report

Position 3-4

14 September 1998

Brazil	3–2	Spain

Final

14 September 1998

Ukraine	3–1	Russia
Volodymyr Kabanov, ...

== Statistics ==
=== Ranking ===
Rank	Team
Gold medal	Ukraine
Silver medal	Russia
Bronze medal	Brazil
4.	Spain
5.	Netherlands
6.	Argentina
7.	...
8.	...
9.	...
10.	...
11.	South Korea
