= 1994 CPISRA Soccer World Championships =

Tournament details
- Host country: (Republic of Ireland) Ireland
- Venue(s): 1 (in 1 host city)

Final positions
- Champions: Netherlands
- Runners-up: (Republic of Ireland) Ireland
- Third place: Belgium
- Fourth place: Spain

The 1994 CPISRA Football 7-a-side World Championships was the world championship for men's national 7-a-side association football teams. CPISRA stands for Cerebral Palsy International Sports & Recreation Association. Athletes with a physical disability competed. The Championship took place in Ireland 1994.

Football 7-a-side was played with modified FIFA rules. Among the modifications were that there were seven players, no offside, a smaller playing field, and permission for one-handed throw-ins. Matches consisted of two thirty-minute halves, with a fifteen-minute half-time break.

== Participating teams and officials ==
=== Teams ===
Means of qualification	Berths	Qualified
Host nation	1	(Republic of Ireland) Ireland
Americas Region		...
European Region		Belgium; Netherlands; France; Spain...
Total		

== Venues ==
The venues to be used for the World Championships were located in Dublin.

Dublin	1994 CPISRA Soccer World Championships is located in Ireland
Stadium: unknown	1994 CPISRA Soccer World Championships is located in Ireland
Capacity: unknown	1994 CPISRA Soccer World Championships is located in Ireland

== Group stage ==
=== Group 1 ===
Pos	Team	Pld	W	D	L	GF	GA	GD	Pts	Qualified for
1	Belgium*	0	0	0	0	0	0	0	0	Team play for the position 1 - 4
2	Netherlands*	0	0	0	0	0	0	0	0	Team play for the position 1 - 4
3	(Republic of Ireland) Ireland*	0	0	0	0	0	0	0	0	Team play for the position 1 - 4
4	France*	0	0	0	0	0	0	0	0	Team play for the position 5 - 8

Source: no more detailed information about the table stand available
The teams with * the placement is presumed due to the available results.
Rules for classification: Tie-breaking criteria
8 August 1994

Ireland (Republic of Ireland)	0–5	Netherlands
	Report

8 August 1994

–

10 August 1994

Netherlands	0–1	Belgium
	Report

10 August 1994

–

11 August 1994

Netherlands	6–0	France
	Report

11 August 1994

–

=== Group 2 ===
Pos	Team	Pld	W	D	L	GF	GA	GD	Pts	Qualified for
1	Spain	0	0	0	0	0	0	0	0	Team play for the position 1 - 4

Source: no more detailed information about the table stand available
Rules for classification: Tie-breaking criteria

–

–

–

–

–

–

== Knockout stage ==
=== Semi-finals ===
12 August 1994

Spain	0–3	Netherlands
	Report

12 August 1994

Ireland (Republic of Ireland)	–	Belgium

== Finals ==
Position 3-4

13 August 1994

Belgium	–	Spain

Final

13 August 1994

Ireland (Republic of Ireland)	0–2	Netherlands
	Report

== Statistics ==
=== Ranking ===
Rank	Team
Gold medal	Netherlands
Silver medal	(Republic of Ireland) Ireland
Bronze medal	Belgium
4.	Spain
5.	...
5.	...
...	...
