= Nigeria national cerebral palsy football team =

Nigerian football team

Cerebral Palsy 7-Aside Football Association of Nigeria
- Nickname(s): Power Eagles
- Federation: Cerebral Palsy 7-Aside Football Association of Nigeria
- Head coach: Gbenga Dosumu
- IFCPF ranking: n/a

Nigeria national cerebral palsy football team is the national cerebral palsy football team for Nigeria that represents the team in international competitions. The program for the national team was launched in 2012, but as of 2016 the team has yet to play an international match. Several games were scheduled but issues came up and the team was unable to travel for these games.

Developments took place behind the scenes to support a national squad, including hosting a tournament at the National Stadium, Lagos in July 2016. That year, Nigeria was also looking to possibly create a women's national cerebral palsy team.

== Background ==
Power Eagles Cerebral Palsy (CPFAN) manages the national team. The national team coach in 2015 and 2016 was Gbenga Dosumu. In 2015, the team manager was Adegboyega Ganiyu.

The sport was first played in Nigeria in 2012 under the direction of the Nigeria Paralympics Committee (NPC). Cerebral palsy football had a limited presence in Africa in 2015, with the sport only being played in Nigeria, South Africa, Tunisia, Ghana and Sierra Leone. In April 2015, a coaching workshop was held in the country to try to further develop the sport. .

By 2016, the national team was inactive as leadership tried to set up international matches. They had no international matches in their history. The sport was still at the development stage on a national level. A three-day tournament was held in July 2016 at the National Stadium, Lagos with four teams participating. These teams included Team Balo ldi-Araba, Team Rev. Sam lkpea, Team Premier Lotto and Team Ajadi Lawa. The competition was won by Rev. Samuel Ikpea Football. This national championship was recognized by the International Federation of Cerebral Palsy Football. Nigeria was also looking to create a women's national CP team in 2016.

Efforts to try to compete internationally took place in 2016. In January 2016, the national team was trying to secure support to travel to a tournament in Portugal in March. Nigerian para-table tennis player Jude Uwazie led the CPFAN in 2016, and was actively looking for players to recruit for the future national team squad. In mid-2016, the national team tried to get the sport on the program for the 19th National Sports Festival (NSF) in Calabar, Cross River in order to try to raise awareness of cerebral palsy football in Nigeria.

== Cerebral Palsy 7-Aside Football Association of Nigeria ==
Cerebral Palsy 7-Aside Football Association of Nigeria (CPFAN) is in charge of governance for the sport in Nigeria. CPFAN was founded in 2012. They officially became members of the IFCPF in early 2015. Jude Uwazie is the organization's President and Chairman and Sam Ikpea the National Advisor.

== Rankings ==
In 2016, the IFCPF was busy trying to develop a regional ranking process for Africa. The team was eligible for rankings once this system was fully developed.

== Results ==
Nigeria has never participated in a Paralympic Games, World Championships or African Championship. In June 2015, Nigeria and Ghana were supposed to participate in a tournament in Spain, but both had to withdraw from it. In 2015, Ghana invited Nigeria to play a friendly in Ghana to celebrate the country's independence. Nigeria had difficulty securing funds to honor the invitation.
