= Borja Pardo Calero =

Spanish 7-a-side footballer

Borja Pardo
Medal record

Men's 7-a-side football

Representing Canada

Paralympic Games
Bronze medal – third place	1996 Atlanta	Team

Borja Pardo Calero (born 30 January 1979 in Madrid) is a 7-per-team football player from Spain.

He has a disability: he has cerebral palsy and is a CP6 type player. He played 7-per-team football at the 1996 Summer Paralympics. His team finished third after they played the United States and won 2–1. He played 7-per-team football at the 2000 Summer Paralympics. His team finished 6th.
