= 1990 CPISRA Soccer World Championships =

Tournament details
- Host country: Netherlands
- Teams: 5
- Venue: 1 (in 1 host city)

Final positions
- Champions: Netherlands
- Runners-up: (Republic of Ireland) Ireland
- Third place: Belgium

The 1990 CPISRA Football 7-a-side World Championships was the world championship for men's national 7-a-side association football teams. CPISRA stands for Cerebral Palsy International Sports & Recreation Association. Athletes with a physical disability competed. The Championship took place in the Netherlands 1990.

Football 7-a-side was played with modified FIFA rules. Among the modifications were that there were seven players, no offside, a smaller playing field, and permission for one-handed throw-ins. Matches consisted of two thirty-minute halves, with a fifteen-minute half-time break.

== Participating teams and officials ==
=== Teams ===
Means of qualification	Berths	Qualified
Host nation	1	Netherlands
Americas Region	1	United States
European Region	3	Belgium; England (Republic of Ireland) Ireland
Total	5	

== Venues ==
The venues to be used for the World Championships were located in Assen.

Assen	1990 CPISRA Soccer World Championships is located in Netherlands
Stadium: unknown	1990 CPISRA Soccer World Championships is located in Netherlands
Capacity: unknown	1990 CPISRA Soccer World Championships is located in Netherlands

== Format ==
The first round, a group stage, was a competition between the 5 teams in one group, where engaged in a round-robin tournament within itself. The two highest ranked teams in the group advanced played in the final.

Tie-breaking criteria for group play
The ranking of teams in each group was based on the following criteria:
1. Number of points
2. Goal difference
3. Number of goals scored
4. Number of points obtained in matches between tied teams
5. Goal difference in matches between tied teams
6. Number of goals scored in matches between tied teams
7. Drawing of lots

Classification
Athletes with a physical disability competed. The athlete's disability was caused by a non-progressive brain damage that affects motor control, such as cerebral palsy, traumatic brain injury or stroke. Athletes must be ambulant.

Players were classified by level of disability.

- C5: Athletes with difficulties when walking and running, but not in standing or when kicking the ball.
- C6: Athletes with control and co-ordination problems of their upper limbs, especially when running.
- C7: Athletes with hemiplegia.
- C8: Athletes with minimal disability; must meet eligibility criteria and have an impairment that has impact on the sport of football.

Teams must field at least one class C5 or C6 player at all times. No more than two players of class C8 are permitted to play at the same time.

== Group stage ==
In the group stage have seen the teams in a one group of five teams.

Pos	Team	Pld	W	D	L	GF	GA	GD	Pts	Qualified for
1	Netherlands	0	0	0	0	0	0	0	0	Team play for the Final
2	(Republic of Ireland) Ireland	0	0	0	0	0	0	0	0	Team play for the Final
3	Belgium	0	0	0	0	0	0	0	0	Team play for the position 3
4	United States*	0	0	0	0	0	0	0	0	Team play for the position 3
5	England*	0	0	0	0	0	0	0	0	Team has the position 5

Source: no more detailed information about the table stand available
The teams with * the placement is presumed due to the available results.
Rules for classification: Tie-breaking criteria
18 July 1990

Netherlands	3–0	(Republic of Ireland) Ireland
	Report

18 July 1990

–

19 July 1990

Netherlands	4–1	Belgium
	Report

19 July 1990

–

21 July 1990

Netherlands	5–0	United States
	Report

21 July 1990

–

22 July 1990

Netherlands	6–0	England
	Report

22 July 1990

–

== Finals ==
Position 3-4

Belgium	–

Final

25 July 1990

Netherlands	5–0	(Republic of Ireland) Ireland
	Report

== Statistics ==
=== Ranking ===
Rank	Team
Gold medal	Netherlands
Silver medal	(Republic of Ireland) Ireland
Bronze medal	Belgium
4.	...
5.	...
