= 1995 CPISRA European Soccer Championship =

Tournament details
- Host country: England
- Dates: 14 - 19 August 1995
- Teams: 7 (8)
- Venue: 1 (in 1 host city)

Final positions
- Champions: Netherlands (2nd title)
- Runners-up: Russia

The 1995 CPISRA European Soccer Championship was the European championship for men's national 7-a-side association football teams. CPISRA stands for Cerebral Palsy International Sports & Recreation Association. Athletes with a physical disability competed. The Championship took place in England 1995.

Football 7-a-side was played with modified FIFA rules. Among the modifications were that there were seven players, no offside, a smaller playing field, and permission for one-handed throw-ins. Matches consisted of two thirty-minute halves, with a fifteen-minute half-time break.

== Participating teams and officials ==
=== Teams ===
Means of qualification	Berths	Qualified
Host nation	1	England
European Region		Belgium (Republic of Ireland) Ireland; Netherlands; Spain; Russia...
Total	7(8)	

== Venues ==
The venues to be used for the World Championships were located in Nottingham.

Nottingham	1995 CPISRA European Soccer Championship is located in England
Harvey Hadden Stadium	1995 CPISRA European Soccer Championship is located in England
Capacity: unknown	1995 CPISRA European Soccer Championship is located in England

== Group stage ==
=== Group 1 ===
Pos	Team	Pld	W	D	L	GF	GA	GD	Pts	Qualified for
1	Netherlands	0	0	0	0	0	0	0	0	Team play for the position 1 - 4
2	Russia	0	0	0	0	0	0	0	0	Team play for the position 1 - 4
3	Spain*	0	0	0	0	0	0	0	0	Team play for the position 5 - 8
4	Belgium*	0	0	0	0	0	0	0	0	Team play for the position 5 - 8

Source: no more detailed information about the table stand available
The teams with * the placement is presumed due to the available results.
Rules for classification: Tie-breaking criteria
14 August 1995

Spain	2–4	Netherlands
	Report

14 August 1995

Russia	–	Belgium

15 August 1995

Belgium	0–6	Netherlands
	Report

15 August 1995

Russia	–	Spain

16 August 1995

Netherlands	0–0	Russia
	Report

16 August 1995

Spain	–	Belgium

=== Group 2 ===
Pos	Team	Pld	W	D	L	GF	GA	GD	Pts	Qualified for
1	(Republic of Ireland) Ireland	0	0	0	0	0	0	0	0	Team play for the position 1 - 4
2	England	0	0	0	0	0	0	0	0	Team play for the position 1 - 4

Source: no more detailed information about the table stand available
Rules for classification: Tie-breaking criteria

–

–

–

–

–

–

== Knockout stage ==
=== Semi-finals ===
18 August 1995

England	0–3	Netherlands
	Report

18 August 1995

Russia	–	(Republic of Ireland) Ireland

== Finals ==
Position 3-4

19 August 1995

England	–	(Republic of Ireland) Ireland

Final

19 August 1995

Netherlands	0–0(a.e.t.)	Russia
	Report
Penalties
	–

== Statistics ==
=== Ranking ===
Rank	Team
Gold medal	Netherlands
Silver medal	Russia
Bronze medal	...
4.	...
