= Football 7-a-side at the 2007 Parapan American Games =

- Venue: Deodoro Military Club
- Dates: 13 – 18 August 2007
- Competitors: from 6 nations
- Teams: 6

Medalists
| 1st place, gold medalist(s) | | Brazil |
| 2nd place, silver medalist(s) | | Argentina |
| 3rd place, bronze medalist(s) | | Canada |

Football 7-a-side competitions at the 2007 Parapan American Games in Rio de Janeiro was held from 13 – 18 August 2007 at the Deodoro Military Club.

== Participating teams and officials ==
=== Qualifying ===
A total of five teams will qualify to compete in the football five a side competition. The host nation (Brazil) automatically qualifies a team. A team may consist of a maximum of 14 athletes.

| Means of qualification | Berths | Qualified |
|---|---|---|
| Host nation | 1 | Brazil |
| Americas Region | 5 | Argentina; Canada; Colombia; United States; Venezuela |
| Total | 6 | |

=== Squads ===
The individual teams contact following football gamblers on to:

| Brazil | United States | Venezuela |

| Argentina | Canada | Colombia |

== Venues ==
The venue used for the 2007 Para Pan-American Games was located in Deodoro Military Club, Rio de Janeiro.

| Rio de Janeiro | Football 7-a-side at the 2007 Parapan American Games is located in Brazil |
| Deodoro Military Club | Football 7-a-side at the 2007 Parapan American Games is located in Brazil |
| Capacity: unknown | Football 7-a-side at the 2007 Parapan American Games is located in Brazil |

== Format ==
The first round, or group stage, was a competition between the 6 teams divided among two groups of three, where engaged in a round-robin tournament within itself. The two highest ranked teams in each group advanced to the knockout stage for the position one to four, the third-placed teams play for the fifth place.

Tie-breaking criteria for group play
The ranking of teams in each group was based on the following criteria:
1. Number of points
2. Goal difference
3. Number of goals scored
4. Number of points obtained in matches between tied teams
5. Goal difference in matches between tied teams
6. Number of goals scored in matches between tied teams
7. Drawing of lots

Classification
Athletes with a physical disability competed. The athlete's disability was caused by a non-progressive brain damage that affects motor control, such as cerebral palsy, traumatic brain injury or stroke. Athletes must be ambulant.

Players were classified by level of disability.

- C5: Athletes with difficulties when walking and running, but not in standing or when kicking the ball.
- C6: Athletes with control and co-ordination problems of their upper limbs, especially when running.
- C7: Athletes with hemiplegia.
- C8: Athletes with minimal disability; must meet eligibility criteria and have an impairment that has impact on the sport of football.

Teams must field at least one class C5 or C6 player at all times. No more than two players of class C8 are permitted to play at the same time.

== Group stage ==
The first round, or group stage, was a competition between the 6 teams divided among two groups of three.

=== Group A ===
| Pos | Team | Pld | W | D | L | GF | GA | GD | Pts | Qualified for |
|---|---|---|---|---|---|---|---|---|---|---|
| 1 | Brazil | 2 | 2 | 0 | 0 | 22 | 1 | +21 | 6 | Team play for the position 1 - 4 |
| 2 | United States | 2 | 1 | 0 | 1 | 7 | 7 | 0 | 3 | Team play for the position 1 - 4 |
| 3 | Venezuela | 2 | 0 | 0 | 2 | 1 | 22 | −21 | 0 | Team play for the fifth place |

Source: Rio de Janeiro 2007 - Seven a side
Rules for classification: Tie-breaking criteria
13 August 2007

| United States | 0–7 | Brazil |

Deodoro Military Club
14 August 2007

| United States | 7–0 | Venezuela |

Deodoro Military Club
15 August 2007

| Brazil | 15–1 | Venezuela |

Deodoro Military Club

=== Group B ===
| Pos | Team | Pld | W | D | L | GF | GA | GD | Pts | Qualified for |
|---|---|---|---|---|---|---|---|---|---|---|
| 1 | Argentina | 2 | 2 | 0 | 0 | 7 | 1 | +6 | 6 | Team play for the position 1 - 4 |
| 2 | Canada | 2 | 1 | 0 | 1 | 10 | 2 | +8 | 3 | Team play for the position 1 - 4 |
| 3 | Colombia | 2 | 0 | 0 | 2 | 0 | 14 | −14 | 0 | Team play for the fifth place |

Source: Rio de Janeiro 2007 - Seven a side
Rules for classification: Tie-breaking criteria
13 August 2007

| Argentina | 2–1 | Canada |

Deodoro Military Club
14 August 2007

| Argentina | 5–0 | Colombia |

Deodoro Military Club
15 August 2007

| Canada | 9–0 | Colombia |

Deodoro Military Club

== Knockout stage ==
=== Semi-finals ===
16 August 2007

| Brazil | 7–0 | Canada |

Deodoro Military Club

16 August 2007

| United States | 1–2 | Argentina |

Deodoro Military Club

== Finals ==
Position 5-6

17 August 2007

| Venezuela | 2–2(a.e.t.) | Colombia |
Penalties
| | 3–2 |

Deodoro Military Club

Position 3-4

18 August 2007

| Canada | 1–0 | United States |

Deodoro Military Club

Final

18 August 2007

| Brazil | 5–0 | Argentina |

Deodoro Military Club

== Statistics ==
=== Ranking ===
| Rank | Team |
|---|---|
| Gold medal | Brazil |
| Silver medal | Argentina |
| Bronze medal | Canada |
| 4. | United States |
| 5. | Venezuela |
| 6. | Colombia |

== See also ==
- Football 7-a-side at the 2008 Summer Paralympics
