= Deodoro Military Club =

Brazilian army sport facility

Coordinates: 22.872°S 43.406°W

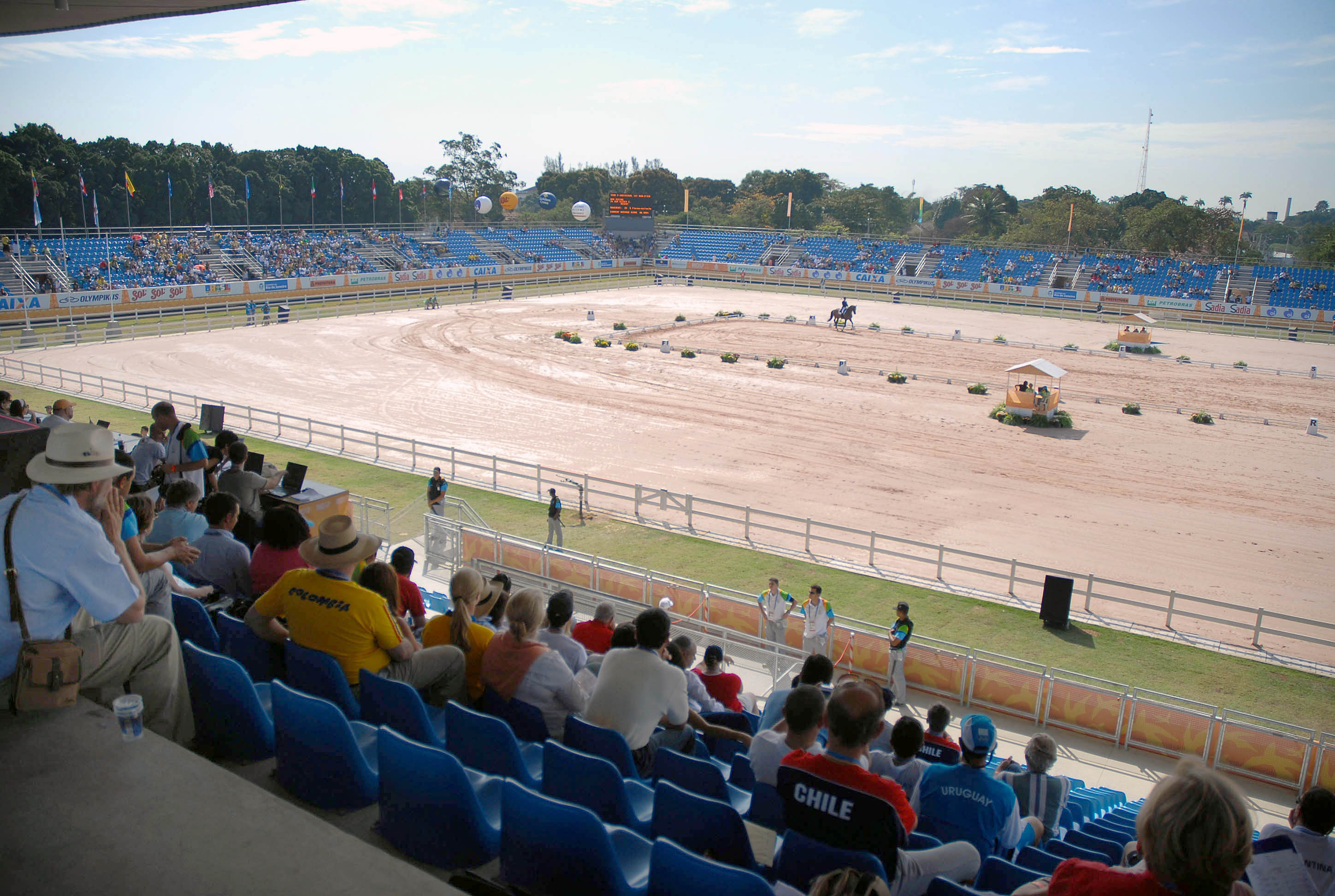
Equestrian dressage competition at the club as part of the Rio 2007 Pan American Games.

The Deodoro Military Circle is a Brazilian Army sport facility in Rio de Janeiro, at the Military Village, on the western side of the city. It has hosted the Pan American Games, Rio 2007. Equestrian (Dressage, Eventing, and Show Jumping), Field Hockey, Modern Pentathlon (shooting, fencing, swimming, show jumping and a cross country race), Sport Shooting (rifle, trap, pistol and skeet) and Archery competitions.

Permanent venues were built at the site, such as the National Equestrian Center and the National Shooting Center, besides the Archery and Field Hockey which held future competitions in these disciplines.

During the Parapan American Games Rio 2007, the Field Hockey Center held 5-a-Side and 7-a-Side football matches.

The facilities were used for the equestrian, fencing, shooting and modern pentathlon competitions at the 2016 Summer Olympics. An "X Park" was constructed nearby for mountainbiking, BMX and whitewater canoeing.

Preceded by Royal Artillery Barracks	Olympic shooting venue 2016	Succeeded by Asaka Shooting Range
