= 1991 CPISRA European Soccer Championship =

Tournament details
- Host country: England
- Dates: 16 – 20 August 1991
- Teams: 4
- Venue: 1 (in 1 host city)

Final positions
- Champions: Netherlands
- Runners-up: England

The 1991 CPISRA European Soccer Championship was the European championship for men's national 7-a-side association football teams. CPISRA stands for Cerebral Palsy International Sports & Recreation Association. Athletes with a physical disability competed. The Championship took place in England from 16 to 20 August 1991.

Football 7-a-side was played with modified FIFA rules. Among the modifications were that there were seven players, no offside, a smaller playing field, and permission for one-handed throw-ins. Matches consisted of two thirty-minute halves, with a fifteen-minute half-time break.

== Participating teams and officials ==
=== Teams ===
Means of qualification	Berths	Qualified
Host nation	1	England
European Region	3	France (Republic of Ireland) Ireland; Netherlands
Total	4	

== Venues ==
The venues to be used for the World Championships were located in Nottingham.

Nottingham	1991 CPISRA European Soccer Championship is located in England
Harvey Hadden Stadium	1991 CPISRA European Soccer Championship is located in England
Capacity: unknown	1991 CPISRA European Soccer Championship is located in England

== Format ==
The first round, or group stage, was a competition between the 4 teams in one group, where engaged in a round-robin tournament within itself. The two highest ranked teams in the group advanced played in the final.

Tie-breaking criteria for group play
The ranking of teams in each group was based on the following criteria:
1. Number of points
2. Goal difference
3. Number of goals scored
4. Number of points obtained in matches between tied teams
5. Goal difference in matches between tied teams
6. Number of goals scored in matches between tied teams
7. Drawing of lots

Classification
Athletes with a physical disability competed. The athlete's disability was caused by a non-progressive brain damage that affects motor control, such as cerebral palsy, traumatic brain injury or stroke. Athletes must be ambulant.

Players were classified by level of disability.

- C5: Athletes with difficulties when walking and running, but not in standing or when kicking the ball.
- C6: Athletes with control and co-ordination problems of their upper limbs, especially when running.
- C7: Athletes with hemiplegia.
- C8: Athletes with minimal disability; must meet eligibility criteria and have an impairment that has impact on the sport of football.

Teams must field at least one class C5 or C6 player at all times. No more than two players of class C8 are permitted to play at the same time.

== Group stage ==
In the first group stage have seen the teams in a one group of four teams.

Pos	Team	Pld	W	D	L	GF	GA	GD	Pts	Qualified for
1	Netherlands	0	0	0	0	0	0	0	0	Team play for the Final
2	England	0	0	0	0	0	0	0	0	Team play for the Final
3	France*	0	0	0	0	0	0	0	0	Team play for the third place
4	(Republic of Ireland) Ireland*	0	0	0	0	0	0	0	0	Team play for the third place

Source: no more detailed information about the table stand available
The teams with * the placement is presumed due to the available results.
Rules for classification: Tie-breaking criteria
16 August 1991

England	0–1	Netherlands
	Report

16 August 1991

Ireland (Republic of Ireland)	–	France

17 August 1991

Netherlands	0–0	France
	Report

17 August 1991

Ireland (Republic of Ireland)	–	England

18 August 1991

Ireland (Republic of Ireland)	1–8	Netherlands
	Report

18 August 1991

England	–	France

== Finals ==
Position 3-4

20 August 1991

Ireland (Republic of Ireland)	–	France

Final

20 August 1991

England	0–3	Netherlands
	Report

== Statistics ==
=== Ranking ===
Rank	Team
Gold medal	Netherlands
Silver medal	England
Bronze medal	...
4.	...
