= Cerebral Palsy Games =

Multi-sport competition for athletes with cerebral palsy

- Abbreviation: CP Games
- Inaugurated: 1972
- Website: http://www.cpsport.org/news/cpisra-world-games/

The Cerebral Palsy Games (or CP Games) were a multi-sport competition for athletes with a disability, which under the former name of the International Stoke Mandeville Games were one of the forerunners of the Paralympic Games. The competition was also known known as the International Cerebral Palsy Games or the Stoke Mandeville Games. After the 1990s, the Games have been organized by Cerebral Palsy International Sports and Recreation Association (CPISRA), also called the CPISRA World Games.

== History ==
The Games were originally held in 1976 by neurologist Sir Ludwig Guttmann, who organized a sporting competition involving World War II veterans with spinal cord injuries at the Stoke Mandeville Hospital rehabilitation facility in Aylesbury, England, taking place concurrently with the first post-war Summer Olympics in London. In 1952, the Netherlands joined in the event, creating the first international sports competition for disabled people. In 1960, the Ninth Stoke Mandeville Games were held in Rome, Italy, following that year's Olympic Games. These are considered to be the first Paralympic Games. The 2012 Paralympic mascot Mandeville was named after Stoke Mandeville Hospital.

While the Paralympic Games evolved to include athletes from all disability groups, the Stoke Mandeville games continued to be organized as a multi-sport event for wheelchair athletes. Games were held annually in Aylesbury under the direction of the International Stoke Mandeville Games Federation (ISMGF), which became the International Stoke Mandeville Wheelchair Sports Federation (ISMWSF).

In 2023 International Wheelchair and Amputee Sports Federation (IWAS) and Cerebral Palsy International Sports and Recreation Association (CPISRA) mergered into World Abilitysport. The first edition World Abilitysport Games was Nakhon Ratchasima 2023 in Thailand.

== Games ==
| No. | Year | Games | Host City | Opening Ceremony | Closing Ceremony | Ref. |
|---|---|---|---|---|---|---|
| 1 | 1972 | 1. International Cerebral Palsy Games | (England) London | | | |
| 2 | 1974 | 2. International Cerebral Palsy Games | (England) London | | | |
| 3 | 1976 | 3. International Cerebral Palsy Games | (France) Montrodat | | | |
| 3 | 1978 | 4. International Cerebral Palsy Games | (Scotland) Edinburgh | July | | |
| 4 | 1980 | 5. International Cerebral Palsy Games | (Belgium) Herentals | | | |
| 5 | 1982 | 6. International Cerebral Palsy Games | (Denmark) Greve | | | |
| 6 | 1986 | 7. International Cerebral Palsy Games | (Belgium) Gits | | | |
| 7 | 1989 | Robin Hood CP World Games | (England) Nottingham | | | |
| 8 | 1993 | Robin Hood CP World Games | (England) Nottingham | | | |
| 9 | 1997 | Robin Hood CP World Games | (Netherlands) Delden | 8 May | 12 May | |
| 10 | 2001 | CPISRA World Games; Robin Hood CP World Games | (England) Nottingham | 19 July | 29 July | |
| 11 | 2005 | CPISRA World Championships | (United States) New London | 27 June | 11 July | |
| 12 | 2015 | CPISRA World Games | (England) Nottingham | 6 August | 16 August | |
| 13 | 2018 | CPISRA World Games | (Spain) Sant Cugat del Vallès | | | |

== Results ==
=== 2015 ===
* Host nation (England)

| Rank | Nation | Gold | Silver | Bronze | Total |
|---|---|---|---|---|---|
| 1 | England (ENG)* | 85 | 52 | 19 | 156 |
| 2 | Scotland (SCO) | 29 | 13 | 11 | 53 |
| 3 | Australia (AUS) | 22 | 7 | 3 | 32 |
| 4 | Ireland (IRE) | 18 | 3 | 4 | 25 |
| 5 | Austria (AUT) | 11 | 17 | 6 | 34 |
| 6 | Denmark (DEN) | 10 | 2 | 0 | 12 |
| 7 | Sweden (SWE) | 6 | 7 | 4 | 17 |
| 8 | Portugal (POR) | 3 | 6 | 3 | 12 |
| 9 | Hungary (HUN) | 3 | 1 | 0 | 4 |
| 10 | Russia (RUS) | 1 | 0 | 0 | 1 |
| 11 | Brazil (BRA) | 0 | 2 | 1 | 3 |
| 12 | Japan (JPN) | 0 | 0 | 0 | 0 |
| 12 | Netherlands (NED) | 0 | 0 | 0 | 0 |
| Totals (13 entries) | | 188 | 110 | 51 | 349 |

- CPISRA World Games Nottingham 2015

=== 2018 ===
Over 600 participants from 30 countries in 5 sports:

==== Sports ====
1. Athletics
2. Boccia
3. CP Football
4. Swimming
5. Wheelchair Slalom

==== Results ====
- http://cpisra.org/new-site/wp-content/uploads/2019/05/para-athletics-thursday.pdf
- http://cpisra.org/new-site/wp-content/uploads/2019/03/para-athletics-friday.pdf
- http://cpisra.org/new-site/wp-content/uploads/2019/05/para-athletics-saturday.pdf
- http://cpisra.org/new-site/wp-content/uploads/2019/05/boccia-pools-individual.pdf
- http://cpisra.org/new-site/wp-content/uploads/2019/05/boccia-pairs-teams.pdf
- http://cpisra.org/new-site/wp-content/uploads/2019/05/boccia-final-classification.pdf
- http://cpisra.org/new-site/wp-content/uploads/2019/05/cp-football-results.pdf
- http://cpisra.org/new-site/wp-content/uploads/2019/05/IFCPF-Female-CP-Football-Match-Report.pdf
- http://cpisra.org/new-site/wp-content/uploads/2019/05/para-swimming-session1.pdf
- http://cpisra.org/new-site/wp-content/uploads/2019/05/para-swimming-session2.pdf
- http://cpisra.org/new-site/wp-content/uploads/2019/05/para-swimming-session3.pdf
- http://cpisra.org/new-site/wp-content/uploads/2019/05/wheelchair-slalom-erasmus.pdf
- http://cpisra.org/new-site/wp-content/uploads/2019/05/wheelchair-slalom-official.pdf

== See also ==
- Cerebral Palsy International Sports and Recreation Association
- International Federation of Cerebral Palsy Football
- CP football
- IWAS World Games
