= IFCPF Women's World Cup =

The IFCPF Women's World Cup is the main world competition of CP football for women's teams.

== History ==
The first-ever IFCPF Women's World Cup was held in 2022 in Salou, Spain.

=== 2022 IFCPF Women's World Cup ===
Ranking:

1. United States: 10
2. Australia: 9
3. Japan: 7
4. Netherlands: 3
5. Spain: 0

=== 2024 IFCPF Women's World Cup ===
Ranking:

1. Australia 12
2. United States 9
3. Ireland 6
4. Japan 3
5. Denmark 0

== See also ==
- IFCPF World Cup
