= Welsh Football Trust =

Welsh football governing body

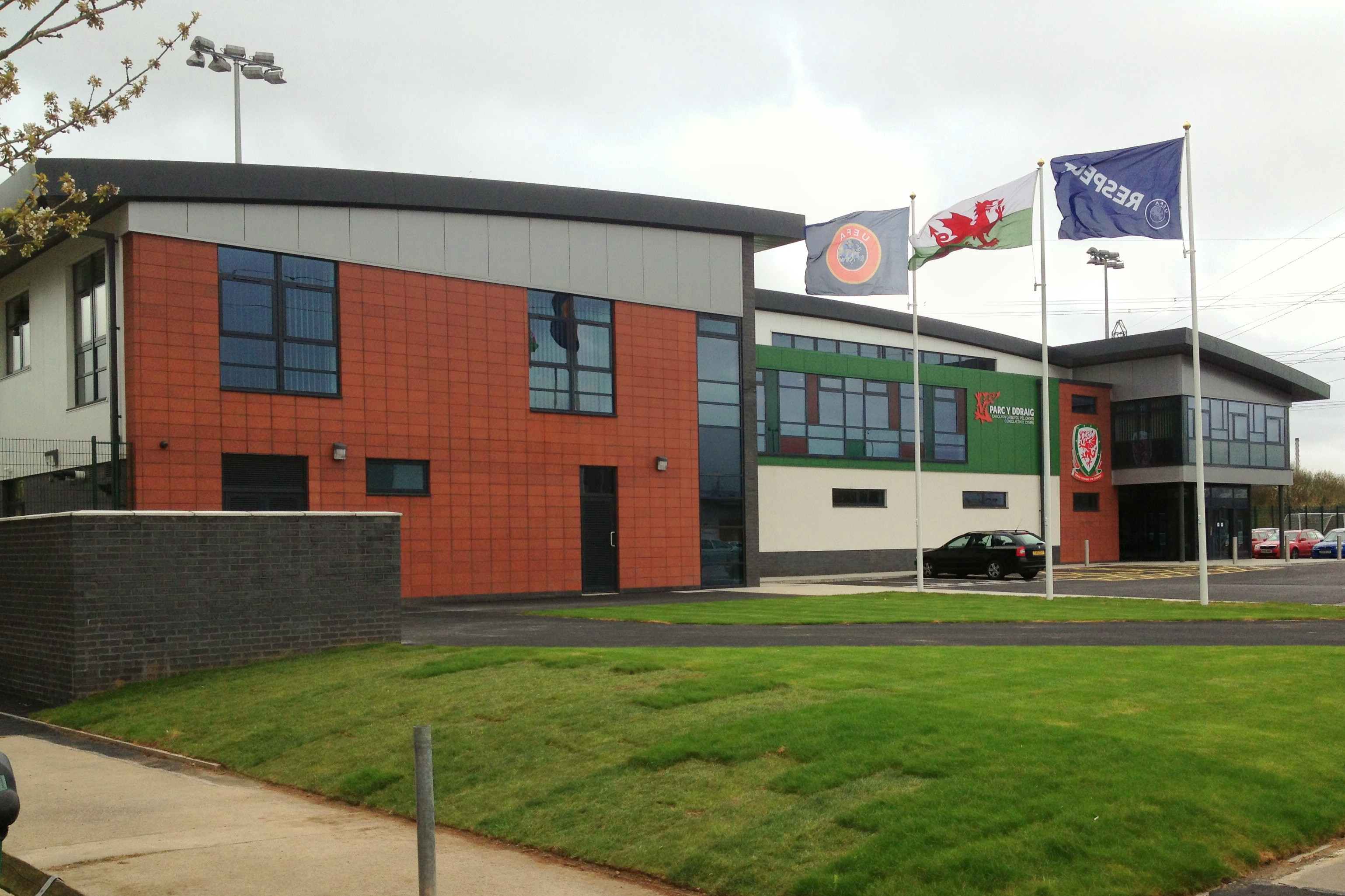
Dragon Park, Wales National Football Development Centre, Newport

The FAW Trust (Welsh: Ymddiriedolaeth Bêl-droed Cymru) (formerly known as the Welsh Football Trust) (founded 1996) is recognised as a governing body of sport in Wales by Sport Wales. It was established by the Football Association of Wales (FAW) to encourage more children in Wales to play football, to develop player and coaching talent and to support the future success of Welsh national teams. In addition to the FAW, the FAW Trust is supported by the Welsh Government, Sport Wales and the Premier League.

The FAW Trust is based at the National Football Development Centre, Dragon Park, Newport International Sports Village, Newport.
