= CP football at the 2014 ASEAN Para Games =

Football Game

Football 7-a-side at the 2014 ASEAN Para Games
- Football 7-a-side logo

Tournament details
- Host country: Myanmar
- Dates: 15 – 19 January 2014
- Teams: 4
- Venue: 1 (in 1 host city)

Final positions
- Champions: Myanmar
- Runners-up: Singapore
- Third place: Thailand
- Fourth place: Malaysia

Tournament statistics
- Matches played: 6

7-a-side football at the 2014 ASEAN Para Games were held from 15 to 19 January 2014. It was the first time the sport featured in the ASEAN Para Games.

== Participating teams ==
- Myanmar
- Malaysia
- Singapore
- Thailand

== Venues ==
The venue(s) used for the 2024 ASEAN Para Games were located in Naypyidaw.

Naypyidaw	CP football at the 2014 ASEAN Para Games is located in Myanmar
Stadium: Unknown	CP football at the 2014 ASEAN Para Games is located in Myanmar
Capacity: Unknown	CP football at the 2014 ASEAN Para Games is located in Myanmar

== Group stage ==
In the first group stage have seen the teams in a one group of four teams.

Pos	Team	Pld	W	D	L	GF	GA	GD	Pts
1	Singapore	2	2	0	0	8	3	+5	6
2	Myanmar	2	2	0	0	7	3	+4	6
3	Malaysia	2	0	0	2	5	7	−2	0
4	Thailand	2	0	0	2	1	8	−7	0

Updated to match(es) played on 17 January 2014. Source: CP 7-a-side Football at the 2014 ASEAN Para Games
Rules for classification: Tie-breaking criteria
15 January 2014
8:00

Singapore	–	Thailand

15 January 2014
9:45

Myanmar	–	Malaysia

17 January 2014
8:00

Myanmar	–	Thailand

17 January 2014
9:45

Malaysia	–	Singapore

19 January 2014
8:00

Singapore	0–2	Myanmar
	Report

19 January 2014
9:45

Thailand	–	Malaysia

== Statistics ==
=== Ranking ===
Rank	Team
Gold medal	Myanmar
Silver medal	Singapore
Bronze medal	Thailand
4.	Malaysia
