= 2002 CPISRA European Soccer Championship =

Tournament details
- Host country: Ukraine
- Dates: 30 August – 8 September 2002
- Teams: 7
- Venue: 1 (in 1 host city)

Final positions
- Champions: Ukraine (2nd title)
- Runners-up: Russia

The 2002 CPISRA European Soccer Championship was the European championship for men's national 7-a-side association football teams. CPISRA stands for Cerebral Palsy International Sports & Recreation Association. Athletes with a physical disability competed. The Championship took place in Ukraine from 30 August to 8 September 2002.

Football 7-a-side was played with modified FIFA rules. Among the modifications were that there were seven players, no offside, a smaller playing field, and permission for one-handed throw-ins. Matches consisted of two thirty-minute halves, with a fifteen-minute half-time break. The Championships was a qualifying event for the 2003 CPISRA Soccer World Championships.

== Participating teams and officials ==
=== Teams ===
Means of qualification	Berths	Qualified
Host nation	1	Ukraine
European Region	6	(United Kingdom) Great Britain (Republic of Ireland) Ireland; Netherlands; Portugal; Russia; Spain
Total	7	

== Venues ==
The venues to be used for the World Championships were located in Kyiv.

Kyiv		2002 CPISRA European Soccer Championship is located in Ukraine
Stadium: Olimpiyskiy National Sports Stadium	Stadium: Dynamo Stadium	2002 CPISRA European Soccer Championship is located in Ukraine
Capacity: 83,450	Capacity: 16,873	2002 CPISRA European Soccer Championship is located in Ukraine

== Group stage ==
=== Group 1 ===
Pos	Team	Pld	W	D	L	GF	GA	GD	Pts	Qualified for
1	Ukraine	2	2	0	0	9	0	+9	6	Team play for the position 1 - 4
2	Netherlands	2	1	0	1	2	5	−3	3	Team play for the position 1 - 4
3	Spain	2	0	0	2	1	7	−6	0	Team play for the position 5 - 6

Source: no more detailed information about the table stand available
Rules for classification: Tie-breaking criteria
1 September 2002

Ukraine	4–0	Netherlands
Taras Dutko, Serhii Vakulenko (2), Valerii Novopol'tsev	Report

2 September 2002

Ukraine	5–0	Spain
Taras Dutko (3), Andrii Roztoka, Serhii Vakulenko	Report

4 September 2002

Netherlands	2–1	Spain
	Report

=== Group 2 ===
Pos	Team	Pld	W	D	L	GF	GA	GD	Pts	Qualified for
1	Russia	0	0	0	0	0	0	0	0	Team play for the position 1 - 4
2	Portugal	0	0	0	0	0	0	0	0	Team play for the position 1 - 4
3	(Republic of Ireland) Ireland	0	0	0	0	0	0	0	0	Team play for the position 5 - 6
4	(United Kingdom) Great Britain	0	0	0	0	0	0	0	0	Team take the position 7

Source: no more detailed information about the table stand available
Rules for classification: Tie-breaking criteria

–

–

–

–

–

–

== Knockout stage ==
=== Semi-finals ===
5 September 2002

Ukraine	4–1	Portugal
Serhii Vakulenko, Serhii Krot, Volodymyr Kabanov, Andrii Roztoka	Report

5 September 2002

Russia	4–0	Netherlands
	Report

== Finals ==
Position 5-6

7 September 2002

Ireland (Republic of Ireland)	–	Spain

Position 3-4

7 September 2002

Netherlands	1–0	Portugal
	Report

Final

7 September 2002

Ukraine	6–1	Russia
Volodymyr Antoniuk (5), Taras Dutko	Report

== Statistics ==
=== Ranking ===
Rank	Team
Gold medal	Ukraine
Silver medal	Russia
Bronze medal	Netherlands
4.	Portugal
5.	(Republic of Ireland) Ireland
6.	Spain
7.	(United Kingdom) Great Britain
