= Soccer at the 1982 International Cerebral Palsy Games =

Tournament details
- Host country: Denmark
- Teams: 3 (4)
- Venue: 1 (in 1 host city)

Final positions
- Champions: (Republic of Ireland) Ireland
- Runners-up: Netherlands
- Third place: Belgium

Football 7-a-side at the 1982 International Cerebral Palsy Games was held in Greve. Football 7-a-side is played by athletes with cerebral palsy, a condition characterized by impairment of muscular coordination, stroke, or traumatic brain injury (TBI).

Football 7-a-side was played with modified FIFA rules. Among the modifications were that there were seven players, no offside, a smaller playing field, and permission for one-handed throw-ins. Matches consisted of two thirty-minute halves, with a fifteen-minute half-time break.

== Participating teams and officials ==
=== Teams ===
Means of qualification	Berths	Qualified
Host nation	?	Denmark
European Region	3	Belgium (Republic of Ireland) Ireland; Netherlands
Total	3 (4)	

== Venues ==
The venues to be used for the World Championships were located in Greve.

Greve	Soccer at the 1982 International Cerebral Palsy Games is located in Denmark
Stadium: unknown	Soccer at the 1982 International Cerebral Palsy Games is located in Denmark
Capacity: unknown	Soccer at the 1982 International Cerebral Palsy Games is located in Denmark

== Finals ==
Position 3-4

Belgium	–

Final

Ireland (Republic of Ireland)	–	Netherlands
	Report

== Statistics ==
=== Ranking ===
Rank	Team
Gold medal	(Republic of Ireland) Ireland
Silver medal	Netherlands
Bronze medal	Belgium
4.	...
