= 1999 CPISRA European Soccer Championship =

Tournament details
- Host country: Belgium
- Dates: 24 June – 1 July 1999
- Teams: 9 (10)
- Venue(s): 1 (in 1 host city)

Final positions
- Champions: Ukraine
- Runners-up: Netherlands

The 1999 CPISRA European Soccer Championship was the European championship for men's national 7-a-side association football teams. CPISRA stands for Cerebral Palsy International Sports & Recreation Association. Athletes with a physical disability competed. The Championship took place in Belgium from 24 June to 1 July 1999.

Football 7-a-side was played with modified FIFA rules. Among the modifications were that there were seven players, no offside, a smaller playing field, and permission for one-handed throw-ins. Matches consisted of two thirty-minute halves, with a fifteen-minute half-time break.

== Participating teams and officials ==
=== Teams ===
Means of qualification	Berths	Qualified
Host nation	1	Belgium
European Region		(United Kingdom) Great Britain; Finland (Republic of Ireland) Ireland; Netherlands; Portugal; Russia; Ukraine...
Total	9 (10)	

== Venues ==
The venues to be used for the World Championships were located in Brasschaat.

Brasschaat	1999 CPISRA European Soccer Championship is located in Belgium
Stadium: unknown	1999 CPISRA European Soccer Championship is located in Belgium
Capacity: unknown	1999 CPISRA European Soccer Championship is located in Belgium

== Group stage ==
=== Group 1 ===
Pos	Team	Pld	W	D	L	GF	GA	GD	Pts	Qualified for
1	Netherlands	0	0	0	0	0	0	0	0	Team play for the position 1 - 4
2	Ukraine	0	0	0	0	0	0	0	0	Team play for the position 1 - 4
3	(Republic of Ireland) Ireland*	0	0	0	0	0	0	0	0	Team play for the position 5 - 8
4	(United Kingdom) Great Britain*	0	0	0	0	0	0	0	0	Team play for the position 5 - 8
5	Finland*	0	0	0	0	0	0	0	0	Team play for the position 9 - 10

Source: no more detailed information about the table stand available
The teams with * the placement is presumed due to the available results.
Rules for classification: Tie-breaking criteria
24 June 1999

Netherlands	7–3	(Republic of Ireland) Ireland
	Report

24 June 1999

–

25 June 1999

Ukraine	2–2	Netherlands
	Report

25 June 1999

–

26 June 1999

–

26 June 1999

–

27 June 1999

Finland	0–16	Netherlands
	Report

27 June 1999

–

28 June 1999

Great Britain (United Kingdom)	0–10	Netherlands
	Report

28 June 1999

–

=== Group 2 ===
Pos	Team	Pld	W	D	L	GF	GA	GD	Pts	Qualified for
1	Russia	0	0	0	0	0	0	0	0	Team play for the position 1 - 4
2	Portugal	0	0	0	0	0	0	0	0	Team play for the position 1 - 4
3	Belgium*	0	0	0	0	0	0	0	0	Team play for the position 5 - 8

Source: no more detailed information about the table stand available
The teams with * the placement is presumed due to the available results.
Rules for classification: Tie-breaking criteria

–

–

–

–

–

–

–

–

–

–

== Knockout stage ==
=== Semi-finals ===
30 June 1999

Netherlands	3–1	Portugal
	Report

Ukraine	3–1	Russia
Volodymyr Kabanov, Serhii Vakulenko, Valerii Novopol'tsev	Report

== Finals ==
Position 3-4

1 July 1999

Russia	–	Portugal

Final

1 July 1999

Netherlands	2–4	Ukraine
	Report

== Statistics ==
=== Ranking ===
Rank	Team
Gold medal	Ukraine
Silver medal	Netherlands
Bronze medal	Russia
4.	Portugal
5.	...
6.	...
7.	...
8.	...
9.	...
10.	...
