= 2002 CPISRA Pan-American Soccer Championship =

Tournament details
- Host country: Chile
- Dates: 22 – 29 September 2002

Final positions
- Champions: Brazil
- Runners-up: Argentina
- Third place: United States
- Fourth place: Chile

The 2002 CPISRA Pan-American Soccer Championship was an American championship for men's national 7-a-side association football teams. CPISRA stands for Cerebral Palsy International Sports & Recreation Association. Athletes with a physical disability competed. The Championship took place in Chile from 22 to 29 September 2002.

Football 7-a-side was played with modified FIFA rules. Among the modifications were that there were seven players, no offside, a smaller playing field, and permission for one-handed throw-ins. Matches consisted of two thirty-minute halves, with a fifteen-minute half-time break. The Championships was a qualifying event for the 2003 CPISRA Soccer World Championships.

== Participating teams and officials ==
=== Teams ===
Means of qualification	Berths	Qualified
Host nation	1	Chile
Americas Region	3	Argentina; Brazil; United States
Total	4	

=== Squads ===
The individual teams contact following football gamblers on to:

Argentina	Brazil	Chile	United States
			Adolfo Aguilar; Jay Aprea; Josh Blue; Geoff Glass; Tim Kristner; Jon McCullough; Josh McKinney; Aaron Myers; Mike Peters; John Theobald; George Sansonetis; Eli Wolff; Dave Woosnam

== Venues ==
The venues to be used for the World Championships were located in Santiago de Chile.

Santiago	2002 CPISRA Pan-American Soccer Championship is located in Chile
Stadium: National Stadium of Chile	2002 CPISRA Pan-American Soccer Championship is located in Chile
Capacity: 48,665	2002 CPISRA Pan-American Soccer Championship is located in Chile

== Format ==
The first round, or group stage, was a competition between the 4 teams in one group, where engaged in a round-robin tournament within itself. In both of the best placed, they play in the final for the tournament, the two last teams play for third place.

Tie-breaking criteria for group play
The ranking of teams in each group was based on the following criteria:
1. Number of points
2. Goal difference
3. Number of goals scored
4. Number of points obtained in matches between tied teams
5. Goal difference in matches between tied teams
6. Number of goals scored in matches between tied teams
7. Drawing of lots

Classification
Athletes with a physical disability competed. The athlete's disability was caused by a non-progressive brain damage that affects motor control, such as cerebral palsy, traumatic brain injury or stroke. Athletes must be ambulant.

Players were classified by level of disability.

- C5: Athletes with difficulties when walking and running, but not in standing or when kicking the ball.
- C6: Athletes with control and co-ordination problems of their upper limbs, especially when running.
- C7: Athletes with hemiplegia.
- C8: Athletes with minimal disability; must meet eligibility criteria and have an impairment that has impact on the sport of football.

Teams must field at least one class C5 or C6 player at all times. No more than two players of class C8 are permitted to play at the same time.

== Group stage ==
In the group stage have seen the teams in a one group of four teams.

Pos	Team	Pld	W	D	L	GF	GA	GD	Pts	Qualified for
1	Brazil*	0	0	0	0	0	0	0	0	Team play for position 1
2	Argentina*	0	0	0	0	0	0	0	0	Team play for position 1
3	United States*	0	0	0	0	0	0	0	0	Team play for the position 3
4	Chile*	0	0	0	0	0	0	0	0	Team play for the position 3

Source: no more detailed information about the table stand available
The teams with * the placement is presumed due to the available results.
Rules for classification: Tie-breaking criteria
22 September 2014

Brazil	–	Argentina

National Stadium of Chile
22 September 2014

United States	–	Chile

National Stadium of Chile
24 September 2014

Argentina	3–1	United States
	Report

National Stadium of Chile
24 September 2014

Brazil	–	Chile

National Stadium of Chile

== Finals ==
Position 3-4

29 September 2014

United States	–	Chile

National Stadium of Chile

Final

29 September 2014

Argentina	1–3	Brazil

National Stadium of Chile

== Statistics ==
=== Ranking ===
Rank	Team
Gold medal	Brazil
Silver medal	Argentina
	United States; Chile
