= Football 7-a-side at the 1996 Summer Paralympics =

Football 7-a-side at the X Paralympic Games
- Football 7-a-side

Medalists
1st place, gold medalist(s)		Netherlands	Netherlands
2nd place, silver medalist(s)		Russia	Russia
3rd place, bronze medalist(s)		Spain	Spain

Paralympic symbol (1994-2004)

Football 7-a-side at the 1996 Summer Paralympics consisted of a men's team event.

== Medal summary ==
Event	Gold	Silver	Bronze
Men's team	Netherlands (NED) Arno de Jong; Rudi van Breemen; Jaap de Vries; Paul Heersink; Carlo Dengerink; Olaf Karssen; Peter Guntlisbergen; Dirk Hennink; Percy Enser; Olaf Donners; Rene Glimmerveen	Russia (RUS) Victor Morozov; Sergui Nikachine; Alexei Chemanine; Marat Fatiakhdinov; G. Guerassimov; Pavel Sizov; Sergey Khryashev; Nikolai Korenkov; Andrey Lozhechnikov; Alexei Silatchev	Spain (ESP) Julian Galilea; Borja Pardo; Juan Vazquez; Jesus Maria Visitacion; José Hurtado; Santiago Lopez; David Jimenez; Manuel Rufo; Aitzol Arzallus; Juan Taibo; Jorge Peleteiro
