= Football 7-a-side at the 2006 FESPIC Games =

- Football 7-a-side pictogram

Tournament details
- Host country: Malaysia
- Dates: 25 – 30 November 2006
- Teams: 6
- Venue: 1 (in 1 host city)

Final positions
- Champions: Iran
- Runners-up: Australia
- Third place: China
- Fourth place: Japan

Tournament statistics
- Matches played: 11

7-a-side football at the 2006 FESPIC Games were held 25 – 30 November 2006. There was 1 gold medals in this sport.

== Participating teams and officials ==
=== Qualifying ===
A total of five teams will qualify to compete in the football five a side competition. The host nation (Malaysia) automatically qualifies a team. A team may consist of a maximum of 14 athletes.

Means of qualification	Berths	Qualified
Host nation	1	Malaysia
Asian Region	4	Iran; China; Japan; South Korea
Oceania Region	1	Australia
Total	6	

=== Squads ===
The individual teams contact following football gamblers on to:

Group A

Iran	Japan	Malaysia

Group A

Australia	China	South Korea

== Venues ==
The venues to be used for the World Championships were located in Kuala Lumpur.

Kuala Lumpur	Football 7-a-side at the 2006 FESPIC Games is located in Malaysia
Stadium: Unknown]	Football 7-a-side at the 2006 FESPIC Games is located in Malaysia
Capacity: Unknown	Football 7-a-side at the 2006 FESPIC Games is located in Malaysia

== Format ==
The first round, or group stage, was a competition between the 6 teams in two group, where engaged in a round-robin tournament within itself. The two best placed teams of each group play in the semifinals for the final. The third-place teams play the fifth place of the tournament.

Tie-breaking criteria for group play
The ranking of teams in each group was based on the following criteria:
1. Number of points
2. Goal difference
3. Number of goals scored
4. Number of points obtained in matches between tied teams
5. Goal difference in matches between tied teams
6. Number of goals scored in matches between tied teams
7. Drawing of lots

Classification
Athletes with a physical disability competed. The athlete's disability was caused by a non-progressive brain damage that affects motor control, such as cerebral palsy, traumatic brain injury or stroke. Athletes must be ambulant.

Players were classified by level of disability.

- C5: Athletes with difficulties when walking and running, but not in standing or when kicking the ball.
- C6: Athletes with control and co-ordination problems of their upper limbs, especially when running.
- C7: Athletes with hemiplegia.
- C8: Athletes with minimal disability; must meet eligibility criteria and have an impairment that has impact on the sport of football.

Teams must field at least one class C5 or C6 player at all times. No more than two players of class C8 are permitted to play at the same time.

== Group stage ==
In the first group stage have seen the teams in a two group of three teams.

=== Group A ===
Pos	Team	Pld	W	D	L	GF	GA	GD	Pts	Qualified for
1	Iran	2	2	0	0	23	0	+23	6	Team play for position 1 – 4
2	Japan	2	1	0	1	4	11	−7	3	Team play for position 1 – 4
3	Malaysia	2	0	0	2	7	10	−3	0	Team play for the position 5

Source: The results of the table were determined from the results
Rules for classification: Tie-breaking criteria
25 November 2006
8:30

Iran	5–0	Japan
	Report

Maybank Sports Complex, Bangi
26 November 2006
8:30

Malaysia	0–8	Iran
	Report

Bank Simpanan Nasional Training Centre, Bangi
27 November 2006
8:30

Japan	7–1	Malaysia
	Report

Maybank Sports Complex, Bangi

=== Group B ===
Pos	Team	Pld	W	D	L	GF	GA	GD	Pts	Qualified for
1	Australia	2	2	0	0	23	0	+23	6	Team play for position 1 – 4
2	China	2	1	0	1	4	11	−7	3	Team play for position 1 – 4
3	South Korea	11	9	0	2	7	10	−3	27	Team play for the position 3

Source: The results of the table were determined from the results
Rules for classification: Tie-breaking criteria
25 November 2006
8:30

Australia	10–0	South Korea
	Report

Bank Simpanan Nasional Training Centre, Bangi
26 November 2006
16:30

China	0–2	Australia
	Report

Maybank Sports Complex, Bangi
27 November 2006
16:30

South Korea	0–3	China
	Report

Bank Simpanan Nasional Training Centre, Bangi

== Knockout stage ==
=== Semi-finals ===
29 November 2006
15:30

Iran	6–0	China
	Report

Maybank Sports Complex, Bangi

29 November 2006
17:30

Australia	4–0	Japan
	Report

Maybank Sports Complex, Bangi

== Finals ==
=== Position 5-6 ===
29 November 2006
8:30

Malaysia	0–3	South Korea
	Report

Maybank Sports Complex, Bangi

=== Position 3-4 ===
30 November 2006
15:30

China	4–0	Japan
	Report

Maybank Sports Complex, Bangi

=== Final ===
30 November 2006
17:30

Iran	5–0	Australia
	Report

Maybank Sports Complex, Bangi

== Statistics ==
=== Ranking ===
Rank	Team
Gold medal	Iran
Silver medal	Australia
Bronze medal	China
4.	Japan
5.	South Korea
6.	Malaysia
