= Great Britain national cerebral palsy football team =

- IFCPF ranking: n/a

Great Britain national cerebral palsy football team is the national cerebral football team for Great Britain that represents the team in international competitions, but primarily the Paralympic Games. They compete at the 1984, 1992, 2008 and 2012 Summer Paralympics. Their best performance was in 1984 when they won the bronze medal.

== Players ==
There have been a number of players for the British squad.

Name	Number	Classification	Position	Years active	Ref
Michael Barker	7	FT7, FT8	Forward	2010, 2012	
Josh Beacham	3, 12	FT7	Defender	2010, 2012	
Dean Cartwright	9	FT6		2010	
Craig Connell	1	FT7	Goalkeeper	2012	
Ibrahima Diallo	11	FT8	Midfielder	2012	
Matt Dimbylow	4	FT8	Defender	2010, 2012	
Matt Ellis	6	FT7		2010	
Richard Fox	11	FT7		2010	
Blair Glynn	2	FT7	Defender	2012	
George Fletcher	9	FT5	Defender	2012	
Alistair-Patrick Heselton	6	FT8	Midfielder/Forward	2012	
Graham Leclerc	10	FT7		2010	
Jonathan Paterson	10	FT7	Midfielder	2012	
Jordan Raynes	1	FT5		2010	
James Richmond	5	FT7	Midfielder	2012	
Martin Sinclair	8	FT7	Midfielder	2010, 2012	
Billy Thompson	13	FT5	Goalkeeper	2012	
Karl Townhend	5, 13	FT7		2010	
Sam Whately	2	FT7		2010	
Michael Wilson	3	FT7		2010	

== Coaches ==
In 2011 and 2012, the team was coached by Lyndon Lynch.

== Results ==
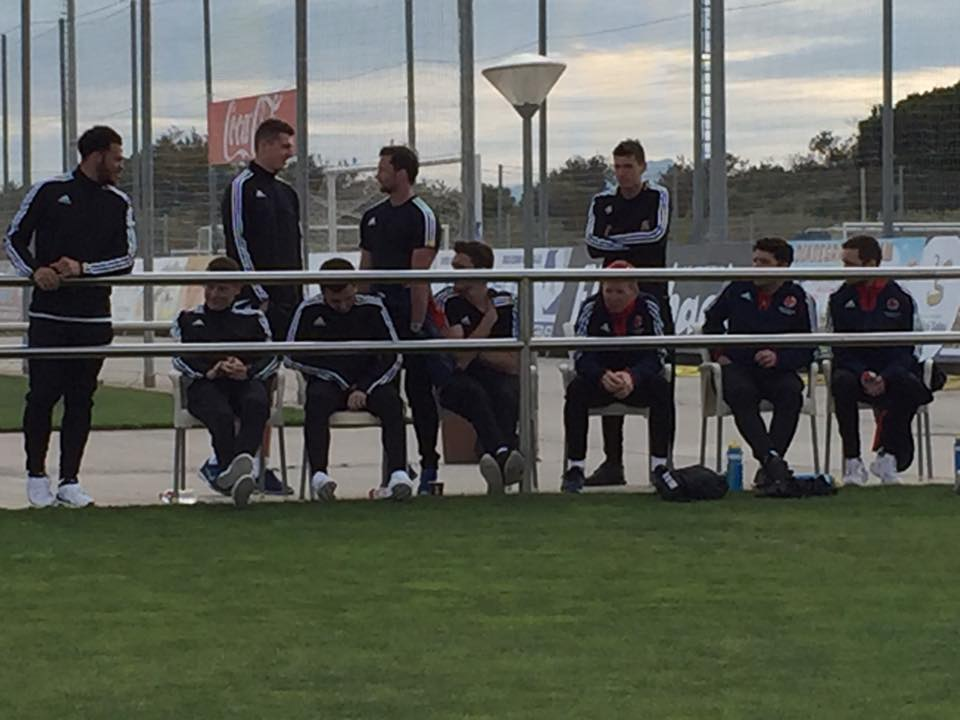
British players watch a match at the 2016 Salou tournament.

Great Britain has participated in a number of international tournaments. At the BT Paralympic World Cup in Manchester in May 2012, Great Britain met Brazil in the finals after defeating Ireland 7–3 in the semi-final. Great Britain finished third at the 2016 Pre-Paralympic Tournament in Salou, Spain after losing to the Netherlands 3 - 2 in the bronze medal game.

Competition	Location	Year	Total Teams	Result	Ref
Pre-Paralympic Tournament	Salou, Spain	2016		4	
British Paralympic World Cup	Nottingham, England	2012	12		
2012 Paralympic World Cup	London, England	2012	4		
Forvard International Tournament	Sochi, Russia	2012	5		
Nottingham British Paralympic World Cup	Nottingham, England	2010	4	3	

=== Paralympic Games ===
Great Britain has participated in 7-a-side football at the Paralympic Games.

==== 2016 Summer Paralympics ====
Great Britain secured qualification for Rio by finishing fifth at the 2015 Cerebral Palsy Football World Championships.

The draw for the tournament was held on May 6 at the 2016 Pre Paralympic Tournament in Salou, Spain. Great Britain was put into Group A with Ukraine, Brazil and Ireland. The tournament where the draw took place featured 7 of the 8 teams participating in Rio. It was the last major preparation event ahead of the Rio Games for all teams participating. Great Britain finished fourth, after losing 2 - 3 to the Netherlands in the 3rd place match.

Going into the Rio Games, England was ranked seventh in the world, while Scotland was ninth, Northern Ireland was thirteenth and Wales was unranked. No Great Britain team was ranked. On 13 June 2016, the British Paralympic Association announced the selection of the fourteen members of the British 7-a-side squad. The team includes several players from Scotland. These are FT7 classified players Martin Hickman, Jonathan Paterson and David Porcher.

Pool A

Pos	Team	Pld	W	D	L	GF	GA	GD	Pts	Qualification
1	Ukraine	3	3	0	0	10	2	+8	9	Semi finals
2	Brazil (H)	3	2	0	1	10	4	+6	6	Semi finals
3	Great Britain	3	1	0	2	7	5	+2	3	5th–6th place match
4	Ireland	3	0	0	3	2	18	−16	0	7th–8th place match

Source: Paralympic.org
(H) Hosts

==== Paralympic Results ====
Games	Results	Ref
2012 Summer Paralympics	8	
2008 Summer Paralympics	7	
1992 Summer Paralympics	4	
1984 Summer Paralympics	3	
