= Football 7-a-side at the 2002 FESPIC Games =

Soccer at the 2002 FESPIC Games
- CP Soccer pictogram

Tournament details
- Host country: South Korea
- Dates: 29–31 October 2002

7-a-side football at the 2002 FESPIC Games were held 29–31 October 2002. There was 1 gold medals in this sport.
