= Football 7-a-side at the 1992 Summer Paralympics =

Football 7-a-side at the IX Paralympic Games

Medalists
1st place, gold medalist(s)		Netherlands	Netherlands
2nd place, silver medalist(s)		Portugal	Portugal
3rd place, bronze medalist(s)		Ireland	Ireland

Paralympic symbol (1988-1994)

Football 7-a-side at the 1992 Summer Paralympics consisted of a men's team event.

== Medal summary ==
Event	Gold	Silver	Bronze
Men	Netherlands (NED) Arno de Jong; Barend Verbeek; Jaap de Vries; Paul Heersink; Carlo Dengerink; Peter Guntlisbergen; Dirk Hennink; Percy Enser; Olaf Donners	Portugal (POR) Jerônimo Pereira; José Couto; Helder Teixeira; Carlos Amaral Ferreira; Rui Santos Correia; Arlindo Silva; Mário Santos; Candido Machado; José Dias; João Cardoso; Fernando Bento	Ireland (IRL) Peter Alexander; Anthony Green; Joseph McGrane; Daniel McCarthy; Stephen Carey; Anthony Nolan; Alan Ball; Carlos Keating; Paul Leisk; Paul Cassin
