= Portugal national cerebral palsy football team =

to August 25, 2016
- Federation: Federaçao Portuguesa De Desporto Para Pessoas Com Deficiencia (FPDD)
- IFCPF ranking: 11
- Highest IFCPF ranking: 11 (2016)
- Lowest IFCPF ranking: 29 (July 2011)

The Portugal national cerebral palsy football team represents Portugal in international competition. The team has appeared at four Paralympic Games, with their best finish being a silver medal at the 1992 Summer Paralympics in Barcelona. At the most recent IFCPF World Championships, the team finished 11, winning their placement match against Australia on penalty kicks.

== Background ==
Federaçao Portuguesa De Desporto Para Pessoas Com Deficiencia (FPDD) manages the national team. By 2016, Portugal had a national championships to support the national team and was active in participating in the IFCPF World Championships. National team development is supported by an International Federation of Cerebral Palsy Football (IFCPF) recognized national championship. Recognized years for the national IFCPF recognized competition include 2010, 2011, 2012, 2013, 2014, and 2015.

== Ranking ==
Portugal was ranked eleventh in the world by the IFCPF in 2016. In November 2014, the team was ranked thirteenth. In August 2013, the team was ranked sixteenth. In September 2012, Portugal was ranked twenty-first. In July 2011, the team was ranked twenty-ninth.

== Results ==
Portugal has participated in a number of international tournaments. At the Football 7-a-side International Tournament in Portugal in 2011, Portugal lost to Canada 7 - 0. The team was scheduled to participate in the 2016 IFCPF Qualification Tournament World Championships in Vejen, Denmark in early August. The tournament was part of the qualifying process for the 2017 IFCPF World Championships. Other teams scheduled to participate included Scotland, Canada, Iran, Northern Ireland, Australia, Venezuela, Japan, Republic of South Korea, Germany, Denmark, and Spain.

Competition	Location	Year	Total Teams	Result	Ref
IFCPF World Championships Qualification Tournament	Vejen, Denmark	2016			
Footie 7 Tournament	Povao de Varzim, Portugal	2015	5	5	
Euro Football 7-a-side	Maia, Portugal	2014	11	7	
9th Barcelona International Trophy of CP Football	Barcelona, Spain	2014	4	3	
Intercontinental Cup	Barcelona, Spain	2013	16		
British Paralympic World Cup	Nottingham, England	2012	12		
Football 7-a-side International Tournament	Porto, Portugal	2011	4		

=== IFCPF World Championships ===
Portugal has participated in the IFCPF World Championships.

World Championships	Location	Total Teams	Result	Ref
2015 IFCPF World Championships	England	15	11 (win versus Australia on PK in placement match)	

=== Paralympic Games ===
Portugal has participated in 7-a-side football at the Paralympic Games, appearing at the 1984, 1992, 1996 and 2000 editions. Their best finish was a silver medal in Barcelona in 1992.

Paralympic Results

Games	Results	Ref
2000 Summer Paralympics	4	
1996 Summer Paralympics		
1992 Summer Paralympics	2	
1984 Summer Paralympics	4	
