= Spain national cerebral palsy football team =

- Federation: Federación Española de Deportes de Paralíticos Cerebrales (FEDPC)
- IFCPF ranking: 18
- Highest IFCPF ranking: 13 (August 2013)
- Lowest IFCPF ranking: 18 (2016)

Spain national cerebral palsy football team is the national cerebral football team for Spain that represents the team in international competitions. The team has participated in the Paralympic Games and the IFCPF World Championships. Their best finish in their three Paralympic Games appearances was a bronze medal at the 1996 Summer Paralympics.

== Background ==
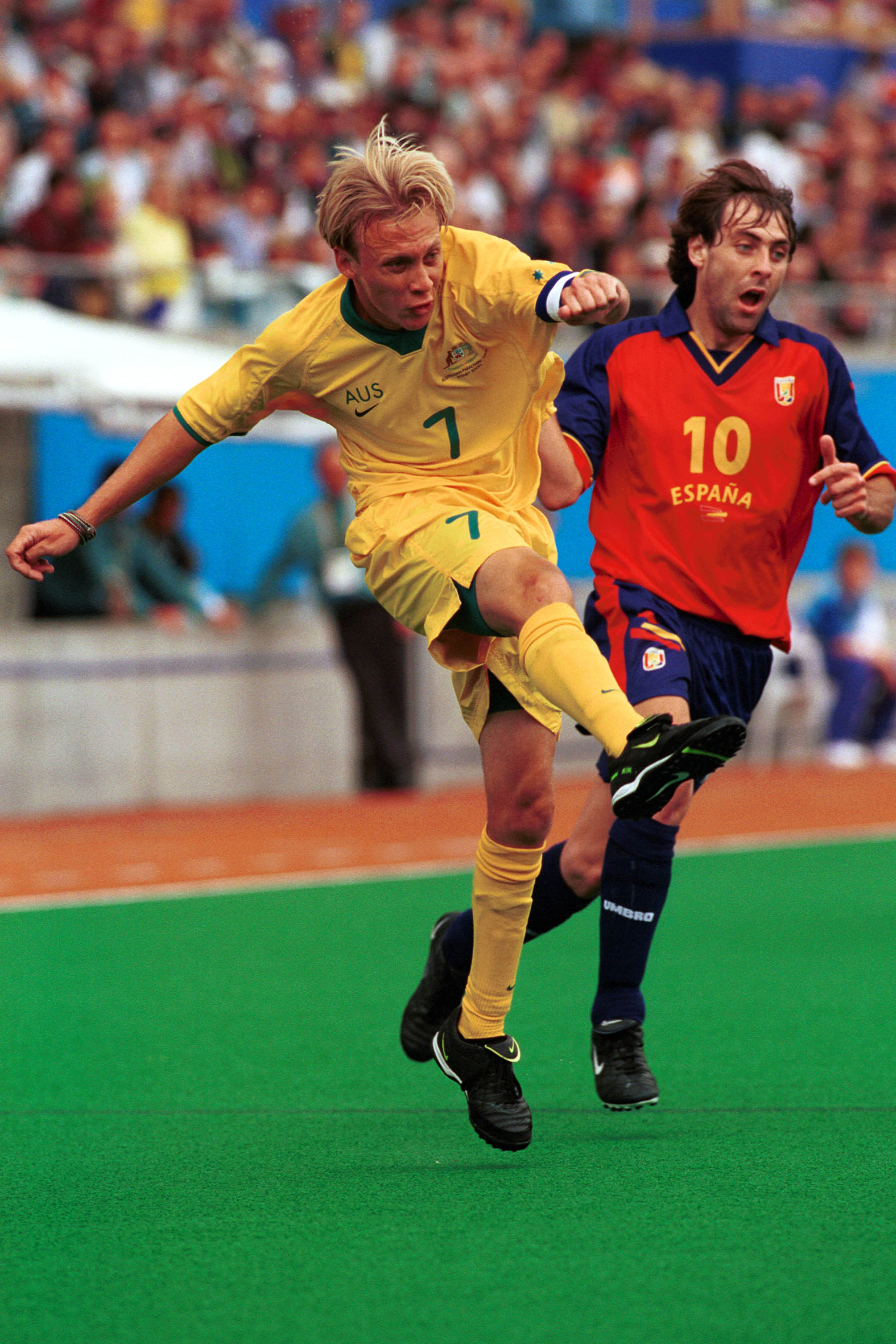
Spain takes on Australia at the 2000 Summer Paralympics.

Federación Española de Deportes de Paralíticos Cerebrales (FEDPC) manages the national team. Spain was active internationally by 2016, and had national championships to support national team player development. National team development is supported by an International Federation of Cerebral Palsy Football (IFCPF) recognized national championship. Recognized years for the national IFCPF recognized competition include 2010, 2011, 2012, 2013, 2014, and 2015.

In some circumstances, Federació Esportiva Catalana de Paralítics Cerebrals serves as the national governing body when dealing with the IFCPF, and a Catalan team competes like a national team as Catalan national cerebral palsy team in some events against full national teams. This occurred in May 2015, when two Catalan national squads played against the Tunisian squad.

== Ranking ==
Spain was ranked eighteenth in the world by the IFCPF in 2016. Spain was ranked sixteenth in November 2014. In August 2013, Spain was thirteenth. In July 2011 and September 2012, Spain was fourteenth.

== Results ==
Spain has participated in a number of international tournaments. The team was scheduled to participate in the 2016 IFCPF Qualification Tournament World Championships in Vejen, Denmark in early August. The tournament was part of the qualifying process for the 2017 IFCPF World Championships. Other teams scheduled to participate included Scotland, Canada, Portugal, Iran, Northern Ireland, Australia, Venezuela, Japan, Republic of South Korea, Germany, and Denmark.

Competition	Location	Year	Total Teams	Result	Ref
Intercontinental Cup	Barcelona, Spain	2013	16		

=== IFCPF World Championships ===
Spain has participated in the IFCPF World Championships. At the 2011 CP-ISRA World Championship in Drenthe, Spain lost to Canada 2 - 3.

World Championships	Location	Total Teams	Result	Ref
2011 CPSIRA World Championships	Netherlands	16	14	

=== Paralympic Games ===
Spain has participated in 7-a-side football at the Paralympic Games.

Paralympic Results

Games	Results	Ref
2000 Summer Paralympics	6	
1996 Summer Paralympics	3	
1992 Summer Paralympics		
