= Iran national cerebral palsy football team =

Islamic Republic of Iran seven a-side national football team

- Federation: Islamic Republic of Iran Sports Federation for the Disabled
- IFCPF ranking: 12
- Highest IFCPF ranking: 3 (July 2011 and September 2012)
- Lowest IFCPF ranking: 12 (2016)

Iran national cerebral palsy football team is the national cerebral football team for Iran that represents the team in international competitions. The team did not compete at the 2015 IFCPF World Championships. At the 2011 World Championships, they finished second. In the country's three Paralympic appearances, they won bronze in 2008 and 2012, and finished fifth in 2004.

== Background ==
Islamic Republic of Iran Sports Federation for the Disabled is in charge of managing the national team. During the 2000s, the team was one of the top four most dominant teams in the world alongside Brazil, Ukraine and Russia. In 2012, the team was coached by Amin Allahmani. National team development is supported by an International Federation of Cerebral Palsy Football (IFCPF) recognized national championship. Recognized years for the national IFCPF recognized competition include 2011, 2013, 2014, and 2015. Iran was active internationally by 2016, and had national championships to support national team player development.

In 2016, after getting an endorsement by the World AntiDoping Agency (WADA), the IFCPF Anti-Doping Code was formally amended to allow for out of competition testing. This was done through a WADA approved Whereabouts Programme managed through ADAMS. Drawing from players in a Registered Testing Pool, players from this country were included ahead of the 2016 Summer Paralympics in Rio.

== Ranking ==
Iran was ranked twelfth in the world by the IFCPF in 2016. The team is also ranked first regionally in Asia-Oceania. In August 2013 and November 2014, the team was ranked fifth. Iran was ranked third in July 2011 and September 2012.

== Players ==
There have been a number of players for the Iranian squad.

| Name | Number | Classification | Position | Years active | Ref |
|---|---|---|---|---|---|
| Moslem Akbari | 13 | FT7 | Forward | 2012 | |
| Hashem Rastegarimobin | 2 | FT7 | | 2012 | |
| Farzad Mehri | 6 | FT7 | | 2012 | |
| Jasem Bakhshi | 3 | FT7 | Defender | 2012 | |
| Boshehri Ehsan Gholamhosseinpour | 8 | FT8 | | 2012 | |
| Bahman Ansari | 10 | FT8 | | 2012 | |
| Moslem Khazaeipirsarabi | 22 | FT5 | | 2012 | |
| Karimizade Abdolreza / Abdolreza Karimizadeh | 12 | FT7 | Forward | 2012 | |
| Sadegh Hassani | 5 | FT8 | Midfielder | 2012 | |
| Rasoul Atashafrouz | 11 | FT8 | | 2012 | |
| Majd Mehran Nekoee | 1 | FT7 | Goalkeeper | 2012 | |
| Morteza Heidarimehr / Morteza Heidari | 9 | FT6 | | 2012 | |

== Results ==
Iran has participated in a number of international tournaments. Iran won the 2014 Asian Para Games after defeating Japan 5 - 0 in the final. The team was scheduled to participate in the 2016 IFCPF Qualification Tournament World Championships in Vejen, Denmark in early August. The tournament was part of the qualifying process for the 2017 IFCPF World Championships. Other teams scheduled to participate included Scotland, Canada, Portugal, Northern Ireland, Australia, Venezuela, Japan, Republic of South Korea, Germany, Denmark, and Spain. They won the event with five straight victories.

| Competition | Location | Year | Total Teams | Result | Ref |
|---|---|---|---|---|---|
| IFCPF World Championships Qualification Tournament | Vejen, Denmark | 2016 | | 1 | |
| Asian Para Games | Incheon, South Korea | 2014 | 4 | 1 | |
| British Paralympic World Cup | Nottingham, England | 2012 | 12 | | |
| Yevpretoria Ukraine | Yevpatoria, Crimea, Ukraine | 2012 | 8 | | |
| Forvard International Tournament | Sochi, Russia | 2012 | 5 | | |
| CPISRA International Championships | Arnhem, Netherlands | 2009 | 11 | | |

=== IFCPF World Championships ===
Iran has participated in the IFCPF World Championships. The country was supposed to participate in the 2015 edition, but because of visa issues were unable to do so.

| World Championships | Location | Total Teams | Result | Ref |
|---|---|---|---|---|
| 2011 CPSIRA World Championships | Netherlands | 16 | 2 | |
| 2007 CPISRA World Championships | Rio de Janeiro, Brazil | | 2 | |

=== Paralympic Games ===
Iran has participated in 7-a-side football at the Paralympic Games.

Paralympic Results

| Games | Results | Ref |
|---|---|---|
| 2012 Summer Paralympics | 3 | |
| 2008 Summer Paralympics | 3 | |
| 2004 Summer Paralympics | 5 | |

2016 Games Iran had missed out on qualification for Rio initially because they had visa issues that did not allow them to participate in the IFCPF World Championships, and there were not enough teams to allow for a viable Asian qualifying competition. They were included following the suspension of Russia. The IFCPF said in their rationale for picking Iran that it would increase continental inclusion from 2 to 3, and they would be replacing one potential medalist with another potential medalist. They go to the Rio Games having won the 2016 IFCPF Qualification Tournament World Championships in Vejen, Denmark a month earlier.

| Pos | Team | Pld | W | D | L | GF | GA | GD | Pts | Qualification |
|---|---|---|---|---|---|---|---|---|---|---|
| 1 | Ukraine | 3 | 3 | 0 | 0 | 10 | 2 | +8 | 9 | Semi finals |
| 2 | Brazil (H) | 3 | 2 | 0 | 1 | 10 | 4 | +6 | 6 | Semi finals |
| 3 | Great Britain | 3 | 1 | 0 | 2 | 7 | 5 | +2 | 3 | 5th–6th place match |
| 4 | Ireland | 3 | 0 | 0 | 3 | 2 | 18 | −16 | 0 | 7th–8th place match |

Source: Paralympic.org
(H) Hosts
