= England national cerebral palsy football team =

- Federation: The Football Association
- IFCPF ranking: 5
- Highest IFCPF ranking: 5 (2021)
- Lowest IFCPF ranking: 11 (July 2011, September 2012)

England national cerebral palsy football team is the national cerebral football team for England that represents the team in international competitions. The team is currently ranked 5th in the world.

== Background ==
The Football Association manages the national team. The team held a national team training camp in Macau in 2007 in 2008, where their performance was tracked to assess among other things how jet lag impacted their performance. The study found that jet lag impacted performance for the first three to four days. In October 2014, an IFCPF coaching workshop was held in Wales to try to further develop the sport, with participants from Wales, England and the Republic of Ireland. By 2016, England had a national championships to support the national team and was active in participating in the IFCPF World Championships. National team development is supported by an International Federation of Cerebral Palsy Football (IFCPF) recognized national championship. Recognized years for the national IFCPF recognized competition include 2013, 2014, 2015, and 2016.

In 2016, after getting an endorsement by the World AntiDoping Agency (WADA), the IFCPF Anti-Doping Code was formally amended to allow for out of competition testing. This was done through a WADA approved Whereabouts Programme managed through ADAMS. Drawing from players in a Registered Testing Pool, players from this country were included ahead of the 2016 Summer Paralympics in Rio.

== Ranking ==
England are currently ranked fourth in the world by the IFCPF. Previously in August 2013, and November 2014, they were ranked tenth. In July 2011 and September 2012, England was ranked eleventh.

== Results ==
England has participated in a number of international tournaments.

Competition	Location	Year	Total Teams	Result	Ref
Dublin Friendship Cup	Dublin, Ireland	2016			
CPISRA World Games	Nottingham, England	2015	7	3	
Euro Football 7-a-side	Maia, Portugal	2014	11	5	
9th Barcelona International Trophy of CP Football	Barcelona, Spain	2014	4	1	
Intercontinental Cup	Barcelona, Spain	2013	16		
Défi Sportif Tournament	Canada	2013	4	2	
Nations Cup	Lilleshall, England	2009	4		

=== IFCPF World Championships ===
England has participated in the IFCPF World Championships. The team trained for nine months ahead of the 2007 World Championships in Brazil.

World Championships	Location	Total Teams	Result	Ref
2015 IFCPF World Championships	England	15	5	
2011 CPSIRA World Championships	Netherlands	16	10	
2007 CPSIRA World Championships	Brazil			
