= IFCPF Americas Championships =

The IFCPF Americas Championships are the continental competitions in CP football.

== Results ==
| Year | Host | Winner | Score | Runner-up | Third place | Score | Fourth place | Number of teams | Ref. |
|---|---|---|---|---|---|---|---|---|---|
| 1995; Details | (Argentina) unknown (PSC) | United States | ^{AM1} | Argentina | Brazil | ^{AM1} | Chile | 4 | |
| 1999; Details | unknown (PSC) | Argentina | ^{AM1} | United States | Brazil | ^{AM1} | Chile | 4 | |
| 2002; Details | (Chile); Santiago (PSC) | Brazil | 3–1 | Argentina | / Chile United States | ^{AM2} | / Chile United States | 4 | |
| 2003 | (Argentina); Mar del Plata (PG) | no football 7-a-side tournament at the Parapan American Games | | | | | | | |
| 2006 | (Brazil); Rio de Janeiro (AC) | In 2006 a CPISRA America Cup was planned in Rio de Janeiro. But this was not done since 2007 the Parapan America Games and the CPISRA World Championship is carried out. | | | | | | | |
| 2007; Details | (Brazil); Rio de Janeiro (PG) | Brazil | 5–0 | Argentina | Canada | 1–0 | United States | 6 | |
| 2010; Details | (Argentina); Buenos Aires (AC) | Brazil | ^{AM1} | United States | Argentina | ^{AM1} | Canada | 6 | |
| 2011 | (Mexico); Guadalajara (PG) | no football 7-a-side tournament at the Parapan American Games | | | | | | | |
| 2014; Details | (Canada); Toronto (AC) | Brazil | 3–0 | Argentina | United States | 3–0 | Canada | 6 | |
IFCPF tournaments
| 2015; Details | (Canada); Toronto (PG) | Brazil | 3–1 | Argentina | Venezuela | 2–1 | Canada | 5 | |
| 2018; Details | (Ecuador); Sangolquí (AC) | Brazil | 4–2 | Argentina | United States | 3–0 | Colombia | 8 | |
| 2019; Details | (Peru); Lima (PG) | Brazil | 5–3 | Argentina | United States | 7–0 | Venezuela | 6 | |
