= Football 7-a-side at the 2023 Parapan American Games =

CP football competitions at the 2023 Parapan American Games

- Football 7-a-side pictogram
- Venue: Estadio Bicentenario de La Florida
- Dates: 18 – 25 November 2023
- No. of events: 1 (1 men)
- Competitors: 84 from 6 nations

Medalists
1st place, gold medalist(s)		Brazil
2nd place, silver medalist(s)		Argentina
3rd place, bronze medalist(s)		United States

Football 7-a-side or CP football competitions at the 2023 Parapan American Games in Santiago, Chile were held at the Estadio Bicentenario de La Florida from 18 to 25 November 2023.

== Participating nations ==
There are 84 players from 6 nations participating in the games.

- Argentina (14)
- Brazil (14)
- Canada (14)
- Chile (14) (Host)
- United States (14)
- Venezuela (14)

== Medal summary ==
=== Medal table ===
* Host nation (Chile)

Rank	Nation	Gold	Silver	Bronze	Total
1	Brazil	1	0	0	1
2	Argentina	0	1	0	1
3	United States	0	0	1	1
Totals (3 entries)		1	1	1	3

=== Medalists ===
Event	Gold	Silver	Bronze
Men's tournament	Brazil (BRA); Moacir Silva; Ângelo dos Santos; Heitor Ramires; João de Araújo; Jefferson Luiz; Leonardo Giovani; Ubirajara Magalhães; Evandro de Oliveira; Jefferson Miranda; César Batista; Matheus Cardoso; Bruno Ayva; Thomasson Pereira; Lucas da Silva	Argentina (ARG); Fabricio Álvarez; Matías Bassi; Cristian Billordo; Carlos Carrizo; Duncan Coronel; Matías Fernández; Nahuel Gutiérrez; Rodrigo Lugrin; Mariano Morana; Federico Ocantos; Germán Romussi; Matías Salvat; Bautista Suárez Carboneti; Matías Vera	United States (USA); Sean Boyle; Francis Lowery Jr. Jacob Crumbley; Wesley Pricinse; Jacob Kaplan; John Sulivan; Adam Ballou; Andrew Bremer; Cameron DeLillo; Benjamin Lindau; Kevin McCandlish III; Marc Estrella; Josh Brunais; Shea Hammond

== Format ==
The first round, or group stage, was a competition between the 6 teams in one group, where engaged in a round-robin tournament within itself. The best two teams play for gold in the finals, the third and fourth place for the third place in the tournament, the fifth and the sixth in the table are the fifth and the sixth of the tournament respectively.

Tie-breaking criteria for group play
The ranking of teams in each group was based on the following criteria:
1. Number of points
2. Goal difference
3. Number of goals scored
4. Number of points obtained in matches between tied teams
5. Goal difference in matches between tied teams
6. Number of goals scored in matches between tied teams
7. Drawing of lots

Classification
Athletes with a physical disability competed. The athlete's disability was caused by a non-progressive brain damage that affects motor control, such as cerebral palsy, traumatic brain injury or stroke. Athletes must be ambulant.

Players were classified by level of disability.

- C5: Athletes with difficulties when walking and running, but not in standing or when kicking the ball.
- C6: Athletes with control and co-ordination problems of their upper limbs, especially when running.
- C7: Athletes with hemiplegia.
- C8: Athletes with minimal disability; must meet eligibility criteria and have an impairment that has impact on the sport of football.

Teams must field at least one class C5 or C6 player at all times. No more than two players of class C8 are permitted to play at the same time.

== Results ==
=== Group stage ===
18 November
14:30

Chile	2 – 4	United States
Saavedra Miranda 38'; Diaz Perez 63' (pen.)		DeLillo 16', 30'; Boyle 22'; Hammond 44'

Estadio Bicentenario de La Florida, Santiago

18 November
17:00

Brazil	2 – 1	Argentina
Cardoso de Souza 4'; Magalhães 18'		Fernandez 9'

Estadio Bicentenario de La Florida, Santiago

18 November
19:30

Venezuela	2 – 1	Canada
Rea Soriano 66', 68'		Charron 36'

Estadio Bicentenario de La Florida, Santiago

19 November
14:30

Argentina	2 – 1	United States
Billordo 32'; Carrizo 40'		Crumbley 61'

Estadio Bicentenario de La Florida, Santiago

19 November
17:00

Venezuela	4 – 2	Chile
Quintana 25', 61' (pen.); Yari Villegas 38'; Rea Soriano 51'		Saavedra Miranda 2'; Velasquez 4'

Estadio Bicentenario de La Florida, Santiago

19 November
19:30

Brazil	11 – 1	Canada
de Oliveira 9', 24', 31'; Cardoso de Souza 10', 20', 39' da Silva 25', 50', 57'; Magalhães 28'; Pereira 32'		Del Cul 18'

Estadio Bicentenario de La Florida, Santiago

20 November
14:30

Argentina	4 – 0	Venezuela
Romussi 8'; Carrizo 23'; Bassi 30+2'; Fernandez 43'

Estadio Bicentenario de La Florida, Santiago

20 November
17:00

Canada	1 – 2	Chile
Butnaru 3'		Velasquez 39'; Del Pino 52'

Estadio Bicentenario de La Florida, Santiago

20 November
19:30

United States	0 – 2	Brazil
		Batista de Aguiar 30+1'; Cardoso de Souza 33'

Estadio Bicentenario de La Florida, Santiago

21 November
14:30

United States	1 – 0	Venezuela
Hammond 53'

Estadio Bicentenario de La Florida, Santiago

21 November
17:00

Chile	0 – 4	Brazil
		Batista de Aguiar 16'; Giovani 29', 35' da Silva 60+3'

Estadio Bicentenario de La Florida, Santiago

22 November
19:30

Canada	0 – 10	Argentina
		Suarez 9'; Coronel 11'; Lugrin 27', 38'; Carrizo 29'; Billordo 48', 54'; Bassi 55', 59'; Ocantos 58'

Estadio Bicentenario de La Florida, Santiago

23 November
14:30

Venezuela	0 – 5	Brazil
		Miranda 7', 44' dos Santos 25'; Pereira 60', 60+4'

Estadio Bicentenario de La Florida, Santiago

23 November
17:00

United States	6 – 0	Canada
Brunais 1', 30+4'; DeLillo 7', 15'; Lowery Jr. 40'; McCandlish 60'

Estadio Bicentenario de La Florida, Santiago

23 November
19:30

Chile	0 – 6	Argentina
		Morana 6', 13'; Fernandez 33'; Bassi 51', 54'

Estadio Bicentenario de La Florida, Santiago

=== Fifth place match ===
25 November
14:30

Chile	2 – 1 (a.e.t)	Canada
Velasquez 32'; Bórquez Poblete 66'

Estadio Bicentenario de La Florida, Santiago

=== Bronze medal match ===
25 November
17:00

United States	3 – 0	Venezuela
Hammond 35', 41'; Lowery Jr. 51'

Estadio Bicentenario de La Florida, Santiago

=== Gold medal match ===
25 November
19:30

Brazil	1 – 0 (a.e.t)	Argentina
Batista de Aguiar 72'

Estadio Bicentenario de La Florida, Santiago

== Statistics ==
=== Ranking ===
Rank	Team
Gold medal	Brazil
Silver medal	Argentina
Bronze medal	United States
4	Venezuela
5	Chile
6	Canada

== See also ==
- Football at the 2023 Pan American Games
