= 2014 CPISRA Football 7-a-side American Cup =

Tournament details
- Host country: Canada
- Dates: 19 – 26 September 2014
- Teams: 6
- Venue: 1 (in 1 host city)

The 2014 CPISRA Football 7-a-side American Cup was an American championship for men's national 7-a-side association football teams. CPISRA stands for Cerebral Palsy International Sports & Recreation Association. Athletes with a physical disability competed. The Championship took place in Canada from 19 to 26 September 2015.

Football 7-a-side was played with modified FIFA rules. Among the modifications were that there were seven players, no offside, a smaller playing field, and permission for one-handed throw-ins. Matches consisted of two thirty-minute halves, with a fifteen-minute half-time break. The Championships was a qualifying event for the 2015 IFCPF CP Football World Championships.

== Participating teams and officials ==
=== Teams ===
Means of qualification	Berths	Qualified
Host nation	1	Canada
Americas Region	5	Argentina; Brazil; United States; Mexico; Venezuela
Total	6	

=== The draw ===
During the draw, the teams were divided into pots because of rankings. Here, the following groups:

	Group A	Group B
Pot 1	Argentina	Brazil
Pot 2	Canada	United States
Pot 3	Venezuela	Mexico

=== Squads ===
The individual teams contact following football gamblers on to:

Group A

Argentina	Canada	Venezuela

Group B

Brazil	United States	Mexico

== Venues ==
The venues to be used for the World Championships were located in Toronto.

Toronto	2014 CPISRA Football 7-a-side American Cup is located in Canada
Stadium: Parapan-Am field	2014 CPISRA Football 7-a-side American Cup is located in Canada
Capacity: 2,000	2014 CPISRA Football 7-a-side American Cup is located in Canada

== Format ==
The group stage was a competition between the 6 teams divided among two groups of three, where each group engaged in a round-robin tournament within itself.

Tie-breaking criteria for group play
The ranking of teams in each group was based on the following criteria:
1. Number of points
2. Goal difference
3. Number of goals scored
4. Number of points obtained in matches between tied teams
5. Goal difference in matches between tied teams
6. Number of goals scored in matches between tied teams
7. Drawing of lots

The first-placed teams played in the final for the first place, the second place for the third place of the tournament and the last two fought for the fifth place.

Classification
Athletes with a physical disability competed. The athlete's disability was caused by a non-progressive brain damage that affects motor control, such as cerebral palsy, traumatic brain injury or stroke. Athletes must be ambulant.

Players were classified by level of disability.

- C5: Athletes with difficulties when walking and running, but not in standing or when kicking the ball.
- C6: Athletes with control and co-ordination problems of their upper limbs, especially when running.
- C7: Athletes with hemiplegia.
- C8: Athletes with minimal disability; must meet eligibility criteria and have an impairment that has impact on the sport of football.

Teams must field at least one class C5 or C6 player at all times. No more than two players of class C8 are permitted to play at the same time.

== Group stage ==
The group stage, have seen the 6 teams divided into two groups of three teams.

=== Group A ===
Pos	Team	Pld	W	D	L	GF	GA	GD	Pts	Qualified for
1	Argentina	3	2	1	0	15	3	+12	7	Team play for the position 1 - 4
2	Canada	3	2	1	0	5	3	+2	7	Team play for the position 1 - 4
3	Venezuela	3	0	0	3	0	14	−14	0	Team play for the fifth place

Source: CPISRA Football 7-a-side 2014 American Cup (xlsx)
Rules for classification: Tie-breaking criteria
19 September 2014
15:00

Argentina	3–3	Canada

Parapan-Am field
20 September 2014
17:00

Canada	2–0	Venezuela

Parapan-Am field
22 September 2014
15:00

Venezuela	0–12 (0–4)	Argentina

Parapan-Am field

=== Group B ===
Pos	Team	Pld	W	D	L	GF	GA	GD	Pts	Qualified for
1	Brazil	2	2	0	0	11	0	+11	6	Team play for the position 1 - 4
2	United States	2	1	0	1	2	3	−1	3	Team play for the position 1 - 4
3	Mexico	2	0	0	2	0	10	−10	0	Team play for the fifth place

Source: CPISRA Football 7-a-side 2014 American Cup (xlsx)
Rules for classification: Tie-breaking criteria
19 September 2014
17:00

Brazil	3–0 (2–0)	United States

Parapan-Am field
20 September 2014
15:00

United States	2–0 (2–0)	Mexico

Parapan-Am field
22 September 2014
17:00

Mexico	0–8 (0–5)	Brazil

Parapan-Am field

== Knockout stage ==
=== Semi-finals ===
24 September 2014
15:00

Argentina	2–1 (1–0)	United States

Parapan-Am field

24 September 2014
17:00

Brazil	6–1 (2–0)	Canada

Parapan-Am field

== Finals ==
Position 5-6

26 September 2014
13:00

Venezuela	1–3 (0–0)	Mexico

Parapan-Am field

Position 3-4

26 September 2014
15:00

United States	3–0 (3–0)	Canada

Parapan-Am field

Final

26 September 2014
17:00

Argentina	0–3 (0–3)	Brazil

Parapan-Am field

== Statistics ==
=== Ranking ===
Rank	Team
Gold medal	Brazil
Silver medal	Argentina
Bronze medal	United States
4.	Canada
5.	Venezuela
6.	Mexico
