= 2010 CPISRA Football 7-a-side American Cup =

Tournament details
- Host country: Argentina
- Dates: 18 – 26 October 2010
- Teams: 6
- Venue(s): 1 (in 1 host city)

Final positions
- Champions: (Brazil) United States
- Runners-up: United States
- Third place: Argentina
- Fourth place: Canada

Tournament statistics
- Matches played: 15
- Goals scored: 99 (6.6 per match)

The 2010 CPISRA Football 7-a-side American Cup was an American championship for men's national 7-a-side association football teams. CPISRA stands for Cerebral Palsy International Sports & Recreation Association. Athletes with a physical disability competed. The Championship took place in Argentina from 18 to 26 October 2010.

Football 7-a-side was played with modified FIFA rules. Among the modifications were that there were seven players, no offside, a smaller playing field, and permission for one-handed throw-ins. Matches consisted of two thirty-minute halves, with a fifteen-minute half-time break. The Championships was a qualifying event for the 2011 CPISRA Football 7-a-side World Championships.

== Participating teams and officials ==
=== Teams ===
Means of qualification	Berths	Qualified
Host nation	1	Argentina
Americas Region	5	Brazil; Canada; Mexico; United States; Venezuela
Total	6	

=== Squads ===
The individual teams contact following football gamblers on to:

Argentina	Brazil	Canada
1 Nahuel Quin Gustavo (GK); 2 Hefling Ezequiel (DF); 3 Jaime Ezequiel (DF); 4 Lugrin Rodrigo (MF); 5 Morana Mariano (MF); 6 Sosa Mario (MF); 7 Vivor Brian (MF); 8 Cardnal Carlos (MF); 9 Ferreyra Carlos (DF); 10 Medina Ariel (DF); 11 Fernandez Maxmiliano (DF); 12 Deluca Jorge (MF); Coach: Ruiz Sergio Antonio	1 Moises Silva (GK); 2 Jean Rodrigues (MF); 3 Jose Augusto Siqueira (DF); 4 Mateus Calvo (MF); 5 Renato Lima (DF); 6 Wanderson Oliveira (MF); 7 Fabio Bordignon (MF); 8 Delcio Costa (GK); 9 Emanoel Oliveira (DF); 10 Claudemir Oliveira (DF); 11 Jose Carlos Guimaraes (MF); 12 Rael Medeiros; Coach: Paulo Cruz	1 Matt Brown (GK); 2 John Phillips (DF); 3 Chris Deuhrsen (DF); 4 Jamie Ackinclose (DF); 5 Geoff Wakefield (MF); 6 Jeremi Baird (MF); 7 Dustin Hodgson (MF); 8 Brendon Mc, Adam (MF); 9 Todd Pillips (DF); 10 Chais Fawcett (DF); 11 Zack Muldock (DF); 12 Vito Proietti (MF); Coach: Drew Fercuson

Mexico	United States	Venezuela
1 Carlos Ismael sanmanlego (DF); 2 Jorge Sanchez Reyes (DF); 3 Juan D. Montejano Aleman (DF); 4 Isaac Alanis Rodriguez (MF); 5 Hugo eduardo Marquicho (MF); 6 Arturo crespo Baltazar (DF); 7 Jose Angel Guerrero Mtz (GK); 8 Jonathan Uriel Davila (DF); 9 Lus Lopez Franco (MF); 10 Rogelio Constantino Galli 5 7 (DF); 11 Jonathan A. Vega (MF); 12 Salvador Manuel Aguilar 1 7 (GK); Coach: Ivan Rodriguez Luna	1 Krit johnson (GK); 2 Chad Jones (MF); 3 Chris Ahrens (DF); 4 Tyler Bennet (MF); 5 Josch Mc Kinney (MF); 6 Adam Ballow (MF); 7 Martnell Vazquez (FW); 8 Joseph Chavez (FW); 9 James Hilaire (FW); 10 Caleb Jason Slemons (DF); 11 Tommy Latsch (MF); 12 Bryce Bcarman (DF); Coach: Jay Hoffman	1 Jorge Alexander Guzman (GK); 2 Brayan Andres Moreno (DF); 3 Wilman Jesus Ortega (DF); 4 Luis Alfredo Gutierrez (MF); 5 Pedro Jose Socorro (DF); 6 Pedro Daniel Suarez (DF); 7 Angel Evelio Molina (DF); 8 Jose Leonardo Gimon (DF); 9 Freddy Ernesto Ruiz (DF); 10 Ever Daniel Peña (DF); 11 Johandri Raul Angulo (MF); 12 Javer Jose Hernandez (GK); Coach: Jose Luis Betanor

== Venues ==
The venues to be used for the World Championships were located in Buenos Aires.

Buenos Aires	2010 CPISRA Football 7-a-side American Cup is located in Argentina
Stadium: unknown	2010 CPISRA Football 7-a-side American Cup is located in Argentina
Capacity: unknown	2010 CPISRA Football 7-a-side American Cup is located in Argentina

== Format ==
The first round, or group stage, was a competition between the 6 teams in one group, where engaged in a round-robin tournament within itself. The placements of the table are the placements of the tournament.

Tie-breaking criteria for group play
The ranking of teams in each group was based on the following criteria:
1. Number of points
2. Goal difference
3. Number of goals scored
4. Number of points obtained in matches between tied teams
5. Goal difference in matches between tied teams
6. Number of goals scored in matches between tied teams
7. Drawing of lots

Classification
Athletes with a physical disability competed. The athlete's disability was caused by a non-progressive brain damage that affects motor control, such as cerebral palsy, traumatic brain injury or stroke. Athletes must be ambulant.

Players were classified by level of disability.

- C5: Athletes with difficulties when walking and running, but not in standing or when kicking the ball.
- C6: Athletes with control and co-ordination problems of their upper limbs, especially when running.
- C7: Athletes with hemiplegia.
- C8: Athletes with minimal disability; must meet eligibility criteria and have an impairment that has impact on the sport of football.

Teams must field at least one class C5 or C6 player at all times. No more than two players of class C8 are permitted to play at the same time.

== Group stage ==
In the first group stage have seen the teams in a one group of six teams.

Pos	Team	Pld	W	D	L	GF	GA	GD	Pts
1	Brazil	5	5	0	0	36	2	+34	15
2	United States	5	3	1	1	21	12	+9	10
3	Argentina	5	3	1	1	11	6	+5	10
4	Canada	5	2	0	3	10	18	−8	6
5	Mexico	5	1	0	4	19	29	−10	3
6	Venezuela	5	0	0	5	2	32	−30	0

Source: The results of the table were determined from the results
Rules for classification: Tie-breaking criteria
18 October 2010
13:30

Brazil	11–1	Mexico
	Report

18 October 2010
15:30

Canada	1–6	United States
	Report

18 October 2010
17:30

Argentina	3–0	Venezuela
	Report

20 October 2010
13:30

Brazil	5–0	United States
	Report

20 October 2010
15:30

Argentina	4–0	Mexico
	Report

20 October 2010
17:30

Canada	4–0	Venezuela
	Report

22 October 2010
13:30

Argentina	1–0	Canada
	Report

22 October 2010
15:30

Brazil	12–0	Venezuela
	Report

22 October 2010
17:30

United States	8–4	Mexico
	Report

24 October 2010
13:30

Venezuela	2–10	Mexico
	Report

24 October 2010
15:30

Argentina	2–2	United States
	Report

24 October 2010
17:30

Brazil	7–0	Canada
	Report

26 October 2010
13:00

Mexico	4–5	Canada
	Report

26 October 2010
15:00

Venezuela	0–5	United States
	Report

26 October 2010
16:00

Argentina	1–4	Brazil
	Report

== Statistics ==
=== Ranking ===
Rank	Team
Gold medal	Brazil
Silver medal	United States
Bronze medal	Argentina
4.	Canada
5.	Mexico
6.	Venezuela
