= 2018 IFCPF CP Football Americas Championship =

2018 sporting event

Tournament details
- Host country: Ecuador
- Dates: 27 October – 3 November 2018
- Teams: 8
- Venue: 1 (in 1 host city)

Final positions
- Champions: Brazil
- Runners-up: Argentina
- Third place: United States
- Fourth place: Colombia

Tournament statistics
- Matches played: 20

The 2018 IFCPF CP Football Americas Championship was an American championship for men's national 7-a-side association football teams. IFCPF stands for International Federation of Cerebral Palsy Football. Athletes with a physical disability competed. The Championship took place in Ecuador from 27 October to 3 November 2018.

CP Football was played with modified FIFA rules. Among the modifications were that there were seven players, no offside, a smaller playing field, and permission for one-handed throw-ins. Matches consisted of two thirty-minute halves, with a fifteen-minute half-time break. The Championships was a qualifying event for the 2019 IFCPF CP Football World Championships.

== Participating teams and officials ==
=== Teams ===
Means of qualification	Berths	Qualified
Host nation	1	Ecuador
Americas Region	7	Argentina; Brazil; Canada; Chile; Colombia; United States; Venezuela
Total	8	

=== The draw ===
During the draw, the teams were divided into pots because of rankings. Here, the following groups:

	Group A	Group B
Pot 1	Brazil	Argentina
Pot 2	Canada	United States
Pot 3	Chile	Venezuela
Pot 4	Colombia	Ecuador

=== Squads ===
The individual teams contact following football gamblers on to:

Group A

Brazil	Canada	Chile	Colombia

Group B

Argentina	United States	Venezuela	Ecuador

== Venues ==
The venues to be used for the Americas Championships were located in Sangolquí.

Sangolquí	2018 IFCPF CP Football Americas Championship is located in Ecuador
Stadium: Estadio Rumiñahui (Club: C.S.D. Independiente del Valle)	2018 IFCPF CP Football Americas Championship is located in Ecuador
Capacity: 8,000	2018 IFCPF CP Football Americas Championship is located in Ecuador

== Format ==
The group stage was a competition between the 8 teams divided among two groups of four, where each group engaged in a round-robin tournament within itself.

Tie-breaking criteria for group play
The ranking of teams in each group was based on the following criteria:
1. Number of points
2. Goal difference
3. Number of goals scored
4. Number of points obtained in matches between tied teams
5. Goal difference in matches between tied teams
6. Number of goals scored in matches between tied teams
7. Drawing of lots

The first-placed teams played in the final for the first place, the next two teams played for the position five to eight.

Classification
Athletes with a physical disability competed. The athlete's disability was caused by a non-progressive brain damage that affects motor control, such as cerebral palsy, traumatic brain injury or stroke. Athletes must be ambulant.

Players were classified by level of disability.

- C5: Athletes with difficulties when walking and running, but not in standing or when kicking the ball.
- C6: Athletes with control and co-ordination problems of their upper limbs, especially when running.
- C7: Athletes with hemiplegia.
- C8: Athletes with minimal disability; must meet eligibility criteria and have an impairment that has impact on the sport of football.

Teams must field at least one class C5 or C6 player at all times. No more than two players of class C8 are permitted to play at the same time.

== Group stage ==
The group stage, have seen the 8 teams divided into two groups of four teams.

=== Group A ===
Pos	Team	Pld	W	D	L	GF	GA	GD	Pts	Qualified for
1	Brazil	3	3	0	0	19	1	+18	9	Team play for the position 1 - 4
2	Colombia	3	1	1	1	3	5	−2	4	Team play for the position 1 - 4
3	Canada	3	1	1	1	3	13	−10	4	Team play for the position 5 - 8
4	Chile	3	0	0	3	1	7	−6	0	Team play for the position 5 - 8

Source: IFCPF CP Football 2018 Americas Championship
Rules for classification: Tie-breaking criteria
27 October 2018
14:00

Brazil	4–0 (2–0)	Chile
	Report

27 October 2018
16:00

Canada	1–1 (1–1)	Colombia
	Report

28 October 2018
14:00

Colombia	1–4 (0–1)	Brazil
	Report

28 October 2018
16:00

Chile	1–2 (0–1)	Canada
	Report

30 October 2018
14:00

Brazil	11–0 (4–0)	Canada
	Report

30 October 2018
14:00

Chile	0–1 (0–0)	Colombia
	Report

=== Group B ===
Pos	Team	Pld	W	D	L	GF	GA	GD	Pts	Qualified for
1	Argentina	3	3	0	0	20	3	+17	9	Team play for the position 1 - 4
2	United States	3	2	0	1	16	3	+13	6	Team play for the position 1 - 4
3	Venezuela	3	1	0	2	11	19	−8	3	Team play for the position 5 - 8
4	Ecuador	3	0	0	3	4	26	−22	0	Team play for the position 5 - 8

Source: IFCPF CP Football 2018 Americas Championship
Rules for classification: Tie-breaking criteria
27 October 2018
14:00

United States	5–1 (2–0)	Venezuela
	Report

27 October 2018
16:00

Argentina	7–1 (4–1)	Ecuador
	Report

28 October 2018
14:00

Ecuador	1–11 (0–6)	United States
	Report

28 October 2018
16:00

Venezuela	2–12 (2–5)	Argentina
	Report

30 October 2018
16:15

United States	0–1 (0–0)	Argentina
	Report

30 October 2018
16:15

Venezuela	8–2 (4–2)	Ecuador
	Report

== Knockout stage ==
=== Semi-finals ===
Position 5-8

1 November 2018
14:00

Venezuela	2–1 (1–0)	Chile
	Report

1 November 2018
16:15

Canada	2–1 (2–1)	Ecuador
	Report

Position 1-4

1 November 2018
14:00

Argentina	6–0 (2–0)	Colombia
	Report

1 November 2018
16:15

Brazil	2–1 (0–0)	United States
	Report

== Finals ==
Position 7-8

3 November 2018
9:30

Chile	7–3 (1–1)	Ecuador
	Report

Position 5-6

3 November 2018
11:00

Venezuela	8–1 (4–0)	Canada
	Report

Position 3-4

3 November 2018
11:00

Colombia	0–3 (0–1)	United States
	Report

Final

3 November 2018
11:30

Argentina	2–4 (1–3)	Brazil
	Report

== Statistics ==
=== Ranking ===
Rank	Team
Gold medal	Brazil
Silver medal	Argentina
Bronze medal	United States
4.	Colombia
5.	Venezuela
6.	Canada
7.	Chile
8.	Ecuador
