= Football 7-a-side at the 2016 Summer Paralympics – Men's team squads =

The following is a list of squads for each nation competing in football 7-a-side at the 2016 Summer Paralympics in Rio de Janeiro.

== Group A ==
=== Brazil ===
The following is the Brazil squad in the football 7-a-side tournament of the 2016 Summer Paralympics.

No.	Pos.	Player	Date of birth (age)
1	GK	Marcos dos Santos Ferreira	4 July 1978 (aged 38)
2	DF	Jônatas Santos Machado	25 October 1992 (aged 23)
3	DF	Fernandes Alves Vieira	6 September 1979 (aged 37)
4	FW	José Carlos Monteiro Guimarães	22 May 1978 (aged 38)
5	DF	Diego Delgado da Silva	4 March 1996 (aged 20)
6	DF	Fabrizio Nascimento	17 January 1996 (aged 20)
7	DF	Igor Romero	16 February 1996 (aged 20)
8	MF	Hudson Hyure	5 October 1996 (aged 19)
9	FW	Wesley Martins de Souza	3 October 1989 (aged 26)
10	FW	Wanderson Silva de Oliveira	27 August 1987 (aged 29)
11	MF	Leandrinho	1 April 1993 (aged 23)
12	GK	Gilvano Diniz	27 March 1984 (aged 32)
13	MF	Maycon Ferreira	1 March 1990 (aged 26)
14	DF	Felipe Rafael da Silva	21 June 1994 (aged 22)

=== Great Britain ===
The following is the Great Britain squad in the football 7-a-side tournament of the 2016 Summer Paralympics.

No.	Pos.	Player	Date of birth (age)
1	GK	Giles Moore	19 June 1997 (aged 19)
2	DF	Liam Irons	17 December 1990 (aged 25)
3	DF	Martin Hickman	4 April 1989 (aged 27)
4	DF	Matt Crossen	10 June 1990 (aged 26)
5	MF	Jack Rutter	22 November 1990 (aged 25)
6	FW	Emyle Rudder	28 July 1994 (aged 22)
7	DF	Michael Barker	28 July 1987 (aged 29)
8	MF	Sean Highdale	4 March 1991 (aged 25)
9	MF	David Porcher	3 February 1997 (aged 19)
10	MF	Jon Paterson	15 January 1988 (aged 28)
11	FW	Ollie Nugent	19 October 1997 (aged 18)
12	MF	David Leavy	3 January 1992 (aged 24)
13	GK	Ryan Kay	24 August 1996 (aged 20)
14	FW	James Blackwell	2 April 1986 (aged 30)

=== Ireland ===
The following is the Ireland squad in the football 7-a-side tournament of the 2016 Summer Paralympics.

No.	Pos.	Player	Date of birth (age)
1	GK	Brian McGillivary	14 October 1988 (aged 27)
2	DF	Joseph Markey	27 May 1987 (aged 29)
3	DF	Conor Tuite	26 June 1997 (aged 19)
4	DF	Luke Evans	19 January 1990 (aged 26)
5	DF	Eric O'Flaherty	28 December 1994 (aged 21)
6	DF	Ryan Walker	13 December 1996 (aged 19)
7	MF	Gary Messett	1 September 1987 (aged 29)
8	GK	Aaron Tier	18 January 1995 (aged 21)
9	FW	Ryan Nolan	10 March 1992 (aged 24)
10	FW	Dillon Sheridan	5 February 1997 (aged 19)
11	FW	Tomiwa Badun	7 May 1997 (aged 19)
12	FW	Peter Cotter	21 February 1996 (aged 20)
13	FW	Cormac Birt	17 May 1996 (aged 20)
14	FW	Carl McKee	8 April 1998 (aged 18)

=== Ukraine ===
The following is the Ukraine squad in the football 7-a-side tournament of the 2016 Summer Paralympics.

No.	Pos.	Player	Date of birth (age)
1	GK	Kostiantyn Symashko	12 November 1980 (aged 35)
2	DF	Vitaliy Trushev	18 April 1983 (aged 33)
3	DF	Yevhen Zinoviev	15 December 1987 (aged 28)
4	DF	Taras Dutko	27 January 1982 (aged 34)
5	MF	Oleh Len	27 October 1990 (aged 25)
6	DF	Edhar Kahramanian	13 July 1984 (aged 32)
7	FW	Vitalii Romanchuk	14 January 1986 (aged 30)
8	FW	Ivan Dotsenko	16 May 1984 (aged 32)
9	MF	Dmytro Molodtsov	14 October 1984 (aged 31)
10	FW	Stanislav Podolksyi	19 February 1987 (aged 29)
11	MF	Volodymyr Antonyuk	10 May 1979 (aged 37)
12	GK	Bohdan Kulynych	9 January 1992 (aged 24)
13	MF	Artem Krasylnykov	6 April 1991 (aged 25)
14	MF	Ivan Shkvarlo	22 July 1988 (aged 28)

== Group B ==
=== Argentina ===
The following is the Argentina squad in the football 7-a-side tournament of the 2016 Summer Paralympics.

No.	Pos.	Player	Date of birth (age)
1	GK	Gustavo Nahuelquin	1 November 1979 (aged 36)
2	DF	Rodrigo Lúquez	16 November 1989 (aged 26)
3	MF	Mariano Cortés	4 August 1995 (aged 21)
4	DF	Carlos Carrizo	4 August 1999 (aged 17)
5	MF	Pablo Molina López	26 September 1986 (aged 29)
6	DF	Maximiliano Fernández	11 September 1990 (aged 25)
7	MF	Rodrigo Lugrin	6 December 1993 (aged 22)
8	MF	Mariano Morana	26 June 1991 (aged 25)
9	FW	Duncan Coronel	6 August 1998 (aged 18)
10	MF	Matías Bassi	30 August 1996 (aged 20)
11	FW	Matías Fernández Romano	13 August 1984 (aged 32)
12	GK	Claudio Figuera	14 March 1988 (aged 28)
13	DF	Matías Vera	15 August 1996 (aged 20)
14	FW	Matías Salvat	8 May 1995 (aged 21)

=== Iran ===
The following is the Iran squad in the football 7-a-side tournament of the 2016 Summer Paralympics.

No.	Pos.	Player	Date of birth (age)
1	GK	Moslem Khazaeipirsarabi	1 December 1986 (aged 29)
2	DF	Hashem Rastegarimobin	10 May 1985 (aged 31)
3	DF	Lotfollah Jangjou	17 December 1986 (aged 29)
4	DF	Hassan Safari	22 September 1992 (aged 23)
5	MF	Sadegh Hassani Baghi	12 November 1983 (aged 32)
6	MF	Farzad Mehri	30 October 1984 (aged 31)
7	FW	Behnam Sohrabi	1 January 1986 (aged 30)
8	MF	Hossein Tiz Bor	26 December 1994 (aged 21)
9	MF	Mehdi Jamali	31 May 1991 (aged 25)
10	MF	Jasem Bakhshi	4 June 1988 (aged 28)
11	FW	Rasoul Atashafrouz	7 May 1982 (aged 34)
12	DF	Mohammad Kharat	11 March 1989 (aged 27)
13	MF	Moslem Akbari	31 October 1984 (aged 31)
39	GK	Babak Safarikourabbasloo	9 September 1991 (aged 24)

=== Netherlands ===
The following is the Netherlands squad in the football 7-a-side tournament of the 2016 Summer Paralympics.

No.	Pos.	Player	Date of birth (age)
1	GK	Stefan Boersma	19 October 1994 (aged 21)
2	FW	Jeroen Saedt	10 October 1994 (aged 21)
3	DF	Jeroen Schuitert	29 December 1992 (aged 23)
4	MF	Thomas Kleinlugtebeld	15 December 1987 (aged 28)
5	DF	Teddy Witjes	20 September 1996 (aged 19)
6	MF	Peter Kooij	29 December 1986 (aged 29)
7	MF	Minne de Vos	21 May 1994 (aged 22)
8	DF	Lars Conijn	5 May 1993 (aged 23)
10	MF	Daniel Dikken	24 September 1991 (aged 24)
11	FW	Iljas Visker	1 January 1992 (aged 24)
12	FW	Gerard Bambacht	21 July 1999 (aged 17)
14	MF	Guido Floors	16 May 1992 (aged 24)
15	DF	Joey Mense	3 September 1990 (aged 26)
23	GK	George van Altena	23 April 1988 (aged 28)

=== United States ===
The following is the United States squad in the football 7-a-side tournament of the 2016 Summer Paralympics.

No.	Pos.	Player	Date of birth (age)
1	GK	Sean Boyle	27 March 1995 (aged 21)
2	DF	Gavin Sibayan	3 January 1981 (aged 35)
3	MF	Greg Brigman	27 February 1987 (aged 29)
4	MF	Tyler Bennett	27 June 1992 (aged 24)
5	DF	Bryce Boarman	29 August 1990 (aged 26)
6	MF	Steven Bohlemann	18 January 1989 (aged 27)
7	MF	Adam Ballou	29 May 1992 (aged 24)
8	FW	Andrew Bremer	22 November 1995 (aged 20)
9	FW	Seth Jahn	25 December 1982 (aged 33)
10	MF	Kevin Hensley	24 May 1992 (aged 24)
11	FW	Mason Abbiate	24 June 1998 (aged 18)
12	GK	Alex Hendricks	13 April 1996 (aged 20)
13	MF	Josh Brunais	7 April 1987 (aged 29)
14	DF	David Garza	24 April 1993 (aged 23)

== See also ==
- Football 5-a-side at the 2016 Summer Paralympics – Team squads
