= IFCPF World Cup =

Main competition of CP football

The IFCPF World Cup (formerly known as the IFCPF CP Football World Championships) is the main world competition of CP football.

== History ==
The first CPISRA World Championships took place in Denmark in 1982, four years after the first international competition for the sport took place in Scotland at the Cerebral Palsy International Games.

7-a-side football was also played at the Paralympic Games, making its debut at the 1984 Summer Paralympics. It was dropped from the Paralympic program for the 2020 Summer Paralympics.

Names

- 1982, 1986: CPISRA International Cerebral Palsy Games
- 1989, 1997, 2001, 2005: CPISRA World Games
- 1990, 1994, 1998, 2003, 2007, 2011: CPISRA World Championships
- 2009: CPISRA International Championships
- 2013: CPISRA International Cup
- 2015: IFCPF CP Football World Championships
- 2017: IFCPF World Championships
- 2019–2024: IFCPF World Cup

== Men's results ==
Year	Host	Winner	Score	Runner-up	Third place	Score	Fourth place	Number of teams	Ref.
CPISRA tournaments
1982; Details	(Denmark); Greve (WC)	(Republic of Ireland); Ireland		Netherlands	Belgium			3(4)	
1986; Details	(Belgium); Gits (WC)	Netherlands	3–0	Belgium	(Republic of Ireland); Ireland		Portugal	5(6)	
1989; Details	(England); Nottingham (WC)	Netherlands	1–0	(Republic of Ireland); Ireland	England			3	
1990; Details	(Netherlands); Assen (WC)	Netherlands	5–0	(Republic of Ireland); Ireland	Belgium		England or United States	5	
1994; Details	(Republic of Ireland); Dublin (WC)	Netherlands	2–0	(Republic of Ireland); Ireland	Belgium		Spain	7(8)	
1997; Details	(Netherlands); Delden (WC)	Russia		Portugal	Netherlands	2–1	Ukraine	9(10)	
1998; Details	(Brazil); Rio de Janeiro (WC)	Ukraine	3–1	Russia	Brazil	3–2	Spain	11	
2001; Details	(England); Nottingham (WC)	Ukraine	3–1	Russia	Brazil	2–0	Iran	13	
2003; Details	(Argentina); Buenos Aires (WC)	Ukraine	3–1	Brazil	Russia	2–1	Argentina	11	
2005; Details	(United States); New London (WC)	Ukraine	3–0	Russia	Iran	9–0	Netherlands	13	
2007; Details	(Brazil); Rio de Janeiro (WC)	Russia	2–1	Iran	Ukraine	2–0	Brazil	16	
2009; Details	(Netherlands); Arnhem (IC)	Ukraine	0–0 (a.e.t.) (9–8 p.)	Russia	Iran	1–0	Brazil	12	
2011; Details	(Netherlands); Assen, Emmen, Hoogeveen (WC)	Russia	6–1	Iran	Ukraine	8–3	Brazil	16	
2013; Details	(Spain); Sant Cugat del Vallès (Cup)	Ukraine	1–0	Brazil	Russia	4–0	(Republic of Ireland); Ireland	16	
IFCPF tournaments
2015; Details	(England); Burton-upon-Trent (WC)	Russia	1–0	Ukraine	Brazil	6–0	Netherlands	16	
2017; Details	(Argentina); San Luis (WC)	Ukraine	1–0	Iran	Russia	2–0	England	16	
2019; Details	(Spain); Seville (Cup)	Russia	3–1	Ukraine	Brazil	4–1	England	16	
2022; Details	(Spain); Salou (Cup)	Ukraine	1–0	Iran	Brazil	2–0	United States	15	
2024; Details	(Spain); Salou (Cup)	Iran	3–0	Ukraine	Netherlands	3–1	Brazil	15	
2026; Details	(United States); Georgia (Cup)	England	2–1 (AET)	(United States); USA	Brazil	3–0	Spain	12	

=== Medal table ===
Rank	Nation	Gold	Silver	Bronze	Total
1	Ukraine (UKR)	8	3	2	13
2	Russia (RUS)	5	4	3	12
3	Netherlands (NED)	4	1	2	7
4	Iran (IRI)	1	4	2	7
5	Ireland (IRL)	1	3	1	5
6	England (ENG)	1	0	1	2
7	Brazil (BRA)	0	2	6	8
8	Belgium (BEL)	0	1	3	4
9	Portugal (POR)	0	1	0	1
9	United States (USA)	0	1	0	1
Totals (10 entries)		20	20	20	60

== Second Level IFCPF World Championships ==
The event was held from 27 September to 3 October 2022 in Olbia, Italy.

Ranking:

- 1st Colombia
- 2nd Scotland
- 3rd Japan
- 4th Chile
- 5th Italy
- 6th Egypt
- 7th South Korea
- 8th Denmark

== See also ==
- IFCPF Women's World Cup
