= 1995 CPISRA Pan-American Soccer Championship =

Tournament details
- Host country: Argentina

Final positions
- Champions: United States
- Runners-up: Argentina
- Third place: Brazil
- Fourth place: Chile

The 1995 CPISRA Pan-American Soccer Championship was an American championship for men's national 7-a-side association football teams. CPISRA stands for Cerebral Palsy International Sports & Recreation Association. Athletes with a physical disability competed.

Football 7-a-side was played with modified FIFA rules. Among the modifications were that there were seven players, no offside, a smaller playing field, and permission for one-handed throw-ins. Matches consisted of two thirty-minute halves, with a fifteen-minute half-time break. The Championships was a qualifying event for the 1998 CPISRA Soccer World Championships.

== Participating teams and officials ==
=== Teams ===
Means of qualification	Berths	Qualified
Host nation	1	Argentina
Americas Region	3	Brazil; Chile; United States
Total	4	

=== Squads ===
The individual teams contact following football gamblers on to:

Argentina	Brazil	Chile	United States

== Venues ==
The venues to be used for the World Championships were located in Buenos Aires.

Buenos Aires	1995 CPISRA Pan-American Soccer Championship is located in Argentina
Stadium: unknown	1995 CPISRA Pan-American Soccer Championship is located in Argentina
Capacity: unknown	1995 CPISRA Pan-American Soccer Championship is located in Argentina

== Format ==
In the group stage was a competition between the 4 teams in one group, where engaged in a round-robin tournament within itself.

Tie-breaking criteria for group play
The ranking of teams in each group was based on the following criteria:
1. Number of points
2. Goal difference
3. Number of goals scored
4. Number of points obtained in matches between tied teams
5. Goal difference in matches between tied teams
6. Number of goals scored in matches between tied teams
7. Drawing of lots

Classification
Athletes with a physical disability competed. The athlete's disability was caused by a non-progressive brain damage that affects motor control, such as cerebral palsy, traumatic brain injury or stroke. Athletes must be ambulant.

Players were classified by level of disability.

- C5: Athletes with difficulties when walking and running, but not in standing or when kicking the ball.
- C6: Athletes with control and co-ordination problems of their upper limbs, especially when running.
- C7: Athletes with hemiplegia.
- C8: Athletes with minimal disability; must meet eligibility criteria and have an impairment that has impact on the sport of football.

Teams must field at least one class C5 or C6 player at all times. No more than two players of class C8 are permitted to play at the same time.

== Group stage ==
In the group stage have seen the teams in a one group of four teams.

Pos	Team	Pld	W	D	L	GF	GA	GD	Pts
1	United States*	0	0	0	0	0	0	0	0
2	Argentina*	0	0	0	0	0	0	0	0
3	Brazil*	0	0	0	0	0	0	0	0
4	Chile*	0	0	0	0	0	0	0	0

Source: no more detailed information about the table stand available
The teams with * the placement is presumed due to the available results.
Rules for classification: Tie-breaking criteria

–

–

–

–

–

–

== Statistics ==
=== Ranking ===
Rank	Team
Gold medal	United States
Silver medal	Argentina
Bronze medal	Brazil
4.	Chile
