= Josh McKinney =

American paralympic soccer player

Personal information
- Place of birth: West Virginia
- Height: 6 ft 3 in (1.91 m)
- Position: Midfielder

College career
Years	Team	Apps	(Gls)
2001	Concord Mountain Lions		

International career
1995–2014	United States (CP)	124	(81)

Joshua McKinney is an American former Paralympic soccer player who played as a midfielder. McKinney, who has cerebral palsy, was the first member of disability teams to be inducted into the National Soccer Hall of Fame.

== Early and personal life ==
McKinney was born in West Virginia and raised in Hilton Head Island, South Carolina. His brothers Chris and Jeff were college soccer players for West Virginia University and Davidson College, respectively. His grandfather Paul McKinney, known as "Cigar", won a World Series of Poker bracelet.

Born with cerebral palsy affecting the right side of his body, McKinney began playing soccer at age 5 and played for club and high school sides alongside able-bodied players. As his disability affected his running, he practiced his passing and positioning as a way to compensate.

== Career ==
When McKinney was 16 in 1995, he saw an advertisement for the United States men's national cerebral palsy soccer team. He submitted a video and was chosen for the 1995 CPISRA Pan-American Soccer Championship in Argentina. He scored four goals in an opening 5–4 win over Brazil, his first game against fellow disabled players. McKinney scored five goals as the United States reached a best-ever fourth place in the 7-a-side soccer at the 1996 Summer Paralympics.

McKinney played college soccer at Concord University and became captain of the United States national cerebral palsy team, competing at the Paralympics in 2004 and 2012. Having obtained 124 caps and 81 goals, he retired in 2014 at age 35, affected by arthritis in his ankles.

== Retirement and Hall of Fame ==
After retiring, McKinney settled in Raleigh, North Carolina and coached able-bodied children at North Carolina FC, while working on introducing cerebral palsy soccer to the local area. In 2020, the National Soccer Hall of Fame allowed Paralympic, futsal and beach soccer players to be nominated, and McKinney was on the ballot from 2021; he had previously been inducted into the soccer halls of fame of West Virginia and North Carolina. He was inducted to the National Soccer Hall of Fame in 2024, the first player from the aforementioned teams to be inducted. McKinney said that he hoped his induction would raise awareness of disability soccer.
