= Tyler Bennett =

American Paralympic footballer

Personal information
- Born: June 27, 1992 (age 34) Akron, Ohio, U.S.
- Height: 5 ft 9 in (175 cm)

Sport
- Country: United States
- Sport: CP soccer
Medal record
CP soccer
CPISRA Football 7-a-side American Cup
Silver medal – second place	2010 Buenos Aires	Team

Tyler Bennett (born June 27, 1992) is an American Paralympic footballer from Akron, Ohio who won a silver medal in 2010 at the 2010 CPISRA Football 7-a-side American Cup. He also competed at the 2016 Summer Paralympics. He used to attend University of Akron and as of 2017 he began attending Clemson University where he joined a soccer residency program for Paralympic athletes.
