= Alex Hendricks =

American cerebral palsy football player (born 1996)

Personal information
- Nationality: United States
- Born: April 13, 1996 (age 30) Columbus, Ohio
- Education: Ashland University
- Height: 1.9304 m (6 ft 4 in)

Sport
- Sport: Soccer / Cerebral palsy soccer

Achievements and titles
- Paralympic finals: 2012 Summer Paralympics, 2016 Summer Paralympics
Medal record
Paralympic 7-a-side football
BT Paralympic World Cup
Bronze medal – third place	2012 Manchester	Men's
2014 CPISRA Football 7-a-side American Cup
Bronze medal – third place	2014 Toronto	Men's
- Updated on 7 April 2018

Alexander William Hendricks (born April 13, 1996) is an American soccer player with cerebral palsy. He has paralysis on the left side of his body as a result of complications from a brain biopsy that created 2 strokes and a brain hemorrhage when he was 13 years old.

Hendricks plays cerebral palsy soccer for the USPNT. After being called up in 2011, he has won a bronze medal at the 2012 BT Paralympic World Cup in Manchester, England, and went on to participate at 2012 Summer Paralympics where the USPNT lost all 5 games they played. Following those Games, he has continued to be called up to the national team, including the 2014 American Cup in Toronto, Canada of which the USPNT won a bronze medal. More recently he joined the USPNT for the 2016 Pre Paralympic Tournament in Salou, Spain. He then went on to participate at 2016 Summer Paralympics where the USPNT won 1 game, tied 1 game and lost 2 games.

== Personal ==
Born on April 13, 1996, Hendricks is from Columbus, Ohio. In December 2008, when Hendricks was 13 years old, he became paralyzed on his left side as a result of complications from a brain biopsy that created 2 strokes and a brain hemorrhage. Prior to his medical issues, he was actively involved with sports including soccer. He continues to have partial paralysis in his left foot.

Hendricks went to Worthington Kilbourne High School, and was a junior in 2012. After graduating, he attended Ashland University, and was a freshman in 2014 and was majoring computer science. Outside of school and soccer, his major hobbies were reading and playing video games. Although Alex Hendricks is listed as graduating from Ashland University in 2018 on the United States Paralympics website, he is not listed as graduated on his Merit Page profile nor included in Meritpage's Ashland University's list of graduates.

== Soccer ==
Hendricks started playing soccer when he was 3 years old. While playing for his club team in 2008, he suffered a concussion. As a result, he was given a CT scan that revealed he had brain tumors.

== Cerebral palsy soccer ==
Hendricks is a CP7 goalkeeper and forward.

In November 2011, Hendricks was called up to the United States national team. He participated in the 2012 BT Paralympic World Cup in Manchester, England, where his team came away with a bronze medal. He was a sub on the bench in the US's last game of that competition. He also participated in the 2012 Ukraine International Tournament.

Hendricks was named to the 12 man roster to represent the United States at the 2012 Summer Paralympics, where, at 16 years old, he was the youngest member of the team. The high school junior was one of two players from Ohio on the squad. The United States was drawn in Group B with Ukraine, Great Britain and Brazil. Their opener was against reigning Paralympic gold medal winners Ukraine. Hendricks was in goal for the United States's 0 - 4 loss to Great Britain. The Americans finished the tournament without winning a single game, losing all 5 matches they played in.

Following the Games, Hendricks continued to be a national team fixture. He was one of two goalkeepers who participated in a national team training camp in March 2013 at the U.S. Olympic Training Center in Chula Vista, California. In April 2014, he was invited to participate in a week long national team training camp at the Olympic Training Center in Chula Vista, California. The camp was being held in preparation for the 7-a-side Football Ciutat de Barcelona in June of that year. Hendricks also competed at the 2014 American Cup in Toronto.

In March 2015, Hendricks was part of the 14 man roster that participated in the Povoa de Varzim, Portugal hosted Footie 7 – Povoa 2015 tournament. The competition was a warmup for the World Championships that were held in England in June 2015. He was invited to a national team training camp that took place from April 29 to May 6, 2015, in Carson, California. This camp was in preparation for the 2015 Cerebral Palsy Football World Championships in June of that year in England. As the Rio Games got closer, he continued to be part of the national team. He took part in a national team training camp in Chula Vista, California in early March 2016. Hendricks was also part of the United States national 7-a-side soccer team that took part in the 2016 Pre Paralympic Tournament in Salou, Spain. The United States finished 6th after beating Argentina in one placement match 4 - 3 and losing to Ireland 4 - 1. The goals scored in the match against Argentina were the first the USA scored in the tournament, before putting up one more in their match against Ireland. The tournament featured 7 of the 8 teams participating in Rio. It was the last major preparation event ahead of the Rio Games for all teams participating.
