= Andrew Bremer =

American Paralympic soccer player

Personal information
- Nickname: NASCAR
- Nationality: United States
- Born: November 22, 1995 (age 30) Grand Rapids, Michigan
- Height: 6 ft 2 in (188 cm)
- Weight: 196 lb (89 kg)

Sport
- Sport: Soccer / Cerebral palsy soccer
- College team: Kalamazoo College
- Updated on 18 June 2016

Andrew Bremer (born November 22, 1995) is an American Paralympic soccer player. He attended East Grand Rapids High School and Kalamazoo College, playing varsity soccer for both schools. In 2015, Bremer started playing cerebral palsy football as a member of the United States national team. His first call up was in June 2015, and he has consistently participated in national team camps and tournaments since. Bremer was one of a number of players seeking a spot on the national team roster for the 2016 Summer Paralympics in Rio.

Bremer also represented the U.S. in the 2017 IFCPF World Championships and THE 2018 America's Cup.

== Personal ==
Bremer was born on November 22, 1995 in Grand Rapids, Michigan, with hemiplegic cerebral palsy, a condition which effects the right side of his body. He attended East Grand Rapids High School. After graduating in 2013, he enrolled at Kalamazoo College, where he is majoring in economics and business and minoring in mathematics. Bremer made the Dean's List for the Winter 2015 term, and is scheduled to graduate in 2017.

Growing up, Bremer participated in a number of sports, including hockey, basketball, baseball and swimming. Prior to becoming a member of the US national CP football team, Bremer had flown only once in his life.

== Soccer ==
Bremer played soccer for East Grand Rapids High School in Michigan for three seasons as a defender or central midfielder. His coach asserted that he never believed Bremer's cerebral palsy impacted his on field performance. During his high school varsity career, he scored 6 goals. One was in 2012 against Caledonia High School, another in 2012 was against Grand Rapids Forest Hills Central. He also scored in the 2011 season against Grand Rapids Northview. The goal against Caledonia took place in a match that ended tied 3 - 3.

As a college junior, Bremer started university soccer for Kalamazoo College in the 2015–2016 season where he wore number 13. He appeared in three games, where he had two shots on goal playing as a midfielder. He made his first collegiate start against Trine University in the 2016 season. He appeared in 9 games in 2016, registering one assist in a game against Olivet College.

== Cerebral palsy football ==
Bremer is a CP7 footballer, taking up the sport in 2015 as a 19-year-old after seeing a Tweet about the Paralympic team during the FIFA Women's World Cup. When playing for the national team, he is a forward.

Bremer was invited to his first national team training camp in June 2015, flying there for the camp in Los Angeles in October 2015. He was back at camp again in November 2015.

In January 2016, Bremer continued his involvement with the national team and his path towards Rio by participating in a national team training camp in Florida. He attended another camp in April 2016 in Florida. Bremer was part of the United States national 7-a-side football team that took part in the 2016 Pre Paralympic Tournament in Salou, Spain. He featured in all 5 games, starting in 4 of the matches. The United States finished 6th after beating Argentina in one placement match 4 - 3 and losing to Ireland 4 - 1. The goals scored in the match against Argentina were the first the USA scored in the tournament before putting up one more in their match against Ireland. He scored the United States' first goal of the tournament when he put one in the 9th minute of their placement match against Argentina. He scored a second goal in the 52nd minute, and then picked up a yellow card 2 minutes later. The tournament featured 7 of the 8 teams participating in Rio. It was the last major preparation event ahead of the Rio Games for all teams participating.

In May 2016, Bremer was on track to be selected for the US national team going to the 2016 Summer Paralympics in Rio.
