= Canada national cerebral palsy soccer team =

National cerebral football team for Canada

Canada national cerebral palsy football team
- Federation: Canadian Soccer Association
- IFCPF ranking: 10
- Highest IFCPF ranking: 10 (2016)
- Lowest IFCPF ranking: 12 (July 2011, September 2012)

Parapan American Games
- Appearances: 2 (First in 2007)
- Best result: 3

Canada national cerebral palsy football team is the national cerebral football team for Canada that represents the team in international competitions. Canada has participated in a number of international tournaments and IFCPF World Championships. In the most recent edition they finished 10th, after losing their placement match to Scotland in extra time. They have appeared in one Paralympic Games, 1984.

== Background ==
Canadian Soccer Association oversees the national team. The sport was originally governed by the Canadian Cerebral Palsy Sports Association. The Canadian Soccer Association (CSA) began governing the team in 2005, with an initial player pool of 13 player. In 2011, the team was coached by Drew Ferguson. In this early period under CSA governance, the team was coached by Drew Ferguson. The team held nine national team camps and mini camps in 2011. This totals 4,732 player camp days. By the end of the 2011, the player pool for the national team exceeded 100 players. By 2016, Canada had a national championships to support the national team and was active in participating in the IFCPF World Championships.

National team development is supported by an International Federation of Cerebral Palsy Football (IFCPF) recognized national championship. Recognized years for the national IFCPF recognized competition include 2015.

== Ranking ==
Canada was ranked tenth in the world by the IFCPF in 2016. That same year, the team was also ranked fourth in the Americas. In August 2013 and November 2014, the team was ranked eleventh in the world. Canada was ranked twelfth in July 2011 and September 2012.

== Players ==
There have been a number of players for the Canadian squad.

Name	Classification	Years active	Ref
James Victor Ackinclose	FT8	2016	
Jeremy Nathan Baird	FT5	2016	
Matthew Brown	FT7	2016	
Lucas Bruno	FT7	2016	
Samuel Charron	FT7	2016	
Christopher Fawcett	FT7	2016	
Eric Flemming	FT5	2016	
Sean Freeman	FT8	2016	
Matt Gilbert	FT7	2016	
Evan Bohdan Haithwaite	FT7	2016	
Nicholas Heffernan	FT7	2016	
Dustin Hodgson	FT7	2016	
James Jordan	FT7	2016	
Ross Alan Macdonald	FT5	2016	
Brendon Keith Mcadam	FT8	2016	
Kyle Payne	FT7	2016	
John Phillips	FT7	2016	
Vito Proietti	FT5	2016	
Liam Stanley	FT7	2016	
Trevor Charles Stiles	FT8	2016	
Scott Van den Boogaard	FT7	2016	
Geoffrey Wakefield	FT8	2016	
Derek Whitson	FT5	2016	
Yuri Woodfall	FT5	2016	
Samuel Denton	FT6	2016	
Damien Wojtiw	FT6	2016	
Cory Johnson	FT6	2016	
Joseph Resendes	FT5	2016	
Dan Benoit	FT7	2016	
Raji Kamoun	FT6	2016	
Duncan McDonald	FT7	2016	

== Results ==
Canada has participated in a number of international tournaments. At the Football 7-a-side International Tournament in Portugal in 2011, Canada played four games. They defeated Portugal 7–0. They lost to the Netherlands 0–4. They defeated Mexico 3–2. They lost to the Netherlands 1–3. Six teams participated in the Toronto hosted American Cup in 2014. Group A included Venezuela, Argentina and Canada. Group B included Mexico, Brazil and the United States. The tournament was important for preparations for the 2015 Parapan American Games, and because it was the last major continental level competition of the year. The team was scheduled to participate in the 2016 IFCPF Qualification Tournament World Championships in Vejen, Denmark in early August. The tournament was part of the qualifying process for the 2017 IFCPF World Championships. Other teams scheduled to participate included Scotland, Portugal, Iran, Northern Ireland, Australia, Venezuela, Japan, Republic of South Korea, Germany, Denmark, and Spain.

Competition	Location	Year	Total Teams	Result	Ref
America Cup	Toronto, Canada	2014	6	4	
Intercontinental Cup	Barcelona, Spain	2013	16		
Défi Sportif Tournament	Canada	2013	4	3	
British Paralympic World Cup	Nottingham, England	2012	12		
7-a-side Futbol Tournament	Barcelona, Spain	2012		1	
Football 7-a-side International Tournament	Porto, Portugal	2011	4	2	
CPISRA International Championships	Arnhem, Netherlands	2009	11		
Parapan American Games		2007		3	

Canada has also played in a number of friendlies. In December 2011, Canada and the United States played a series of three friendly matches in Chula Vista, California. Canada won the opener 4 - 2. They then repeated this score in the second match. The United States won the third game 2 - 3.

In 2011, Canada finished with a record of eight wins and five losses in international play.

=== IFCPF World Championships ===
Canada has participated in the IFCPF World Championships. At the 2011 CP-ISRA World Championship in Drenthe, the Netherlands, Canada defeated Finland 6 - 0, Canada lost to Ukraine 0 - 5, Canada lost to Scotland 1 - 4, Canada beat Spain 3 - 2, Canada lost to Ireland 0 - 6 and Canada lost to Australia 0 - 2.

World Championships	Location	Total Teams	Result	Ref
2015 IFCPF World Championships	England	15	10 (2-2 after full-time, lost 5–3 against Scotland in extra time)	
2011 CPSIRA World Championships	Netherlands	16	12	
2009 CPISRA World Championships			13	
2007 CPISRA World Championships			15	

=== Paralympic Games ===
Canada has participated in 7-a-side football at the Paralympic Games. The team tried to qualify for the 2012 Summer Paralympics but were unable to do so.

Games	Results	Ref
1984 Summer Paralympics		
