= Adam Ballou =

American soccer player

Personal information
- Nationality: United States
- Born: May 29, 1992 (age 34) Virginia Beach, Virginia, United States
- Height: 1.72 m (5 ft 7 1/2 in)
- Weight: 155 lb (70 kg)

Sport
- Sport: Soccer / Cerebral palsy soccer

Achievements and titles
- Paralympic finals: 2012 Summer Paralympics
Medal record
Paralympic 7-a-side football
2010 Americas Championship
Silver medal – second place	Team	Men's
- Updated on 18 June 2016

Adam Ballou (born May 29, 1992) is an American soccer player and cerebral palsy football player. Ballou has cerebral palsy as a result of an intrauterine stroke, he was diagnosed at six months old. He attended James Madison University, graduating in 2015. He started playing soccer when he was three years old, played rec, advanced and travel. He also played on his high school varsity team, and was team captain his junior and senior years.

Ballou has been a consistent member of the United States Paralympic National Team since being invited to train with them in March 2007 as a 14-years-old. He has competed at the CP Football World Championships in 2009, 2011, and 2015. He has also represented the United States at the 2012 Summer Paralympics in London. His best performance with the team was a second-place finish at the 2010 Americas Championship.

== Personal ==
Ballou was born on May 29, 1992, in Virginia Beach, Virginia and has three sisters. Ballou was diagnosed with cerebral palsy when he was six months old, after he had a pediatric stroke. As a result of the stroke, when he was an infant, doctors told his parents that he might live his life as a vegetable. The stroke had resulted in him acquiring cerebral palsy and having limited limb functionality on his left side, making it substantially weaker than his right side. To address these physical issues, Ballou had regular physical therapy as a result until he was around 13 years old.

Ballou attended Norfolk Christian High School in Norfolk, graduating from there in 2011. He went on from there to study International Affairs and Spanish at James Madison University. He graduated in 2015, with a minors in business as well as Latin American and Caribbean Studies. While attending university, he took the spring semester of 2012 off so he could train with the US national team ahead of the London Games. He also studied abroad, spending a semester in Salamanca, Spain. In 2014, he completed an internship for U.S. State Department at the Embassy in Madrid in 2014 as part of his studies. He has continued to be involved with the university following his graduation. In April 2016, he gave a workshop on Paralympic sport at his alma mater's Godwin Hall in Harrisonburg

Ballou speaks Spanish and English. He is 5 foot 8 and weighs 155 pounds.

== Sports ==
Ballou started playing soccer when he was a three-year-old, playing for a team that included his sister and which his father was the coach of. He was able to compete in sports after he had a tendon transfer on his left foot. Many people in his life encouraged him to participate in sports. Because of his disability, he trained harder on that side of the body and sometimes feels he performs better on that side as a result. He played varsity soccer for Norfolk Christian High School. In 2012, his soccer coaches were Jay Hoffman and Mike Haas.

== Cerebral palsy football ==
Ballou is a CP7 footballer and a regular fixture on the US National Paralympic Team, where he plays in the midfield.

Ballou started playing CP football in 2007 after getting invited to train with the national team in March. At the time, he was 14 years old. He came to the attention of national selectors after the head coach of the Virginia Beach Mariners asked his coach if he knew of any players with cerebral palsy and his coach replied with Ballou's name and contact details. Because of the rules for CP football, he was not able to earn his first national team cap until he was 16 years old.

The United States tried but failed to qualify for the 2008 Summer Paralympics. If they had been successful, Ballou would likely have made the roster. He was part of the US team that finished 11th at the 2009 World Championships. He continued to get national team calls ups, and was with the US team that finished second at the 2010 Americas Championship. The following year, he participated in the 2011 CPISRA World Championships with the national team. An eighth-place finish at this tournament qualified the United States for the London Games.

Ballou spent much time preparing for the 2012 Summer Paralympics. When not with the national team, he trained at the Virginia Beach Sportsplex. Having taken a semester off to prepare for the Games, he spent much time in 2012 training with the national team in Chula Vista, California, and was formally chosen by national team head coach Jay Hoffman to be on the London bound national team.

The 2012 Games were his first, as the national team had not qualified for Beijing. Ballou was one of seven US Paralympians from Virginia competing in London, and his family flew to London to watch him play. 25,000 people showed up to watch his team play Great Britain. The United States was drawn in Group B with Ukraine, Great Britain and Brazil. The Americans did not win a single game, losing all 5 matches they played in. After the Games when he returned to the US, he was with the team when they met US President Barack Obama. His participation in London gave him the resolve to try to make the roster for the 2016 Games.

In April 2014, Ballou was invited to participate in a week long national team training camp at the Olympic Training Center in Chula Vista, California. The camp was being held in preparation for the 7-a-side Football Ciutat de Barcelona in June of that year. In March 2015, he was part of the 14-man roster that participated in the Povoa de Varzim, Portugal hosted Footie 7 – Povoa 2015 tournament. The competition was a warmup for the World Championships that were held in England in June 2015.

Ballou was named to the US side for the 2015 Cerebral Palsy World Championships in England in June 2015. Ballou came off the bench to substitute in for Michael Moore in the team's 10 - 0 loss to England. He started in the team's 2 - 1 win against Scotland. In the 7th/8th placement match, Argentine goalkeeper Gustavo Nahuelquin was red carded for kicking Ballou. Teammate David Garza then scored on the penalty kick. Ballou scored his own goal later in the game against Argentina. The United States won the game 4 - 1. This performance qualified the United States for the 2016 Summer Paralympics.

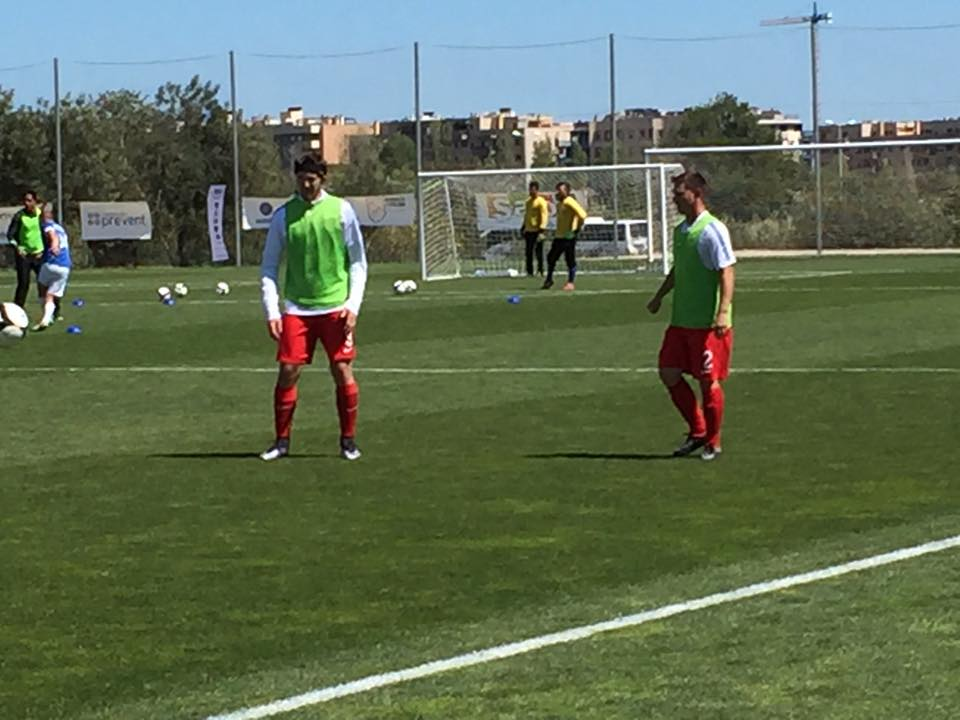
Adam Ballou, right, warms up with a teammate in preparation for the US's game against Brazil at a tournament in Salou in 2016.

Again, Ballou was called to participate on the national team after being named to the 14 man squad for the 2015 Parapan American Games in Toronto. There, the United States played Canada, Venezuela, Argentina and Brazil. He played in the team's match against Canada. He spent parts of 2015 and 2016 training full-time in preparation for the Rio Games.

Later that year, Ballou was nominated for the 2015 U.S. Soccer's Young Disabled Player of the Year alongside teammate Kevin Hensley and US national amputee football team players Nicolai Calabria and Noah Grove. He lost out Hensley in getting the honor.

2016 saw Ballou again getting invitations to play with the US Paralympic Team. He participated national team training camp in Chula Vista, California in early March 2016. Following that, Ballou was part of the US that took part in the 2016 Pre Paralympic Tournament in Salou, Spain. The United States finished 6th after beating Argentina in one placement match 4 - 3 and losing to Ireland 4 - 1. The goals scored in the match against Argentina were the first the USA scored in the tournament, before putting up one more in their match against Ireland. Ballou scored an own goal in the USA's game against Ireland. The tournament featured 7 of the 8 teams participating in Rio. It was the last major preparation event ahead of the Rio Games for all teams participating.
