= CP football =

Paralympic football for cerebral palsy

CP Football
- Highest governing body: CPISRA (1978–2014) / IFCPF (2015–)

Characteristics
- Mixed-sex: No
- Type: Outdoor

Presence
- Paralympic: 1984–2016

Cerebral Palsy Football, also called 7-a-side football or formerly Paralympic Football, is an adaptation of association football for athletes with cerebral palsy and other neurological disorders, including stroke and traumatic brain injury. From 1978 to 2014, cerebral palsy football was governed by the Cerebral Palsy International Sports and Recreation Association (CPISRA). In January 2015, governance of the sport was taken over by the International Federation of Cerebral Palsy Football, under the umbrella of Para Football.

The sport is played with modified FIFA rules. Among the modifications are a reduced field of play, a reduction in the number of players, elimination of the offside rule, and permission for one-handed throw-ins. Matches consist of two thirty-minute halves, with a fifteen-minute half-time break. Teams must field at least one class C5 or C6 player at all times. No more than one players of class C8 are permitted to play at the same time.

International competition in 7-a-side football began at the 1978 CP-ISRA International Games in Edinburgh, Scotland. The sport was added to the Summer Paralympic Games at the 1984 Summer Paralympics in New York City, U.S., and was played at every Summer Games until 2016.

== Governance ==
From 1978 to 2014, cerebral palsy football was governed by the Cerebral Palsy International Sports and Recreation Association (CPISRA). In January 2015, governance of the sport was taken over by the International Federation of Cerebral Palsy Football.

Different organizations govern the sport on a national level. In Australia, the sport is governed by Football Federation Australia, with the sport also having state governing bodies in the country. For New South Wales, this is Cerebral Palsy Sporting and Recreation Association NSW. In Queensland, it is Football Queensland. The sport is overseen by Football Federation South Australia in South Australia. In Victoria, it is run by Disability Sport and Recreation. In Western Australia, the sport is governed by Football West. In the Australian Capital Territory, the sport is governed by Capital Football. In Tasmania, the sport is run by Disability Sport and Recreation.

== Rule modifications ==
Field

While CP football generally follows many of the rules of association football, the sport includes a few modifications. These rules include a lack of an offside rule, and players being allowed to throw in the ball using only one hand. Throw-ins can be done using an underhand technique.

The game is also shorter, featuring two 30-minute halves with a 15-minute halftime break. It also includes only 7 players on the field for each team during play. The goal and the field are also smaller than the non-disability association football game. The field is 75 meters by 55 meters.

In tournament competition, playoff and finals games that end in a draw following regulation time have extra time added. This extra time consists of two 10-minute periods, where the first goal scored wins the game. If there is still a draw following those 20 minutes of play, a penalty shoot out takes place. 5 players from each time attempt to score from the place where penalty kicks take place. The team with the most goals following 5 shots each wins.

== Classification ==
Athletes competing in CP football have one of three impairment types; ataxia, hypertonia or athetosis. These impairments are of a cerebral nature and cause permanent and verifiable activity limitation. The classification system attempts to minimize the impact of impairments on sport performance and ensure the success of an athlete is determined by skill, fitness, power, endurance, tactical ability and mental focus.

Originally, classification for the sport was only open to people with cerebral palsy, but the classification system was changed. This opened up the sport to people with brain injuries and other motor function disorders who had functional participation similar to that of people with cerebral palsy.

Four classes participate in the sport. These classes are FT5, FT6, FT7 and FT8. The type of disability for each class is:

- FT5: Athletes with difficulties when walking and running, but not in standing or when kicking the ball.
- FT6: Athletes with control and co-ordination problems of their upper limbs, especially when running.
- FT7: Athletes with hemiplegia.
- FT8: Minimally disabled athletes; they must meet eligibility criteria and have an obvious impairment that has impact on the sport of football.

Teams must field at least one class C5 or C6 player at all times. No more than one player of class C8 are permitted to play at the same time. New IFCPF classification rules for CP football were implemented from January 2018, which included sport classes and classification methods. The sport classes were reclassified as FT1 for significant activity limitations, FT2 for moderate limitations and FT3 for minimal limitations.

== Spreading ==
The following nations have a football national team:

Africa

Ghana, Nigeria, South Africa, Tunisia

America

Argentina, Brazil, Chile, Canada, Colombia, Mexico, USA, Venezuela

Asia

Australia, China, India, Iran, Japan, Jordan, Korea, Macao, Indonesia, Malaysia, Myanmar, Singapore, Thailand, United Arab Emirates

Europe

Belgium, Denmark, Germany, England, Finland, France, Ireland, Italy, Netherlands, Norway, Northern Ireland, Portugal, Austria, Russia, Scotland, Spain, Turkey, Ukraine, Wales

== Major world competitions ==
The sport has several major competitions. These include the IFCPF CP Football World Championships, former the CPISRA Football-7-a-Side World Championships. The first CPISRA World Championships took place in Denmark in 1982, four years after the first international competition for the sport took place in Scotland at the Cerebral Palsy International Games.

7-a-side football was also played at the Paralympic Games, making its debut at the 1984 Summer Paralympics. It was dropped from the Paralympic program for the 2020 Summer Paralympics.

List of major world competitions

- IFCPF World Cup
- Football 7-a-side at the Summer Paralympics
- Football at the Cerebral Palsy Games

== Continental championships ==
List of continental championships

- IFCPF European Championships
- IFCPF Americas Championships
- IFCPF Asia-Oceania Championships
- Football 7-a-side at the ASEAN Para Games

== See also ==
- International Federation of Cerebral Palsy Football
- Cerebral Palsy Games
- IWAS World Games
- Blind football
- Amputee football
