= Mexico national cerebral palsy football team =

- Federation: Federacion Mexicana de Deportes para Personas con Paralisis Cerebral (FEMEDEPC)
- IFCPF ranking: 21
- Highest IFCPF ranking: 19 (July 2011, September 2012)
- Lowest IFCPF ranking: 22 (November 2014)

Mexico national cerebral palsy football team is the national cerebral football team for Mexico that represents the team in international competitions. The country has never participated at the Paralympics.

== Background ==
Federacion Mexicana de Deportes para Personas con Paralisis Cerebral (FEMEDEPC) manages the national team. In 2016, the national team was inactive as the country. The sport was being developed with the goal in mind of establishing a national team. The sport was developed enough to host a national championships.

National team development is supported by an International Federation of Cerebral Palsy Football (IFCPF) recognized national championship. Recognized years for the national IFCPF recognized competition include 2010, 2011, 2012, 2013, 2014, and 2015. In 2015, the championsion was in its seventh year. That year, six teams participated including Jalisco, Tamaulipas, Veracruz, Estado de México, Michoacán, and Distrito Federal.

== Players ==
There have been a number of players for the Mexican squad.

Name	Number	Classification	Position	Years active	Ref
Edgar Aguirre Roman		FT7		2016	
Bardo Isaac Alanis Rodríguez		FT7		2016	
Oscar Ivan Baca Norzagaray		FT7		2016	
Julio Baltazar Hernández		FT7		2016	
Rogelio Constantino Gallegos		FT7		2016	
Arturo Crespo Baltazar		FT8		2016	
Marcos Cruz Jimenez		FT5		2016	
Salvador Cuevas Magaña		FT7		2016	
Jonathan Uriel Dávila Pérez		FT7		2016	
Sebastian De La Rosa Vicente		FT6		2016	
Orlando Díaz Gómez		FT7		2016	
Gonzalo Ramsés García Yerena		FT7		2016	
Jesus Arnulfo Gonzalez Lara		FT7		2016	
José Ramón González Gutiérrez		FT7		2016	
Enrique González Orozco		FT7		2016	
José Angel Guerrero Martínez		FT5		2016	
Jesus Hernandez Cosio		FT7		2016	
Joel Ernesto Legarreta Gomez		FT6		2016	
Luis Alberto Lopez Franco		FT8		2016	
Juan Carlos Marín González		FT5		2016	
Hector Alejandro Martinez Sandria		FT5		2016	
Juan Daniel Montejano Alemán		FT7		2016	
Hugo Eduardo Morquecho Castro		FT7		2016	
Julian Ramirez Martinez		FT5		2016	
Salvador Manuel Rocha Aguilar		FT7		2016	
Juan Carlos Rojas Nava		FT7		2016	
Francisco Javier Ruiz Ramirez		FT7		2016	
Carlos Fernando Saldaña Arteaga		FT7		2016	
Carlos Israel Samaniego Barrera		FT7		2016	
Jorge Sanchez Reyes		FT7		2016	
Abdel Jonathan Vega Garc		FT7		2016	
Pedro Villanueva		FT5		2016	

== Ranking ==
Mexico was ranked twenty-first in the world by the IFCPF in 2016. The team is also ranked sixth in the Americas that same year. In November 2014, the team was ranked twenty-second. In August 2013, Mexico was ranked twenty-first. In July 2011 and September 2012, Mexico was ranked nineteenth.

== Results ==
The country has never participated in a Paralympic Games since the sport made its debut at the 1984 Games. Mexico has participated in a number of international tournaments. At the Football 7-a-side International Tournament in Portugal in 2011, Mexico lost to Canada 2 - 3. Six teams participated in the Toronto hosted American Cup in 2014. Group A included Venezuela, Argentina and Canada. Group B included Mexico, Brazil and the United States. The tournament was important for preparations for the 2015 Parapan American Games, and because it was the last major continental level competition of the year.

Competition	Location	Year	Total Teams	Result	Ref
America Cup	Toronto, Canada	2014	6	6	
Parapan American Youth Games	Buenos Aires, Argentina	2013	6		
British Paralympic World Cup	Nottingham, England	2012	12		
Football 7-a-side International Tournament	Porto, Portugal	2011	4		
