= United States men's national cerebral palsy soccer team =

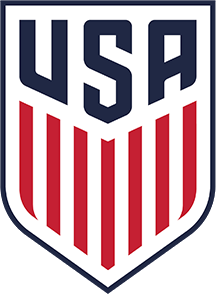
- Shirt badge/Association crest
- Federation: US Soccer Federation
- IFCPF ranking: 4
- Highest IFCPF ranking: 4 (October 2017)
- Lowest IFCPF ranking: 9 (September 2012, August 2013, November 2014)

Parapan American Games
- Appearances: 1

The United States men's national CP soccer team, formerly known as the United States Para 7-a-side national team, represents the United States in men's CP football international competitions. It is operated by the United States Soccer Federation. The team finished seventh at the 2015 IPCPF World Championships. They have competed at several Paralympic Games, including the 1984, 1992, 1996, 2004 and 2012 editions. One of their best finishes was in 1996 when they finished fourth. Their head coach is Stuart Sharp. Comedian Josh Blue is one of their former players.

The U.S. Para 7-a-side National Soccer Team (USPNT) is an elite level program that selects players from across the United States in preparation for International standard competition. The National Team, in addition to friendly matches and invitational tournaments, competes in the following events: Intercontinental Cup, Copa America, World Championships, Parapan American Games, Paralympic Games.

For players to be eligible, they must be ambulant (no requirement for assistive walking aids) and have one of the following neurological conditions, have had a Stroke, have Cerebral Palsy, have had a Traumatic Brain Injury / Acquired Brain Injury.

Individuals with the above conditions may display varying degrees of the following impairments: Diplegia, Hemiplegia, Triplegia, Quadriplegia, Monoplegia, Dystonia, Athetosis, Ataxia, Balance issues, Co-ordination issues, Weakness in certain areas of the body.

In many cases the above conditions may result in only minimal levels of motor dysfunction (some not noticeable to the untrained eye); however, under the rules of the sport, this could still make players eligible for the U.S. Paralympic National Team.

"Football 7-a-side" is the standard term for the game informally known as "C.P. Football," and international tournaments are hosted by the International Paralympic Committee, FIFA, or International Federation of CP Football IFCPF. Team selection and tournaments are competitive, and tend to be run like professional sport organizations. The USA team trains at the Olympic Training Center at Chula Vista, California, and the Home Depot Center at Carson, California.

== Background ==
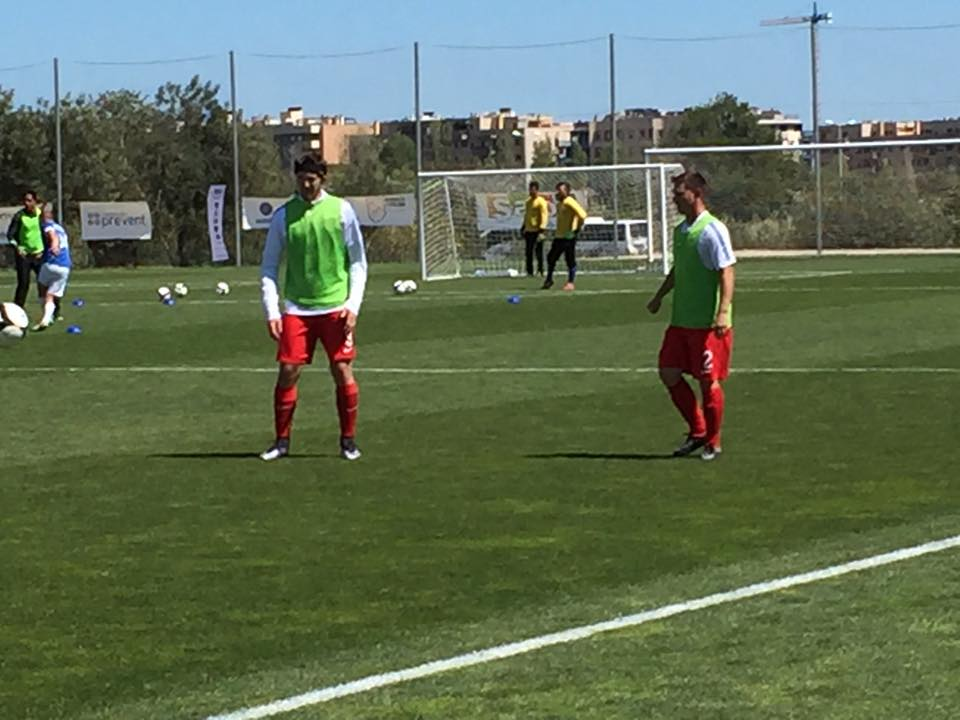
Team USA warming up at the 2016 Salou tournament.

The national team is managed by the US Soccer Federation. Current head coach Stuart Sharp has been in his role since 2014. In 2012, the team was coached by Jay Hoffman. While the United States was active in participating in the IFCPF World Championships and Paralympic Games by 2016, the country did not have a national championships to support national team player development.

== Ranking ==
The United States was ranked fourth in the world by the IFCPF in 2019. That same year, the team was also ranked third in the Americas. In September 2012, August 2013 and November 2014, the team was ranked ninth in the world. In July 2011, the team was ranked eighth.

== Players ==
There have been a number of players for the American squad.

Name	Number	Classification	Position	Years active	Ref
Mason Abbiate		FT7	Midfielder	2015-2016	
Christopher Ahrens	6	FT7	Defender	2011-2012	
Adam Ballou	7	FT7	Midfielder	2007, 2009-2012, 2014-2016	
Tyler Bennett	11	FT7	Midfielder	2010-2012	
Bryce Boarman	5	FT5	Defender	2010, 2012	
Dylan Brown	8	FT6	Forward	2012	
Nick Creasey	2	FT7		2010-2011	
Alex Hendricks	18	FT7	Goalkeeper	2011-2017	
KaeCe Hildreth	6	FT7		2010	
Charlie Howard	12	FT7		2010-2012	
Keith Johnson	1	FT7	Goalkeeper	2004-2012, 2016	
Chad Jones	4	FT5	Defender/Midfielder	2011-2012	
Tommy Latsch	8	FT7		2010-2011	
Josh McKinney	9	FT7	Midfielder/Forward	1995-2012	
Moises Morales	3, 15	FT7	Midfielder/Forward	2010, 2012	
Tyler Penn	18	FT5		2010	
Rene Renteria	16	FT8	Midfielder/Forward	2012	
Gavin Sibayan	2	FT7	Defender/Midfielder	2012-2016	
Jason Slemons	3	FT5	Defender/Midfielder	2003-2011	
Jerreme Wade	14	FT7	Midfielder	2012	
Marthell Vazquez	10	FT5	Goalkeeper/Forward	2010-2012	

== Results ==
The United States has participated in a number of international tournaments. Six teams participated in the Toronto hosted American Cup in 2014. Group A included Venezuela, Argentina and Canada. Group B included Mexico, Brazil and the United States. The tournament was important for preparations for the 2015 Parapan American Games, and because it was the last major continental level competition of the year.

Competition	Location	Year	Total Teams	Result	Ref
Pre-Paralympic Tournament	Salou, Spain	2016	7	6	
Footie 7 Tournament	Povao de Varzim, Portugal	2015	5	3	
America Cup	Toronto, Canada	2014	6	3	
9th Barcelona International Trophy of CP Football	Barcelona, Spain	2014	4	2	
Intercontinental Cup	Barcelona, Spain	2013	16		
Ireland CP International Tournament	Ireland	2013	4		
British Paralympic World Cup	Nottingham, England	2012	12		
2012 Paralympic World Cup	London, England	2012	4		
Yevpretoria Ukraine	Yevpatoria, Crimea, Ukraine	2012	8		
Nottingham British Paralympic World Cup	Nottingham, England	2010	4	4	
CPISRA International Championships	Arnhem, Netherlands	2009	11		

The United States has also played in a number of friendlies. In December 2011, Canada and the United States played a series of three friendly matches in Chula Vista, California. Canada won the opener 4 - 2. They then repeated this score in the second match. The United States won the third game 2 - 3.

=== IFCPF World Championships ===
The United States has participated in the IFCPF World Championships.

World Championships	Location	Total Teams	Result	Ref
2015 IFCPF World Championships	England	15	7	
2011 CPSIRA World Championships	Netherlands	16	8	

=== Paralympic Games ===
The United States has participated in 7-a-side football at the Paralympic Games.

Paralympic Results

Games	Results	Ref
2012 Summer Paralympics	7	
2004 Summer Paralympics	8	
1996 Summer Paralympics	4	
1992 Summer Paralympics		
1984 Summer Paralympics		
