= Argentina national cerebral palsy football team =

- Shirt badge/Association crest
- Nickname(s): Tigres
- Federation: Argentine Cerebral Palsy Football Federation
- IFCPF ranking: 6
- Highest IFCPF ranking: 6 (August 2013, November 2014, 2016)
- Lowest IFCPF ranking: 9 (September 2011)
Home colours	Away colours

World Championship
- Appearances: 2 (First in 2011)
- Best result: 7

Parapan American Games
- Appearances: 1

The Argentina national cerebral palsy football team (nicknamed Los Tigres) is the national football team that represents Argentina in international competitions. The team is managed by the "Argentine Cerebral Palsy Football Federation" Spanish: Federación Argentina de Fútbol de Parálisis Cerebral (FAFPC). Their best world ranking sixth and their lowest was ninth. Argentina has competed at both the IFCPF World Championships and the Paralympic Games, but has never finished in the medals in either event.

== Overview ==
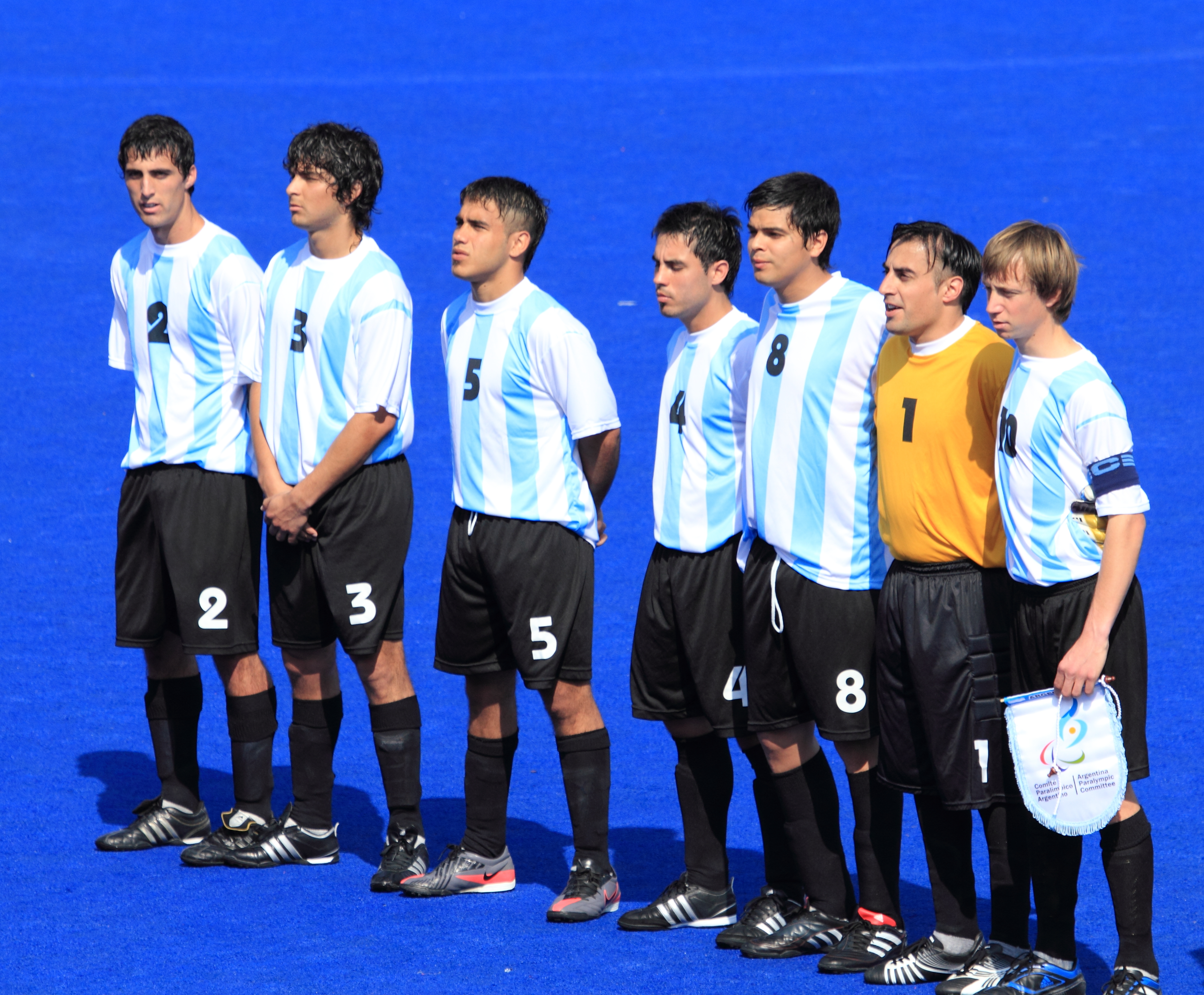
The team in 2012

In 2012, the team was coached by Osvaldo Hernández. In February 2014, an IFCPF coaching workshop was held in Brazil to try to further develop the sport. Chilean, Brazilian and Argentine coaches participated in it.

National team development is supported by an International Federation of Cerebral Palsy Football (IFCPF) recognized national championship. Recognized years for the national IFCPF recognized competition include 2010, 2011, 2012, 2013, 2014, and 2015.

In 2016, after getting an endorsement by the World AntiDoping Agency (WADA), the IFCPF Anti-Doping Code was formally amended to allow for out of competition testing. This was done through a WADA approved Whereabouts Programme managed through ADAMS. Drawing from players in a Registered Testing Pool, players from this country were included ahead of the 2016 Summer Paralympics in Rio.

== Ranking ==
Argentina was ranked sixth in the world by the IFCPF in 2016. The team is also ranked second in the Americas in 2016. In August 2013 and November 2014, Argentina was also ranked sixth in the world. In September 2012, the team was ranked eighth. In September 2011, Argentina was ranked ninth.

== Players ==
There have been a number of players for the Argentine squad.

Name	Number	Classification	Years active	Ref
Alberto Alabarce			2013	
Fabricio Álvarez			2013	
Fabio Miguel Coria	9	FT8	2012	
Maximiliano Fernández	6	FT7	2012	
Matías Fernández Romano	11	FT6	2012	
Carlos Ferreira	15	FT7	2012	
Claudio Figuera	14	FT7	2012	
Ezequiel Jaime	4	FT7	2012	
Rodrigo Luque			2013	
Rodrigo Lugrin	10	FT7	2012	
Rodrigo Luquez	3	FT8	2012	
Antonio Medina	7	FT5	2012	
Mariano Moranas	2	FT8	2012	
Sergio Gutiérrez	12	FT7	2012	
Gustavo Nahuelquin	1	FT5	2012	
Gaston Rodríguez	8	FT7	2012	
Brian David Vivot	5	FT7	2012	

== Results ==
Argentina has participated in a number of international tournaments. Six teams participated in the Toronto hosted American Cup in 2014. Group A included Venezuela, Argentina and Canada. Group B included Mexico, Brazil and the United States. The tournament was important for preparations for the 2015 Parapan American Games, and because it was the last major continental level competition of the year. The team participated in the 2015 Parapan American Games, where they came away with a silver medal.

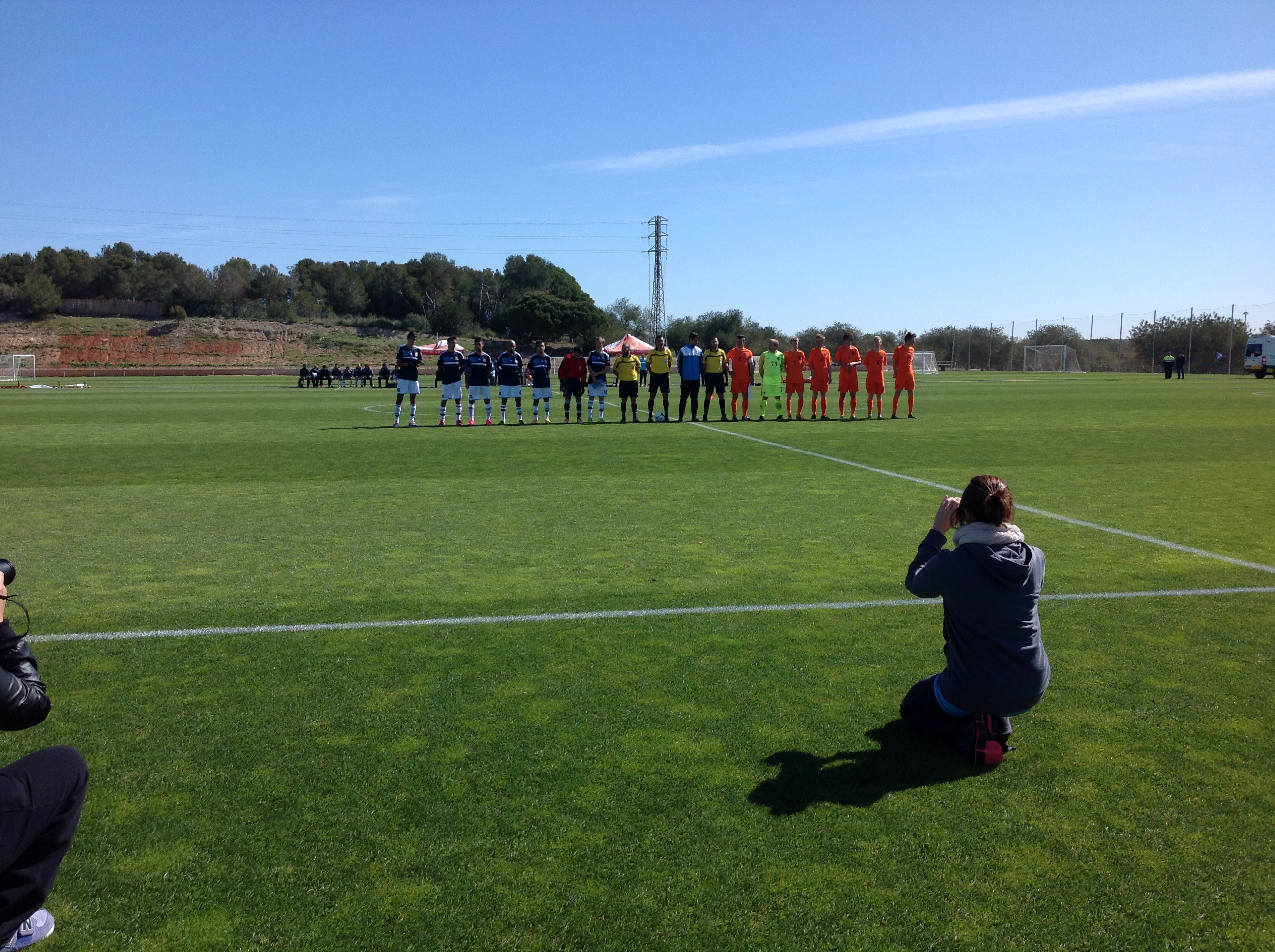
Argentina and the Netherlands warm up ahead of a match at the 2016 Salou tournament

Competition	Location	Year	Total Teams	Result	Ref
Pre-Paralympic Tournament	Salou, Spain	2016	7	7	
Footie 7 Tournament	Povao de Varzim, Portugal	2015	5	2	
Parapan American Games	Toronto, Canada	2015		2	
America Cup	Toronto, Canada	2014	6	2	
Parapan American Youth Games	Buenos Aires, Argentina	2013	6		
Intercontinental Cup	Barcelona, Spain	2013	16		
Défi Sportif Tournament	Canada	2013	4	1	
British Paralympic World Cup	Nottingham, England	2012	12		
Yevpretoria Ukraine	Yevpatoria, Crimea, Ukraine	2012	8		

=== IFCPF World Championships ===
Argentina has participated in the IFCPF World Championships.

World Championships	Location	Total Teams	Result	Ref
2015 IFCPF World Championships	England	15	8	
2011 CPSIRA World Championships	Netherlands	16	7	

=== Paralympic Games ===
Argentina has participated in 7-a-side football at the Paralympic Games. They have never won a medal.

Paralympic Results

Games	Results	Ref
2012 Summer Paralympics	6	
2004 Summer Paralympics	4	
2000 Summer Paralympics	5	
1996 Summer Paralympics		

2016 Summer Paralympics

Argentina qualified for the Paralympics through the 2015 Parapan American Games in Toronto after Iran's qualifying spot was withdrawn because of a lack of competitors in their region.

The draw for the tournament was held on May 6 at the 2016 Pre Paralympic Tournament in Salou, Spain. Argentina was put into Group B with the United States, Netherlands and Russia. Iran qualified for the 2016 Rio Games following the suspension of Russia. The IPC ruled that there could not be a redraw for the groups. This resulted in Iran being put into Group A with the Netherlands, Argentina and the United States. The tournament where the Paralympic draw took place featured 7 of the 8 teams participating in Rio. It was the last major preparation event ahead of the Rio Games for all teams participating. Argentina finished 7th after losing placement matches to the United States 4 - 3 and Ireland 0 - 3.

Going into the Rio Games, the team was hoping to build on good results earlier in past two years and win a medal.

Pos	Team	Pld	W	D	L	GF	GA	GD	Pts	Qualification
1	Ukraine	3	3	0	0	10	2	+8	9	Semi finals
2	Brazil (H)	3	2	0	1	10	4	+6	6	Semi finals
3	Great Britain	3	1	0	2	7	5	+2	3	5th–6th place match
4	Ireland	3	0	0	3	2	18	−16	0	7th–8th place match

Source: Paralympic.org
(H) Hosts
