= CP8 (classification) =

Cerebral palsy sports classification

CP8 is a disability sport classification specific to cerebral palsy. In many sports, it is grouped inside other classifications to allow people with cerebral palsy to compete against people with other different disabilities but deemed to have an equivalent level of functionality.

CP8 classified competitors are the group who are least physically affected by their cerebral palsy, with their disability generally manifested as spasticity in at least one limb. There are a number of sports for which they are eligible to participate in, including alpine skiing, athletics, cycling, football, Nordic skiing, standing volleyball and swimming. In some of these sports, different classification systems or names for CP8 are used.

== Definition and participation ==
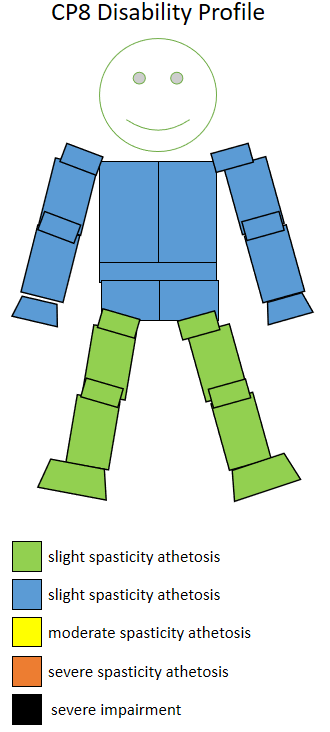
The spasticity athetosis level and location of a CP8 sportsperson.

CP8 classified competitors are the group who are least physically affected by their cerebral palsy. CP8 class sports people tend to participate in football, cycling, swimming and athletics.

Cerebral Palsy-International Sports and Recreation Association defined this class in January 2005 as, "Minimal involvement 27 This class is for the minimally affected diplegic Spasticity Grade 1; hemiplegic Spasticity Grade 1: monoplegic; minimal athetoid/ataxic athlete. According to point 1.2 the athlete must have an obvious impairment of function evident during classification. This athlete may appear to have near normal function when running but the athlete must demonstrate a limitation in function to classifiers based on evidence of spasticity (increased tone), ataxic, athetoid or dystonic movements while performing on the field of play or in training."

== Performance ==
T38 competitor Evan O'Hanlon

CP8 competitors must have cerebral palsy to such an extent that it impacts their sporting performance against able-bodied competitors to be eligible for this class. This is general manifested as spasticity in at least one limb. They are able to freely engage in a number of sport related motions including jumping. They also tend to have good balance and have minimal issues with coordination. People in this class tend to have energy expenditure similar to people without cerebral palsy.

== Sports ==
=== Athletics ===
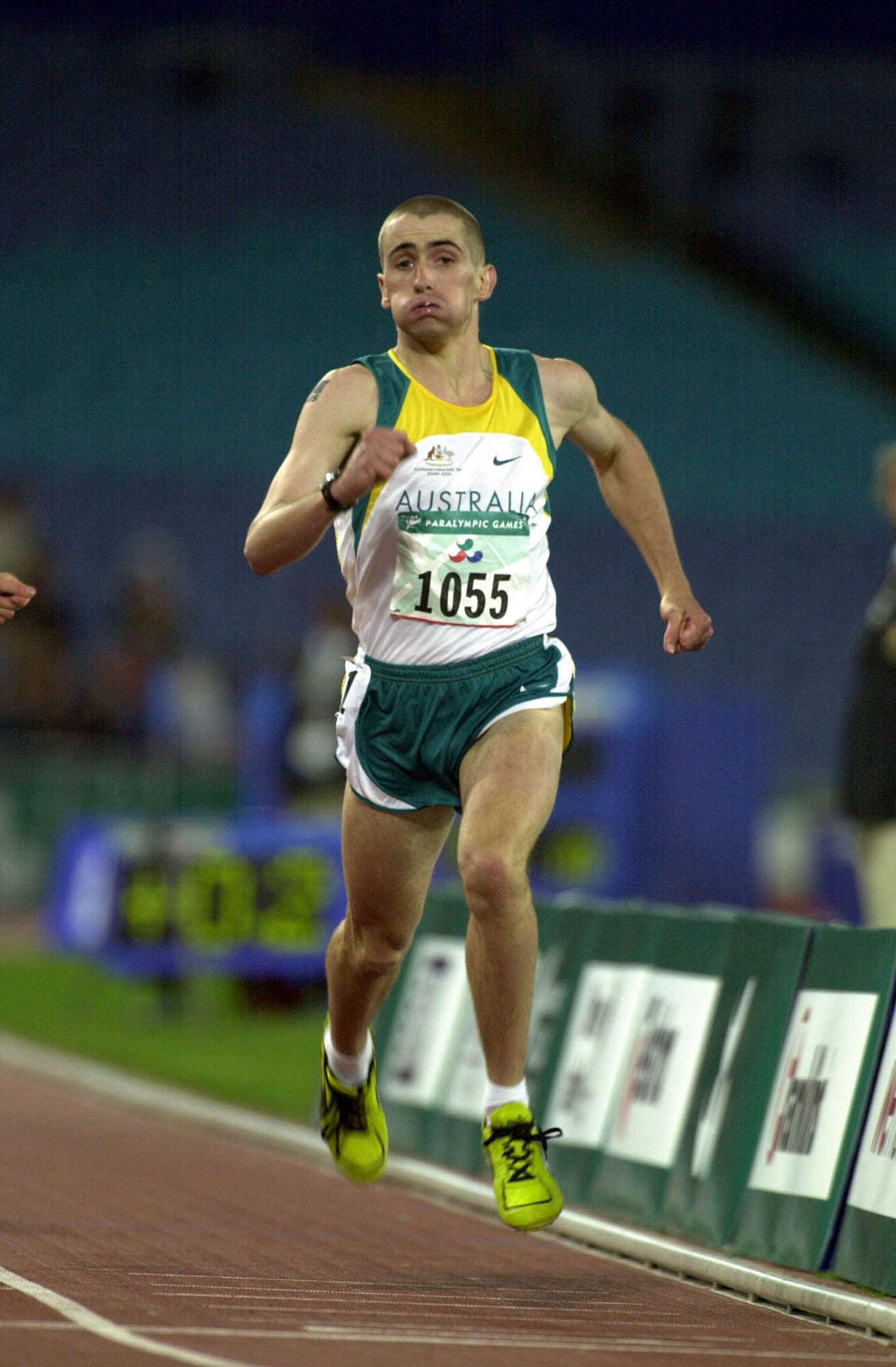
CP8 / T38 track and field athlete Tim Sullivan.

People with cerebral palsy are eligible to compete in athletics. The CP-ISRA classes of CP3, CP4, CP5, CP6, CP7 and CP8 have counterparts with the classification system used by the International Paralympic Committee and are eligible to compete at the Paralympic Games. In athletic events, CP8 competitors participate T38/F38 classes.

In athletics, the form used in racing appears similar to able-bodied competitors, but should have some sort of visible limp. The class participates in jumping events. Notable competitors in this class include T38 Australian sprinter Tim Sullivan. At the home hosted 2000 Summer Paralympics, he won three gold medals.

=== Cycling ===
People with cerebral palsy are eligible to compete in cycling. The CP-ISRA classes of CP3, CP4, CP5, CP6, CP7 and CP8 have counterparts with the classification system used by the International Cycling Union and are eligible to compete at the Paralympic Games. In UCI sanctioned events, CP7 and CP8 may compete on a bicycle in the C4 class.

=== Football ===
CP8 sportspeople are eligible to compete in association football in the sport of CP football. CP8 players are classified as FT8. The rules for the sport specify that there can be no more than one FT8 footballer on the field at a time. Post-2018, FT8 footballers are designated internationally as FT3 by the IFCPF.

Compared to able-bodied soccer layers, CP8 players have difficulty generating force when kicking the ball. Because they have an impulse impairment, they have slower responses times in the box compared to able-bodied competitors. Their level of disability is such that most can be mainstreamed and compete against able-bodied players.

CP footballers are first required to go through national level classification before being eligible for international classification. The first stage of international classification involves a physical assessment. This may involve classifiers who are medical experts. The second stage involves observing the footballer practising their sport specific skills in a non-competitive setting. The third stage involves classifiers observing the player in competition for at least 30 minutes. Following that, the classification panel then assigns the footballer to a class, which may also include "Not Eligible."

=== Skiing ===
People with cerebral palsy are eligible to compete in skiing. The CP-ISRA classes of CP3, CP4, CP5, CP6, CP7 and CP8 have counterparts with the classification system used by the International Paralympic Committee and are eligible to compete at the Paralympic Games. CP8 Nordic skiers compete in LW4, LW6/8 and LW9. CP8 alpine skiers compete in LW6/8 or LW9/2 .

In teaching skiers with cerebral palsy, instructors are encouraged to delay the introduction ski poles as skiers may overgrip them. Use of a ski bra is also encouraged as it helps the skier learn correct knee and hip placement. One method of learning to ski for competitors with cerebral palsy in this classification is the American Teaching System. They first thing skiers learn is what their equipment is, and how to put it on and take it off. Next, skiers learn about positioning their body in a standing position on flat terrain. After this, the skier learns how to side step, and then how to fall down and get back up again. The skier then learns how to do a straight run, and then is taught how to get on and off the chair lift. This is followed by learning wedge turns and weight transfers, wedge turns, wide track parallel turns, how to use ski poles, and advanced parallel turns.

While learning to ski, skiers in this class with cerebral palsy may use ski-bras, bungee cords, outriggers, slant boards or toe boards.

CP8 LW4 skiers may have better balance while using skis than they would otherwise. This presents challenges for coaches who are working with the skier. Compared to other skiers in the class, the skier with cerebral palsy may tire more quickly.

=== Standing volleyball ===
Standing volleyball is a disability sport variant open to people with different types of permanent minimal disabilities, with two different grades of teams depending on the severity of their disability. CP7 and CP8 sportspeople are eligible to participate in Grade A. This grade includes people who have finger amputations.

=== Swimming ===
People with cerebral palsy are eligible to compete in swimming. The CP-ISRA classes of CP1 to CP8 have counterparts with the classification system used by the International Paralympic Committee and are eligible to compete at the Paralympic Games. CP8 swimmers are often classified in S8, S9 or S10 because of their hemiplegia and spasticity. The less severe, the closer they are to S10.

Because of the neuromuscular nature of their disability, they have slower start times than other people in their classes. They are also more likely to interlock their hands when underwater in some strokes to prevent hand drift, which increases drag while swimming. For S8 classified swimmers with CP, they are able to record long distances underwater. The longest distances Paralympic S8 swimmers can measure are often half that of comparable Olympic counters. This is attributed to neuromuscular related drag issues. CP swimmers are more efficient at above water swimming than underwater swimming. CP8 swimmers tend to have a passive normalized drag in the range of 0.4 to 0.9. This puts them into the passive drag band of PDB6, PDB8, and PDB10. CP8 swimmers experience swimmers shoulder, a swimming related injury, at rates similar to their able-bodied counterparts. When fatigued, asymmetry in their stroke becomes a problem for swimmers in this class. The integrated classification system used for swimming, where swimmers with CP compete against those with other disabilities, is subject to criticisms has been that the nature of CP is that greater exertion leads to decreased dexterity and fine motor movements. This puts competitors with CP at a disadvantage when competing against people with amputations who do not lose coordination as a result of exertion.

=== Other sports ===
People with cerebral palsy are eligible to compete in archery. The CP-ISRA classes of CP3, CP4, CP5, CP6, CP7 and CP8 have counterparts with the classification system used by the World Archery Federation and are eligible to compete at the Paralympic Games. They can also compete in wheelchair fencing. The CP-ISRA classes of CP3, CP4, CP55, CP6, CP7 and CP8 have counterparts with the classification system used by the International Wheelchair and Amputee Sports Federation and are eligible to compete at the Paralympic Games. Another sport CP8 athletes can be classified into is wheelchair basketball. he CP-ISRA classes of CP4, CP5, CP6, CP7 and CP8 have counterparts with the classification system used by the International Wheelchair Basketball Federation and are eligible to compete at the Paralympic Games. Para-Taekwondo is another sport open to CP5, CP6, CP7 and CP8 class competitors. Early on, the CP8 classification competed as CP8 before a different sport specific classification system was developed. Another sporting option for people in this class is table tennis. Para-equestrian, powerlifting, rowing, sailing and shooting are sports which people in this class can participate in at the elite level. In rowing, they tend be classified LTA-PD.
