= CP6 (classification) =

Cerebral palsy sports classification

CP6 is a disability sport classification specific to cerebral palsy. In many sports, it is grouped inside other classifications to allow people with cerebral palsy to compete against people with other different disabilities but the same level of functionality. Sportspeople in this class are ambulatory, and able to walk without the use of an assistive device. Their bodies are constantly in motion. The running form of people in this class is often better than their form while walking.

Some of the sports that CP6 sportspeople are eligible to participate in at the elite level include athletics, cycling, football, skiing, swimming, race running, para-taekwondo, wheelchair tennis, archery, para-equestrian, powerlifting, rowing, sailing, shooting, sledge hockey, table tennis, wheelchair basketball, wheelchair fencing, and table tennis In some of these sports, different classification systems or names for CP6 are used.

== Definition and participation ==
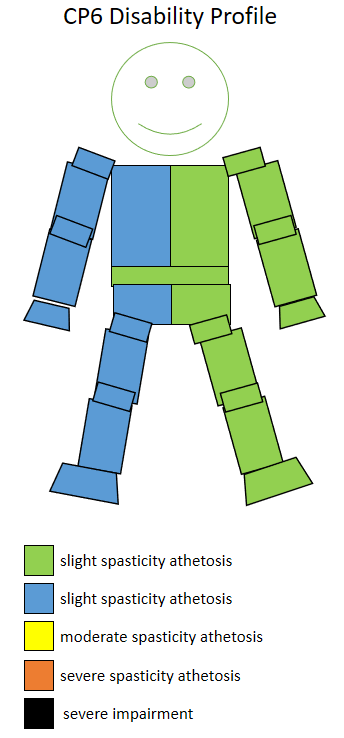
The spasticity athetosis level and location of a CP6 sportsperson.

Cerebral Palsy-International Sports and Recreation Association defined this class in January 2005 as, "Athetoid or Ataxic - Moderate involvement The athlete ambulates without assistive devices. Athetosis is the most prevalent factor, although some ambulant spastic quadriplegics (i.e. more arm involvement than in ambulant diplegics), may fit this Class. Athetosis means unsteady (writhing), not having the capability to remain still. All four limbs will usually show functional involvement in sports movements. Class 6 athletes have more control problems in upper limbs than Class 5 athletes, although the former usually have better function in lower limbs particularly when running. Lower Extremities-Function can vary considerably depending on the sports skill involved, from poor, laboured, slow walking to a running gait, which often shows better mechanics. There can be a marked contrast between the walking athetoid with inco-ordinated gait and the smooth even paced co-ordinated running/cycling action. Cyclical movements however are much better performed like cycling, running and free-style swimming Balance-May have good dynamic balance compared with static balance. Spasticity is common in Class 6 athletes and should not be a reason for placement in Class 5. Upper Extremities and Hand Control-Grasp and release can be significantly affected when throwing in the moderate to severe athetoid athlete. The more spasticity present the greater the limits on follow through and maintenance of balance after throwing. "

== Performance ==
CP6 sportspeople are able to walk without the need for an assistive device. They lack coordination in all their limbs, with the greater lack of coordination involving their upper body. Their bodies are often in motion, and they cannot maintain a still state. While CP2, CP3 and CP6 have similar issues with Athetoid or Ataxic, CP6 competitors have "flight" while they are ambulant in that it is possible for both feet to not be touching the ground while walking. CP2 and CP3 are unable to do this.

== Sports ==
=== Athletics ===
In athletics events, CP6 competitors participate in T36/F36 classes. In athletics, CP6 competitors have some balance issues in track events and field events that require either running or throwing. Their form in running is often better than their form while walking.

=== Cycling ===
People with cerebral palsy are eligible to compete in cycling at the Paralympic Games. CP5 and CP6 competitors may compete using tricycles in the T2 class. Cyclists opting to compete in the T2 class often do so as a result of balance issues, which make riding a standard bicycle or handcycle difficult. Tricyclists are not eligible to compete in track events, only in road events. CP5 and CP6 may also choose to compete on a bicycle in the C3 class.

=== Football ===
CP6 sportspeople are eligible to compete in association football in the sport of CP football. CP6 players are classified as FT6. The rules of the sport are such that there must be at least on FT5 or FT6 player on the field at all times. If it is not possible to field an FT5 or FT6 player, the team plays with six players on the field instead of seven.

The extent of their disability is such that CP5 players would unlikely to ever be competitive against able-bodied players. When they do not have the ball, CP6 class players may have problems stopping and changing directions when running. When kicking from a non-stationary position, their accuracy is severely reduced. They may have difficulty when dribbling the ball.

CP footballers are first required to go through national level classification before being eligible for international classification. The first stage of international classification involves a physical assessment. This may involve classifiers who are medical experts. The second stage involves observing the footballer practising their sport specific skills in a non-competitive setting. The third stage involves classifiers observing the player in competition for at least 30 minutes. Following that, the classification panel then assigns the footballer to a class, which may also include "Not Eligible."

=== Skiing ===
CP6 are able to compete at the elite Paralympic level. CP6 Nordic skiers compete in LW3 and LW9, while CP6 alpine skiers compete in LW 1 and LW3/2.

In teaching skiers with cerebral palsy, instructors are encouraged to delay the introduction ski poles as skiers may overgrip them. Use of a ski bra is also encouraged as it helps the skier learn correct knee and hip placement. One method of learning to ski for competitors with cerebral palsy in this classification is the American Teaching System. They first thing skiers learn is what their equipment is, and how to put it on and take it off. Next, skiers learn about positioning their body in a standing position on flat terrain. After this, the skier learns how to side step, and then how to fall down and get back up again. The skier then learns how to do a straight run, and then is taught how to get on and off the chair lift. This is followed by learning wedge turns and weight transfers, wedge turns, wide track parallel turns, how to use ski poles, and advanced parallel turns.

While learning to ski, skiers in this class with cerebral palsy may use ski-bras, bungee cords, outriggers, slant boards or toe boards.

=== Swimming ===
CP6 swimmers are able to compete at the Paralympic Games. They are often classified as S7.

CP6 swimmers tend to have a passive normalized drag in the range of 0.5 to 0.8. This puts them into the passive drag band of PDB6, PDB7, PDB8, PDB9, and PDB10. Because of their balance issues, swimmers in this class can find the starting block problematic and often have slower times entering the water than other competitors in their class. CP6 swimmers experience swimmers shoulder, a swimming related injury, at rates similar to their able-bodied counterparts. When fatigued, asymmetry in their stroke becomes a problem for swimmers in this class. The integrated classification system used for swimming, where swimmers with CP compete against those with other disabilities, is subject to criticisms has been that the nature of CP is that greater exertion leads to decreased dexterity and fine motor movements. This puts competitors with CP at a disadvantage when competing against people with amputations who do not lose coordination as a result of exertion.

=== Other sports ===
People with cerebral palsy in this class are eligible to compete at the elite level in a number of other sports including wheelchair tennis, archery, para-equestrian, powerlifting, rowing, sailing, shooting, sledge hockey, table tennis, wheelchair basketball, wheelchair fencing, and table tennis. Race running is another sport open to this class. CP6 race runners may be classified as RR3 or RR4. Para-Taekwondo is another sport open to CP6 competitors. Early on, the CP6 classification competed as CP6 before a different sport specific classification system was developed.
