= Brazil national cerebral palsy football team =

- Federation: Associação Nacional de Desporto para Deficientes
- IFCPF ranking: 3
- Highest IFCPF ranking: 3 (2016, November 2014, August 2013)
- Lowest IFCPF ranking: 4 (September 2012, September 2011)

World Championship
- Appearances: 4 (First in 1998)
- Best result: 2

Parapan American Games
- Appearances: 2

Brazil national cerebral palsy football team is the national cerebral football team for Brazil that represents the team in international competitions. The team has been active internationally, and was ranked third in the world in 2016. At the 2015 IFCPF World Championships, they came away with a bronze. This was an improvement on 2011 when they finished fourth. Their best ever finish was second at the 2003 World Championships. Appearing at multiple Paralympic Games, Brazil won silver in 2004 and bronze in 2008.

== Background ==
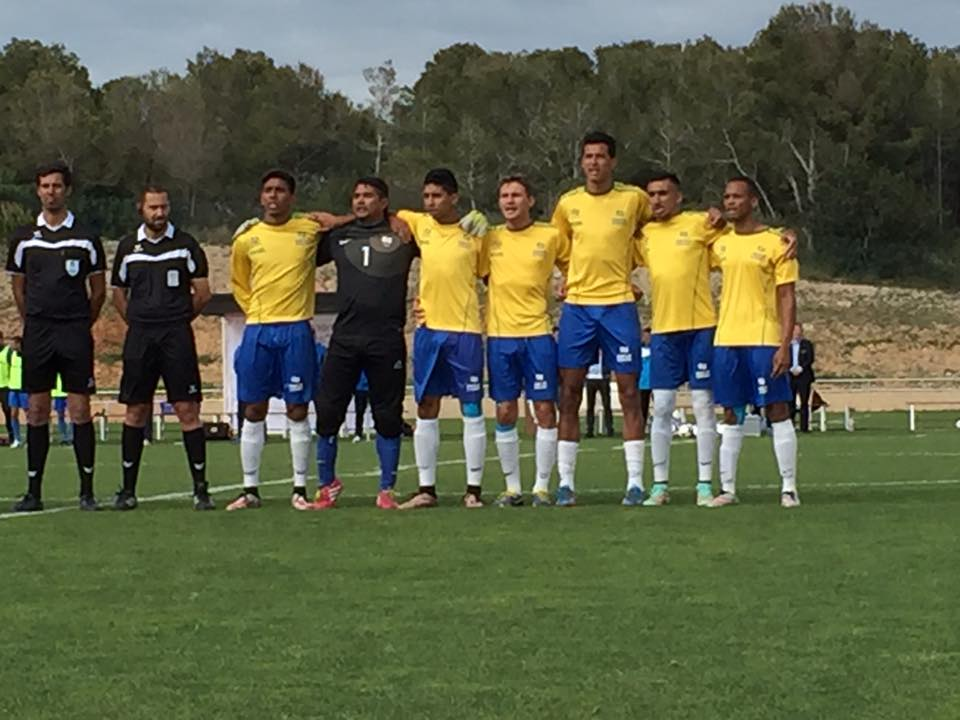
Brazil lined up for the start of a match at the 2016 Salou tournament.

Associação Nacional de Desporto para Deficientes oversees the national team in Brazil. During the 2000s, the team was one of the top four most dominant teams in the world alongside Russia, Ukraine and Iran. In 2012, the team was coached by Paulo Cruz. In February 2014, a coaching workshop was held in the country to try to further develop the sport. Brazilian and Argentine coaches participated in it.

National team development is supported by an International Federation of Cerebral Palsy Football (IFCPF) recognized national championship. Recognized years for the national IFCPF recognized competition include 2010, 2011, 2012, 2013, 2014, and 2015.

In 2016, after getting an endorsement by the World AntiDoping Agency (WADA), the IFCPF Anti-Doping Code was formally amended to allow for out of competition testing. This was done through a WADA approved Whereabouts Programme managed through ADAMS. Drawing from players in a Registered Testing Pool, players from this country were included ahead of the 2016 Summer Paralympics in Rio.

== Ranking ==
In 2016, Brazil was ranked third in the world by the IFCPF. The team is also ranked first in the Americas. In November 2014 and August 2013, they were ranked third. In September 2012 and September 2011, Brazil was ranked fourth.

== Players ==
There have been a number of players for the Brazilian squad.

Name	Number	Classification	Position	Years active	Ref
Fábio da Silva Bordignon	7	FT7	Striker	2011-2012	
Jan Francisco Brito da Costa	11	FT7	Midfielder	2011-2012, 2014	
Marcos Costa	11	FT8		2012	
Renato da Rocha Lima	9	FT7		2011	
Rael de Medeiros Coelho	8	FT8		2011	
Ronaldo de Souza Almeida	2	FT7	Defender	2012, 2014	
Marcos dos Santos Ferreira	1	FT7	Goalkeeper	2011-2012	
José Carlos Monteiro Guimarᾶes	4, 5	FT6	Striker	2011-2012, 2014	
Emanoel Oliveira	5	FT7	Defender	2012	
Dihego Rezende Rodrigues	14	FT7		2011-2012	
Yurig Ribeiro	8	FT7	Midfielder	2012	
Luciano Rocha	9	FT8		2012	
Jean Adriano Rodrigues	16	FT7		2011	
Igor Romero			Fielder	2014	
José Augusto Siqueira	3	FT7		2011	
Jorge Silva	12	FT6	Goalkeeper	2012	
Luciano Silva	9	FT7	Midfielder	2012	
Wanderson Silva de Oliveira	10	FT8	Midfielder	2011-2012	
Moisés Tamiozzo da Silva	1	FT6		2011-2012	
Mateus Francisco Tostes Calvo	6	FT8	Midfielder	2011-2012	
Fernandes Viera	3	FT7	Defender	2012	

== Results ==
Brazil has participated in a number of international tournaments. Six teams participated in the Toronto hosted American Cup in 2014. Group A included Venezuela, Argentina and Canada. Group B included Mexico, Brazil and the United States. The tournament was important for preparations for the 2015 Parapan American Games, and because it was the last major continental level competition of the year. Brazil came in second at the 2016 Pre-Paralympic Tournament in Salou, Spain after losing to Ukraine 0 - 2 in the final.

Competition	Location	Year	Total Teams	Result	Ref
Pre-Paralympic Tournament	Salou, Spain	2016		2	
CPISRA World Games	Nottingham, England	2015	7	2	
America Cup	Toronto, Canada	2014	6	1	
CPISRA 7-a-side Football Friendly Tournament	Groesbeek, Netherlands	2014	3	1	
Parapan American Youth Games	Buenos Aires, Argentina	2013	6		
British Paralympic World Cup	Nottingham, England	2012	12		
2012 Paralympic World Cup	London, England	2012	4		
Yevpretoria Ukraine	Yevpatoria, Crimea, Ukraine	2012	8		
CPISRA International Championships	Arnhem, Netherlands	2009	11		

=== IFCPF World Championships ===
Brazil has participated in the IFCPF World Championships.

World Championships	Location	Total Teams	Result	Ref
2015 IFCPF World Championships	England	15	3	
2011 CPSIRA World Championships	Netherlands	16	4	
2003 CPISRA World Championships	Buenos Aires, Argentina		2	
1998 CPISRA World Championships	Rio de Janeiro, Brazil		3	

=== Paralympic Games ===
Brazil has participated in 7-a-side football at the Paralympic Games.

Paralympic Results

Games	Results	Ref
2012 Summer Paralympics	4	
2008 Summer Paralympics	4	
2004 Summer Paralympics	2	
2000 Summer Paralympics	3	
1996 Summer Paralympics		
1992 Summer Paralympics		
