= Venezuela national cerebral palsy football team =

- Federation: Federacion Venezolana de Deportes para Personas con Paralisis Cerebral (FEVEDE-PC)
- IFCPF ranking: 15
- Highest IFCPF ranking: 15 (2016)
- Lowest IFCPF ranking: 20 (July 2011, September 2012)

Venezuela national cerebral palsy football team is the national cerebral football team for Venezuela that represents the team in international competitions. At the 2015 IFCPF World Championships, the team finished thirteenth in a fifteen deep field.

== Background ==
Federacion Venezolana de Deportes para Personas con Paralisis Cerebral (FEVEDE-PC) manages the national team. By 2016, Venezuela had a national championships to support the national team and was active in participating in the IFCPF World Championships.

National team development is supported by an International Federation of Cerebral Palsy Football (IFCPF) recognized national championship. Recognized years for the national IFCPF recognized competition include 2010, 2011, 2012, 2013, 2014, and 2015.

== Players ==
There have been a number of players for the Venezuelan squad.

Name	Number	Classification	Position	Years active	Ref
Diego Baez		FT5		2016	
Marlon Alexander Bello		FT7		2016	
Marcos Tulio Cárdenas Nieto		FT7		2016	
Carlos Carrasquel Torres		FT5		2016	
Eduardo Diaz		FT7		2016	
Edgar González		FT7		2016	
Jose Lara		FT7		2016	
Gabriel Medina Diaz		FT7		2016	
Richard Mogollon Melendez		FT7		2016	
Angel Evelio Molina Camacho		FT6		2016	
Brayan Andres Moreno Luna		FT7		2016	
Frank René Pineda Terán		FT7		2016	
Jose Quintana		FT5		2016	
Jefferzon Rangel		FT7		2016	
Daniel Enrique Sánchez		FT7		2016	
José Sangrons		FT8		2016	
Pedro Daniel Suárez Rico		FT7		2016	
Saul Torres Villegas		FT7		2016	
Jessy Junior Yari Villegas		FT7		2016	
Yonfer Orlando Zamora Guerra		FT7		2016	
Asdrubal Eusebio De Jesus Olivares Mora		FT8		2016	
Peter Antony Alvarado Gonzales		FT7		2016	
Jose Alejandro Carapaica		FT6		2016	
Jose Leonardo Gimón Villena		FT7		2016	
Luis Alfredo Gutierrez Vera		FT7		2016	
Wuarion Jesus Mendoza		FT7		2016	
Wilman Jesús Ortega Acosta		FT7		2016	
Yohandri Raul Angulo		FT8		2016	
Carlos Antolinez		FT5		2016	
Maikel Dudamel		FT7		2016	
Anthony Peña		FT7		2016	
Alveiro Quiñones		FT7		2016	
Anderson Alberto Morantes Ramirez		FT8		2016	
Gabriel Antonio Bravo Olivi		FT7		2016	
Cristian Sneider Moreno Perez		FT7		2016	

== Ranking ==
Venezuela was ranked fifteenth in the world by the IFCPF in 2016. The team is also ranked fifth in the Americas in 2016. Venezuela was ranked seventeenth in August 2013 and November 2014. In July 2011 and September 2012, the team was ranked twentieth. In 2014, the team had a goal of trying to improve their ranking to be among the top 16 teams in the world. They hoped doing so would increase their visibility in the country.

== Results ==
Venezuela has never participated in a Paralympic Games since the sport made its debut at the 1984 Games. Venezuela has participated in a number of international tournaments. Six teams participated in the Toronto hosted American Cup in 2014. Group A included Venezuela, Argentina and Canada. Group B included Mexico, Brazil and the United States. The tournament was important for preparations for the 2015 Parapan American Games, and because it was the last major continental level competition of the year. The team was scheduled to participate in the 2016 IFCPF Qualification Tournament World Championships in Vejen, Denmark in early August. The tournament was part of the qualifying process for the 2017 IFCPF World Championships. Other teams scheduled to participate included Scotland, Canada, Portugal, Iran, Northern Ireland, Australia, Japan, Republic of South Korea, Germany, Denmark, and Spain.

Competition	Location	Year	Total Teams	Result	Ref
IFCPF World Championships Qualification Tournament	Vejen, Denmark	2016			
America Cup	Toronto, Canada	2014	6	5	
Parapan American Youth Games	Buenos Aires, Argentina	2013	6		
Intercontinental Cup	Barcelona, Spain	2013	16		

In October 2014, the team played a friendly against the country's women's national under-20 side.

=== IFCPF World Championships ===
Venezuela has participated in the IFCPF World Championships. The team qualified for the 2017 edition based on their performance at the 2016 qualifying event in Denmark.

World Championships	Location	Total Teams	Result	Ref
2015 IFCPF World Championships	England	15	13	
