= Cerebral Palsy International Sports and Recreation Association =

International sporting federation

- Formation: 1969
- Type: Sports federation
- Headquarters: England
- Official language: English
- President: Peter Drysdale

The Cerebral Palsy International Sports and Recreation Association (CPISRA) was an international sports and recreation association for cerebral palsy and related neurological conditions. A founding member of the paralympic movement, CPISRA organised recreational opportunities, developed adaptive sports and organised sport events for people with Cerebral Palsy and related neurological conditions. CPISRA was formed in 1969. It was made up of worldwide members and a community of volunteers including an advisory board, specialist committees and networks.

In November 2022, CPISRA merged with IWAS (International Wheelchair and Amputee Sports Federation) to form World Abilitysport. CPISRA and IWAS were both IOSD members of the International Paralympic Committee (IPC).

== History ==
The first CP World Games were held by the International CP Society (ICPS) in 1972. CPISRA became independent from the ICPS in 1978 and since then has held regular regional and world championships. In 2018, Sant Cugat del Vallès hosted the CPISRA World Games and welcomed 600 participants from 30 countries. This transpired to be the last CPISRA World Games, before the introduction of World Abilitysport Games in 2023.

== Sports ==
1. Athletics
2. Boccia
3. CP football
4. Swimming
5. Wheelchair slalom
6. Racerunning

== Historical members ==
1. Australia
2. Austria
3. Bahrain
4. Belgium
5. Brazil
6. Canada
7. Catalonia
8. China
9. Chinese Taipei
10. Colombia
11. Croatia
12. Czech Republic
13. Denmark
14. Egypt
15. England
16. Faroe Islands
17. Finland
18. France
19. Germany
20. Hong Kong
21. Hungary
22. India
23. Iran
24. Italy
25. Japan
26. South Korea
27. Kuwait
28. Lithuania
29. Malta
30. Mexico
31. Morocco
32. Netherlands
33. Poland
34. Portugal
35. Qatar
36. Russia
37. Scotland
38. Singapore
39. Slovakia
40. South Africa
41. Spain
42. Sweden
43. Switzerland
44. Thailand
45. Tunisia
46. United Arab Emirates
47. United States
48. Venezuela

== Events ==
Cerebral Palsy Games (CPISRA World Games / CP Games)

No.	Year	Games	Host city	Opening ceremony	Closing ceremony	Ref.
1	1974	1. International Cerebral Palsy Games	(England) London			
2	1976	2. International Cerebral Palsy Games	(France) Montrodat			
3	1978	3. International Cerebral Palsy Games	(Scotland) Edinburgh	July 1978		
4	1980	4. International Cerebral Palsy Games				
5	1982	5. International Cerebral Palsy Games	(Denmark) Greve			
6	1986	6. International Cerebral Palsy Games	(Belgium) Gits			
7	1989	Robin Hood CP World Games	(England) Nottingham			
8	1993	Robin Hood CP World Games	(England) Nottingham			
9	1997	Robin Hood CP World Games	(Netherlands) Delden	8 May	12 May	
10	2001	CPISRA World Games; Robin Hood CP World Games	(England) Nottingham	19 July	29 July	
11	2005	CPISRA World Games	(United States) New London	27 June	11 July	
12	2015	CPISRA World Games	(England) Nottingham	6 August	16 August	
13	2018	CPISRA World Games	(Spain) Sant Cugat del Vallès	9 August	12 August	
14	2023	World Abilitysport Games	Nakhon Ratchasima	3 December	9 December	

== See also ==
- International Federation of Cerebral Palsy Football
