= 2015 IFCPF CP Football World Championships =

Tournament details
- Host country: England
- Dates: 16 – 28 June 2015
- Teams: 16
- Venue: 1 (in 1 host city)

Final positions
- Champions: Russia
- Runners-up: Ukraine
- Third place: Brazil
- Fourth place: Netherlands

Tournament statistics
- Matches played: 43
- Goals scored: 209 (4.86 per match)
- Top scorer: (Russia) Volodymyr Antonyuk (12)

The 2015 IFCPF CP Football World Championships was the world championship for men's national 7-a-side association football teams. IFCPF stands for International Federation of Cerebral Palsy Football. Athletes with a physical disability competed. The Championship took place in the England from 16 to 28 June 2015.

Football CP Football was played with modified FIFA rules. Among the modifications were that there were seven players, no offside, a smaller playing field, and permission for one-handed throw-ins. Matches consisted of two thirty-minute halves, with a fifteen-minute half-time break. The Championships was a qualifying event for the Rio de Janeiro 2016 Paralympic Games.

== Participating teams and officials ==
=== Qualifying ===
The following teams are qualified for the tournament:

Means of qualification	Date	Venue	Berths	Qualified
Host nation			1	England
2013 Intercontinental Cup	27 July – 10 August 2013	Sant Cugat del Vallès, Spain	8	Argentina; Brazil (Republic of Ireland) Ireland; Netherlands; Russia; Scotland; Ukraine; United States
2010 American Cup; The next teams that were not yet qualified	19 – 26 September 2014	(Canada) Toronto, Kanada	2	Canada; Venezuela
2014 Asian Para Games	19 – 23 October 2014	Incheon, South Korea	2	(Iran) Iran^{1} Japan
2014 European Championships; The next teams that were not yet qualified	23 July – 2 August 2014	Maia, Portugal	2	Northern Ireland; Portugal
Oceania Region			1	Australia
Total			16	

1 = The Iranian CP football team drew their participation back shortly before the World Cup

=== The draw ===
During the draw, the teams were divided into pots because of rankings. Here, the following groups:

	Group A	Group B	Group C	Group D
Pot 1	Ukraine (2.)	Russia (1.)	Brazil (3.)	Netherlands (4.)
Pot 2	Iran (5.)^{1}	(Republic of Ireland) Ireland (7.*)	Scotland (7.*)	Argentina (6.)
Pot 3	England (10.)	Australia (12.)	United States (9.)	Canada (11.)
Pot 4	Japan (13.*)	Portugal (13.*)	Venezuela (17.)	Northern Ireland (13.*)
* The team is placed with another team in the world rankings ex equo.

1 = The Iranian CP football team drew their participation back shortly before the World Cup

=== Squads ===
The individual teams contact following football gamblers on to: Group A

Ukraine	England	Japan
1 Kostyantyn Symashko (GK); 2 Vitaliy Trushev (DF); 3 Yevhen Zinoviev (DF); 4 Taras Dutko (DF); 5 Oleh Len (FW); 6 Edhar Kahramanian (DF); 7 Vitalii Romanchuk (FW); 8 Denys Ponomarov (FW); 9 Dmytro Molodtsov (DF); 10 Stanislav Podolskyi (MF); 11 Volodymyr Antonyuk (MF); 12 Bohdan Kulynych (GK); 13 Artem Krasylnykov (MF); 14 Artem Sheremet (MF)	1 Giles Moore (GK); 2 Harry Barker (DF); 3 Karl Townshend (DF); 4 Matt Crossen (DF); 5 Jack Rutter (c) (MF); 6 Martin Sinclair (DF); 7 Michael Barker (FW); 8 James Blackwell (DF); 9 George Fletcher (MF); 10 Ibrahima Diallo (MF); 11 Ollie Nugent (MF); 12 Jake Brown (MF); 13 Ryan Kay (GK); 14 Emyle Rudder (MF)	1 Naoyoshi Henry Kagayama (GK); 2 Keisuke Kawabe (DF); 4 Hiroto Takahashi (MF); 5 Taisei Taniguchi (MF); 6 Yuji Yamada (MF); 7 Yuki Soma (MF); 8 Kazuhiro Kubo (MF); 9 Tetsuya Toda (DF); 10 Ryuta Yoshino (MF); 11 Tatsuhiro Ura (DF); 12 Shou Kuroda (MF); 14 Shotaro Osawa (FW); 16 Tenma Inoue (MF); 18 Hideyuki Yanagi (GK)
Coach: Serhii Ovcharenko	Coach: Keith Webb	Coach: Junichi Sano

Group B

Russia	(Republic of Ireland) Ireland	Australia	Portugal
3 Aslanbek Sapiev (DF); 6 Aleksey Tumakov (MF); 7 Alexey Chesmin (DF); 8 Ivan Potekhin (DF); 9 Eduard Ramonov (MF); 10 Dimitrii Pestretsov (FW); 12 Guram Chkareuli (GK); 13 Lasha Murvanadze (DF); 14 Georgiy Albegov (DF); 15 Viacheslav Larionov (MF); 16 Vladislav Raretckii (GK); 17 Zaurbek Pagaev (MF); 18 Aleksandr Kuligin (MF); 23 Alexei Borkin (FW)	1 Brian McGillivary (GK); 2 Joe Markey (DF); 3 Darragh Snell (MF); 4 Luke Evans (DF); 5 Eric O'Flaherty (MF); 6 Paraic Leacy (MF); 7 Gary Messett (MF); 8 Carl McKee (MF); 9 Aaron Tier (MF); 10 Dillon Sheridan (MF); 11 Peter Cotter (FW); 12 Ryan Nolan (FW); 13 Jason Moran (FW); 14 Simon Lestrange (GK)	1 Christopher Barty (GK); 2 Benjamin Roche (FW); 3 Jack Williams (MF); 6 Christopher Pyne (DF); 7 David Barber (DF); 8 Thomas Goodman (MF); 9 Ben Atkins (MF); 10 Connor Marsh (DF); 11 James Turner (MF); 12 Zachary Jones (DF/GK); 13 Jarrod Larkins-Law (FW); 14 Angus MacGregor (MF); 16 Cameron Gudgeon (MF); 19 Ned McCabe (GK)	1 Rui Miguel Ferreira Rocha (GK); 2 Ricardo Santos França (DF); 3 Hugo Manuel da Silva Pinheiro (MF); 4 Vasco João Gomes dos Santos (DF); 5 Rúben Miguel Sousa Oliveira (DF); 6 Cláudio Filipe Ferreira Nóvoa (MF); 7 Vítor Emanuel Ribeiro Vilarinho (MF); 8 Pedro Filipe Fernandes dos Santos (MF); 9 Tiago Carneiro (FW); 10 Tiago Ribeiro Baptista Ramos (FW); 11 André Ricardo Silva Ferreira (MF); 12 Sérgio Manuel Silva Barros (DF); 13 Lucas de Souza Semblano Pinheiro (MF); 14 Telmo Luís dos Santos Baptista (GK)
Coach: Avtandil Baramidze	Coach: Gerard Glynn	Coach: Kai Lammert	Coach: Vasco Miguel Santos Ferre

Group C

Brazil	Scotland	United States	Venezuela
1 Marcos Dos Santos Ferreira (GK); 2 Jonatas Santos Machado (MF); 3 Fernandes Celso Alves Vieira (DF); 4 Jose Carols Monteiro Guimarães (FW); 5 Felipe Rafael da Silva Gomes (MF); 6 Ubirajara da Silva Magalhães (MF); 7 Ronaldo de Souza Almeida (DF); 8 Evandro de Oliveira Gomes de Souza (FW); 9 Igor Romero Rocha (FW); 10 Wanderson Silva de Oliveira (FW); 11 Jan Francisco Brito da Costa (MF); 12 Wesley Martins de Souza (GK); 12 Diego Delgado da Silva (DF); 14 Gilvano Diniz da Silva (GK)	1 Craig Connel (GK); 2 Blair Glynn (DF/MF); 3 Martin Hickman (DF/MF); 4 Lewis McIntyre (DF/MF); 5 Ross MacMillan (DF/MF); 6 Ian Paton (DF/MF); 7 Mark Robertson (MF/FW); 8 Jamie Mitchell (DF/MF); 9 Kyle Hannin (MF/FW); 10 Jonathan Paterson (MF/FW); 11 Thomas Brown (DF/MF); 12 Martin Scott (GK); 13 Barry Halloran (FW); 14 Darren Aitken (MF/FW)	1 Keith Edward Johnson (GK); 2 Gavin James Sibayan (DF/MF); 3 Bryce Zachary Boarman (DF); 4 Tyler Allen Bennett (MF); 5 Jordan Andrew Weise (DF/MF); 6 Adam Kyle Ballou (DF); 7 Jarrett Paul Razon (MF); 9 Seth David Jahn (FW/GK); 10 Kevin Tyler Hensley (MF); 11 Mason Dane Abbiate (MF); 14 David Navarro Garza (DF); 19 Michael Robert Moore (FW); 23 Marthell Alonso Vazquez (FW/GK); 25 Rene Renteria (MF)	1 Frank Renee Pineda Teran (GK); 2 Gabriel Alfredo Medina Diaz (DF); 3 Peter Antoni Alvarado Gonzalez (DF); 4 Marco Tulio Cardenas Nieto (DF); 5 Daniel Enrique Sanchez (DF); 6 Richard Alexander Mogollon Melendez (MF); 7 Richard Alexander Alarcon Pacheco (MF); 8 Asdrubal Eusabio de Jesus Olicares Mora (MF); 9 Angel Evelio Molina Camacho (MF); 10 Jessi Junior Yari Villegas (FW); 11 Saul Eliecer Torres Villegas (DF); 12 Marlon Alexander Bello (GK); 17 Jose Luis Felipe Quintana (FW)
Coach: Dolvair Castelli	Coach: Andrew Smith	Coach: Stuart Sharp	Coach: Jose Luis Betancor Perez

Group D

Netherlands	Argentina	Canada	Northern Ireland
1 Stefan Boersma (GK); 2 George van Altena (GK); 3 Jeroen Schuitert (MF); 4 Jeroen Saedt (FW); 5 Teddy Witjes (DF); 6 Peter Kooij (MF); 7 Minne de Vos (MF); 8 Lars Conijn (DF); 9 Rik Rodenburg (FW); 10 Stephan Lokhoff (MF); 11 Iljas Visker (FW); 12 Guido Floors (MF); 14 Daan Dikken (MF); 15 Joey Mense (DF)	1 Claudio Omar Figuera (GK); 2 Pablo Matias Molina (DF); 3 Mariano Cortes (MF); 4 Rodrigo Adolfo Luquez (DF); 5 Matias Agustin Bassi (MF); 6 Maximiliano Sebastian Fernandez (DF); 7 Rodrigo Eloy Lugrin (MF); 8 Ezequiel Anibal Jaime (DF); 9 Duncan Coronel (FW); 10 Mariano Andres Morana (MF); 11 Matias Emiliano Fernandez (FW); 12 Gustavo Nahuelquin (GK); 13 Matías Salvat (FW); 13Juan Alberto Alabarce (FW)	1 Yuri Woodfall (GK); 2 Liam Stanley (MF); 3 Matt Gilbert (DF); 4 John Phillips (DF); 5 Sam Charron (MF); 6 Lucas Bruno (DF); 7 Dustin Hodgson (MF); 8 Vito Proietti (FW); 9 Trevor Stiles (MF); 10 Kyle Payne (DF); 11 Matthew Brown (DF); 12 Nick Heffernan (MF); 13 Samuel Denton (GK); 14 Damien Wojtiw (GK)	1 Gareth Miller (GK); 2 Darren Lemon (GK) / (DF); 3 Christian Canning (DF); 4 Cormac Birt (MF); 5 Jordan Cush (DF/MF); 6 Shea Tigh (DF); 7 Stephen Halpin (MF); 8 David Levy (MF); 9 Ryan Walker (FW); 10 Jordan Walker (MF); 11 Conor Lewsley (FW); 12 Alex Cossins (GK); 13 Charlie Fogarty (MF); 14 Harry Cheeseman (FW)
Coach: Marcel Geestman	Coach: Osvaldo Jorge Hernandez	Coach: Drew Ferguson	Coach: Malachy Donaghy

== Venue ==
The venue to be used for the World Championships were located in Burton-upon-Trent.

Burton-upon-Trent	2015 IFCPF CP Football World Championships is located in the United Kingdom
St George's Park National Football Centre	2015 IFCPF CP Football World Championships is located in the United Kingdom
Capacity: unknown	2015 IFCPF CP Football World Championships is located in the United Kingdom

== Format ==
The first round, or group stage, was a competition between the 16 teams divided among four groups of four, where each group engaged in a round-robin tournament within itself. The two highest ranked teams in each group advanced to the knockout stage for the position one to eight, the two lower ranked teams played for the positions nine to 16. Teams were awarded three points for a win and one for a draw. When comparing teams in a group over-all result came before head-to-head.

Tie-breaking criteria for group play
The ranking of teams in each group was based on the following criteria:
1. Number of points
2. Goal difference
3. Number of goals scored
4. Number of points obtained in matches between tied teams
5. Goal difference in matches between tied teams
6. Number of goals scored in matches between tied teams
7. Drawing of lots

In the knockout stage there were three rounds (quarter-finals, semi-finals and the final). The winners plays for the higher positions, the losers for the lower positions. For any match in the knockout stage, a draw after 60 minutes of regulation time was followed by two 10 minute periods of extra time to determine a winner. If the teams were still tied, a penalty shoot-out was held to determine a winner.

Classification
Athletes with a physical disability competed. The athlete's disability was caused by a non-progressive brain damage that affects motor control, such as cerebral palsy, traumatic brain injury or stroke. Athletes must be ambulant.

Players were classified by level of disability.

- C5: Athletes with difficulties when walking and running, but not in standing or when kicking the ball.
- C6: Athletes with control and co-ordination problems of their upper limbs, especially when running.
- C7: Athletes with hemiplegia.
- C8: Athletes with minimal disability; must meet eligibility criteria and have an impairment that has impact on the sport of football.

Teams must field at least one class C5 or C6 player at all times. No more than two players of class C8 are permitted to play at the same time.

== Group stage ==
The first round, or group stage, have seen the sixteen teams divided into four groups of four teams.

=== Group A ===
Pos	Team	Pld	W	D	L	GF	GA	GD	Pts	Qualified for
1	Ukraine	2	2	0	0	11	0	+11	6	Team play for the position 1 - 8
2	England	2	1	0	1	10	1	+9	3	Team play for the position 1 - 8
3	Japan	2	0	0	2	0	20	−20	0	Team play for the position 9 - 16
4	Iran	0	0	0	0	0	0	0	0	

Source: Cerebral Palsy Football World Champion - England 2015
Rules for classification: Tie-breaking criteria
16 June 2015
13:00

England	14–0	Japan
Rutter 4', 9', 20', 27', 36', 37'; Barker 7'; Blackwell 12', 23'; Brown 16', 51'; Rudder 27'; Nugent x2	Report

St George's Park National Football Centre,
Burton-upon-Trent
16 June 2015
15:00

Ukraine	^{1}	Iran

St George's Park National Football Centre,
Burton-upon-Trent
18 June 2015
17:00

Ukraine	16–0	Japan
Antonyuk 2', 6', 19', 22', 25', 30', 34', 48'; Sheremet 8'; Krasylnykov 21', 29', 50'; Romanchuk 47', 49', 53'; Kahramanian 60'	Report

St George's Park National Football Centre,
Burton-upon-Trent
18 June 2015
19:00

England	^{1}	Iran

St George's Park National Football Centre,
Burton-upon-Trent
20 June 2015
17:00

Iran	^{1}	Japan

St George's Park National Football Centre,
Burton-upon-Trent
20 June 2015
17:00

England	0–1	Ukraine
	Report	Antonyuk 17'

St George's Park National Football Centre,
Burton-upon-Trent

=== Group B ===
Pos	Team	Pld	W	D	L	GF	GA	GD	Pts	Qualified for
1	Russia	3	3	0	0	22	1	+21	9	Team play for the position 1 - 8
2	(Republic of Ireland) Ireland	3	2	0	1	13	9	+4	6	Team play for the position 1 - 8
3	Australia	3	1	0	2	3	9	−6	3	Team play for the position 9 - 16
4	Portugal	3	0	0	3	0	19	−19	0	Team play for the position 9 - 16

Source: Cerebral Palsy Football World Champion - England 2015
Rules for classification: Tie-breaking criteria
16 June 2015
17:00

Australia	2–0	Portugal
Turner 32', 60'	Report

St George's Park National Football Centre,
Burton-upon-Trent
16 June 2015
19:00

Russia	8–1	(Republic of Ireland) Ireland
Ramonov 3', 44', 55'; Pestretsov 14', 29'; Larionov 16'; Kuligin 54'; Borkin 55'	Report	Messett 11'

St George's Park National Football Centre,
Burton-upon-Trent
18 June 2015
11:00

Russia	9–0	Portugal
Kuligin 16'; Ramonov 17'; Sapiev 18', 27'; Albegov 21'; Chesmin 42'; Borkin 55'; Potekhin 59'; Pagaev 60'	Report

St George's Park National Football Centre,
Burton-upon-Trent
18 June 2015
13:00

Australia	1–4	(Republic of Ireland) Ireland
Barber 49'	Report	Messett 8'; Sheridan 38', 60'; O'Flaherty 51'

St George's Park National Football Centre,
Burton-upon-Trent
20 June 2015
13:00

Ireland (Republic of Ireland)	8–0	Portugal
Messett 1', 3'; Sheridan 3', 10', 12', 30'; Snell 8'; Evans 54'	Report

St George's Park National Football Centre,
Burton-upon-Trent
20 June 2015
13:00

Australia	0–5	Russia
	Report	Ramonov 4'; Kuligin 9'; Murvanadze 13'; Tumakov 31'; Chesmin 51'

St George's Park National Football Centre,
Burton-upon-Trent

=== Group C ===
Pos	Team	Pld	W	D	L	GF	GA	GD	Pts	Qualified for
1	Brazil	3	3	0	0	18	0	+18	9	Team play for the position 1 - 8
2	United States	3	2	0	1	5	7	−2	6	Team play for the position 1 - 8
3	Scotland	3	1	0	2	6	8	−2	3	Team play for the position 9 - 16
4	Venezuela	3	0	0	3	0	14	−14	0	Team play for the position 9 - 16

Source: Cerebral Palsy Football World Champion - England 2015
Rules for classification: Tie-breaking criteria
17 June 2015
11:00

United States	3–0	Venezuela
Hensley 13', 36'; Boarman 43'	Report

St George's Park National Football Centre,
Burton-upon-Trent
17 June 2015
13:00

Brazil	6–0	Scotland
Brito da Costa 4'; Vieira 14'; Silva de Oliveira 19'; Guimarães 52', 57'; Machado 56'	Report

St George's Park National Football Centre,
Burton-upon-Trent
19 June 2015
17:00

Brazil	6–0	Venezuela
Gomes de Souza 11'; Rocha 14' da Silva Gomes 16'; Machado 22'; Guimarães 44', 49'	Report

St George's Park National Football Centre,
Burton-upon-Trent
19 June 2015
19:00

United States	2–1	Scotland
Halloran 34' (o.g.); Jahn 39'	Report	Paterson 14'

St George's Park National Football Centre,
Burton-upon-Trent
21 June 2015
17:00

Scotland	5–0	Venezuela
Hickman 1', 24', 58'; Mitchell 40'; Aitken 51'	Report

St George's Park National Football Centre,
Burton-upon-Trent
21 June 2015
17:00

United States	0–6	Brazil
	Report	da Silva Magalhães 10'; Silva de Oliveira 14', 39'; Vieira 16'; Guimarães 27' da Silva Gomes 59'

St George's Park National Football Centre,
Burton-upon-Trent

=== Group D ===
Pos	Team	Pld	W	D	L	GF	GA	GD	Pts	Qualified for
1	Netherlands	3	3	0	0	12	2	+10	9	Team play for the position 1 - 8
2	Argentina	3	1	1	1	6	7	−1	4	Team play for the position 1 - 8
3	Canada	3	1	0	2	4	7	−3	3	Team play for the position 9 - 16
4	Northern Ireland	3	0	1	2	4	10	−6	1	Team play for the position 9 - 16

Source: Cerebral Palsy Football World Champion - England 2015
Rules for classification: Tie-breaking criteria
17 June 2015
17:00

Canada	3–1	Northern Ireland
Hodgson 1'; Stiles 37'; Charron 48'	Report	Birt 32'

St George's Park National Football Centre,
Burton-upon-Trent
17 June 2015
19:00

Netherlands	4–1	Argentina
Vos 10'; Visker (16"), 45'; Conijn 46'	Report	Bassi 26'

St George's Park National Football Centre,
Burton-upon-Trent
19 June 2015
11:00

Netherlands	4–0	Northern Ireland
Saedt 41'; Vos 44', 60'; Kooij 60'	Report

St George's Park National Football Centre,
Burton-upon-Trent
19 June 2015
13:00

Canada	0–2	Argentina
	Report	M. E. Fernandez 9'; Bassi 41'

St George's Park National Football Centre,
Burton-upon-Trent
21 June 2015
13:00

Argentina	3–3	Northern Ireland
24' (o.g.); Lugrin 56'; Morana 59'	Report	Levy 11'; R. Walker 25'; J. Walker 45'

St George's Park National Football Centre,
Burton-upon-Trent
21 June 2015
13:00

Canada	1–4	Netherlands
Charron 1'	Report	Visker 25'; Kooij 49'; Saedt 60'; Conijn 60'

St George's Park National Football Centre,
Burton-upon-Trent

== Knockout stage ==
=== Quarter-finals ===
Position 9-16

23 June 2015
10:30

Canada	2–1	Venezuela
Stiles 36', 44'	Report	Villegas 20'

St George's Park National Football Centre,
Burton-upon-Trent

23 June 2015
13:00

Scotland	2–1	Northern Ireland
Mitchell 4'; Robertson 49'	Report	J. Walker 11'

St George's Park National Football Centre,
Burton-upon-Trent

23 June 2015
16:30

Australia	v	bye

St George's Park National Football Centre,
Burton-upon-Trent

23 June 2015
19:00

Japan	2–6	Portugal
Taniguchi 46'; Toda 47'	Report	Ramos 3', 10'; 28'; Carneiro 8' da Silva Pinheiro 25'; Vilarinho 44'

St George's Park National Football Centre,
Burton-upon-Trent

Position 1-8

24 June 2015
10:30

Netherlands	2–1 (a.e.t.)	United States
Schuitert 39'; Kooij 78'	Report	Van Altena 47'

St George's Park National Football Centre,
Burton-upon-Trent

24 June 2015
13:00

Brazil	4–0	Argentina
Guimarães 2', 54'; Brito da Costa 7', 30'	Report

St George's Park National Football Centre,
Burton-upon-Trent

24 June 2015
16:30

Russia	5–0	England
Pestretsov 6'; Albegov 25'; Ramonov 30'; Potekhin 39'; Kuligin 51'	Report

St George's Park National Football Centre,
Burton-upon-Trent

24 June 2015
19:00

Ukraine	4–0	(Republic of Ireland) Ireland
Zinoviev 3'; Romanchuk 6'; Antonyuk 22', 47'	Report

St George's Park National Football Centre,
Burton-upon-Trent

=== Semi-finals ===
Position 13-16

25 June 2015
10:30

Northern Ireland	v	bye

St George's Park National Football Centre,
Burton-upon-Trent

25 June 2015
13:00

Venezuela	2–1	Japan
Villegas 2'; Melendez 18'	Report	Osawa 30'

St George's Park National Football Centre,
Burton-upon-Trent

Position 9-12

25 June 2015
16:30

Scotland	6–0	Australia
Mitchell 2'; Halloran 4', 36'; Paton 22'; Hannin 35', 57'	Report

St George's Park National Football Centre,
Burton-upon-Trent

25 June 2015
19:00

Canada	1–0	Portugal
Stiles 32'	Report

St George's Park National Football Centre,
Burton-upon-Trent

Position 5-8

26 June 2015
10:30

Argentina	0–1	(Republic of Ireland) Ireland
	Report	Evans 54'

St George's Park National Football Centre,
Burton-upon-Trent

26 June 2015
13:00

United States	0–10	England
	Report	Brown 7', 16'; Rutter 24'; Blackwell 29', 38'; 36' (o.g.); Crossen 43'; Nugent 43', 51'; Barker 44'

St George's Park National Football Centre,
Burton-upon-Trent

Position 1-4

26 June 2015
16:30

Brazil	1–2	Ukraine
Silva de Oliveira 18'	Report	Antonyuk 8'; Krasylnykov 46'

St George's Park National Football Centre,
Burton-upon-Trent

26 June 2015
19:00

Netherlands	0–6	Russia
	Report	Ramonov 26'; 27' (o.g.); Pestretsov 40'; Larionov 41'; Potekhin 44'; Borkin 46'

St George's Park National Football Centre,
Burton-upon-Trent

== Finals ==
Position 15-16

27 June 2015
10:30

bye	v	Japan

St George's Park National Football Centre,
Burton-upon-Trent

Position 13-14

27 June 2015
11:30

Northern Ireland	0–1	Venezuela
	Report	Villegas 53'

St George's Park National Football Centre,
Burton-upon-Trent

Position 11-12

27 June 2015
13:00

Australia	1–1 (a.e.t.)	Portugal
Pyne 11'	Report	da Silva Pinheiro 7'
Penalties
	(4–3p)

St George's Park National Football Centre,
Burton-upon-Trent

Position 9-10

27 June 2015
15:30

Scotland	5–3 (a.e.t.)	Canada
Hannin 38'; Hickman 41'; Paton 64'; Paterson 78'; Halloran 80'	Report	Stiles 45', 56', 66'

St George's Park National Football Centre,
Burton-upon-Trent

Position 7-8

27 June 2015
16:30

Argentina	1–4	United States
M. E. Fernandez 46'	Report	Garza 30', 59'; Jahn; Ballou 57'

St George's Park National Football Centre,
Burton-upon-Trent

Position 5-6

27 June 2015
19:00

Ireland (Republic of Ireland)	0–2	England
	Report	Crossen 27'; Rutter 52'

St George's Park National Football Centre,
Burton-upon-Trent

Position 3-4

28 June 2015
11:30

Brazil	6–0	Netherlands
Silva de Oliveira 7', 11', 39'; Vieira 33', 36'; Gomes de Souza 59'	Report

St George's Park National Football Centre,
Burton-upon-Trent

Final

28 June 2015
15:00

Ukraine	0–1	Russia
	Report	Kuligin 44'

St George's Park National Football Centre,
Burton-upon-Trent

== Statistics ==
=== Goalscorers ===
12 goals

- (Russia) Volodymyr Antonyuk

8 goals

- (England) Jack Rutter

7 goals

- (Russia) Eduard Ramonov
- (Canada) Trevor Stiles

6 goals

- (Brazil) Jose Carols Monteiro Guimarães
- (Republic of Ireland) Dillon Sheridan
- (Brazil) Wanderson Silva de Oliveira

5 goals

- (Russia) Aleksandr Kuligin

4 goals

- (England) James Blackwell
- (England) Jake Brown
- (Ukraine) Artem Krasylnykov
- (Russia) Dimitrii Pestretsov
- (Ukraine) Vitalii Romanchuk
- (Brazil) Fernandes Celso Alves Vieira

3 goals

- (Russia) Alexei Borkin
- (Brazil) Jan Francisco Brito da Costa
- (Scotland) Barry Halloran
- (Scotland) Martin Hickman
- (Netherlands) Peter Kooij
- (Russia) Ivan Potekhin
- (Venezuela) Jessi Junior Yari Villegas
- (Netherlands) Iljas Visker

2 goals

- (Russia) Georgiy Albegov
- (England) Harry Barker
- (Argentina) Matias Agustin Bassi
- (Canada) Sam Charron
- (Russia) Alexey Chesmin
- (England) Matt Crossen
- (Brazil) Felipe Rafael da Silva Gomes
- (Portugal) Hugo Manuel da Silva Pinheiro
- (Republic of Ireland) Luke Evans
- (Argentina) Matias Emiliano Fernandez
- (United States) David Navarro Garza
- (Brazil) Evandro de Oliveira Gomes de Souza
- (Scotland) Kyle Hannin
- (United States) Kevin Tyler Hensley
- (United States) Seth David Jahn
- (Russia) Viacheslav Larionov
- (Brazil) Jonatas Santos Machado
- (Republic of Ireland) Gary Messett
- (Scotland) Jamie Mitchell
- (England) Ollie Nugent
- (Scotland) Jonathan Paterson
- (Scotland) Ian Paton
- (Portugal) Tiago Ribeiro Baptista Ramos
- (Netherlands) Jeroen Saedt
- (Russia) Aslanbek Sapiev
- (Netherlands) Minne de Vos
- (Northern Ireland) Jordan Walker

1 goal

- (Scotland) Darren Aitken
- (United States) Adam Kyle Ballou
- (Australia) David Barber
- (United States) Bryce Zachary Boarman
- (Netherlands) Lars Conijn
- (Northern Ireland) Cormac Birt
- (Brazil) Ubirajara da Silva Magalhães
- (Canada) Dustin Hodgson
- (Ukraine) Edhar Kahramanian
- (Northern Ireland) David Levy
- (Argentina) Rodrigo Eloy Lugrin
- (Venezuela) Richard Alexander Mogollon Melendez
- (Argentina) Mariano Andres Morana
- (Russia) Lasha Murvanadze
- (Republic of Ireland) Eric O'Flaherty
- (Japan) Shotaro Osawa
- (Russia) Zaurbek Pagaev
- (Australia) Christopher Pyne
- (Scotland) Mark Robertson
- (England) Emyle Rudder
- (Netherlands) Jeroen Schuitert
- (Ukraine) Artem Sheremet
- (Republic of Ireland) Darragh Snell
- (Japan) Taisei Taniguchi
- (Portugal) Tiago Carneiro
- (Japan) Tetsuya Toda
- (Russia) Aleksey Tumakov
- (Australia) James Turner
- (Netherlands) George van Altena
- (Portugal) Vítor Emanuel Ribeiro Vilarinho
- (Northern Ireland) Ryan Walker
- (Ukraine) Yevhen Zinoviev

own goals

- (Scotland) Barry Halloran
- (Netherlands) ??
- (Northern Ireland) ??
- (United States) ??

=== Ranking ===
Rank	Team
Gold medal	Russia
Silver medal	Ukraine
Bronze medal	Brazil
4.	Netherlands
5.	England
6.	(Republic of Ireland) Ireland
7.	United States
8.	Argentina
9.	Scotland
10.	Canada
11.	Portugal
12.	Australia
13.	Venezuela
14.	Northern Ireland
15.	Japan
