= 2013 CPISRA Football 7-a-side Intercontinental Cup =

Tournament details
- Host country: Spain
- Dates: 27 July – 10 August 2013
- Teams: 16
- Venue(s): 3 (in 1 host city)

Final positions
- Champions: Ukraine
- Runners-up: Brazil
- Third place: Russia
- Fourth place: (Republic of Ireland) Ireland

Tournament statistics
- Matches played: 48
- Goals scored: 267 (5.56 per match)
- Top scorer(s): (Ukraine) Oleksandr Devlysh (9)

The 2013 CPISRA Football 7-a-side Intercontinental Cup was an international championship for men's national 7-a-side association football teams. CPISRA stands for Cerebral Palsy International Sports & Recreation Association. Athletes with a physical disability competed. The Championship took place in the Sant Cugat del Vallès from 27 July to 10 August 2013.

Football 7-a-side was played with modified FIFA rules. Among the modifications were that there were seven players, no offside, a smaller playing field, and permission for one-handed throw-ins. Matches consisted of two thirty-minute halves, with a fifteen-minute half-time break. The Championships was a qualifying event for the 2015 IFCPF CP Football World Championships.

== Participating teams and officials ==
=== Qualifying ===
The following teams are qualified for the tournament:

Means of qualification	Date	Venue	Berths	Qualified
Host nation			1	Spain
2010 American Cup	17 – 27 October 2010	Buenos Aires, Argentina	5	Argentina; Brazil; Canada; United States; Venezuela
2010 Asian Para Games	12 – 19 December 2010	Guangzhou, China	1	Japan
2010 European Championships	17 – 28 August 2010	Glasgow, Scotland	8	England (Republic of Ireland) Ireland; Netherlands; Northern Ireland; Portugal; Russia; Scotland; Ukraine
Oceania Region			1	Australia
Total			16	

=== The draw ===
During the draw, the teams were divided into pots because of rankings. Here, the following groups:

	Group A	Group B	Group C	Group D
Pot 1	Netherlands	Russia	Ukraine	Brazil
Pot 2	Scotland	(Republic of Ireland) Ireland	United States	Argentina
Pot 3	Canada	England	Portugal	Northern Ireland
Pot 4	Spain	Venezuela	Australia	Japan

=== Squads ===
Group A

Netherlands	Scotland	Canada	Spain
George Van Altena (GK); Stephan Lokhoff; Gerad Arends; Joey Mense; Lars Conijn; Minne de Vos; Peter Kooij; Rik Rondenburg; Pawel Statema; John Swinkels (FW); Daan Dikken; Iljas Visker; Myron Gebbink; Stefan Boersma (GK)	Ross Russell; Craig Connell; Blair Glynn; Jamie Trevit; Jonathan Paterson; Mark Robertson; Martin Hickman; Scott Martin; James Richmond; Thomas Brown; Anton Clark; Jaime Mitchell; Jonathan O'Hara; Scott Troup	Yuri Woodfall (GK); Derek Whitson; John Phillips; Liam Stanley; Samuel Charron; Dustin Hodgson; Matthew Brown; Stiles Trevor; Chris Duehrsen; Jamie Ackinclose; Geoff Wakefield; Kyle Payne; Matthew Gilbert; Sean Freeman	Jorge Peleteiro; Carlos Rodriguez; Ramón del Pino; Aitor Ariño; Carlos Anton; Daniel Manjón; Sergio Clemente; Noe Adell; Raúl Pacheco; Leandro Pérez; Daniel Palau; Emilio Ribeiro; Enrique Tejerina; Sergio Álvarez

Group B

Russia	(Republic of Ireland) Ireland	England	Venezuela
Eduard Ramonov; Viacheslav Larionov; Aslanbek Sapiev; Zaurbek Pegaev; Lasha Murvanadze; Aleksandr Kuligin; Vladislav Raretskiy; Mamuka Dzimistarishvili; Aleksey Tumakov; Alexey Chesmin; Ivan Potekhin; Guram Chkareuli; Alexander Lekov; Georgiy Albegov	Joseph Markey; Luke Evans; Daragh Snell; Ryan Nolan; Daragh Byrne; Gary Messet; Simon Le'Strange; Tom Badun; Dillon Sheridan; Aaron Tier; Brian McGillivary; Eric O'Flaherty; Pedraig Lacey; Peter Cotter	George Fletcher; Matthew Dimbylow; Martin Sinclair; Nicholas Fish; Emyle Rudder; Michael Barker; Harry Baker; Alexander Mullin; Jack Rutter; Ryan Kay; Oliver Nugent; Ryan Taylor; Karl Townshend; Thomas Smith	Brayan Andrés Moreno; Ángel Evelio Molina; Wilman Jesús Ortega; Frank René Pineda; Saul Eliecer Torres; Daniel Enrique Sánchez; José Leonardo Gimon; Luis Alfredo Gutierrez; Marcos Tulio Cárdenas; Wuarion Jesús Mendoza; Angel Finalo; Ismar Johan Casares; Jose Carapaica; Marlon Alexander Bello; Yonfer Orladno Zamora

Group C

Ukraine	United States	Portugal	Australia
Kostyantyn Symashko; Vitaliy Trushev; Bohdan Kulinich; Taras Dutko; Ivan Shkvarlo; Denys Ponomaryov; Dmytro Hetman; Dmytro Molodtsov; Ivan Dotsenko; Mykola Mikhovych; Oleksandr Devlysh; Volodymyr Antonyuk; Vitalii Romanchuk; Yevhen Zinoviev	Keith Johnson; Chris Ahrens; Bryce Boarman; Vincent Juarez; Syllebram Diaz; Gavin Sibayan; Alexander Hendricks; Marthell Vazquez; Jackson McCabe; Rene Renteria; Nick Creasy; Josh McKinney; Moises Morales; Tyler Bennett	Rui Rocha; Vitor Vilarinho; André Ricardo Silva Ferreira; Ruben Oliveira; Tiago Carneiro; Pedro Santos; Tiago Ramos; Aurelio Ribeiro; Nuno Bogas; Pedro Nuno Machado Silva; Fernando da Silva; Francisco Dias; Sérgio Barros; Tiago Correira	Chris Barty (GK); David Barber (DF); Jack Williams (DF); Thomas Goodman (DF); Ben Atkins (MF); Chris Pyne (MF); Connor Marsh (MF); James Turner (MF); Michael Debenham (MF); Ryan Kinner (MF); Scott Kennedy (MF); Beau Menzies (FW); Jarrod Larkins-Law (FW); Ned McCabe (FW)

Group D

Brazil	Argentina	Northern Ireland	Japan
Marcos Ferreira (GK); Wanderson Silva de Oliveira; Jose Carlos Guimaraes; Cleiton Oliveira; Ronaldo de Souza Almeida; Jan Francisco Costa; Fernandes Vieira; Yurig Ribeiro; Luciano Silva; Antonio Silva; Evandro Souza; Joao Batista Araújo; Marcos Yuri Costa; Moises Silva (GK)	Sergio Nahuel Gutierrez (GK); Rodrigo Eloy Lugrín; Ezequiel Anival Jaime; Claudio Omar Figuera; Mariano Andrés Morana; Rodrigo Adolfo Luquez; Fabricio Gabriel Alvarez; Matias Fernandez; Maximiliano Fernandez; Fabio Miguel Coria; Brian David Vivot; Ezequiel Hefling; Gustavo Diego Nanuelquin; Horacio Netchovitch; Juan Albert Alabarce	Jordan Kearns; Christian Canning; Ryan Walker; Cormac Birt; Darren Lemon; David Leavy; Stephen Halpin; Adam Carson; Andrew Young; Dean Fegan; Jonathan Prenter; Marc Smith; Thomas McCormick; William Hamilton	Yuki Soma; Kodai Nakaoka; Tsukasa Kawano; Taisei Taniguchi; Tatsuhiro Ura; Kenji Fukuoka; Ryuta Yoshino; Hisato Ozaki; Takashi Kashimura

== Venues ==
The venues to be used for the Intercontinental Cup were located in Sant Cugat del Vallès.

Sant Cugat del Vallès			2013 CPISRA Football 7-a-side Intercontinental Cup is located in Spain
Zona Esportiva Municipal; Jaume Tubau	Zona Esportiva Municipal; La Guinardera	Camp de Futbol; Can Magí	2013 CPISRA Football 7-a-side Intercontinental Cup is located in Spain
Capacity: unknown	Capacity: unknown	Capacity: unknown	2013 CPISRA Football 7-a-side Intercontinental Cup is located in Spain

== Format ==
The first round, or group stage, was a competition between the 16 teams divided among four groups of four, where each group engaged in a round-robin tournament within itself. The two highest ranked teams in each group advanced to the knockout stage for the position one to eight. the two lower ranked teams plays for the positions nine to 16. Teams were awarded three points for a win and one for a draw. When comparing teams in a group over-all result came before head-to-head.

Tie-breaking criteria for group play
The ranking of teams in each group was based on the following criteria:
1. Number of points
2. Goal difference
3. Number of goals scored
4. Number of points obtained in matches between tied teams
5. Goal difference in matches between tied teams
6. Number of goals scored in matches between tied teams
7. Drawing of lots

In the knockout stage there were three rounds (quarter-finals, semi-finals, and the final). The winners plays for the higher positions, the losers for the lower positions. For any match in the knockout stage, a draw after 60 minutes of regulation time was followed by two 10 minute periods of extra time to determine a winner. If the teams were still tied, a penalty shoot-out was held to determine a winner.

Classification
Athletes with a physical disability competed. The athlete's disability was caused by a non-progressive brain damage that affects motor control, such as cerebral palsy, traumatic brain injury or stroke. Athletes must be ambulant.

Players were classified by level of disability.

- C5: Athletes with difficulties when walking and running, but not in standing or when kicking the ball.
- C6: Athletes with control and co-ordination problems of their upper limbs, especially when running.
- C7: Athletes with hemiplegia.
- C8: Athletes with minimal disability; must meet eligibility criteria and have an impairment that has impact on the sport of football.

Teams must field at least one class C5 or C6 player at all times. No more than two players of class C8 are permitted to play at the same time.

== Group stage ==
The first round, or group stage, have seen the sixteen teams divided into four groups of four teams.

=== Group A ===
Pos	Team	Pld	W	D	L	GF	GA	GD	Pts	Qualified for
1	Netherlands	3	3	0	0	15	1	+14	9	Team play for the position 1 - 8
2	Scotland	3	2	0	1	12	4	+8	6	Team play for the position 1 - 8
3	Canada	3	1	0	2	8	15	−7	3	Team play for the position 9 - 16
4	Spain	3	0	0	3	1	17	−16	0	Team play for the position 9 - 16

Source: 2013 CPISRA Intercontinental Cup
Rules for classification: Tie-breaking criteria
27 July 2013
20:30

Spain	1–6	Canada
Peleteiro 6'	Report	Duehrsen 16' (o.g.); Ackinclose 30'; Brown 37', 46', 58'; Charron 41'

ZEM Jaume Tubau
28 July 2013
9:30

Netherlands	2–1	Scotland
Conijn 4'; Visker 54'	Report	Paterson 42'

ZEM Jaume Tubau
30 July 2013
9:30

Netherlands	8–0	Canada
Lokhoff 2', 17'; Arends 13', 25', 33'; Conijn 40'; Visker 46', 52'	Report

no information
30 July 2013
11:30

Scotland	6–0	Spain
Hickman 2'; Robertson 4'; Paterson 17', 27', 58'; Mitchell 37'	Report

ZEM Jaume Tubau
1 August 2013
11:30

Canada	2–5	Scotland
Trevor 5', 57'	Report	Glynn 9'; Robertson 14'; Brown 30', 59'; Hickman 37'

CdF Can Magí
1 August 2013
11:30

Spain	0–5	Netherlands
	Report	Visker 12'; Arends 50', 51' de Vos 60'; Dikken 60'

ZEM Jaume Tubau

=== Group B ===
Pos	Team	Pld	W	D	L	GF	GA	GD	Pts	Qualified for
1	Russia	3	3	0	0	19	1	+18	9	Team play for the position 1 - 8
2	(Republic of Ireland) Ireland	3	2	0	1	10	8	+2	6	Team play for the position 1 - 8
3	England	3	1	0	2	6	11	−5	3	Team play for the position 9 - 16
4	Venezuela	3	0	0	3	1	16	−15	0	Team play for the position 9 - 16

Source: 2013 CPISRA Intercontinental Cup
Rules for classification: Tie-breaking criteria
28 July 2013
11:30

Russia	6–0	(Republic of Ireland) Ireland
Kuligin 7'; Ramonov 11', 25', 58'; Chesmin 45'; Larionov 48'	Report

no information
28 July 2013
19:30

England	4–0	Venezuela
Fish 2', 19'; Barker 22'; Smith 30'	Report

no information
30 July 2013
17:30

Russia	8–0	England
Kuligin 6', 50'; Chesmin 25', 29'; Pegaev 34', 36', 55'; Albegov 53'	Report

ZEM Jaume Tubau
30 July 2013
19:30

(Republic of Ireland) Ireland	7–0	Venezuela
Sheridan 8', 18', 43', 46'; Byrne 16'; Evans 21'; Nolan 55'	Report

ZEM Jaume Tubau
1 August 2013
19:30

(Republic of Ireland) Ireland	3–2	England
Messet 1'; Badun 29'; Snell 29'	Report	Rutter 10', 16'

CdF Can Magí
1 August 2013
19:30

Venezuela	1–5	Russia
Torres 50'	Report	Dzimistarishvili 6', 28'; Tumakov 9', 56'; Chesmin 10'

ZEM Jaume Tubau

=== Group C ===
Pos	Team	Pld	W	D	L	GF	GA	GD	Pts	Qualified for
1	Ukraine	3	3	0	0	17	1	+16	9	Team play for the position 1 - 8
2	United States	3	2	0	1	5	8	−3	6	Team play for the position 1 - 8
3	Portugal	3	1	0	2	4	8	−4	3	Team play for the position 9 - 16
4	Australia	3	0	0	3	0	9	−9	0	Team play for the position 9 - 16

Source: 2013 CPISRA Intercontinental Cup
Rules for classification: Tie-breaking criteria
29 July 2013
9:30

Ukraine	6–0	United States
Shkvarlo 9', 50', 58'; Romanchuk 15', 20'; Antonyuk 56'	Report

no information
29 July 2013
11:30

Australia	0–1	Portugal
	Report	Silva Ferreira 54'

ZEM Jaume Tubau
31 July 2013
9:30

Ukraine	6–0	Australia
Devlysh 2', 4', 7'; Zinoviev 16'; Ponomaryov 51', 53'	Report

no information
31 July 2013
11:30

United States	3–2	Portugal
Renteria 30'; Vazquez 58'; Bennett 59'	Report	Vilarinho 29'; Carneiro 53'

ZEM Jaume Tubau
2 August 2013
11:30

United States	2–0	Australia
McKinney 27'; Renteria 54'	Report

CdF Can Magí
2 August 2013
11:30

Portugal	1–5	Ukraine
Santos 41'	Report	Shkvarlo 6', 46'; Devlysh 13', 22'; Dutko 29'

ZEM Jaume Tubau

=== Group D ===
Pos	Team	Pld	W	D	L	GF	GA	GD	Pts	Qualified for
1	Brazil	3	3	0	0	26	0	+26	9	Team play for the position 1 - 8
2	Argentina	3	2	0	1	16	7	+9	6	Team play for the position 1 - 8
3	Northern Ireland	3	1	0	2	7	11	−4	3	Team play for the position 9 - 16
4	Japan	3	0	0	3	0	31	−31	0	Team play for the position 9 - 16

Source: 2013 CPISRA Intercontinental Cup
Rules for classification: Tie-breaking criteria
29 July 2013
17:30

Brazil	7–0	Argentina
J. Costa 2', 47'; Ferreira 13'; Silva de Oliveira 22'; R. Almeida 37', 57'; A. Silva 53'	Report

no information
29 July 2013
19:30

Japan	0–7	Northern Ireland
	Report	Walker 1', 21', 46'; Leavy 9', 25'; Birt 24'; Kearns 48'

no information
31 July 2013
17:30

Brazil	11–0	Japan
M. Costa 1', 17'; Vieira 5', 12'; E. Souza 6', 31'; C. Oliveira 8'; Araújo 23', 56'; L. Silva 32', 42'	Report

ZEM Jaume Tubau
31 July 2013
19:30

Argentina	3–0	Northern Ireland
Lugrín 20', 45'; Coria 34'	Report

ZEM Jaume Tubau
2 August 2013
19:30

Argentina	13–0	Japan
Matias Fernandez 6'; Morana 28', 32', 38', 46'; Alabarce 33'; Luquez 33', 41', 44', 48'; Jaime 35', 55'; Alvarez 57'	Report

CdF Can Magí
2 August 2013
19:30

Northern Ireland	0–8	Brazil
	Report	Silva de Oliveira 3', 16'; R. Almeida 8', 29'; E. Souza 47'; L. Silva 9'; Vieira 26'; M. Costa 56'

ZEM Jaume Tubau

== Knockout stage ==
=== Quarter-finals ===
Position 9-16

4 August 2013
9:30

England	5–1	Spain
Mullin 27'; Rutter 33', 38', 59'; Baker 34'	Report	Pacheco 47'

ZEM Jaume Tubau

4 August 2013
11:30

Canada	2–0	Venezuela
Stanley 4'; Ackinclose 36'	Report

ZEM Jaume Tubau

5 August 2013
9:30

Northern Ireland	1–0	Australia
Birt 41'	Report

ZEM Jaume Tubau

5 August 2013
11:30

Portugal	4–1	Japan
Ramos 1'; Silva de Oliveira 9'; Santos 43'; Bogas 58'	Report	Taniguchi 57'

no information

Position 1-8

4 August 2013
17:30

Netherlands	2–3	(Republic of Ireland) Ireland
Lokhoff 10'; Conijn 18'	Report	Snell 32'; Messet 45'; Sheridan 58'

no information

4 August 2013
19:30

Russia	5–0	Scotland
Murvanadze 7'; Kuligin 16'; Pegaev 22'; Ramonov 24'; Dzimistarishvili 29'	Report

no information

5 August 2013
17:30

Brazil	6–0	United States
J. Costa 12', 18'; R. Almeida 27'; Silva de Oliveira 31', 50'; A. Silva 53'	Report

no information

5 August 2013
19:30

Ukraine	7–1	Argentina
Devlysh 14'; Antonyuk 20'; Trushev 30', 44'; Romanchuk 52'; Molodtsov 54'; Dutko 57'	Report	Morana 13'

no information

=== Semi-finals ===
Position 12-16

7 August 2013
9:30

Venezuela	1–0	Japan
Moreno 60'	Report

no information

8 August 2013
9:30

Spain	0–3	Australia
	Report	Barber 30'; Kinner 36'; Marsh 54'

ZEM Jaume Tubau

Position 9-12

7 August 2013
17:30

Canada	4–4(a.e.t.)(1–1p)	Portugal
R. Oliveira 19', 52'; Brown 55'; Trevor 58'; Hodgson 75'	Report	Silva Ferreira 6', 45'; Santos 9'; Ramos 35', 69'

no information

8 August 2013
17:30

England	12–1	Northern Ireland
Rudder 3', 31'; Barker 5', 29', 37', 49', 51'; Townshend 11'; Smith 18'; Rutter 27'; Nugent 36'; Sinclair 59'	Report	Birt 23'

no information

Position 5-8

7 August 2013
11:30

Netherlands	4–4(a.e.t.)(6–4p)	United States
Kooij 4', 42', 56'; Conijn 34'; Rondenburg 66'; Visker 79'	Report	McKinney 20'; Renteria 50', 52'; Ahrens 58'

ZEM Jaume Tubau

8 August 2013
11:30

Scotland	3–6	Argentina
Paterson 14', 22', 31'	Report	Matias Fernandez 7', 29'; Lugrín 10'; Morana 29', 32'; Lugrín 54'

ZEM Jaume Tubau

Position 1-4

7 August 2013
19:30

(Republic of Ireland) Ireland	0–9	Ukraine
	Report	Devlysh 18', 23', 31'; Antonyuk 24'; Dutko 26', 28'; Romanchuk 51', 60'; Ponomaryov 58'

ZEM Jaume Tubau

8 August 2013
19:30

Russia	0–2	Brazil
	Report	R. Almeida 14'; L. Silva 60'

ZEM Jaume Tubau

== Finals ==
Position 15-16

9 August 2013
9:30

Japan	1–7	Spain
Ura 28'	Report	Clemente 35', 49'; Ribeiro 42', 44', 59'; Pacheco 53'; Rodriguez 59'

ZEM Jaume Tubau

Position 13-14

9 August 2013
11:30

Venezuela	0–1	Australia
	Report	Pyne 45'

ZEM Jaume Tubau

Position 11-12

9 August 2013
17:30

Portugal	1–2	Northern Ireland
Ramos 44'	Report	Walker 12'; Halpin 57'

ZEM Jaume Tubau

Position 9-10

9 August 2013
19:30

Canada	0–1	England
	Report	Smith 26'

ZEM Jaume Tubau

Position 7-8

10 August 2013
9:30

United States	3–4	Scotland
Renteria 22'; Vazquez 28'; McKinney 57'	Report	Glynn 1'; Hickman 6'; Paterson 10'; Brown 56'

ZEM Jaume Tubau

Position 5-6

10 August 2013
11:30

Netherlands	2–1	Argentina
Conijn; Rondenburg 53'	Report	Matias Fernandez 12'

ZEM Jaume Tubau

Position 3-4

10 August 2013
17:30

(Republic of Ireland) Ireland	0–4	Russia
	Report	Chesmin 11'; Albegov 42', 48'; Murvanadze 49'

ZEM Jaume Tubau

Final

10 August 2013
19:30

Ukraine	1–0	Brazil
Romanchuk 46'	Report

ZEM Jaume Tubau

== Statistics ==
=== Goalscorers ===
9 goals

- (Ukraine) Oleksandr Devlysh

8 goals

- (Scotland) Jonathan Paterson

7 goals

- (Canada) Matthew Brown
- (Argentina) Mariano Andrés Morana

6 goals

- (Brazil) Ronaldo de Souza Almeida
- (England) Michael Barker
- (Ukraine) Vitalii Romanchuk
- (England) Jack Rutter

5 goals

- (Netherlands) Gerad Arends
- (Russia) Alexey Chesmin
- (Netherlands) Lars Conijn
- (United States) Rene Renteria
- (Republic of Ireland) Dillon Sheridan
- (Ukraine) Ivan Shkvarlo
- (Brazil) Wanderson Silva de Oliveira
- (Netherlands) Iljas Visker

4 goals

- (Ukraine) Taras Dutko
- (Brazil) Jan Francisco Costa
- (Russia) Aleksandr Kuligin
- (Argentina) Rodrigo Eloy Lugrín
- (Argentina) Rodrigo Adolfo Luquez
- (Argentina) Matias Fernandez
- (Portugal) André Ricardo Silva Ferreira
- (Russia) Zaurbek Pegaev
- (Russia) Eduard Ramonov
- (Portugal) Tiago Ramos
- (Brazil) Luciano Silva
- (England) Ryan Walker

3 goals

- (Russia) Georgiy Albegov
- (Ukraine) Volodymyr Antonyuk
- (Northern Ireland) Cormac Birt
- (Brazil) Marcos Yuri Costa
- (Russia) Mamuka Dzimistarishvili
- (Scotland) Martin Hickman
- (Netherlands) Peter Kooij
- (Netherlands) Stephan Lokhoff
- (United States) Josh McKinney
- (Ukraine) Denys Ponomaryov
- (Spain) Emilio Ribeiro
- (Portugal) Pedro Santos
- (England) Thomas Smith
- (Brazil) Evandro Souza
- (Canada) Stiles Trevor
- (Brazil) Fernandes Vieira

2 goals

- (Canada) Jamie Ackinclose
- (Brazil) Joao Batista Araújo
- (Spain) Sergio Clemente
- (England) Nicholas Fish
- (Scotland) Blair Glynn
- (Argentina) Ezequiel Anival Jaime
- (Northern Ireland) David Leavy
- (Republic of Ireland) Gary Messet
- (Russia) Lasha Murvanadze
- (Portugal) Ruben Oliveira
- (Spain) Raúl Pacheco
- (Scotland) Mark Robertson
- (Netherlands) Rik Rondenburg
- (England) Emyle Rudder
- (Brazil) Antonio Silva
- (Republic of Ireland) Daragh Snell
- (Ukraine) Vitaliy Trushev
- (Russia) Aleksey Tumakov
- (United States) Marthell Vazquez

1 goal

- (Netherlands) Chris Ahrens
- (Argentina) Juan Albert Alabarce
- (Argentina) Fabricio Gabriel Alvarez
- (England) Harry Baker
- (Australia) David Barber
- (United States) Tyler Bennett
- (Portugal) Nuno Bogas
- (Republic of Ireland) Daragh Byrne
- (Portugal) Tiago Carneiro
- (Canada) Samuel Charron
- (Argentina) Fabio Miguel Coria
- (Netherlands) Minne de Vos
- (Netherlands) Daan Dikken
- (Republic of Ireland) Luke Evans
- (Brazil) Marcos Ferreira
- (Northern Ireland) Stephen Halpin
- (Canada) Dustin Hodgson
- (Northern Ireland) Jordan Kearns
- (Australia) Ryan Kinner
- (Russia) Viacheslav Larionov
- (Australia) Connor Marsh
- (Scotland) Jaime Mitchell
- (Ukraine) Dmytro Molodtsov
- (Venezuela) Brayan Andrés Moreno
- (England) Alexander Mullin
- (Republic of Ireland) Ryan Nolan
- (England) Oliver Nugent
- (Brazil) Cleiton Oliveira
- (Spain) Jorge Peleteiro
- (Australia) Chris Pyne
- (Spain) Carlos Rodriguez
- (England) Martin Sinclair
- (Canada) Liam Stanley
- (Japan) Taisei Taniguchi
- (Venezuela) Saul Eliecer Torres
- (England) Karl Townshend
- (Japan) Tatsuhiro Ura
- (Portugal) Vitor Vilarinho
- (Ukraine) Yevhen Zinoviev

own goals

- (Spain) Chris Duehrsen

=== Ranking ===
Rank	Team
Gold medal	Ukraine
Silver medal	Brazil
Bronze medal	Russia
4.	(Republic of Ireland) Ireland
5.	Netherlands
6.	Argentina
7.	Scotland
8.	United States
9.	England
10.	Canada
11.	Northern Ireland
12.	Portugal
13.	Australia
14.	Venezuela
15.	Spain
16.	Japan
