= 2018 IFCPF CP Football European Championships =

Tournament details
- Host country: Netherlands
- Dates: 25 July – 5 August 2018
- Teams: 10
- Venue(s): 1 (in 1 host city)

Final positions
- Champions: Russia
- Runners-up: Ukraine
- Third place: (Republic of Ireland) Ireland
- Fourth place: Netherlands

Tournament statistics
- Matches played: 30
- Goals scored: 146 (4.87 per match)
- Top scorer(s): (Ukraine) Vitalii Romanchuk (7) (Republic of Ireland) Dillon Sheridan (7) (England) Harry Baker (7)

The 2018 IFCPF CP Football World Championships was the European championship for men's national 7-a-side association football teams. IFCPF stands for International Federation of Cerebral Palsy Football. Athletes compete with a physical disability. The Championship took place in the Netherlands from 25 July to 5 August 2018.

Football 7-a-side was played with modified FIFA rules. Among the modifications were that there were seven players, no offside, a smaller playing field, and permission for one-handed throw-ins. Matches consisted of two thirty-minute halves, with a fifteen-minute half-time break. The Championships was a qualifying event for the 2019 IFCPF CP Football World Championships.

== Participating teams and officials ==
=== Teams ===
Continental	Berths	Team
Host nation	1	Netherlands
Europe	9	Denmark; England; Finland; Germany (Republic of Ireland) Ireland; Northern Ireland; ~~Portugal~~; Russia; ~~Scotland~~; Spain; Ukraine
Total	10	

=== The draw ===
During the draw, the teams were divided into pots because of rankings. Here, the following groups:

	Group A	Group B
Pot 1	Netherlands (2.)	Ukraine (1.)
Pot 2	(Republic of Ireland) Ireland (4.)	England (3.)
Pot 3	Northern Ireland (7.)	Russia (5.)
Pot 4	Finland (10.)	Denmark (9.)
Pot 5	Germany (11.)	Spain (12.)
The teams outside Europe were not included. Scotland (8.) and Portugal (6.) did not participate this time.

=== Squads ===
Group A

Netherlands	(Republic of Ireland) Ireland	Northern Ireland	Denmark	Germany
1 Stefan Boersma; 2 Roy Flier; 3 Jeroen Schuitert; 4 Harm Panneman; 5 Martijn Loeffen; 6 Gerard Bambacht; 7 Jeroen Saedt; 8 Tom van Reusel; 10 Daan Dikken; 11 Rik Rodenburg; 14 Jochem Kintz; 15 Joey Mense; 21 Minne de Vos; 23 George van Altena	1 Mark Barry; 2 Joseph Markey; 3 Darragh Byrne; 4 Luke Evans; 5 Aaron Tier; 6 Oisin Merritt; 7 Gary Messett; 8 James Naughton; 9 Ryan Nolan; 10 Dillon Sheridan; 11 Peter Cotter; 12 Sam Carroll; 13 Darragh Snell; 14 Darragh Ruane	2 Charlie Fogarty; 4 Jordan Walker; 5 Lewis Hutin; 6 Timmy McClean; 7 Matthew Gildea; 8 Sean Coyle; 9 Ryan Walker; 10 Charley Emerson; 11 Ryan Neill; 12 Christian Canning; 14 Shea Tighe; 15 Paul Cassidy	1 Mads Christian Fomsgaard; 2 Anders Christiansen; 3 Erik Dreier Olsen; 4 Oliver Larsen; 5 Oliver Palmus; 6 William Kalum; 7 Glenn Sambleben; 8 Christian S. Moller Kjeldsen; 9 Kristoffer Nielsen; 10 Emil Moller; 11 Martin Wolf; 13 Mads Bendtsen; 14 Magnus Hytholm Strand; 15 Mads Tofte	David Bruns; Christian Eidenhardt; Luca Pascal Podensek; Frederic Heinze; Gordon Litinski; Jorn Henrik Lorenzen; Jonas Malkmus; Robin Meyer; Lars Nehrenheim; Pascal Odrich; Daniel Sperl; Mario Wawrik; Marco Geisler; Julius Kopf

Group B

Ukraine	England	Russia	Finland	Spain
1 Kostyantyn Symashko; 2 Vitaliy Trushev; 3 Hlib Husiev; 4 Taras Dutko; 5 Oleh Len; 6 Edhar Kahramanian; 7 Vitalii Romanchuk; 8 Artem Sheremet; 9 Dmytro Molodtsov; 10 Ivan Donenko; 11 Serhii Bedenok; 12 Bohdan Kulynych; 13 Artem Krasylnykov; 14 Ivan Shkvarlo	1 Giles Moore; 2 Liam Irons; 3 Harry Baker; 4 James Blackwell; 5 Martin Sinclair; 6 Matt Crossen; 7 Michael Barker; 8 Dale Smith; 9 George Fletcher; 10 Jordan Twiss; 11 Oliver Nugent; 12 Jack Fox; 13 Ryan Kay; 14 Lewis Tribe	1 Vladislav Raretckii; 2 Leonid Ilyichov; 3 Aslan Tibilov; 4 Andrey Shimanov; 5 Viacheslav Larionov; 6 Sergei Materukhin; 7 Soslan Gazdanov; 8 Dmirti Minenko; 9 Marat Eloev; 10 Alexei Borkin; 11 Roman Pesotskiy; 12 Guram Chkareuli; 13 Danila Belov; 14 Georgiy Albegov	1 Jaakko Seppala; 3 Jussi Laurila; 4 Simo Mykkänen; 5 Bulcsu Szekely; 7 Jussi Tuominen; 8 Mikael Jukarainen; 9 Janne Helander; 10 Johannes Siikonen; 11 Kim Karlsson; 12 Otto Kaipainen; 15 Samuel Taipale; 18 Antti Hovi; 20 Ville Kuronen	1 Antonio Jesus Dominguez; 2 Pol Aguilar; 3 Noé Adell; 4 Santiago Maciá; 5 Isaías Pacheco; 6 Jaume Almenar; 7 Mario Fernández; 8 Sergio Nicolas Clemente; 9 Jose Manuel Bueno; 10 Eduardo Jose de Laorden; 11 Dego Barreto; 12 Daniel Zancajo; 13 Francisco José Martín; 14 Carlos Rodriguez

== Venues ==
The venues to be used for the World Championships were located in Zeist.

Zeist KNVB Campus	2018 IFCPF CP Football European Championships is located in Netherlands
Stadium: unknown	2018 IFCPF CP Football European Championships is located in Netherlands
Capacity: unknown	2018 IFCPF CP Football European Championships is located in Netherlands

== Format ==
The first round, or group stage, was a competition between the 10 teams divided among two groups of five, where each group engaged in a round-robin tournament within itself. The two highest ranked teams in each group advanced to the knockout stage for the position one to four. The next two teams played for the position five to eight. The last teams played for the position nine to ten. Teams were awarded three points for a win and one for a draw. When comparing teams in a group over-all result came before head-to-head.

Tie-breaking criteria for group play
The ranking of teams in each group was based on the following criteria:
1. Number of points
2. Goal difference
3. Number of goals scored
4. Number of points obtained in matches between tied teams
5. Goal difference in matches between tied teams
6. Number of goals scored in matches between tied teams
7. Drawing of lots

In the knockout stage there were three rounds (quarter-finals, semi-finals, and the final). The winners plays for the higher positions, the losers for the lower positions. For any match in the knockout stage, a draw after 60 minutes of regulation time was followed by two 10 minute periods of extra time to determine a winner. If the teams were still tied, a penalty shoot-out was held to determine a winner.

Classification
Athletes with a physical disability competed. The athlete's disability was caused by a non-progressive brain damage that affects motor control, such as cerebral palsy, traumatic brain injury or stroke. Athletes must be ambulant.

Players were classified by level of disability.

- C5: Athletes with difficulties when walking and running, but not in standing or when kicking the ball.
- C6: Athletes with control and co-ordination problems of their upper limbs, especially when running.
- C7: Athletes with hemiplegia.
- C8: Athletes with minimal disability; must meet eligibility criteria and have an impairment that has impact on the sport of football.

Teams must field at least one class C5 or C6 player at all times. No more than two players of class C8 are permitted to play at the same time.

== Group stage ==
The first round, or group stage, have seen the sixteen teams divided into four groups of four teams.

=== Group A ===
Pos	Team	Pld	W	D	L	GF	GA	GD	Pts	Qualified for
1	(Republic of Ireland) Ireland	4	4	0	0	18	1	+17	12	Team play for the position 1 - 4
2	Netherlands	4	3	0	1	18	3	+15	9	Team play for the position 1 - 4
3	Germany	4	2	0	2	9	10	−1	6	Team play for the position 5 - 8
4	Northern Ireland	4	1	0	3	2	13	−11	3	Team play for the position 5 - 8
5	Denmark	4	0	0	4	0	20	−20	0	Team play for the position 9 - 10

Rules for classification: Tie-breaking criteria
25 July 2018
16:00

Ireland (Republic of Ireland)	8–0	Denmark
Sheridan 10', 19', 23', 27'; Messett 12'; Nolan 53'; Evans 55'; Ruane 57'	Report

25 July 2018
19:00

Netherlands	4–2	Germany
Panneman 11'; Schuitert 28' (pen.); Rodenburg 47'; Saedt 56'	Report	Eidenhardt 34'; Odrich 58' (pen.)

27 July 2018
16:00

Northern Ireland	1–2	Germany
Emerson 31'	Report	Meyer 9'; Sperl 27'

27 July 2018
19:00

Netherlands	7–0	Denmark
Saedt 5'; Christiansen 10' (o.g.); Schuitert 13', 56'; Dikken 42'; Flier 52'; Bambacht 56'	Report

29 July 2018
12:00

Ireland (Republic of Ireland)	5–1	Germany
Sheridan 5', 31'; Merritt 22', 43'; Messett 24'	Report	Sperl 2'

29 July 2018
16:00

Netherlands	7–0	Northern Ireland
Schuitert 1', 19'; Vos 7'; Rodenburg 10', 23'; Saedt 44'; Loeffen 60'	Report

30 July 2018
16:00

Denmark	0–4	Germany
	Report	Lorenzen 1', 19'; Eidenhardt 49'; Odrich 53'

30 July 2018
19:00

Ireland (Republic of Ireland)	4–0	Northern Ireland
Messett 9', 39'; Nolan 32'; Ruane 58'	Report

1 August 2018
10:00

Northern Ireland	1–0	Denmark
Emerson 38'	Report

1 August 2018
19:00

Netherlands	0–1	(Republic of Ireland) Ireland
	Report	Sheridan 41'

=== Group B ===
Pos	Team	Pld	W	D	L	GF	GA	GD	Pts	Qualified for
1	Russia	4	4	0	0	11	1	+10	12	Team play for the position 1 - 4
2	Ukraine	4	3	0	1	18	1	+17	9	Team play for the position 1 - 4
3	England	4	1	0	3	19	4	+15	3	Team play for the position 5 - 8
4	Spain	4	1	0	3	4	22	−18	3	Team play for the position 5 - 8
5	Finland	4	0	0	4	1	25	−24	0	Team play for the position 9 - 10

Rules for classification: Tie-breaking criteria
25 July 2018
10:00

Russia	5–0	Spain
Gazdanov 8'; Tibilov 16'; Albegov 30'; Ilyichov 38'; Shimanov 43'	Report

25 July 2018
12:00

Ukraine	8–0	Finland
Shkvarlo 9', 15'; Sheremet 14'; Romanchuk 31', 35'; Donenko 44', 46'; Krasylnykov 57'	Report

26 July 2018
12:00

England	10–0	Finland
Crossen 4', 6', 25'; Fletcher 10', 27'; Baker 11', 16'; Mykkänen 13' (o.g.); Twiss 16'; Tribe 36'	Report

26 July 2018
16:00

Ukraine	8–0	Spain
Romanchuk 14', 54'; Shkvarlo 19'; Krasylnykov 41', 60+2'; Len 53'; Donenko 56', 58'	Report

28 July 2018
12:00

England	0–1	Russia
	Report	Larionov 30'

28 July 2018
16:00

Finland	0–3	Spain
	Report	Almenar 28'; Fernández 30'; Maciá 39'

30 July 2018
10:00

England	9–1	Spain
Smith 4', 9'; Crossen 19', 48'; Baker 22'; Irons 27', 29'; Twiss 27'; Fletcher 42'	Report	Crossen 35' (o.g.)

30 July 2018
12:00

Ukraine	0–1	Russia
	Report	Borkin 11'

1 August 2018
12:00

Russia	4–1	Finland
Eloev 3'; Pesotskiy 5'; Ilyichov 25' (pen.); Gazdanov 53'	Report	Hovi 35'

1 August 2018
16:00

Ukraine	2–0	England
Sheremet 3'; Romanchuk 56'	Report

== Knockout stage ==
=== Semi-finals ===
Position 5-8

3 August 2018
12:00

Germany	3–2	Spain
Eidenhardt 13'; Sperl 19'; Malkmus 44'	Report	Maciá 9'; Lorenzen 39' (o.g.)

3 August 2018
10:00

England	8–0	Northern Ireland
Irons 3'; Crossen 13'; Baker 28', 30', 34'; Smith 41'; Tribe 43'; Twiss 48'	Report

Position 1-4

3 August 2018
16:00

Ireland (Republic of Ireland)	0–3	Ukraine
	Report	Romanchuk 24', 37'; Donenko 60+3'

3 August 2018
19:00

Russia	5–0	Netherlands
Borkin 13'; Eloev 21', 26'; Albegov 51'; Gazdanov 53'	Report

== Finals ==
Position 9-10

2 August 2018
12:00

Denmark	3–1	Finland
Kalum 20'; Christiansen 22'; Jukarainen 44' (o.g.)	Report	Jukarainen 57'

4 August 2018
12:00

Finland	0–8	Denmark
	Report	Olsen 9', 31'; Christiansen 23'; Jukarainen 36' (o.g.); Strand 42', 53'; Sambleben 58'; Larsen 60'

Position 7-8

5 August 2018
10:00

Northern Ireland	1–2	Spain
Emerson 60+1'	Report	Maciá 33', 54'

Position 5-6

5 August 2018
12:00

England	2–0	Germany
Baker 32'; Smith 49'	Report

Position 3-4

5 August 2018
14:30

Ireland (Republic of Ireland)	2–1	Netherlands
Tier 52'; Dikken 57' (o.g.)	Report	Vos 60+4'

Final

5 August 2018
17:00

Ukraine	2–3	Russia
Dutko 25'; Bedenok 31'	Report	Borkin 23' (pen.), 30', 60+2' (pen.)

== Statistics ==
=== Goalscorers ===
7 goals

- (Ukraine) Vitalii Romanchuk
- (Republic of Ireland) Dillon Sheridan
- (England) Harry Baker

6 goals

- (England) Matt Crossen

5 goals

- (Russia) Alexei Borkin
- (Ukraine) Ivan Donenko
- (Netherlands) Jeroen Schuitert

4 goals

- (England) Liam Irons
- (Spain) Santiago Maciá
- (Republic of Ireland) Gary Messett
- (England) Dale Smith

3 goals

- (Germany) Christian Eidenhardt
- (Russia) Marat Eloev
- (Northern Ireland) Charley Emerson
- (Russia) Soslan Gazdanov
- (Ukraine) Artem Krasylnykov
- (Republic of Ireland) Ryan Nolan
- (Netherlands) Rik Rodenburg
- (Netherlands) Jeroen Saedt
- (Ukraine) Ivan Shkvarlo
- (Germany) Daniel Sperl
- (England) Jordan Twiss

2 goals

- (Russia) Georgiy Albegov
- (Denmark) Anders Christiansen
- (Russia) Leonid Ilyichov
- (Germany) Jorn Henrik Lorenzen
- (Republic of Ireland) Oisin Merritt
- (Germany) Pascal Odrich
- (Denmark) Erik Dreier Olsen
- (Republic of Ireland) Darragh Ruane
- (Ukraine) Artem Sheremet
- (Russia) Andrey Shimanov
- (Denmark) Magnus Hytholm Strand
- (Republic of Ireland) Aaron Tier
- (England) Lewis Tribe
- (Netherlands) Minne de Vos

1 goal

- (Spain) Jaume Almenar
- (Netherlands) Gerard Bambacht
- (Ukraine) Serhii Bedenok
- (Netherlands) Daan Dikken
- (Ukraine) Taras Dutko
- (Republic of Ireland) Luke Evans
- (Spain) Mario Fernández
- (England) George Fletcher
- (Netherlands) Roy Flier
- (Finland) Mikael Jukarainen
- (Denmark) William Kalum
- (Russia) Viacheslav Larionov
- (Denmark) Oliver Larsen
- (Ukraine) Oleh Len
- (Netherlands) Martijn Loeffen
- (Germany) Jonas Malkmus
- (Germany) Robin Meyer
- (Netherlands) Harm Panneman
- (Russia) Roman Pesotskiy
- (Denmark) Glenn Sambleben
- (Russia) Aslan Tibilov

own goals

- 2× (Finland) Mikael Jukarainen
- (Denmark) Anders Christiansen
- (England) Matt Crossen
- (Netherlands) Daan Dikken
- (Germany) Jorn Henrik Lorenzen
- (Finland) Simo Mykkänen

=== Ranking ===
Rank	Team
Gold medal	Russia
Silver medal	Ukraine
Bronze medal	(Republic of Ireland) Ireland
4.	Netherlands
5.	England
6.	Germany
7.	Spain
8.	Northern Ireland
9.	Finland
10.	Denmark
