= 2014 CPISRA Football 7-a-side European Championships =

Tournament details
- Host country: Portugal
- Dates: 23 July – 2 August 2014
- Teams: 11
- Venue: 2 (in 1 host city)

Final positions
- Champions: Ukraine (5th title)
- Runners-up: Netherlands
- Third place: Russia
- Fourth place: Iran

Tournament statistics
- Matches played: 29
- Goals scored: 162 (5.59 per match)
- Top scorer: (Netherlands) Iljas Visker (8)

The 2014 CPISRA Football 7-a-side European Championships was the European championship for men's national 7-a-side association football teams. CPISRA stands for Cerebral Palsy International Sports & Recreation Association. Athletes with a physical disability competed. The Championship took place in Portugal from 23 July to 2 August 2014.

Football 7-a-side was played with modified FIFA rules. Among the modifications were that there were seven players, no offside, a smaller playing field, and permission for one-handed throw-ins. Matches consisted of two thirty-minute halves, with a fifteen-minute half-time break. The Championships was a qualifying event for the 2015 IFCPF CP Football World Championships.

== Participating teams and officials ==
=== Teams ===
Means of qualification	Berths	Qualified
Host nation	1	Portugal
European Region	10	Denmark; England; Finland; Germany (Republic of Ireland) Ireland; Netherlands; Northern Ireland; Russia; Scotland; ~~Spain~~; Ukraine
Total	11	

=== The draw ===
During the draw, the teams were divided into pots because of rankings. Here, the following groups:

	Group A	Group B	Group C
Pot 1	Netherlands (3.)	Russia (1.)	Ukraine (2.)
Pot 2	(Republic of Ireland) Ireland (4.)	Scotland (8.)	England (10.)
Pot 3	Finland (.)	Northern Ireland (15.)	Portugal (.)
Pot 4	Denmark (21.)	Germany (23.)	
The teams outside Europe were not included. Spain (.) did not participate this time.

=== Squads ===
Group A

Netherlands	(Republic of Ireland) Ireland	Finland	Denmark
1 George Van Altena (GK); 2 Anton Saedt; 3 Mitch Lebon; 4 Myron Gebbink; 5 Teddy Witjes; 6 Peter Kooij; 7 Minne De Vos; 8 Lars Conijn; 10 Stephan Lokhoff (c); 14 Daan Dikken; 15 Joey Mense; 17 Hendrik Rodenburg; 23 Stefan Boersma (GK)	1 Simon L’ Estrange (GK); 2 Darragh Byrne; 3 Joseph Markey; 4 Luke Evans; 5 Podge (Paraic) Leacy; 6 Dillon Sheridan; 7 Gary Messett (c); 8 Ryan Nolan; 9 Tomiwa Badun; 10 Eric O'Flaherty; 11 Peter Cotter; 12 Aaron Tier; 13 Carl Mc Kee; 14 Brian Mc Gillivary (GK)	1 Jaakko Seppälä (GK); 3 Jussi Wiljami Laurila; 7 Jussi Tuominen; 8 Mikael Jukarainen; 9 Janne Helander; 10 Johannes C Siikonen (c); 13 Tomi Petteri Heikkilä; 12 Otto Kaipainen; 14 Pyry Nopsanen; 15 Samuel Taipale; 16 Joni Berg; 20 Ville Kuronen	1 Mads Tofte (GK); 2 Mikkel Munkholm; 3 Rasmus Jørgensen; 5 Per Mørch; 6 Peter Hansen (c); 7 Glenn Sambleben; 8 Victor Sørensen; 9 Claus Pape; 10 Noa Bak-Pedersen; 11/18 Aleksander Pedersen (GK)/(MF); 16 Andreas Simonsen; 83 Emil Møller
Coach: Marcel Geestman	Coach: Gerard Glynn	Coach: Samuel Siikonen	Coach: Henrik Voerby

Group B

Russia	Scotland	Northern Ireland	Germany
3 Aslanbek Sapiev; 6 Aleksey Tumakov; 7 Alexey Chesmin; 8 Ivan Potekhin; 9 Eduard Ramonov; 10 Dmitrii Pestritsov; 11 Dmitrii Kukovkin; 12 Guram Chkareuli; 13 Lasha Murvanadze; 14 Georgiy Albegov; 15 Viacheslav Larionov; 16 Vladislav Raretskiy; 17 Zaurbek Pagaev; 18 Aleksandr Kuligin	1 Craig Connell (GK); 2 Blair Glynn; 3 Martin Hickman; 4 Scott Troup (GK); 5 Lewis McIntyre; 6 Declan Docherty; 7 Mark Robertson; 8 Jamie Mitchell; 9 Laurie McGinley; 10 Jonathan Paterson (c); 11 Thomas Brown; 12 Scott Martin; 13 Barry Halloran; 14 Duncan Macpherson	1 Gareth Miller (GK); 2 Christian Canning (c); 3 Jordan Cush; 4/17 Paul Cassidy (MF)/(GK); 5 Cormac Birt; 6 William Hamilton; 7 Stephen Halpin; 8 David Levy; 9 Ryan Walker; 10 Jordan Walker; 11 James Holden	2 Jan Jeschke; 3 Christian Jonas Becht; 4 Fabian Ollesch; 5 Kevin Wermeester (c); 6 Frederic Heinze; 7 Gordon Litinski; 8 Sener Oguz; 9 Philipp Freudinger; 10 Benjamin Weiss; 11 Tim Lescigewsky; 12 Renè Heinen (GK); 13 Maik Puschmann; 14 Conny Fritsch; 15 William Pushpinder
Coach: Avtandil Baramidze	Coach: Andrew Smith	Coach: Mal Donaghy	Coach: Thomas Pfannkuch

Group C

Ukraine	England	Portugal
1 Kostyantyn Symashko; 2 Vitaliy Trushev; 3 Yevhen Zinoviev; 4 Taras Dutko (c); 5 Anatolii Shevchyk; 6 Edhar Kahramanian; 7 Ivan Shkvarlo; 8 Denys Ponomarov; 9 Dmytro Molodtsov; 10 Oleksandr Devlysh; 11 Volodymyr Antonyuk; 12 Bohdan Kulynych (GK); 13 Vitalii Romanchuk; 14 Dmytro Hetman	1 Giles Moore (GK); 2 Harry Baker; 3 Karl Townshend; 4 Richard Fox; 5 Jack Rutter (c); 6 Martin Sinclair; 7 Michael Barker; 8 James Blackwell; 9 George Fletcher; 11 Oliver Nugent; 12 Jake Brown; 13 Jordan Raynes (GK); 14 Alexander Mullin	1 Rui Rocha (GK); 2 Ricardo França; 3 Ricardo Sotto Mayor; 4 Vasco Santos; 5 Ruben Oliveira; 6 Luis Ferreira; 7 Vítor Vilarinho (c); 8 Pedro Santos; 9 Tiago Carneiro; 10 Tiago Ramos; 11 André Ferreira; 12 Sérgio Barros; 13 Lucas Pinheiro; 14 Telmo Baptista (GK)
Coach: Ovcharenko Serhii	Coach: Keith Webb	Coach: Luis Ferreira

== Venues ==
The venues to be used for the European Championships were located in Maia.

Maia		2014 CPISRA Football 7-a-side European Championships is located in Portugal
Estádio Municipal; Dr. Costa Lima	Estádio Municipal; Dr. José Vieira de Carvalho	2014 CPISRA Football 7-a-side European Championships is located in Portugal
Capacity: 2,000	Capacity: 16,000	2014 CPISRA Football 7-a-side European Championships is located in Portugal

== Format ==
The first round, or group stage, was a competition between the 11 teams divided among two groups of four and one group of three, where each group engaged in a round-robin tournament within itself. The two highest ranked teams in each group and the best two third-placed of the groups advanced to the knockout stage for the position one to eight. The other teams played for the positions nine to eleven. The Teams were awarded three points for a win and one for a draw. When comparing teams in a group over-all result came before head-to-head.

Tie-breaking criteria for group play
The ranking of teams in each group was based on the following criteria:
1. Number of points
2. Goal difference
3. Number of goals scored
4. Number of points obtained in matches between tied teams
5. Goal difference in matches between tied teams
6. Number of goals scored in matches between tied teams
7. Drawing of lots

In the knockout stage there were three rounds (quarter-finals, semi-finals, and the final). The winners plays for the higher positions, the losers for the lower positions. For any match in the knockout stage, a draw after 60 minutes of regulation time was followed by two 10 minute periods of extra time to determine a winner. If the teams were still tied, a penalty shoot-out was held to determine a winner.

Classification
Athletes with a physical disability competed. The athlete's disability was caused by a non-progressive brain damage that affects motor control, such as cerebral palsy, traumatic brain injury or stroke. Athletes must be ambulant.

Players were classified by level of disability.

- C5: Athletes with difficulties when walking and running, but not in standing or when kicking the ball.
- C6: Athletes with control and co-ordination problems of their upper limbs, especially when running.
- C7: Athletes with hemiplegia.
- C8: Athletes with minimal disability; must meet eligibility criteria and have an impairment that has impact on the sport of football.

Teams must field at least one class C5 or C6 player at all times. No more than two players of class C8 are permitted to play at the same time.

== Group stage ==
The first round, or group stage, have seen the sixteen teams divided into four groups of four teams.

=== Group A ===
Pos	Team	Pld	W	D	L	GF	GA	GD	Pts	Qualified for
1	(Republic of Ireland) Ireland	3	3	0	0	21	0	+21	9	Team play for the position 1 - 8
2	Netherlands	3	2	0	1	20	1	+19	6	Team play for the position 1 - 8
3	Denmark	3	1	0	2	2	21	−19	3	2 best 3 placed to qualify for the quarter final
4	Finland	3	0	0	3	1	22	−21	0	Team play for the position 9 - 16

Source: Euro Football 7-a-side - Maia 2014 *In all competitions a maximum number of 10 goals scored will be allowed to be counted.
Rules for classification: Tie-breaking criteria
24 July 2014
10:00

Netherlands	14–0*	Denmark
Visker 2', 5', 11', 13', 17', 26', 27'; Dikken 16'; Lokhoff 16'; Kooij 33', 35'; Saedt 36', 54', 60'	Report

Estádio Municipal Dr. Costa Lima
24 July 2014
12:00

(Republic of Ireland) Ireland	10–0	Finland
Nolan 13'; Tier 23'; Cotter 32'; Sheridan 37', 54', 56'; Messett 39'; Leacy 43', 46'; Markey 50'	Report

Estádio Municipal Dr. Costa Lima
25 July 2014
10:00

Finland	0–14*	Netherlands
	Report	Kooij 1', 23', 25'; Conijn 4', 8', 36'; Lokhoff 29'; Lebon 32', 33', 44'; Rodenburg 39', 41'; Mense 54'; Gebbink 55'

Estádio Municipal Dr. José Vieira de Carvalho
25 July 2014
12:00

Denmark	0–12*	(Republic of Ireland) Ireland
	Report	Evans 1', 13', 26'; O'Flaherty 4', 20'; Byrne 6'; Badun 42', 45', 55'; Messett 33', 36'; Leacy 50'

Estádio Municipal Dr. José Vieira de Carvalho
27 July 2014
16:00

Netherlands	0–1	(Republic of Ireland) Ireland
	Report	Byrne 55'

Estádio Municipal Dr. José Vieira de Carvalho
27 July 2014
16:00

Finland	1–2	Denmark
Jukarainen 20'	Report	Sambleben 3'; Hansen 8'

Estádio Municipal Dr. Costa Lima

=== Group B ===
Pos	Team	Pld	W	D	L	GF	GA	GD	Pts	Qualified for
1	Russia	3	3	0	0	9	0	+9	9	Team play for the position 1 - 8
2	Scotland	3	2	0	1	10	4	+6	6	Team play for the position 1 - 8
3	Northern Ireland	3	1	0	2	2	5	−3	3	2 best 3 placed to qualify for the quarter final
4	Germany	3	0	0	3	0	12	−12	0	Team play for the position 9 - 16

Source: Euro Football 7-a-side - Maia 2014
Rules for classification: Tie-breaking criteria
24 July 2014
16:00

Russia	4–0	Germany
Murvanadze 2'; Kuligin 11'; Chesmin 23', 47'	Report

Estádio Municipal Dr. Costa Lima
24 July 2014
18:00

Scotland	3–1	Northern Ireland
Hickman 38'; Robertson 48'; McGinley 56'	Report	Levy 26'

Estádio Municipal Dr. Costa Lima
25 July 2014
16:00

Northern Ireland	0–2	Russia
	Report	Pestritsov 7'; Ramonov 9'

Estádio Municipal Dr. José Vieira de Carvalho
25 July 2014
18:00

Germany	0–7	Scotland
	Report	Brown 2'; McGinley 25'; J. Paterson 26', 29'; Halloran 33'; Glynn 49'; Mitchell 59'

Estádio Municipal Dr. José Vieira de Carvalho
27 July 2014
18:00

Russia	3–0	Scotland
Murvanadze 12'; Ramonov 25', 39'	Report

Estádio Municipal Dr. José Vieira de Carvalho
27 July 2014
18:00

Northern Ireland	1–0	Germany
R. Walker 37'	Report

Estádio Municipal Dr. Costa Lima

=== Group C ===
Pos	Team	Pld	W	D	L	GF	GA	GD	Pts	Qualified for
1	Ukraine	2	1	1	0	7	2	+5	4	Team play for the position 1 - 8
2	England	2	1	1	0	6	1	+5	4	Team play for the position 1 - 8
3	Portugal	2	0	0	2	1	11	−10	0	2 best 3 placed to qualify for the quarter final

Source: Euro Football 7-a-side - Maia 2014
Rules for classification: Tie-breaking criteria
23 July 2014
20:00

Portugal	0–5	England
	Report	Barker 7', 22', 34'; Rutter 10', 29'

Estádio Municipal Dr. José Vieira de Carvalho
25 July 2014
20:00

Portugal	1–6	Ukraine
Vilarinho 44'	Report	Hetman 1'; Devlysh 3', 5'; Molodtsov 14'; Romanchuk 35'; Trushev 53'

Estádio Municipal Dr. José Vieira de Carvalho
26 July 2014
18:00

Ukraine	1–1	England
Devlysh 58'	Report	Rutter 57'

Estádio Municipal Dr. Costa Lima

Table of third-placed teams from each group
To compare the third-placed teams, only the games counted against the first-placed and second placed team, because in group C were only three teams. In this table, the two best teams rose to the quarter-finals, the third-placed nation must play the games at the 9th to 11th place.

Thus was laid on 25 July that the teams from Northern Ireland and Portugal were promoted to the quarter-finals, the team from Finland had to play for the 9th to 11th place.

Pos	Team	Pld	W	D	L	GF	GA	GD	Pts	Qualified for
1	Northern Ireland	2	0	0	2	1	5	−4	0	Team play for the position 1 - 8
2	Portugal	2	0	0	2	1	11	−10	0	Team play for the position 1 - 8
3	Finland	2	0	0	2	0	24	−24	0	Team play for the position 9 - 12

Source: Euro Football 7-a-side - Maia 2014
Rules for classification: Tie-breaking criteria

== Knockout stage ==
=== Quarter-finals ===
29 July 2014
9:00

(Republic of Ireland) Ireland	6–2	Portugal
Messett 11'; Badun 14', 19'; Sheridan 43'; Tier 58', 60+1'	Report	Ramos 23'; Carneiro 59'

Estádio Municipal Dr. José Vieira de Carvalho

29 July 2014
12:00

Russia	5–1	England
Chesmin 3'; Murvanadze 19'; Kuligin 27'; Larionov 29'; Ramonov 38'	Report	Fletcher 35'

Estádio Municipal Dr. José Vieira de Carvalho

29 July 2014
15:30

Ukraine	6–0	Northern Ireland
R. Walker 2' (o.g.); Levy 7' (o.g.); Ponomarov 21'; Romanchuk 21'; Molodtsov 30'; Antonyuk 60'	Report

Estádio Municipal Dr. José Vieira de Carvalho

29 July 2014
18:00

Netherlands	3–0	Scotland
Conijn 25'; Saedt 26'; Kooij 60+4'	Report

Estádio Municipal Dr. José Vieira de Carvalho

=== Semi-finals ===
Position 5-8

31 July 2014
9:00

Portugal	0–6	Scotland
	Report	Halloran 8', 47'; Hickman 15', 28'; McGinley 40'; J. Paterson 59'

Estádio Municipal Dr. Costa Lima

31 July 2014
12:00

England	7–1	Northern Ireland
Barker 8', 51'; Nugent 15'; Fletcher 16'; Brown 45'; Rutter 47'; Blackwell 58'	Report	R. Walker 50'

Estádio Municipal Dr. Costa Lima

Position 1-4

31 July 2014
15:30

(Republic of Ireland) Ireland	2–3 (a.e.t.)	Netherlands
Sheridan 48'; Messett 60'	Report	Lokhoff 16'; Conijn 23'; Visker 74'

Estádio Municipal Dr. Costa Lima

31 July 2014
18:00

Russia	0–0 (a.e.t.)	Ukraine
	Report
Penalties
	4–5

Estádio Municipal Dr. Costa Lima

== Finals ==
Position 9-11

28 July 2014
18:00

Finland	1–5	Germany
Helander 38'	Report	Fritsch 6', 20'; Wermeester 12', 17'; Freudinger 49'

Estádio Municipal Dr. Costa Lima

30 July 2014
18:00

Germany	4–1	Denmark
Fritsch 11'; Heinze 13'; Wermeester 19'; Freudinger 39'	Report	Møller 59'

Estádio Municipal Dr. José Vieira de Carvalho

1 August 2014
18:00

Denmark	6–0	Finland
Hansen 12'; Sørensen 18', 44', 45'; Simonsen 58'; Møller 59'	Report

Estádio Municipal Dr. Costa Lima

Position 7-8

2 August 2014
9:30

Portugal	2–2 (a.e.t.)	Northern Ireland
Vilarinho 24'; Ramos 60'	Report	R. Walker 1'; Levy 4'
Penalties
	3–2	Penalty scored Penalty missed

Position 5-6

2 August 2014
12:30

Scotland	^{1}	England
	Report

Estádio Municipal Dr. José Vieira de Carvalho

1 = Match was not played due to bad weather conditions

Position 3-4

2 August 2014
15:30

(Republic of Ireland) Ireland	0–3	Russia
	Report	Ramonov 5'; Kuligin 32', 40'

Estádio Municipal Dr. José Vieira de Carvalho

Final

2 August 2014
18:00

Netherlands	0–3	Ukraine
	Report	Antonyuk 9'; Zinoviev 16'; Romanchuk 57'

Estádio Municipal Dr. José Vieira de Carvalho

== Statistics ==
=== Goalscorers ===
8 goals

- (Netherlands) Iljas Visker

7 goals

- (Netherlands) Peter Kooij

5 goals

- (Republic of Ireland) Tomiwa Badun
- (England) Michael Barker
- (Russia) Eduard Ramonov
- (Republic of Ireland) Dillon Sheridan

4 goals

- (Netherlands) Lars Conijn
- (Republic of Ireland) Luke Evans
- (Scotland) Barry Halloran
- (Russia) Aleksandr Kuligin
- (Republic of Ireland) Gary Messett
- (England) Jack Rutter
- (Netherlands) Anton Saedt

3 goals

- (Russia) Alexey Chesmin
- (Ukraine) Oleksandr Devlysh
- (Germany) Conny Fritsch
- (Scotland) Martin Hickman
- (Netherlands) Mitch Lebon
- (Netherlands) Stephan Lokhoff
- (Scotland) Laurie McGinley
- (Denmark) Emil Møller
- (Russia) Lasha Murvanadze
- (Scotland) Jonathan Paterson
- (Ukraine) Vitalii Romanchuk
- (Denmark) Victor Sørensen
- (Republic of Ireland) Aaron Tier
- (Portugal) Vítor Vilarinho
- (Northern Ireland) Ryan Walker
- (Germany) Kevin Wermeester

2 goals

- (Ukraine) Volodymyr Antonyuk
- (Republic of Ireland) Darragh Byrne
- (Northern Ireland) David Levy
- (England) George Fletcher
- (Germany) Philipp Freudinger
- (Denmark) Peter Hansen
- (Republic of Ireland) Podge Leacy
- (Ukraine) Dmytro Molodtsov
- (Republic of Ireland) Eric O'Flaherty
- (Portugal) Tiago Ramos
- (Netherlands) Hendrik Rodenburg

1 goal

- (England) James Blackwell
- (Netherlands) Stefan Boersma
- (England) Jake Brown
- (Scotland) Thomas Brown
- (Northern Ireland) Christian Canning
- (Portugal) Tiago Carneiro
- (Republic of Ireland) Peter Cotter
- (Netherlands) Daan Dikken
- (Netherlands) Myron Gebbink
- (Scotland) Blair Glynn
- (Germany) Frederic Heinze
- (Finland) Janne Helander
- (Ukraine) Dmytro Hetman
- (Finland) Mikael Jukarainen
- (Russia) Viacheslav Larionov
- (Republic of Ireland) Joseph Markey
- (Netherlands) Joey Mense
- (Scotland) Jamie Mitchell
- (Republic of Ireland) Ryan Nolan
- (England) Oliver Nugent
- (Russia) Dmitrii Pestritsov
- (Ukraine) Denys Ponomarov
- (Scotland) Mark Robertson
- (Portugal) Rui Rocha
- (Denmark) Andreas Simonsen
- (Denmark) Glenn Sambleben
- (Ukraine) Vitaliy Trushev
- (Northern Ireland) Jordan Walker
- (Ukraine) Yevhen Zinoviev

own goals

- (Northern Ireland) David Levy
- (Northern Ireland) Ryan Walker

=== Ranking ===
Rank	Team
Gold medal	Ukraine
Silver medal	Netherlands
Bronze medal	Russia
4.	(Republic of Ireland) Ireland
5.	England
5.	Scotland
7.	Portugal
8.	Northern Ireland
9.	Germany
10.	Denmark
11.	Finland
