= Jake Brown (footballer) =

English television contestant and footballer

Personal information
- National team: England
- Born: c. 1996 Cumbria, England
- Occupations: Project manager, television personality
Association football career
- Positions: Midfielder; forward
Senior career*
Years	Team	Apps	(Gls)
2012–2023	Askam United	65+	(2+)
International career
2013–	England CP	8+	(5+)
2016	Great Britain CP		
- * Club domestic league appearances and goals

Sport
- Sport: Association football, CP football
- Disability class: CP7 (FT7)

Jake Brown (born c. 1996) is an English association football and CP football player, and television contestant. As a footballer, he has represented both England, including at the 2015 IFCPF CP Football World Championships where they recorded a best-ever fifth-place finish, and Great Britain. On television, he won the third series of reality game show The Traitors.

== Football ==
Though born with cerebral palsy, Brown had always insisted on participating in non-adjusted sports as a child, and this included playing football on teams with able-bodied peers. He began playing football at four years old, before being approached by a scout for the England national cerebral palsy football team in 2013; Brown initially had reservations, thinking the quality of such a squad would be low and not wanting to be primarily associated with his disability. After playing with them – and ultimately being selected to represent England – Brown discovered that the level of CP football was better than expected, and that being part of a team with other disabled athletes gave him a different perspective on embracing his cerebral palsy. Nominally a midfielder, Brown played as part of the attack for England.

He played his first match for England CP against the United States in 2013. He then took part in the 9th International Trophy of 7-aside Football in Barcelona, which England won, before being selected for the squad to compete in the 2014 European Championships. England played hosts Portugal in the opening match, with Brown subbed on at half time in the 5–0 victory. After a draw against Ukraine, England went directly into the quarter-finals, losing 5–1 to Russia, though Brown did not play in either game. The team then competed for placement, with Brown starting and scoring in their 7–1 victory over Northern Ireland. England placed fifth, their best result at the tournament in over twenty years. Brown won the Cumbria Sports Award for Disability Performance of 2014.

By 2015, Brown was playing for Askam United in the Furness Premier League, a mainstream football team. In the 2015–16 season, he played two games for Askam United and twelve games for their reserves side, scoring one goal.

Brown then represented England at the 2015 World Championships, where he was one of the top scorers. He scored a brace in England's opening game against Japan, a 14–0 victory in which he was particularly influential. England lost 1–0 to European champions Ukraine in their other group stage match, in which Brown was subbed on, which set them up against world champions Russia in their first knock-out game. Brown started again as England lost 5–0 to Russia, relegating them to the bottom half for final placement matches; their best possible result would be fifth, something they had not achieved before. Brown then scored England's first two goals in their 10–0 defeat of the United States, qualifying England for the fifth-place play-off. In the play-off against the Republic of Ireland, Brown almost scored England's second but Irish goalkeeper Simon Lestrange "[pulled] off an amazing reaction" to save his shot; England won the match 2–0 to place a best-ever fifth. This finish also qualified Great Britain to the 2016 Summer Paralympics, though Brown was not selected for the final Great Britain squad. For his performances, he won regional awards for disability sport, including being named Barrow's best adult sportsperson for 2015 (fellow footballer Georgia Stanway took the youth award) and nominated for Cumbria Sports Personality of the Year.

Brown continued playing for Askam United through the 2022–23 season. Over the course of his career with the club, he made at least 65 league appearances (scoring two goals); eight cup appearances; and two other competitive appearances. He was selected for England again in 2025, ahead of that year's European Championships.

== Television ==
In January 2025, Brown appeared on the third series of reality game show The Traitors. Brown said that he wanted to appear on the show to "represent the cerebral palsy and disability community", and that the prize money would allow him to give back to his family who had supported him. As the show went on, he was chosen by fellow contestants as the "biggest threat" and "leader of the pack" but kept in by the Traitors. In the final, the other Faithful contestants managed to banish the final Traitor but failed to realise they were all Faithful, turned on each other and eliminated two more contestants. Brown and Quigley ended up as the final two; both won.

== Personal life ==
Brown was diagnosed with cerebral palsy at nine months old. He trained as an accountant and works as a project manager. He is from Barrow-in-Furness, Cumbria. He is married.

== Honours ==
England CP

- International Trophy of 7-aside Football: 2014

Individual

- Active Cumbria Performance Award for People with a Disability: 2014, 2015
- Barrow Borough Sports Council Adult Sportsperson of the Year: 2015
