= Vitaliy Trushev =

Ukrainian Paralympic footballer

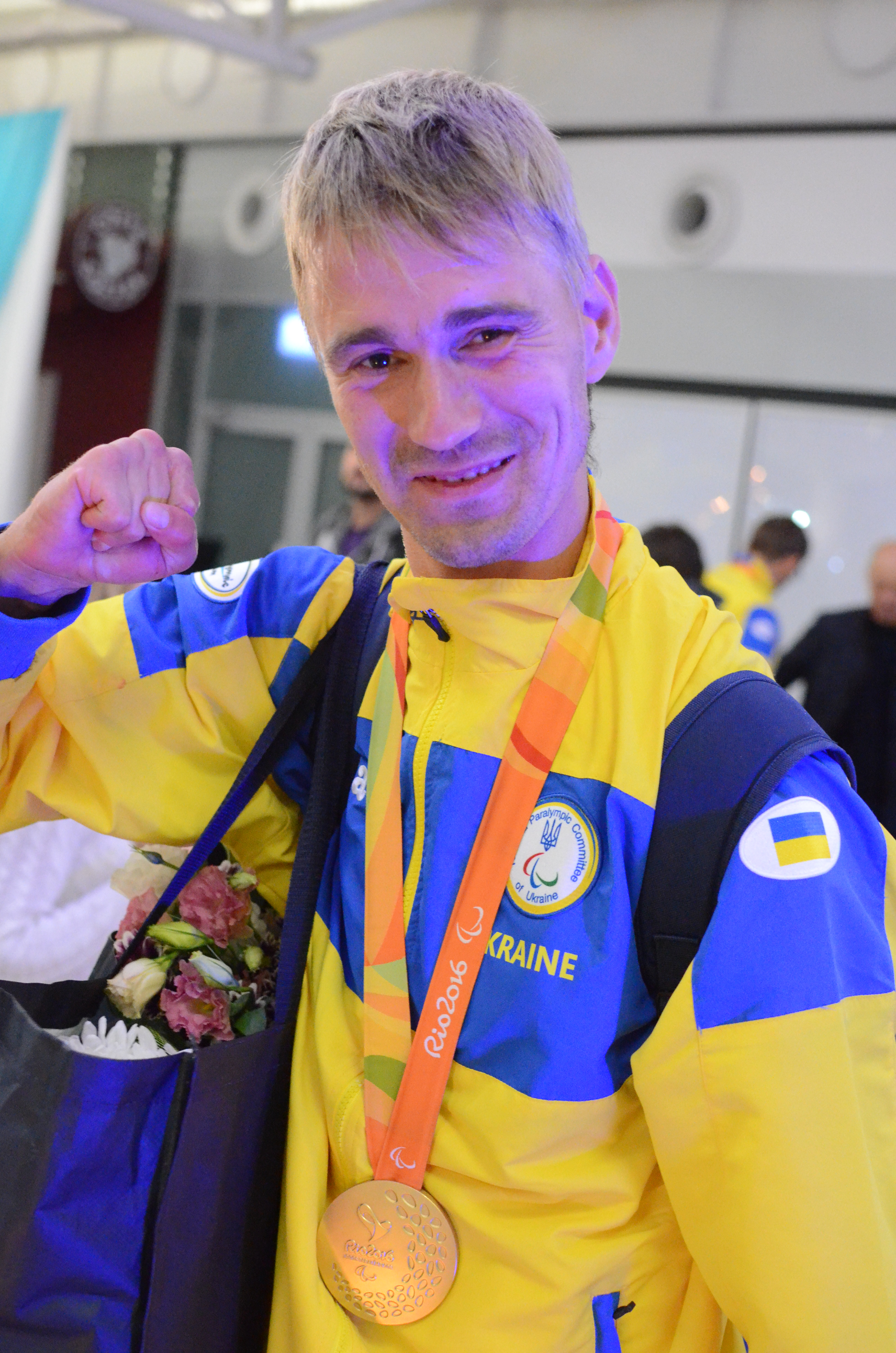

Personal information
- Nickname: Vitalik
- Nationality: Ukraine
Medal record
Men's 7-a-side football
Representing Ukraine
Paralympic Games
Gold medal – first place	2004 Athens	Team competition
Gold medal – first place	2008 Beijing	Team competition
Gold medal – first place	2016 Rio	Team competition
Silver medal – second place	2000 Sydney	Team competition
Silver medal – second place	2012 London	Team competition
World Championships
Gold medal – first place	2003 Argentina	Team competition
Gold medal – first place	2009 Netherlands	Team competition
Gold medal – first place	2013 Spain	Team competition
Gold medal – first place	2017 Argentina	Team competition
Gold medal – first place	2022 Spain	Team competition
Silver medal – second place	2005 United States	Team competition
Silver medal – second place	2015 England	Team competition
Bronze medal – third place	2007 Brazil	Team competition
Bronze medal – third place	2011 Netherlands	Team competition
European Championships
Gold medal – first place	2002 Ukraine	Team competition
Gold medal – first place	2006 Ireland	Team competition
Gold medal – first place	2010 Scotland	Team competition
Gold medal – first place	2014 Portugal	Team competition
Silver medal – second place	2018 Netherlands	Team competition

Vitaliy Trushev is a Ukrainian Paralympic footballer.

Trushev won Gold medal in Paralympic football in 2008 Summer Paralympics in China. In 2012, he participated in 2012 Summer Paralympics in London where his team won 9–0 on September 1, 2012.
