= Kostyantyn Symashko =

Ukrainian Paralympic footballer

Personal information
- Nationality: Ukrainian
- Born: 12 November 1980 (age 45)
Medal record
Men's 7-a-side football
Representing Ukraine
Paralympic Games
Gold medal – first place	2008 Beijing	Team
Gold medal – first place	2016 Rio de Janeiro	Team
Silver medal – second place	2012 London	Team
World Championships
Gold medal – first place	2009 Netherlands	Team
Gold medal – first place	2013 Spain	Team
Gold medal – first place	2017 Argentina	Team
Gold medal – first place	2022 Spain	Team
Silver medal – second place	2015 England	Team
Bronze medal – third place	2011 Netherlands	Team
European Championships
Gold medal – first place	2006 Ireland	Team
Gold medal – first place	2010 Scotland	Team
Gold medal – first place	2014 Portugal	Team
Silver medal – second place	2018 Netherlands	Team

Kostyantyn Symashko (Ukrainian: Костянтин Симашко, born 12 November 1980) is a Ukrainian Paralympic footballer who won two gold medals at the 2008 and 2016 Summer Paralympics.
