= Gavin Sibayan =

American Paralympic football player (born 1981)

Personal information
- Nationality: United States
- Born: January 3, 1981 (age 45)

Sport
- Sport: Soccer / Cerebral palsy soccer, Swimming

Achievements and titles
- Paralympic finals: 2012 Summer Paralympics
Medal record
Paralympic 7-a-side football
America's Cup
Bronze medal – third place	2014	Men's
BT Paralympic World Cup
Bronze medal – third place	2012 Manchester	Men's
International 7-a-Side Football Tournament
Silver medal – second place	2014	Men's
Swimming
Warrior Games
Gold medal – first place	2010	Men's 50-meter freestyle
Gold medal – first place	2010	Men's 100-meter freestyle
Gold medal – first place	2010	Men's 50-meter backstroke
Gold medal – first place	2010
Bronze medal – third place	2011	Men's 50-meter backstroke
- Updated on 18 June 2016

Gavin Sibayan
- Military career
- Branch: U.S. Army
- Service years: 2006 - 2011
- Rank: Staff Sergeant
- Awards: Purple Heart; Army Commendation Medal (ARCOM)

Gavin Sibayan (born January 3, 1981) is an American Paralympic football player. A United States Army veteran, Sibayan enlisted in 2001 and would retire at the rank of Staff Sergeant with an Army Commendation Medal and a Purple Heart. In 2007, he was involved in three IED incidents, the third of which left him with Traumatic Brain Injury that resulted in a permanent disability.

A high school swimmer, Sibayan transitioned to para-swimming where he represented the Army at the 2010 and 2011 Warrior Games. He won four gold medals and a bronze.

While still in active service, Sibayan was named to the USNPT team in 2010. As a member of the team, he won silver at the 2014 International 7-a-side Football Tournament, and bronze at the 2012 BT Paralympic World Cup and at the 2014 America's Cup. He was part of the USNPT at the 2012 Summer Paralympics in London, and was part of the squad in the lead up to the 2016 Summer Paralympics in Rio.

== Personal ==
Sibayan was born on January 3, 1981, and is Colorado Springs, Colorado. As a youngster, he went to Flynn Elementary and then Shaw Heights Middle School. He then attended Westminster High School, graduating in 1999. He is married and has two sons.

Sibayan is a United States Army veteran, retiring after reaching the rank of staff sergeant in 2011. He enlisted in the Army following the events of September 11. He was initially placed in the 543rd Military Police Company, 91st MP Battalion. The gunner did a tour of Iraq while in the Army from 2006 to 2008. During his tour, he was injured by three IEDs in thirty days. The third IED incident on September 8, 2007, left him with permanent paralysis as a result of a Traumatic Brain Injury and hip damage. After receiving initial treatment for his injuries two weeks after the fact in Germany, he would later be based at Fort Carson as part of the Warrior Transition Battalion. Honors he earned while serving include the Army Commendation Medal (ARCOM) and a Purple Heart.

While traveling with the USNPT in 2011 in Holland, Sibayan had a stroke.

== Swimming ==
As a junior and senior at Westminster High School, Sibayan was the captain his school's varsity swimming team.

As part of his rehabilitation, while based at Fort Carson, Sibayan trained at the pool at Colorado College. He assisted other Army vets in learning how to swim while having a disability. With only a month's lead time to train, he participated in the 2010 Warrior Games at the U.S. Olympic Training Center, Colorado Springs, Colorado in swimming events. He went into the event as one of the favored swimmers. He swam in the men's 50 and 100-meter freestyle events, and 50-meter backstroke events for swimmers with traumatic brain injuries. During the competition, he was coached by Army coach Holly Roselle. He came away from the event with four gold medals.

At the 2011 Warrior Games, Sibayan won a bronze medal in the 50-meter backstroke event for the Army. He also had a fifth-place finish in the 100-meter freestyle event and a seventh-place finish in the 50-meter freestyle. He entered the Games at a disadvantage compared to the previous year as he had less time to train as he had started to make the transition in late 2010 to soccer.

== Soccer ==
When Sibayan was a senior at Westminster High School, he captained his team's boys soccer team. Early in his high school career, he had first played in goal before he eventually transitioned to being a sweeper.

== Cerebral palsy football ==
Sibayan is a CP7 classified footballer, who plays as a midfielder or defender.

Sibayan earned his first call up to the national team in 2010, and participated in a tournament in Holland in early 2011. After that, health reasons briefly left him off the roster while he finished rehabilitation.

In 2012, Sibayan was one of three members of the USPNT to be get funding assistance from the Challenged Athlete Foundation. He represented the United States at the 2012 Ukraine International Tournament and 2012 Paralympic World Cup. He played for the United States against Great Britain in the British hosted World Cup, which Great Britain won 7–0.

Sibayan was part of the United States squad at the 2012 Summer Paralympics. The United States was drawn in Group B with Ukraine, Great Britain and Brazil. Their opener was against reigning Paralympic gold medal winners Ukraine. The United States lost in that competition to Brazil 0 - 8, and to Ukraine 0 - 9. They lost to Great Britain 0 - 4 during group play.

Sibayan was one of four defenders who participated in a national team training camp in March 2013 at the U.S. Olympic Training Center in Chula Vista, California. He was part of the United States team that participated in the 2014 Americas Cup, where he played in every game on the way to the US claiming bronze. Sabiyan opened the bronze medal match against Canada with a goal in the sixth minute on the way to the team's 3 - 0 victory. He also put in his final goal of the game. In 2014, he was part of the USPNT that competed at the 9th International 7-a-Side Football Tournament. The USPNT finished second at the tournament. In 2014, he was nominated for U.S. Soccer's Disabled Athlete of the Year award alongside deaf footballer Meghan Maiwald and powerchair footballer Natalie Russo. He came away with the prize.

In 2015 and 2016, Sibayan based his regular soccer training away from the national team at a RedLine Athletics facility, where he worked regularly with a personal trainer on ball skills. He also worked with another personal trainer on mobility, strength and conditioning In March 2015, he was part of the 14 man roster that participated in the Povoa de Varzim, Portugal hosted Footie 7 – Povoa 2015 tournament. The competition was a warmup for the World Championships that were held in England in June 2015. He was invited to a national team training camp that took place from April 29 to May 6, 2015, in Carson, California. This camp was in preparation for the 2015 Cerebral Palsy Football World Championships in June of that year in England. At that competition, he stayed on the bench in the team's 10 - 0 loss to England.

Sibayan was part of the 14 man squad that represented the United States at the 2015 Parapan American Games in Toronto. There, the United States played Canada, Venezuela, Argentina and Brazil. He took part in a national team training camp in Chula Vista, California in early March 2016. He was part of the USPNT that took part in the 2016 Pre Paralympic Tournament in Salou, Spain. The United States finished 6th after beating Argentina in one placement match 4 - 3 and losing to Ireland 4 - 1. The goals scored in the match against Argentina were the first the USA scored in the tournament, before putting up one more in their match against Ireland. The tournament featured 7 of the 8 teams participating in Rio. It was the last major preparation event ahead of the Rio Games for all teams participating.
