= Keith Johnson (soccer) =

American Paralympic soccer player (born 1980)

Personal information
- Nationality: United States
- Born: July 2, 1980 (age 46) Alaska, United States
- Occupation: Soccer coach
- Height: 1.6764 m (5 ft 6 in)
- Weight: 197 lb (89 kg)

Sport
- Sport: Soccer / Cerebral palsy soccer
- Now coaching: Texas Rush Soccer

Achievements and titles
- Paralympic finals: 2004 Summer Paralympics, 2012 Summer Paralympics
Medal record
Paralympic 7-a-side football
BT Paralympic World Cup
Bronze medal – third place	2012 Manchester	Men's
- Updated on 18 June 2016

Keith Johnson (born July 2, 1980) is an American Paralympic soccer player. Diagnosed with cerebral palsy when he was young, he played a variety of sports and graduated from East Anchorage High School in 1999.

A CP7 goalkeeper, Johnson has been a long time fixture on the USPNT, competing at the 2004 Summer Paralympics and 2012 Summer Paralympics. Throughout his national team career, Johnson has been awarded eight “Man of the Match” Awards.

== Personal ==
Johnson was born in Alaska on July 2, 1980 and was diagnosed with cerebral palsy when he was very young. As a youngster, he played and participated in a number of sports including American football, baseball, ice skating, cycling and weight training. He attended East Anchorage High School in Anchorage, Alaska, graduating in 1999. In 2003, he was working at Alaska Sales and Service, after having only completed one year of college.

Johnson later moved to Houston, Texas to help take care of his grandmother. In December 2007, he married Amanda Johnson. As of 2016, Johnson is involved with Texas Rush Soccer, serving as a staff coach.

Outside of soccer, his hobbies include US Civil War reenactment, hiking and camping.

== Cerebral palsy football ==
Johnson is a CP7 goalkeeper. Throughout his CP football career, he has been awarded eight “Man of the Match” Awards.

Johnson made his first USPNT after a tryout in Carson City, California in August 2003 with fellow Alaskan soccer player Jason Slemons. The pair were chosen for the team by national team coach Jay Hoffman. In October 2003, Johnson traveled with the team to Buenos Aires, Argentina to play with the USPNT at the Paralympic World Championships. In the lead up to Athens, he attended a national team training camp at the ARCO Olympic Training. He competed at the 2004 Summer Paralympics. He was in goal in the US's opening game 4 - 0 loss to Brazil.

Johnson was a member of the US team that participated in the 2011 CPISRA World Championships. In 2012, he was one of three members of the USPNT to be get funding assistance from the Challenged Athlete Foundation. He participated in the 2012 BT Paralympic World Cup, where the United States won a bronze medal. He was in goal for the team's bronze medal match game against Ireland, where the US came away with a 2 - 1 victory.

Johnson was a member of the US team at the 2012 Summer Paralympics. He was one of only two players on the roster with previous Paralympic experience. He was one of two members of the whole of the United States Paralympic team that were born in Alaska. The United States was drawn in Group B with Ukraine, Great Britain and Brazil. Their opener was against reigning Paralympic gold medal winners Ukraine. They lost to Great Britain 0 - 4 during group play. In 2012, he was awarded a Golden Glove Award.

Johnson was one of two goalkeepers who participated in a national team training camp in March 2013 at the U.S. Olympic Training Center in Chula Vista, California. In April 2014, he was invited to participate in a week long national team training camp at the Olympic Training Center in Chula Vista, California. The camp was being held in preparation for the 7-a-side Football Ciutat de Barcelona in June of that year. In March 2015, he was part of the 14 man roster that participated in the Povoa de Varzim, Portugal hosted Footie 7 – Povoa 2015 tournament. The competition was a warmup for the World Championships that were held in England in June 2015. He was invited to a national team training camp that took place from April 29 to May 6, 2015, in Carson, California. This camp was in preparation for the 2015 Cerebral Palsy Football World Championships in June of that year in England.

Participating at the Cerebral Palsy Football World Championships, Johnson was in goal for the US's game 3–0 victory against Venezuela and the team's 10–0 loss to England. He sat on the bench in the United States's 2 - 1 win against Scotland. He was part of the 14 man squad that represented the United States at the 2015 Parapan American Games in Toronto. There, the United States played Canada, Venezuela, Argentina and Brazil. He played in goal in the United States' 0 - 6 loss to Brazil at the Parapan Games.

Johnson took part in a national team training camp in Chula Vista, California in early March 2016. He was part of the USPNT that took part in the 2016 Pre Paralympic Tournament in Salou, Spain. The United States finished 6th after beating Argentina in one placement match 4 - 3 and losing to Ireland 4 - 1. The goals scored in the match against Argentina were the first the USA scored in the tournament, before putting up one more in their match against Ireland. The tournament featured 7 of the 8 teams participating in Rio. It was the last major preparation event ahead of the Rio Games for all teams participating.
