= Denmark national cerebral palsy football team =

- Federation: Danish Sports Organization for the Disabled
- IFCPF ranking: 18
- Highest IFCPF ranking: 18 (July 2011, September 2012, 2016)
- Lowest IFCPF ranking: 21 (August 2013, November 2014)

Denmark national cerebral palsy football team is the national cerebral palsy football team for Denmark that represents the country in international competitions. The team has never participated in the Paralympic Games but has been involved in several international tournaments.

== Background ==
The Danish Sports Organization for the Disabled manages the national team. In May 2013, the International Federation of Cerebral Palsy Football (IFCPF) hosted a coaching workshop in Austria, drawing attendees from Austria, Singapore, Italy, Denmark, and Jordan. The goal was to develop coaches for both national and international level competitions. Despite actively participating in international regional competitions by 2016, Denmark lacked a national championship to foster development and selection of players for the national team.

== Ranking ==
Denmark was ranked eighteenth in the world by the IFCPF in 2016. The team was ranked twenty-first in the world in August 2013 and November 2014. In July 2011 and September 2012, the team was ranked eighteenth.

== Results ==
Denmark has never participated in a Paralympic Games since the sport made its debut at the 1984 Games despite being involved in various international tournaments. In early August 2016, the country hosted and competed in the IFCPF Qualification Tournament for the World Championships in Vejen, Denmark. The tournament was part of the qualifying process for the 2017 IFCPF World Championships. Other teams scheduled to participate included Scotland, Canada, Portugal, Iran, Northern Ireland, Australia, Venezuela, Japan, Republic of South Korea, Germany, and Spain.

Competition	Location	Year	Total Teams	Result	Ref
Dublin Friendship Cup	Dublin, Ireland	2016			
Northern European Open Championship	Denmark	2015	4		
Euro Football 7-a-side	Maia, Portugal	2014	11	10	
