= Germany national cerebral palsy football team =

to August 25, 2016
- Federation: National Paralympic Committee Germany
- IFCPF ranking: 17
- Highest IFCPF ranking: 17 (2016)
- Lowest IFCPF ranking: 23 (August 2013)

Germany national cerebral palsy football team is the national cerebral football team for Germany that represents the team in international competitions. The team has never participated at the Paralympic Games but has participated at several international tournaments.

== Background ==
National Paralympic Committee Germany manages the national team. In November 2013, a coaching workshop was held in the country to try to further develop the sport. In 2012, an IFCPF coaching workshop was held in Germany. There were participants from Germany and Austria. While Germany was active in participating in international regional competitions by 2016, the country did not have a national championships to support national team player development.

== Ranking ==
Germany was ranked seventeenth in the world by the IFCPF in 2016. In November 2014,Germany was ranked twentieth. Germany was ranked twenty-third in August 2013.

== Results ==
The country has never participated in a Paralympic Games since the sport made its debut at the 1984 Games.

Germany has participated in a number of international tournaments. In 2013, the team participated in the Football Development Tournament in Vienna. The tournament was organized by Austrian Disability Sports Federation (OBSV), with Germany, the Netherlands, Austria and Singapore all participating. The team was scheduled to participate in the 2016 IFCPF Qualification Tournament World Championships in Vejen, Denmark in early August. The tournament was part of the qualifying process for the 2017 IFCPF World Championships. Other teams scheduled to participate included Scotland, Canada, Portugal, Iran, Northern Ireland, Australia, Venezuela, Japan, Republic of South Korea, Denmark, and Spain.

Competition	Location	Year	Total Teams	Result	Ref
IFCPF World Championships Qualification Tournament	Vejen, Denmark	2016			
Northern European Open Championship	Denmark	2015	4		
CP Football Tournament Lavamund	Lavamund, Austria	2015	3		
Euro Football 7-a-side	Maia, Portugal	2014	11	9	
Football Development Tournament	Vienna, Austria	2013	4		
