= Ukraine national cerebral palsy football team =

- Federation: NPC Ukraine
- IFCPF ranking: 1
- Highest IFCPF ranking: 1 (2016)
- Lowest IFCPF ranking: 2 (November 2014, September 2012)

Ukraine national cerebral palsy football team is the national cerebral football team for Ukraine that represents the team in international competitions. The country has appeared at the Paralympic Games in 2000, 2004, 2008 and 2012 where they have medaled each time. At the 2015 IFCPF World Championships, Ukraine finished second. This bettered the 2011 edition where they finished third.

== Background ==
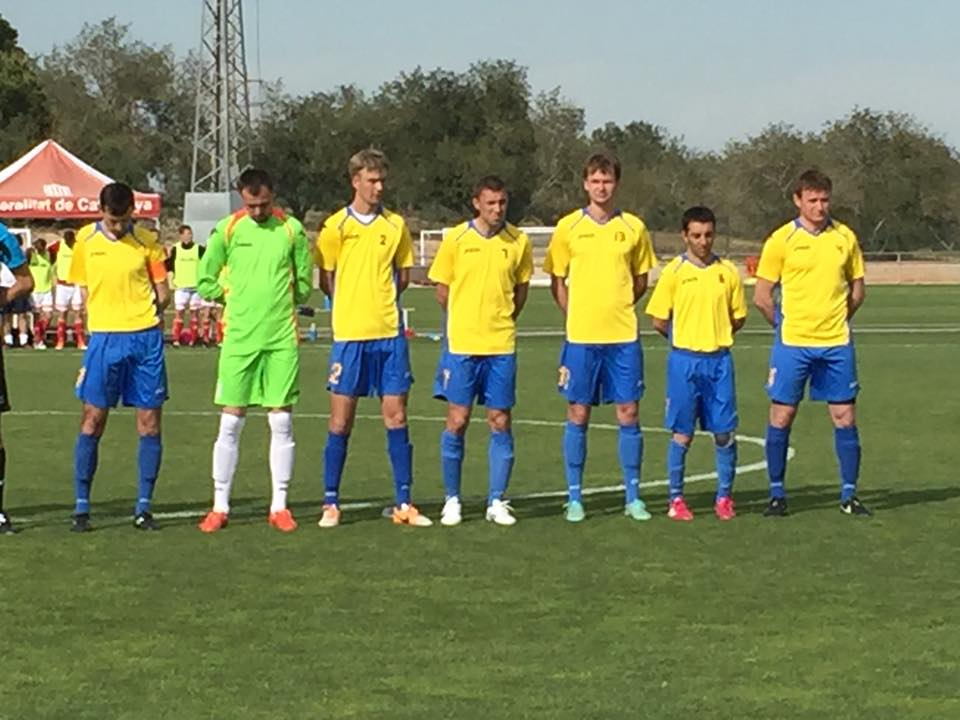
Ukraine lined up for a game at the 2016 Salou tournament.

National Paralympic Committee of Ukraine manages the national team. During the 2000s, the team was one of the top four most dominant teams in the world alongside Brazil, Russia and Iran. In 2011 and 2012, the team was coached by Sergiy Ovcharenko. Ukraine was active internationally by 2016, and had national championships to support national team player development. National team development is supported by an International Federation of Cerebral Palsy Football (IFCPF) recognized national championship. Recognized years for the national IFCPF recognized competition include 2010, 2011, 2012, 2013, 2014, and 2015.

In 2016, after getting an endorsement by the World AntiDoping Agency (WADA), the IFCPF Anti-Doping Code was formally amended to allow for out of competition testing. This was done through a WADA approved Whereabouts Programme managed through ADAMS. Drawing from players in a Registered Testing Pool, players from this country were included ahead of the 2016 Summer Paralympics in Rio.

== Ranking ==
In 2016, the country was ranked 1st in the world by the IFCPF. In November 2014, the team was ranked number 2 in the world. In August 2013, the team was ranked number 2 in the world. In September 2012, the team was ranked number 2 in the world. In September 2011, the team was ranked number 1 in the world.

== Players ==
There have been a number of players for the Ukrainian squad.

Name	Number	Classification	Position	Years active	Ref
Volodymyr Antoniuk				2016	
Sergii Babii	3	FT6		2012	
Oleksandr Devlysh	11	FT7	Defender	2011-2012	
Ivan Dotsenko	9	FT7		2012	
Taras Dutko	4	FT8	Midfielder	2011-2012, 2014	
Igor Kosenko	18	FT6		2012	
Artem Krasylnykov				2016	
Dmytro Molodtsov	2	FT5	Fielder	2012, 2014	
Mykola Mykhovych	9	FT6	Midfielder	2011	
Hetun Oleksiy	10	FT7	Forward	2011-2012	
Denys Ponomarov	8	FT8	Defender	2011, 2014	
Vitalii Romanchuk			Fielder	2014	
Ivan Rusinka	12	FT7		2012	
Anatolii Shevchyk	5	FT8	Defender	2011-2012	
Ivan Shkvarlo	6	FT7	Defender	2011-2012	
Kostyantyn Symashko / Konstiantyn Symashko	1	FT7	Goalkeeper	2011-2012, 2016	
Vitaliy Trushev	2	FT7	Defender	2011	
Andriy Tsukanov	7	FT7		2012	
Serghiy Vakulenko	3	FT6	Defender	2011	
Antoniuk Volodymyr / Antonyuk Volodymyr	11	FT7	Forward	2011, 2014	
Maryan Voronyak	14	FT7		2012	
Yevhen Zinoviev / Ievgen Zinoviev	13	FT5	Fielder	2012, 2014	

== Results ==
Ukraine has participated in a number of international tournaments. Ukraine won the 2016 Pre-Paralympic Tournament in Salou, Spain after beating Brazil 0 - 2 in the final.

Competition	Location	Year	Total Teams	Result	Ref
Pre-Paralympic Tournament	Salou, Spain	2016		1	
Footie 7 Tournament	Povao de Varzim, Portugal	2015	5	1	
Euro Football 7-a-side	Maia, Portugal	2014	11	1	
CPISRA 7-a-side Football Friendly Tournament	Groesbeek, Netherlands	2014	3	3	
Intercontinental Cup	Barcelona, Spain	2013	16		
British Paralympic World Cup	Nottingham, England	2012	12		
Yevpretoria Ukraine	Yevpatoria, Crimea, Ukraine	2012	8		
Forvard International Tournament	Sochi, Russia	2012	5		
Torneo “G. Facchetti”	Pesaro, Italy	2011	4	2	
CPISRA International Championships	Arnhem, Netherlands	2009	11		

=== IFCPF World Championships ===
Ukraine has participated in the IFCPF World Championships. At the 2011 CP-ISRA World Championship in Drenthe, Ukraine beat Canada 5 - 0.

World Championships	Location	Total Teams	Result	Ref
2015 IFCPF World Championships	England	15	2	
2011 CPSIRA World Championships	Netherlands	16	3	
2007 CPISRA World Championships	Rio de Janeiro, Brazil		3	
2003 CPISRA World Championships	Buenos Aires, Argentina		1	
1998 CPISRA World Championships	Rio de Janeiro, Brazil		2	

=== Paralympic Games ===
Ukraine has participated in 7-a-side football at the Paralympic Games.

Paralympic Results

Games	Results	Ref
2016 Summer Paralympics	1	
2012 Summer Paralympics	2	
2008 Summer Paralympics	1	
2004 Summer Paralympics	1	
2000 Summer Paralympics	2	
