= Ireland national cerebral palsy football team =

- Federation: Football Association of Ireland (FAI)
- Head coach: Paul Smyth (men's); Aisling Conway (women's)
- Asst coach: Alvin Rouse
- Captain: Joe Markey
- IFCPF ranking: 8 (February 2026)
- Highest IFCPF ranking: 5 (2017)
- Lowest IFCPF ranking: 8 (December 2024)

The Ireland national cerebral palsy football team represents the Republic of Ireland in men's international cerebral palsy (CP) football. They have participated in several Paralympic Games and World Championships. Despite limiting representation to the Republic of Ireland state, the team is known as Ireland in international competitions held by the International Paralympic Committee and the IFCPF.

They have won two bronze medals and a silver at the Paralympics. Their best finish at the World Championships was first at the 1982 edition in Denmark.

== Background ==
Paralympics Ireland manages the national team. Paralympics Ireland, Sport Ireland and the Football Association of Ireland (FAI) co-fund the cerebral palsy national team. The team is known as Ireland in competition as the International Paralympic Committee and IFCPF follow standard United Nations naming protocols. This differs from FIFA and UEFA competitions, which strictly mandate the name "Republic of Ireland" to distinguish them from Northern Ireland.

Ireland won the inaugural 1982 CPISRA World Championships, held in Denmark. In 2011, members of the Irish national team participated in a study that looking at endurance and running performance as part of a researcher's efforts to understand the fairness of cerebral palsy football classification. In October 2014, an IFCPF coaching workshop was held in Wales to try to further develop the sport, with participants from Wales, England and the Republic of Ireland. While Ireland was active in participating on the Paralympic and World Championship level by 2016, the country did not have a national championships to support national team player development.

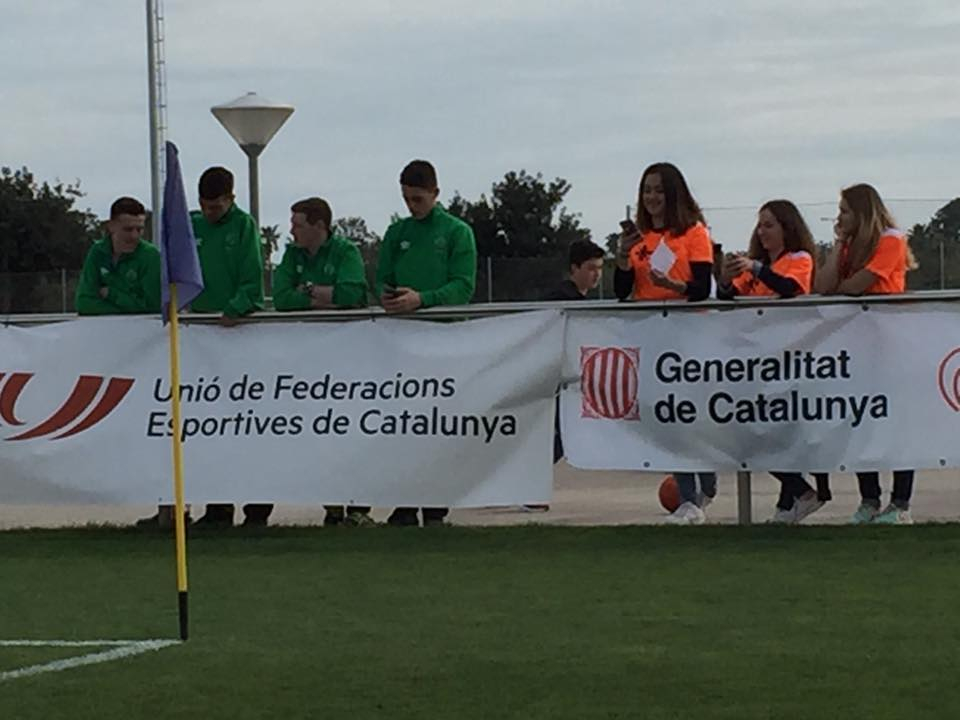
Irish players watching a match at the 2016 Salou tournament.

In 2016, after getting an endorsement by the World AntiDoping Agency (WADA), the IFCPF Anti-Doping Code was formally amended to allow for out of competition testing. This was done through a WADA approved Whereabouts Programme managed through ADAMS. Drawing from players in a Registered Testing Pool, players from this country were included ahead of the 2016 Summer Paralympics in Rio. In November 2025, after 20 years in charge of the international CP team, Mick Doyle retired as Irish manager.

== Ranking ==
Ireland was ranked fifth in the world by the IFCPF in 2016. In September 2012, August 2013 and November 2014, the team was ranked number seven in the world. In July 2011, the team was ranked sixth in the world.

As of February 2026, the team is ranked eighth in the world.

== Players ==
=== Squads ===
The following players were called up for the 2026 World Cup.

=== Men's team ===
No.	Pos.	Player	Date of birth (age)	Club
	GK	Luke Staunton		
	GK	Ruadhan Dooley MacDonough		
	DF	Conor Halpin (FT2)		(Football Association of Ireland) Raheny United
	DF	Carl McKee		(Football Association of Ireland) Swords Manor FC
	DF	Darren Martin		(Football Association of Ireland) Carrick Rovers AFC
	MF	Ryan Nolan (FT3)	1992 (age 33–34)	(Football Association of Ireland) Glencormac United
11	MF	James Bateman (FT2)		(Football Association of Ireland) Cahir Park
	MF	Jake Hannon		
	MF	Eric O'Flaherty (FT2)		(Football Association of Ireland) West United
	MF	Aaron Tier		
10	FW	Dillon Sheridan (FT3)		(Football Association of Ireland) ROC Celtic
	FW	Darryl Fay		
	FW	Jack O'Sullivan		(Football Association of Ireland) Aultagh Celtic FC
	FW	Warren Morrissey (FT2)		(Football Association of Ireland) Gorey Celtic FC

=== Women's team ===
No.	Pos.	Player	Date of birth (age)	Club
	GK	Reeva Merriman		
	DF	Casey Heaney		(Football Association of Ireland) Raharney United
	DF	Elise Friel		
	DF	Isobel Clarke		
	DF	Aisling Duncan		
	MF	Katie Finegan		
	MF	Ella Sherlock		
	FW	Eva Walsh		
	MF	Kate Connolly		
	FW	Robyn Ennis		

=== Recent call-ups ===
The following players have been called up to the national team in the past 24 months but are not part of the current squad.

Pos.	Player	Date of birth (age)	Caps	Goals	Club	Latest call-up
GK	Sean Daly (FT1)				(Republic of Ireland) Meath	2025 IFCPF European Championships^{RET}
DF	Joe Markey (FT2)	1987 (age 38–39)	135	23	(Republic of Ireland) Monaghan	2025 IFCPF European Championship^{RET}
MF	Warren Morrissey				(Republic of Ireland) Wexford	2025 IFCPF European Championship
FW	Jack O'Sullivan				(Republic of Ireland) Cork	2025 IFCPF European Championship
^{INJ} Withdrew from latest squad due to injury^{PRE} Preliminary squad / standby^{RET} Retired from the national team^{WD} Player withdrew from the squad due to a non-injury issue^{SUS} Player is suspended

== Results ==
Ireland has participated in a number of international tournaments.

Competition	Location	Year	Total Teams	Result	Ref
Pre-Paralympic Tournament	Salou, Spain	2016	7	5	
Northern European Open Championship	Denmark	2015	4	2	
Euro Football 7-a-side	Maia, Portugal	2014	11	4	
Intercontinental Cup	Barcelona, Spain	2013	16		
Ireland CP International Tournament	Ireland	2013	4		
2012 Paralympic World Cup	London, England	2012	4		
Nottingham British Paralympic World Cup	Nottingham, England	2010	4		
CPISRA International Championships	Arnhem, Netherlands	2009	11		
Nations Cup	Lilleshall, England	2009	4		

=== IFCPF World Championships ===
The Republic of Ireland has participated in the IFCPF World Championships. At the 2011 CP-ISRA World Championship in Drenthe, Ireland beat Canada 6 - 0.

World Championships	Location	Total Teams	Result	Ref
2015 IFCPF World Championships	England	15	6	
2011 CPSIRA World Championships	Netherlands	16	9	
1994 CPISRA World Championships	Dublin, Ireland		2	
1990 CPISRA World Championships	Assen, Netherlands		2	
1986 CPISRA World Championships	Gits, Belgium		3	
1982 CPISRA World Championships	Greve, Denmark		1	

=== Paralympic Games ===
Ireland has participated in 7-a-side football at the Paralympic Games. Their best performance was at the 1992 and 1984 Games when they won silver medals. They also won a bronze at the 1988 Games. After qualifying for the gold medal game in the sport's debut at the 1984 Summer Games, they lost their match to Belgium to finish with a silver medal.

Paralympic Results

Games	Results	Ref
2016 Summer Paralympics	8	
2008 Summer Paralympics	6	
2004 Summer Paralympics	7	
1996 Summer Paralympics		
1992 Summer Paralympics	3	
1988 Summer Paralympics	3	
1984 Summer Paralympics	2	
