= Scotland national cerebral palsy football team =

Scotland national cerebral palsy football team is the national cerebral football team for Scotland that represents the team in international competitions. At the 2015 IPCPF World Championships, Scotland finished 9th after defeating Canada in overtime.

== Background ==
Scottish Disability Sport (SDS) manages the national team. While Scotland was active in participating on the World Championship level by 2016, the country did not have a national championships to support national team player development.

== Ranking ==
Scotland was ranked ninth in the world by the IFCPF in 2016. In November 2014, they were ranked seventh. In August 2013, the team was eighth. Scotland was ranked sixth in September 2012. The team was ranked seventh in July 2011.

== Players ==
There have been a number of players for the Scottish squad.

| Name | Number | Classification | Position | Years active | Ref |
|---|---|---|---|---|---|
| Thomas Brown | 11 | FT6 | Fielder | 2013 | |
| Craig Connell | 1 | FT7 | Goalkeeper | 2010, 2013 | |
| Michael Glynn | 2 | FT7 | Fielder | 2013 | |
| Connor Hay | 8 | FT8 | | 2010 | |
| Martin Hickman | 9 | FT7 | Fielder | 2013 | |
| Keiran Martin | 2 | FT7 | | 2010 | |
| Scott Martin | 12 | FT5 | Goalkeeper | 2013 | |
| Laurie McGinley | 10 | FT8 | | 2010 | |
| Duncan McPherson | 5 | FT7 | | 2010 | |
| Jamie Mitchell | 5 | FT7 | Fielder | 2013 | |
| Jonathan O'Hara | 3 | FT7 | Fielder | 2013 | |
| Graeme Paterson | 6 | FT7 | | 2010 | |
| Jonathan Patterson | 10 | FT7 | Fielder | 2010, 2013 | |
| James Richmond | 8 | FT7 | Fielder | 2013 | |
| Mark Roberston | 7 | FT7 | Fielder | 2010, 2013 | |
| Jamie Trevit | 6, 3 | FT6 | Fielder | 2010, 2013 | |
| Scott Troup | 4 | FT8 | Fielder | 2010, 2013 | |
| Thomas Brown | 11 | FT6 | Fielder | 2013 | |
| Craig Gray | 5,8 | FT7 | Fielder | 2005, 2009 | |

== Results ==
Scotland has participated in a number of international tournaments. The team was scheduled to participate in the 2016 IFCPF Qualification Tournament World Championships in Vejen, Denmark in early August. The tournament was part of the qualifying process for the 2017 IFCPF World Championships. Other teams scheduled to participate included Canada, Portugal, Iran, Northern Ireland, Australia, Venezuela, Japan, Republic of South Korea, Germany, Denmark, and Spain.

| Competition | Location | Year | Total Teams | Result | Ref |
|---|---|---|---|---|---|
| CPISRA World Games | Nottingham, England | 2015 | 7 | 4 | |
| Euro Football 7-a-side | Maia, Portugal | 2014 | 11 | 5 | |
| Intercontinental Cup | Barcelona, Spain | 2013 | 16 | | |
| Ireland CP International Tournament | Ireland | 2013 | 4 | | |
| Inverclyde, Largs Scotland | Inverclyde, Scotland | 2010 | 2 | | |
| CPISRA International Championships | Arnhem, Netherlands | 2009 | 11 | | |
| Nations Cup | Lilleshall, England | 2009 | 4 | | |

=== IFCPF World Championships ===
Scotland has participated in the IFCPF World Championships. At the 2011 CP-ISRA World Championship in Drenthe, Scotland defeated Canada 4 - 1.

| World Championships | Location | Total Teams | Result | Ref |
|---|---|---|---|---|
| 2015 IFCPF World Championships | England | 15 | 9 (2-2 after full-time, won 5–3 against Canada in extra time) | |
| 2011 CPSIRA World Championships | Netherlands | 16 | 6 | |
