= Netherlands national cerebral palsy football team =

- Federation: Koninklijke Nederlandse Voetbalbond (KNVB)
- IFCPF ranking: 4
- Highest IFCPF ranking: 4 (2016, November 2014, August 2013)
- Lowest IFCPF ranking: 5 (September 2012, July 2011)

Netherlands national cerebral palsy football team is the national cerebral football team for the Netherlands that represents the team in international competitions. The team has participated in every Paralympic Games since the sport made its debut in 1988, winning gold medals in 1988, 1992 and 1996. At the most recent IFCPF World Championships in 2015, they finished fourth. They had first-place finishes at the World Championships in 1986, 1990 and 1994.

== Background ==
Koninklijke Nederlandse Voetbalbond (KNVB) manages the national team. With international cerebral palsy football starting in 1978, the Netherlands quickly emerged as one of the most dominant teams in the world during the 1980s.

In 2012, the team was coached by Marcel Geestman. While the Netherlands was active in participating on the Paralympic and World Championship level by 2016, the country did not have a national championships to support national team player development. In 2016, after getting an endorsement by the World AntiDoping Agency (WADA), the IFCPF Anti-Doping Code was formally amended to allow for out of competition testing. This was done through a WADA approved Whereabouts Programme managed through ADAMS. Drawing from players in a Registered Testing Pool, players from this country were included ahead of the 2016 Summer Paralympics in Rio.

== Ranking ==
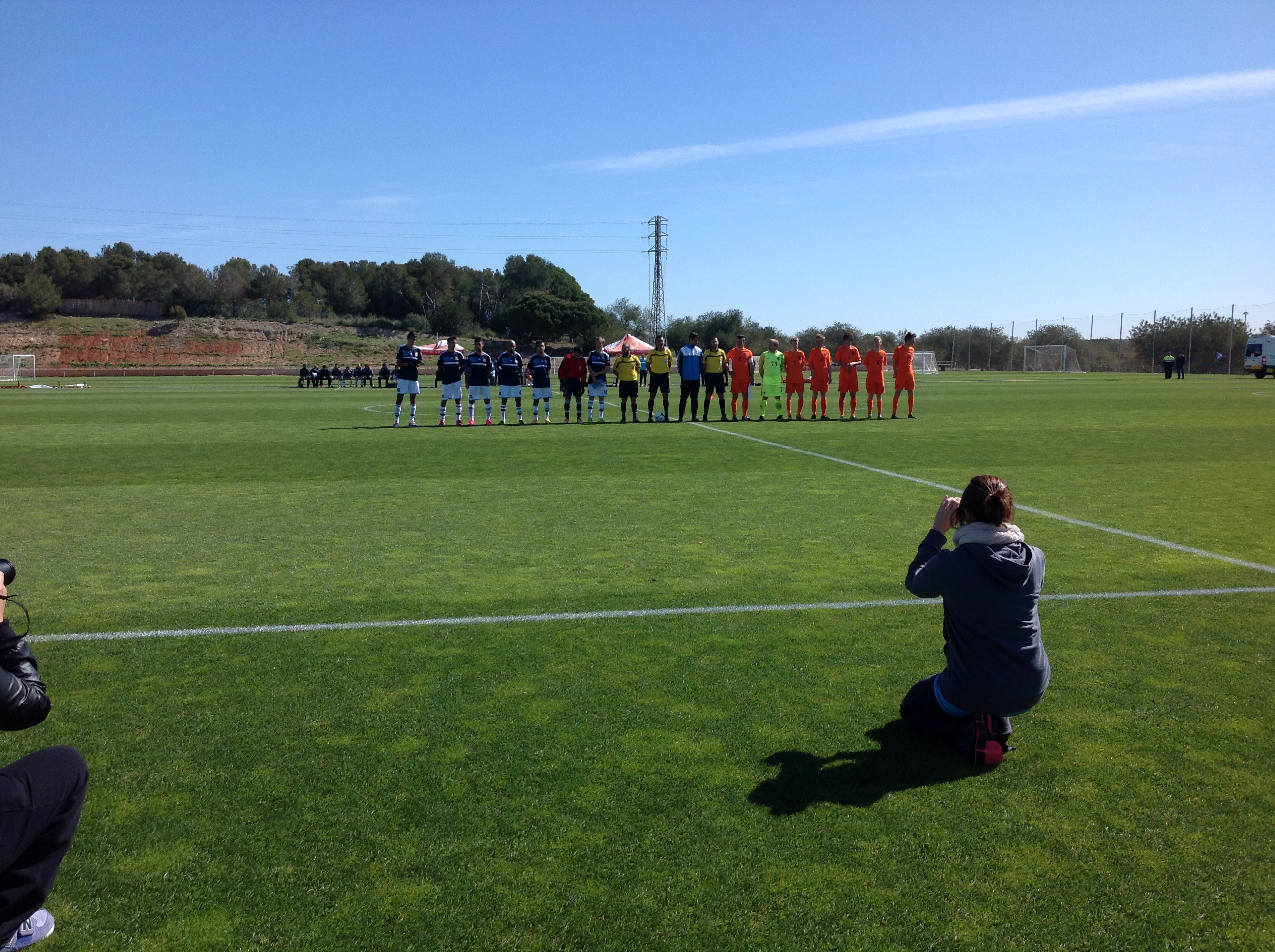
Argentina and the Netherlands warm up ahead of a match at the 2016 Salou tournament.

In 2016, the Netherlands was ranked fourth in the world by the IFCPF. They maintained this ranking in November 2014 and August 2013. Prior to this, in September 2012 and July 2011, the team was ranked number fifth in the world.

== Players ==
There have been a number of players for the Dutch squad.

Name	Number	Classification	Position	Years active	Ref
Paul Aarntzen	3	FT7		2010	
Bart Adelaars	1	FT6	Goalkeeper	2010-2011, 2013	
Gerard Arends	16	FT7	Fielder	2010-2013	
Stefan Boersma	16	FT5, FT6	Goalkeeper	2012-2013	
Jeffrey Bruinier	4	FT7		2010	
Lars Conijn / Lars Conyn	5	FT7	Fielder	2010-2011, 2013–2014, 206	
Minne De Vos	13	FT7	Fielder	2013	
Wietse de Haan	3	FT7		2012	
Daan Dikken	14	FT7	Fielder	2010-2013	
Myron Gebbink	4	FT5	Fielder	2011-2013	
Michael Kies	23	FT6		2012	
Peter Kooij	6	FT8	Fielder	2011, 2013	
Mitch Lebon	2	FT7	Fielder	2013	
Stephan Lockhoff	10	FT7	Fielder	2010-2013	
Joey Mense	15	FT7	Fielder	2010-2013	
Rik Rodenburg	17	FT8	Fielder	2013	
Pawel Statema	8	FT7		2010-2011	
Dennis Straatman	7	FT8		2010-2012	
Kasper Stroes	2	FT8		2011	
John Swinkels	9	FT7	Fielder	2010-2011, 2013	
George van Altena	12	FT6		2012	
Rudi van Breemen	1	FT5		2010-2011	
Jay van Elten	17	FT6		2010	
Patrick van Kempen	6	FT8		2010	
Tom van Reusel	18	FT7		2010	
Iljas Visker	11	FT8	Fielder	2011-2014, 2016	
Jorik Vlieg			Fielder	2014	
Jeroen Voogd	2	FT7		2012	
Abel Walraven	17	FT7		2012	

== Results ==
The Netherlands has participated in a number of international tournaments.

At the Football 7-a-side International Tournament in Portugal in 2011, the Netherlands beat Canada 4 - 0 and 3 - 1. In 2013, the team participated in the Football Development Tournament in Vienna. The tournament was organized by Austrian Disability Sports Federation (OBSV), with Germany, the Netherlands, Austria and Singapore all participating. The Netherlands finished third at the 2016 Pre-Paralympic Tournament in Salou, Spain after beating Great Britain 3 - 2 in the bronze medal game.

Competition	Location	Year	Total Teams	Result	Ref
Pre-Paralympic Tournament	Salou, Spain	2016		3	
Footie 7 Tournament	Povao de Varzim, Portugal	2015	5	4	
CPISRA World Games	Nottingham, England	2015	7	5	
Euro Football 7-a-side	Maia, Portugal	2014	11	2	
CPISRA 7-a-side Football Friendly Tournament	Groesbeek, Netherlands	2014	3	2	
Intercontinental Cup	Barcelona, Spain	2013	16		
Football Development Tournament	Vienna, Austria	2013	4		
Ireland CP International Tournament	Ireland	2013	4		
British Paralympic World Cup	Nottingham, England	2012	12		
Yevpretoria Ukraine	Yevpatoria, Crimea, Ukraine	2012	8		
Forvard International Tournament	Sochi, Russia	2012	5		
Football 7-a-side International Tournament	Porto, Portugal	2011	4		
Nottingham British Paralympic World Cup	Nottingham, England	2010	4		
Inverclyde, Largs Scotland	Inverclyde, Scotland	2010	2		

=== IFCPF World Championships ===
Netherlands has participated in the IFCPF World Championships.

World Championships	Location	Total Teams	Result	Ref
2015 IFCPF World Championships	England	15	4	
2011 CPSIRA World Championships	Netherlands	16	5	
1994 CPISRA World Championships	Dublin, Ireland		1	
1990 CPISRA World Championships	Assen, Netherlands		1	
1986 CPISRA World Championships	Gits, Belgium		1	
1982 CPISRA World Championships	Greve, Denmark		2	

=== Paralympic Games ===
The Netherlands has participated in 7-a-side football at the Paralympic Games.

Paralympic Results

Games	Results	Ref
2012 Summer Paralympics	5	
2008 Summer Paralympics	5	
2004 Summer Paralympics	6	
2000 Summer Paralympics	8	
1996 Summer Paralympics	1	
1992 Summer Paralympics	1	
1988 Summer Paralympics	1	
