= Northern Ireland national cerebral palsy football team =

- Federation: Irish Football Association
- IFCPF ranking: 13
- Highest IFCPF ranking: 13 (November 2014, 2016)
- Lowest IFCPF ranking: 21 (July 2011, September 2012)

Northern Ireland national cerebral palsy football team is the national cerebral football team for Northern Ireland that represents the team in international competitions. The team was ranked thirteenth in the world in 2016. At the 2015 IFCPF World Championships, they finished fourteenth in a fifteen deep field.

== Background ==
The Irish Football Association manages the national team. While Northern Ireland was active in participating on the World Championship level by 2016, the country did not have a national championships to support national team player development.

== Ranking ==
Northern Ireland was ranked thirteenth in the world by the IFCPF in November 2014 and 2016. In August 2013, the team was ranked fifteenth. Northern Ireland was ranked twenty-first in July 2011 and September 2012.

== Results ==
Northern Ireland has participated in a number of international tournaments. The team was scheduled to participate in the 2016 IFCPF Qualification Tournament World Championships in Vejen, Denmark in early August. The tournament was part of the qualifying process for the 2017 IFCPF World Championships. Other teams scheduled to participate included Scotland, Canada, Portugal, Iran, Australia, Venezuela, Japan, Republic of South Korea, Germany, Denmark, and Spain.

Competition	Location	Year	Total Teams	Result	Ref
IFCPF World Championships Qualification Tournament	Vejen, Denmark	2016			
Euro Football 7-a-side	Maia, Portugal	2014	11	8	
Intercontinental Cup	Barcelona, Spain	2013	16		
Nations Cup	Lilleshall, England	2009			

=== IFCPF World Championships ===
Northern Ireland has participated in the IFCPF World Championships.

World Championships	Location	Total Teams	Result	Ref
2015 IFCPF World Championships	England	15	14	
