= 2016 IFCPF World Championships Qualification Tournament =

Tournament details
- Host country: Denmark
- Dates: 29 July – 6 August 2016
- Teams: 13
- Venue(s): 1 (in 1 host city)

Final positions
- Champions: Iran
- Runners-up: Scotland
- Third place: Venezuela
- Fourth place: Portugal

Tournament statistics
- Matches played: 36
- Goals scored: 165 (4.58 per match)
- Top scorer(s): (Canada) Samuel Charron (15)

The 2016 IFCPF World Championships Qualification Tournament was a tournament for men's national 7-a-side association football teams. IFCPF stands for International Federation of Cerebral Palsy Football. Athletes with a physical disability competed. The Championship took place in England from 29 July – 6 August 2016 .

Football CP Football was played with modified FIFA rules. Among the modifications were that there were seven players, no offside, a smaller playing field, and permission for one-handed throw-ins. Matches consisted of two thirty-minute halves, with a fifteen-minute half-time break. The Championships was a qualifying event for the 2017 IFCPF CP Football World Championships

== Participating teams and officials ==
=== Qualifying ===
The following teams are qualified for the tournament:

Means of qualification	Berths	Qualified
Host nation	1	Denmark
African Region	0	none
Americas Region	2	Canada; Venezuela
Asian Region	3	Iran; Japan (South Korea) Korea
European Region	6	Finland; Germany; Northern Ireland; Portugal; Scotland; Spain
Oceania Region	1	Australia
Total	13	

=== The draw ===
During the draw, the teams were divided into pots because of rankings. Here, the following groups:

	Group A	Group B	Group C	Group D
Pot 1	Scotland (9)	Portugal (11)	Iran (12)	Canada (10)
Pot 2	Australia (14)	Venezuela (15)	Northern Ireland (13)	Japan (16)
Pot 3	Spain (18)	(South Korea) Korea (18)	Germany (17)	Finland (21)
no Pot				Denmark (18)
The teams of Austria (21), Mexico (21) and Singapore (21) did not take part in the tournament.

=== Squads ===
Group A

Scotland	Australia	Spain
1 Barry Halloran; 2 Blair Glynn; 3 Martin Hickman; 4 Lewis McIntyre; 5 Sean Stewart; 6 Ian Paton; 7 Mark Robertson; 8 Jamie Mitchell; 9 Kyle Hannin; 10 Jonathan Paterson; 11 Cameron Pollock; 13 Chris Tucker; 14 Blair McGregor; 15 Kieran Martin	1 Samuel Larkings GK); 2 Benjamin Roche (DF)/(MF); 3 Jack Williams (DF); 4 Nicolas Prescott (FW)/(MF); 5 Ryan Kinner (MF); 6 Chris Pyne (DF); 7 David Barber (DF); 9 Ben Atkins (MF); 10 Conor Marsh (DF); 12 Matthew Hearne (DF)/(MF); 13 Cosimo Cirillo (FW); 14 Zachary Jones (DF); 16 Alessandro La Verghetta (FW)/(MF); 21 Christian Tsangas (GK)	1 Antonio Jesus Dominguez Galvan (GK); 2 Ruben Madrid Gomez (DF)/(MF); 3 Santiago Macia Rovira (MF); 4 Daniel Manjon Gomez (DF)/(MF); 5 Noe Adell Pla (DF)/(MF); 6 Pol Aguilar Diaz (DF)/(MF); 7 Sergio Nicolas Clemente Munoz (MF); 8 Aitor Arino Casoliba (FW)/(MF); 9 Jose Manuel Gomez Suarez (MF); 10 Eduardo De Laorden Barcelona (MF); 11 Daniel Zancajo Alejandre (FW)/(MF); 12 Jaume Almenar Avino (MF); 13 Francisco jose Martin Gutierrez (GK); 14 Felipe Maravall Calvo (DF)/(MF)

Group B

Portugal	Venezuela	(South Korea) Korea
1 Rui Rocha (GK); 2 Ricardo Franca (DF)/(MF); 3 Hugo Pinheiro (MF); 4 Vasco Santos (DF); 5 Ruben Oliveira (DF); 6 Luis Miguel Leal Ferreira (DF); 7 Vitor Vilarinho (DF)/(MF); 8 Pedro Santos (DF)/(MF); 9 Rui Goncalves (DF)/(MF); 10 Tiago Ramos (FW); 11 Jesus Barbosa (FW); 12 Nuno Bogas (DF); 13 Lucas Pinheiro (MF); 14 Telmo Baptista Tab (GK)	1 Alexandre Bello Marlon; 2 Daniel Enrique Sanchez; 3 Jose Luis Felipe Quintana; 4 Asdrubal Eusebio De Jesus Oliveros Mora; 5 Anderson Alberto Morantes Ramirez; 6 Richard Alexandre Mogollon Melendez; 7 Peter Antony Alvarado Gonzalez; 8 Jessi Junior Yari Villegas; 9 Angel Evelio Molina Gamacho; 10 Frank Rene Pineda Teran; 11 Saul Eliecer Torres Villegas; 12 Gabirel Antonio Bravo Olivi; 13 Gabriel Alfredo Medina; 14 Cristian Sneider Moreno Perez	1 Jungdeuk Park (GK); 2 Kinam Kim (DF); 3 Sangyul Kim (DF); 4 Gyujeong Sim (FW)/(MF); 5 Phillip Jung (FW); 6 Beomjun Choi (DF)/(MF); 7 Hunju Lee (DF); 8 Junchul Shin (DF)/(MF); 9 Chiyoon Heo (DF); 10 Junho Jang (DF); 11 Dongu Lee (FW); 12 Suam Park (DF); 13 Haecheol Park (FW); 14 Seunghwan Lee (FW)

Group C

Iran	Northern Ireland	Germany
1 Moslem Khazaeipirsarabi (GK); 2 Hamid Fathinezhad Jouryabi (DF)/(MF); 4 Hassan Safari (DF); 5 Sadegh Hassani Baghi (MF); 6 Amir Amjadian (DF)/(MF); 7 Behnam Sohrabi (FW); 8 Hossein Tiz Bor (DF)/(MF); 9 Mehdi Jamali (FW); 10 Jasem Bakhshi (FW); 11 Ehsan Masoumzadeh (MF); 12 Naser Akbarpour Kalankalayeh (DF); 13 Lotfollah Jangjou (DF); 17 Mohammed Kharat (DF); 22 Babak Safarikourabbasloo (GK)	1 Paul Cassidy (GK); 2 Christian Canning (DF); 3 Jordan Cush (DF); 4 Cormac Birt (MF); 5 James Holden (DF)/(MF); 6 Charlie Fogarty (MF); 7 David Leavy (MF); 8 Ryan Walker (FW); 9 Conor Lewsley (FW); 10 Jordan Walker (FW)/(MF); 11 Harry Cheeseman (FW); 13 Sean Kemp (DF)/(MF); 14 Josh Harwood (DF)	1 Rene Heinen (GK); 2 Luca Podsendek (MF); 3 Robin Meyer (MF); 4 Fabian Oliesch (DF)/(MF); 5 Rene Schramm (DF); 6 Frederic Heinze (DF); 7 Gordon Litinski (DF)/(MF); 8 Marco Geisler (FW); 9 Phillipp Freudinger (DF)/(MF); 10 Jörn Lorenzen (FW)/(MF); 11 Pritpal Singh (DF)/(MF); 12 Lars Nehrenheim (GK); 13 Maik Puschmann (DF); 14 Conny Fritsch (DF)

Group D

Canada	Japan	Finland	Denmark
1 Damien Wojtiw (GK); 2 Liam Stanley (MF); 3 Dan Benoit (DF); 4 Raji Kamoun (FW); 5 Samuel Charron (MF); 6 Jamie Ackinclose (MF); 7 Dustin Hodgson (DF); 8 Vito Proietti (FW); 9 Lucas Bruno (FW); 10 Duncan McDonald (MF); 11 Matt Brown (DF); 12 Nic Heffernan (DF); 13 Chris Fawcett (DF)/(MF); 14 Sam Denton (GK)	1 Hideyuki Yanagi; 2 Kodai Nakaoka; 3 Shou Kuroda; 4 Hiroto Takahashi; 5 Taisei Taniguchi; 6 Ryosuke Miura; 7 Tomohisa Ohno; 8 Shotaro Osawa; 9 Tetsuya Toda; 10 Temma Inoue; 11 Tatsuhiro Ura; 12 Kazuma Hanaki; 14 Kuniaki Yoshioka	1 Jaakko Sepalla (GK); 3 Wiljami Laurila (DF); 4 Simo Mykkanen (DF); 8 Mikael Jukarainen (DF); 9 Janne Helander (FW); 10 Johannes Siikonen (FW); 12 Otto Kaipainen (DF); 13 Tomi Petteri Heikkila (DF); 15 Samuel Taipale (FW); 16 Joni Berg (FW); 17 Juho Ovaska (GK); 20 Ville Kuronen (FW)	1 Mads Tofte (GK); 2 Kristoffer Nielsen (DF)/(FW); 3 Bastian Wendel Carlsen (FW)/(MF); 5 Per Mørch (DF); 6 Peter Hansen (DF); 7 Glenn Sambleben (DF); 8 Claus Pape (FW); 9 Victor Sørensen (FW); 10 Noa Bak-Pedersen(DF); 11 Martin Wolf (DF)/(MF); 12 Oliver Larsen (MF); 16 Magnus Hytholm Strand(DF); 22 Rasmus Jørgensen (GK); 83 Emil Møller (MF)

== Venues ==
The venues to be used for the World Championships were located in Vejen.

Vejen	2016 IFCPF World Championships Qualification Tournament is located in Denmark
Stadium: Vejen Idrætscenter	2016 IFCPF World Championships Qualification Tournament is located in Denmark
Capacity: unknown	2016 IFCPF World Championships Qualification Tournament is located in Denmark

== Format ==
The first round, or group stage, was a competition between the 13 teams divided among three groups of three and one group of four, where each group engaged in a round-robin tournament within itself. The two highest ranked teams in each group advanced to the knockout stage for the position one to eight. the two lower ranked teams plays for the positions nine to thirteen. Teams were awarded three points for a win and one for a draw. When comparing teams in a group over-all result came before head-to-head.

Tie-breaking criteria for group play
The ranking of teams in each group was based on the following criteria:
1. Number of points
2. Goal difference
3. Number of goals scored
4. Number of points obtained in matches between tied teams
5. Goal difference in matches between tied teams
6. Number of goals scored in matches between tied teams
7. Drawing of lots

In the knockout stage there were three rounds (quarter-finals, semi-finals, and the final). The winners plays for the higher positions, the losers for the lower positions. For any match in the knockout stage, a draw after 60 minutes of regulation time was followed by two 10 minute periods of extra time to determine a winner. If the teams were still tied, a penalty shoot-out was held to determine a winner.

Classification
Athletes with a physical disability competed. The athlete's disability was caused by a non-progressive brain damage that affects motor control, such as cerebral palsy, traumatic brain injury or stroke. Athletes must be ambulant.

Players were classified by level of disability.

- C5: Athletes with difficulties when walking and running, but not in standing or when kicking the ball.
- C6: Athletes with control and co-ordination problems of their upper limbs, especially when running.
- C7: Athletes with hemiplegia.
- C8: Athletes with minimal disability; must meet eligibility criteria and have an impairment that has impact on the sport of football.

Teams must field at least one class C5 or C6 player at all times. No more than two players of class C8 are permitted to play at the same time.

== Group stage ==
The first round, or group stage, have seen the sixteen teams divided into four groups of four teams. In any every match a maximum of 10 goals scored were counted. This is indicated with an asterisk (*).

=== Group A ===
Pos	Team	Pld	W	D	L	GF	GA	GD	Pts	Qualified for
1	Scotland	2	2	0	0	7	0	+7	6	Team play for the position 1 - 8
2	Australia	2	1	0	1	2	2	0	3	Team play for the position 1 - 8
3	Spain	2	0	0	2	0	7	−7	0	Team play for the position 9 - 13

Rules for classification: Tie-breaking criteria
30 July 2016
13:30

Scotland	5–0	Spain
Stewart 6', 36'; Adell Pla 16' (o.g.); Hannin 40'; McGregor 50'	Report

Vejen Idrætscenter, Field 2
Referee: Skye Arthur Banning
31 July 2016
15:00

Spain	0–2	Australia
	Report	Kinner 18'; Roche 41'

Vejen Idrætscenter, Field 1
Referee: Ross Haswell
1 August 2016
17:00

Australia	0–2	Scotland
	Report	McGregor 9'; Hannin 44'

Vejen Idrætscenter, Field 2
Referee: Garry Polkey

=== Group B ===
Pos	Team	Pld	W	D	L	GF	GA	GD	Pts	Qualified for
1	Portugal	2	1	1	0	3	0	+3	4	Team play for the position 1 - 8
2	Venezuela	2	1	1	0	2	1	+1	4	Team play for the position 1 - 8
3	(South Korea) Korea	2	0	0	2	1	5	−4	0	Team play for the position 9 - 13

Rules for classification: Tie-breaking criteria
30 July 2016
11:30

Portugal	3–0	(South Korea) Korea
Vilarinho 11'; Ramos 45'; P. Santos 47'	Report

Vejen Idrætscenter, Field 2
Referee: Ross Haswell
31 July 2016
13:30

(South Korea) Korea	1–2	Venezuela
S. Lee 26'	Report	Yari Villegas 18'; Morantes Ramirez 60'

Vejen Idrætscenter, Field 2
Referee: Carlos Dias
1 August 2016
15:00

Venezuela	0–0	Portugal
	Report

Vejen Idrætscenter, Field 1
Referee: Christian Clausen

=== Group C ===
Pos	Team	Pld	W	D	L	GF	GA	GD	Pts	Qualified for
1	Iran	2	2	0	0	15	3	+12	6	Team play for the position 1 - 8
2	Northern Ireland	2	1	0	1	8	8	0	3	Team play for the position 1 - 8
3	Germany	2	0	0	2	1	13	−12	0	Team play for the position 9 - 13

Source: 2016 IFCPF World Championships Qualification Tournament - Vejen 2016
Rules for classification: Tie-breaking criteria
30 July 2016
9:30

Iran	7–1	Germany
Jamali 8', 23', 36', 38'; Bakhshi 9', 22'; Hassani Baghi 35'	Report	Jangjou 30' (o.g.)

Vejen Idrætscenter, Field 1
Referee: Garry Polkey
31 July 2016
11:30

Germany	0–6	Northern Ireland
	Report	Lewsley 15', 22', 37'; Leavy 21', 24'; Cheeseman 58'

Vejen Idrætscenter, Field 1
Referee: Skye Arthur Banning
1 August 2016
15:00

Northern Ireland	2–7	Iran
Leavy 40'; Lewsley 44'	Report	Jamali 6', 49', 60'; Hassani Baghi 13'; Masoumzadeh 31', 41', 52'

Vejen Idrætscenter, Field 2
Referee: Ross Haswell

=== Group D ===
Pos	Team	Pld	W	D	L	GF	GA	GD	Pts	Qualified for
1	Canada	3	3	0	0	27	0	+27	9	Team play for the position 1 - 8
2	Japan	3	2	0	1	6	9	−3	6	Team play for the position 1 - 8
3	Denmark	3	1	0	2	3	13	−10	3	Team play for the position 9 - 13
4	Finland	3	0	0	3	2	16	−14	0	Team play for the position 9 - 13

Source: 2016 IFCPF World Championships Qualification Tournament - Vejen 2016
Rules for classification: Tie-breaking criteria
29 July 2016
16:00

Denmark	0–10	Canada
	Report	Ackinclos 2', 27'; Brown 7'; Stanley 15'; Charron 19', 30', 60'; Heffernan 43'; Bruno 47', 50'

Vejen Idrætscenter, Field 1
Referee: Garry Polkey
29. July 2016
18:00

Japan	4–1	Finland
Toda 4'; Ura 16'; Mykkanen 42' (o.g.); Inoue 58'	Report	Helander 39'

Vejen Idrætscenter, Field 1
Referee: Skye Arthur Banning
30 July 2016
16:00

Denmark	1–2	Japan
Wolf 23'	Report	Ura 32'; Taniguchi 58'

Vejen Idrætscenter, Field 1
Referee: Carlos Dias
30 July 2016
18:00

Canada	10–0	Finland
Charron 3', 23', 59'; Stanley 6', 30', 37'; Brown 13', 16', 18'; Kamoun 46'	Report

Vejen Idrætscenter, Field 1
Referee: Martin Outzen
1 August 2016
11:30

Finland	1–2	Denmark
Helander 46'	Report	Hansen 40'; Wolf 53'

Vejen Idrætscenter, Field 1
Referee: Skye Arthur Banning
1 August 2016
11:30

Canada	7–0	Japan
Stanley 10', 41'; Charron 11', 13', 36', 38'; Proietti 53'	Report

Vejen Idrætscenter, Field 2
Referee: Carlos Dias

== Knockout stage ==
=== Quarter-finals ===
Position 1-8

3 August 2016
13:30

Scotland	4–0	Northern Ireland
Stewart 4', 5', 13'; Paterson 59'	Report

Vejen Idrætscenter, Field 1
Referee: Bjarke Bruun

3 August 2016
15:00

Iran	6–0	Australia
Tiz Bor 4', 10', 23', 36'; Jamali 9'; Amjadian 60'	Report

Vejen Idrætscenter, Field 2
Referee: Ross Haswell

3 August 2016
17:00

Portugal	3–2	Japan
Leal Ferreira 9'; P. Santos 46'; H. Pinheiro 58'	Report	Taniguchi 4'; Toda 51'

Vejen Idrætscenter, Field 1
Referee: Martin Outzen

3 August 2016
19:00

Canada	1–1 (a.e.t.)	Venezuela
Charron 7'	Report	Quintana 20'
Penalties
Stanley (penalty scored) (penalty missed) (penalty missed); Proietti (penalty scored) (penalty missed)	(2–3p)	Quintana (penalty scored) (penalty missed); Olivares Mora (penalty scored) (penalty missed); Mogollon Melendez (penalty scored)

Vejen Idrætscenter, Field 2
Referee: Garry Polkey

=== Semi-finals ===
Position 5-8

4 August 2016
13:30

Northern Ireland	3–2	Canada
Leavy 16'; Lewsley 50', 75'	Report	Charron 12', 41'

Vejen Idrætscenter, Field 2
Referee: Carlos Dias

4 August 2016
15:00

Australia	2–0	Japan
Kinner 11'; Atkins 54'	Report

Vejen Idrætscenter, Field 1
Referee: Carlos Dias

Position 1-4

4 August 2016
17:00

Scotland	6–0	Venezuela
Paton 7', 17'; Stewart 10', 22'; Paterson 24'; Martin 48'	Report

Vejen Idrætscenter, Field 2
Referee: Garry Polkey

4 August 2016
19:00

Iran	5–1	Portugal
Jamali 4', 5', 15'; Amjadian 6', 52'	Report	Vilarinho 27'

Vejen Idrætscenter, Field 1
Referee: Ross Haswell

== Finals ==
=== Group stage 9-13 ===
position 9-13

Pos	Team	Pld	W	D	L	GF	GA	GD	Pts	Qualified for
1	Spain	4	3	1	0	11	2	+9	10	position 9
2	Germany	4	2	2	0	14	8	+6	8	position 10
3	Denmark	4	2	0	2	6	9	−3	6	position 11
4	(South Korea) Korea	4	0	2	2	4	9	−5	2	position 12
5	Finland	4	0	1	3	6	13	−7	1	position 13

Source: 2016 IFCPF World Championships Qualification Tournament - Vejen 2016
Rules for classification: Tie-breaking criteria

The match from the group stage Finland against Denmark (1–2) was included in the table.

2 August 2016
9:30

Germany	6–3	Denmark
Fritsch 14', 15', 20', 56'; Meyer 29'; Geisler 34'	Report	Larsen 53'; Hansen 60'; Møller 60'

Vejen Idrætscenter, Field 1
Referee: Skye Arthur Banning
2 August 2016
11:30

Spain	4–0	(South Korea) Korea
Arino Casoliba 10', 13', 58'; Munoz 53'	Report

Vejen Idrætscenter, Field 1
Referee: Ross Haswell
3 August 2016
9:30

Finland	2–5	Germany
Siikonen 15'; Kuronen 29'	Report	Fritsch 31', 34', 57'; Meyer 35'; Freudinger 46'

Vejen Idrætscenter, Field 1
Referee: Christian Clausen
3 August 2016
11:30

Denmark	1–0	(South Korea) Korea
S. Kim 30' (o.g.)	Report

Vejen Idrætscenter, Field 1
Referee: Christian Clausen
4 August 2016
9:30

Germany	1–1	Spain
Geisler 27'	Report	Adell Pla 37'

Vejen Idrætscenter, Field 1
Referee: Carlos Dias
4 August 2016
11:30

(South Korea) Korea	2–2	Finland
Choi 9', 15'	Report	Helander 7'; Laurila 55'

Vejen Idrætscenter, Field 2
Referee: Lars Toldbod
5 August 2016
11:30

Spain	2–0	Denmark
Munoz 3', 33'	Report

Vejen Idrætscenter, Field 1
Referee: Garry Polkey
5 August 2016
13:30

(South Korea) Korea	2–2	Germany
H. Park 51'; Freudinger 44' (o.g.)	Report	Freudinger 25', 33'

Vejen Idrætscenter, Field 1
Referee: Carlos Dias
6 August 2016
9:30

Finland	1–4	Spain
Jukarainen 8'	Report	Arino Casoliba 7', 57'; De Laorden Barcelona 18'; Munoz 54'

Vejen Idrætscenter, Field 2
Referee: Christian Clausen

=== Finals 1-8 ===
Position 7-8

6 August 2016
9:30

Canada	5–0	Japan
Stanley 15', 36'; Charron 38', 59'; Brown 51'	Report

Vejen Idrætscenter, Field 1
Referee: Ross Haswell

Position 5-6

6 August 2016
11:30

Northern Ireland	2–0	Australia
Birt 5'; J. Walker 29'	Report

Vejen Idrætscenter, Field 2
Referee: Garry Polkey

Position 3-4

6 August 2016
13:30

Venezuela	2–1	Portugal
Yari Villegas 52', 58'	Report	Vilarinho 56'

Vejen Idrætscenter, Field 1
Referee: unknown

Final

6 August 2016
16:00

Scotland	0–4	Iran
	Report	Bakhshi 19', 58'; Jamali 32'; Masoumzadeh 60'

Vejen Idrætscenter, Field 1
Referee: Carlos Dias

== Statistics ==
=== Goalscorers ===
15 goals

- (Canada) Samuel Charron

12 goals

- (Iran) Mehdi Jamali

8 goals

- (Canada) Liam Stanley

7 goals

- (Germany) Conny Fritsch
- (Scotland) Sean Stewart

6 goals

- (Northern Ireland) Conor Lewsley

5 goals

- (Spain) Aitor Arino Casoliba
- (Canada) Matt Brown

4 goals

- (Iran) Jasem Bakhshi
- (Northern Ireland) David Leavy
- (Iran) Ehsan Masoumzadeh
- (Spain) Sergio Nicolas Clemente Munoz
- (Iran) Hossein Tiz Bor

3 goals

- (Iran) Amir Amjadian
- (Germany) Phillipp Freudinger
- (Finland) Janne Helander
- (Portugal) Vitor Vilarinho
- (Venezuela) Jessi Junior Yari Villegas

2 goals

- (Canada) Jamie Ackinclose
- (Canada) Lucas Bruno
- (South Korea) Beomjun Choi
- (Germany) Marco Geisler
- (Scotland) Kyle Hannin
- (Denmark) Peter Hansen
- (Iran) Sadegh Hassani Baghi
- (Australia) Ryan Kinner
- (Scotland) Blair McGregor
- (Germany) Robin Meyer
- (Scotland) Jonathan Paterson
- (Scotland) Ian Paton
- (Portugal) Pedro Santos
- (Japan) Taisei Taniguchi
- (Japan) Tetsuya Toda
- (Japan) Tatsuhiro Ura
- (Denmark) Martin Wolf

1 goal

- (Spain) Noe Adell Pla
- (Australia) Ben Atkins
- (Northern Ireland) Cormac Birt
- (Northern Ireland) Harry Cheeseman
- (Spain) Eduardo De Laorden Barcelona
- (Canada) Nic Heffernan
- (Japan) Temma Inoue
- (Finland) Mikael Jukarainen
- (Canada) Raji Kamoun
- (Finland) Ville Kuronen
- (Denmark) Oliver Larsen
- (Finland) Wiljami Laurila
- (Portugal) Luis Miguel Leal Ferreira
- (Scotland) Kieran Martin
- (Canada) Emil Møller
- (Venezuela) Anderson Alberto Morantes Ramirez
- (South Korea) Haecheol Park
- (Portugal) Hugo Pinheiro
- (Canada) Vito Proietti
- (Venezuela) Jose Luis Felipe Quintana
- (Portugal) Tiago Ramos
- (Australia) Benjamin Roche
- (South Korea) Seunghwan Lee
- (Finland) Johannes Siikonen
- (Northern Ireland) Jordan Walker

own goals

- (Spain) Noe Adell Pla
- (Germany) Phillipp Freudinger
- (Germany) Lotfollah Jangjou
- (South Korea) Sangyul Kim
- (Finland) Simo Mykkanen

=== Ranking ===
Rank	Qualified 2017 WC	Team
1.	Q	Iran
2.		Scotland
3.	Q	Venezuela
4.	Q	Portugal
5.	Q	Northern Ireland
6.	Q	Australia
7.	Q	Canada
8.	Q	Japan
9.	Q	Spain
10.		Germany
11.		Denmark
12.		(South Korea) Korea
13.		Finland
