= Football World Championship Under 19 at the 2015 CPISRA World Games =

IFCPF CP Football World Championships Under 19 at the 2015 CPISRA World Games
Tournament details
- Host country: England
- Dates: 10 – 16 August 2016
- Teams: 7
- Venue: 1 (in 1 host city)

Final positions
- Champions: Russia
- Runners-up: Brazil
- Third place: England
- Fourth place: Scotland

Tournament statistics
- Matches played: 15
- Goals scored: 99 (6.6 per match)
- Top scorer(s): (Brazil) Hudson Hyure Do Carmo Januario (7) (England) Dale Smith (7)

The Football World Championship Under 19 at the 2015 CPISRA World Games was the world championship for men's national 7-a-side association football under 19 teams. IFCPF stands for International Federation of Cerebral Palsy Football. Athletes with a physical disability competed. The Championship took place in the England from 10 to 16 August 2015. Football CP Football was played with modified FIFA rules. Among the modifications were that there were seven players, no offside, a smaller playing field, and permission for one-handed throw-ins. Matches consisted of two thirty-minute halves, with a fifteen-minute half-time break.

== Participating teams and officials ==
=== Qualifying ===
Continental	Berths	Qualified
Host nation	1	England U19
America	1	Brazil U19
Asia	1	Japan U19
Europe	3	Netherlands U19; Russia U19; Scotland U19
Pacific	1	Australia U19
Total	7	

=== The draw ===
During the draw, the teams were divided into pots because of rankings. Here, the following groups:

	Group A	Group B
Pot 1	Russia U19 (2.)	Brazil U19 (3.)
Pot 2	Scotland U19 (9.)	Netherlands U19 (4.)
Pot 3	Australia U19 (14.)	Japan U19 (16.)
no Pot		England U19 (7.)

=== Squads ===
Group A

Russia U19	Scotland U19	Australia U19
3 Danila Belov; 6 Nikolai Maksimov; 7 Pavel Proshin; 8 Aslan Tibilov; 9 Tahir Boboev; 10 Alexei Borkin; 12 Guram Chkareuli (GK); 13 Soslan Dzugkoev; 14 Sergei Materukhin; 15 Alexandr Lipin (c); 17 Maksim Mikheev; 18 Soslan Gazdanov Coach: Avtandil Baramidze	4 Lewis McIntyre (c); 5 Ross Paterson; 6 Ian Paton; 7 Declan Docherty; 8 Robert Miller; 9 Kyle Hannin; 10 Jamie Mitchell; 11 Barry Halloran (GK); 12 Cameron Connor; 13 Jason Macleary; 14 Darren Aitken; 15 Darren Bowman Coach: Gary MacDonald	2 Robert Christie; 3 Gordon Allan; 6 Jack Starkey; 7 Taylor Harvey; 8 Nicholas Prescott; 9 Harrison Dowdell; 10 Matthew Hearne; 11 Shaun McCann; 12 Zachary Jones; 13 Nelson Gray; 15 Hayden Bognar; 16 Ryan Kinner (c); 19 Christian Tsangas (GK); Coach: Goran Stajic

Group B

Brazil U19	Netherlands U19	Japan U19	England U19
1 Diego Amado Fabricio (GK); 2 Bruno Rodrigues Da Silva (MF); 3 Bruno Pratis Da Silva (MF); 4 Weslley De Souza Mendes (FW); 5 Hudson Hyure Do Carmo Januario (MF); 6 Igor Romero Da Rocha (MF); 7 Diego Delgado Da Silva (c) (DF); 8 Joao Victor Batista Cortes (DF); 9 Gabriel Da Silva Araujo (MF); 10 Alesson De Oliveira Silva (FW); 12 Pedro Henrique Seabra Vaz (GK); 13 Matheus Henrique Rosa Xilaves (DF) Coach: Rodrigo Terra Cardoso	1 Stefan Boersma (c) (GK); 2 Roy Flier (DF); 3 Martijn Loeffen (DF); 4 Jeroen Duin (DF); 5 Nathan Janssen (MF); 6 Teddy Witjes (MF); 7 Krist Stoelwinder (MF); 8 Gerard Bambacht (MF); 9 Job Draaijers (FW); 10 Harm Pannerman (MF); 11 Malik De La Cruz Victoria (MF); 12 Danny Van Amerongen (FW); 14 Martijn Langras (DF) Coach: Rene Jurrius	1 Itta Ninomiya (GK); 7 Yuki Taniguci (MF); 8 Motoma Murachi (DF); 9 Temma Inoue (MF); 10 Tatsuhiro Ura (c) (DF); 11 Yasushi Narumi (MF); 12 Masaya Morita (DF); 14 Tomoya Fukushima (DF); 16 Yoshihiro Fukuda (DF); 18 Kazuma Hanaki (MF) Coach: Jin Yukio	1 Giles Moore (GK); 2 Harry Baker (c) (DF); 3 Will Boucher (DF); 4 Bailey Fleming (DF) / (MF); 5 Joel Athey (DF) / (MF); 6 Dale Smith (MF); 7 Connor Rawlins (MF); 8 Jordan Twiss (MF); 9 Hayden Kroll (MF)/(MF); 10 Oliver Nugent (MF) / (FW); 11 Reiss Blackwell (MF); 12 William Ling (FW); 13 Reagan Macmillan (GK); 14 Reece Macmillan (MF) / (FW); Coach: Lynton Lynch

== Venues ==
The venues to be used for the World Championships were located in Nottingham.

Nottingham	Football World Championship Under 19 at the 2015 CPISRA World Games is located in England
Highfields Playing Fields	Football World Championship Under 19 at the 2015 CPISRA World Games is located in England
Capacity: unknown	Football World Championship Under 19 at the 2015 CPISRA World Games is located in England

== Format ==
The first round, or group stage, was a competition between the 16 teams divided among four groups of four, where each group engaged in a round-robin tournament within itself. The two highest ranked teams in each group advanced to the knockout stage for the position one to sixteen. the two lower ranked teams plays for the positions 17 to 32. Teams were awarded three points for a win and one for a draw. When comparing teams in a group over-all result came before head-to-head.

Tie-breaking criteria for group play
The ranking of teams in each group was based on the following criteria:
1. Number of points
2. Goal difference
3. Number of goals scored
4. Number of points obtained in matches between tied teams
5. Goal difference in matches between tied teams
6. Number of goals scored in matches between tied teams
7. Drawing of lots

In the knockout stage there were three rounds (quarter-finals, semi-finals, and the final). The winners plays for the higher positions, the losers for the lower positions. For any match in the knockout stage, a draw after 60 minutes of regulation time was followed by two 10 minute periods of extra time to determine a winner. If the teams were still tied, a penalty shoot-out was held to determine a winner.

Classification
Athletes with a physical disability competed. The athlete's disability was caused by a non-progressive brain damage that affects motor control, such as cerebral palsy, traumatic brain injury or stroke. Athletes must be ambulant.

Players were classified by level of disability.

- C5: Athletes with difficulties when walking and running, but not in standing or when kicking the ball.
- C6: Athletes with control and co-ordination problems of their upper limbs, especially when running.
- C7: Athletes with hemiplegia.
- C8: Athletes with minimal disability; must meet eligibility criteria and have an impairment that has impact on the sport of football.

Teams must field at least one class C5 or C6 player at all times. No more than two players of class C8 are permitted to play at the same time.

== Group stage ==
The first round, or group stage, have seen the sixteen teams divided into four groups of four teams.

=== Group A ===
Pos	Team	Pld	W	D	L	GF	GA	GD	Pts	Qualified for
1	Russia U19	2	2	0	0	9	1	+8	6	Team play for the position 1 - 4
2	Scotland U19	2	1	0	1	9	5	+4	3	Team play for the position 1 - 4
3	Australia U19	3	0	0	3	0	12	−12	0	Team play for the position 5 - 7

Source: Football World Championship Under 19 at the 2015 CPISRA World Games
Rules for classification: Tie-breaking criteria
10 August 2015
15:00

Russia U19	5–1	Scotland U19
Borkin 33', 46'; Gazdanov 49'; Materukhin 52' (pen.); Belov 60+2'	Report	Hannin 50'

Highfields Playing Fields
11 August 2015
15:00

Scotland U19	8–0	Australia U19
Aitken 15'; Mitchell 24' (pen.); Paton 30+1'; Hannin 32', 45', 47'; McIntyre 53'; Docherty 57'	Report

Highfields Playing Fields
12 August 2015
15:00

Russia U19	4–0	Australia U19
Gazdanov 3'; Tibilov 18', 19'; Lipin 38'	Report

Highfields Playing Fields

=== Group B ===
Pos	Team	Pld	W	D	L	GF	GA	GD	Pts	Qualified for
1	Brazil U19	3	3	0	0	23	1	+22	9	Team play for the position 1 - 4
2	England U19	3	2	0	1	17	3	+14	6	Team play for the position 1 - 4
3	Netherlands U19	3	1	0	2	9	9	0	3	Team play for the position 5 - 7
4	Japan U19	3	0	0	3	1	37	−36	0	Team play for the position 5 - 7

Source: Football World Championship Under 19 at the 2015 CPISRA World Games
Rules for classification: Tie-breaking criteria
10 August 2015
11:00

England U19	2–0	Netherlands U19
Smith 34'; Nugent 50'	Report

Highfields Playing Fields
10 August 2015
13:00

Japan U19	1–13	Brazil U19
Inoue 59'	Report	Do Carmo Januario 7', 36', 37'; Romero Da Rocha 8', 33'; De Oliveira Silva 24', 35', 42'; De Souza Mendes 39', 45', 54'; Rodrigues Da Silva 42'; Batista Cortes 60'

Highfields Playing Fields
11 August 2015
11:00

England U19	15–0	Japan U19
Smith 8', 11', 24', 26', 37'; Nugent 9', 14', 21'; Blackwell 17', 20'; Reece Macmillan 30', 36', 43'; Kroll 47'; Athey 57'	Report

Highfields Playing Fields
11 August 2015
13:00

Netherlands U19	0–7	Brazil U19
	Report	Romero Da Rocha 2'; Pratis Da Silva 9'; De Oliveira Silva 14'; Do Carmo Januario 16', 30', 37'; Duin 47' (o.g.)

Highfields Playing Fields
12 August 2015
11:00

Japan U19	0–9	Netherlands U19
	Report	Bambacht 14', 43'; Draaijers 23', 36'; De La Cruz Victoria 27', 48'; Pannerman 49'; Stoelwinder 56'; Langras 60'

Highfields Playing Fields
12 August 2015
13:00

England U19	0–3	Brazil U19
	Report	Pratis Da Silva 30+2'; De Souza Mendes 60+4', 60+7'

Highfields Playing Fields

== Knockout stage ==
=== Semi-finals ===
Position 5-7

13 August 2015
11:00

Japan U19	3–6	Australia U19
Ura 32', 46'; Inoue 34'	Report	Hearne 13', 16', 20', 21'; Kinner 23'; Allan 38'

Highfields Playing Fields

Position 1-4

13 August 2015
13:00

Brazil U19	3–1 (a.e.t.)	Scotland U19
Do Carmo Januario 36'; Rodrigues Da Silva 67'; Romero Da Rocha 75'	Report	Mitchell 41'

Highfields Playing Fields

13 August 2015
15:00

Russia U19	4–0	England U19
Materukhin 14', 44', 45', 54'	Report

Highfields Playing Fields

== Finals ==
Position 5-7

15 August 2015
11:00

Australia U19	1–5	Netherlands U19
Dowdell 29'	Report	Stoelwinder 5', 36'; Pannerman 9', 11'; Draaijers 15'

Highfields Playing Fields

Position 3-4

15 August 2015
13:00

Scotland U19	1–2	England U19
Miller 14'	Report	Nugent 1'; Smith 60'

Highfields Playing Fields

Final

15 August 2015
15:00

Brazil U19	2–3	Russia U19
Romero Da Rocha 5'; De Souza Mendes 51'	Report	Gazdanov 5', 41', 43'

Highfields Playing Fields

== Statistics ==
=== Goalscorers ===
7 goals

- (Brazil) Hudson Hyure Do Carmo Januario
- (England) Dale Smith

6 goals

- (Brazil) Weslley De Souza Mendes

5 goals

- (Russia) Soslan Gazdanov
- (Russia) Sergei Materukhin
- (England) Oliver Nugent
- (Brazil) Igor Romero Da Rocha

4 goals

- (Brazil) Alesson De Oliveira Silva
- (Scotland) Kyle Hannin
- (Australia) Matthew Hearne

3 goals

- (Netherlands) Job Draaijers
- (Netherlands) Harm Pannerman
- (England) Reece Macmillan
- (Netherlands) Krist Stoelwinder

2 goals

- (Netherlands) Gerard Bambacht
- (England) Reiss Blackwell
- (Russia) Alexei Borkin
- (Netherlands) Malik De La Cruz Victoria
- (Japan) Temma Inoue
- (Scotland) Jamie Mitchell
- (Brazil) Bruno Pratis Da Silva
- (Brazil) Bruno Rodrigues Da Silva
- (Russia) Aslan Tibilov
- (Japan) Tatsuhiro Ura

1 goal

- (Scotland) Darren Aitken
- (Australia) Gordon Allan
- (England) Joel Athey
- (Brazil) Joao Victor Batista Cortes
- (Russia) Danila Belov
- (Scotland) Declan Docherty
- (Australia) Harrison Dowdell
- (Australia) Ryan Kinner
- (England) Hayden Kroll
- (Netherlands) Martijn Langras
- (Russia) Alexandr Lipin
- (Scotland) Lewis McIntyre
- (Scotland) Robert Miller
- (Scotland) Ian Paton

own goal

- (Netherlands) Jeroen Duin

=== Ranking ===
Rank	Team
Gold medal	Russia U19
Silver medal	Brazil U19
Bronze medal	England U19
4.	Scotland U19
5.	Netherlands U19
6.	Australia U19
7.	Japan U19
