= 2017 IFCPF CP Football World Championships =

Tournament details
- Host country: Argentina
- Dates: 4 – 24 September 2017
- Teams: 16
- Venue(s): 1 (in 1 host city)

Final positions
- Champions: Ukraine
- Runners-up: Iran
- Third place: Russia
- Fourth place: England

Tournament statistics
- Matches played: 48
- Goals scored: 217 (4.52 per match)
- Top scorer(s): (Republic of Ireland) Dillon Sheridan (10)

The 2017 IFCPF CP Football World Championships was the world championship for men's national 7-a-side association football teams. IFCPF stands for International Federation of Cerebral Palsy Football. Athletes competed with a physical disability. The Championship took place in the Argentina from 4 to 24 September 2017.

Football CP Football was played with modified FIFA rules. Among the modifications there were seven players, no offside, a smaller playing field, and permission for one-handed throw-ins. Matches consisted of two thirty-minute halves, with a fifteen-minute half-time break. The Championships was a qualifying event for the 2019 IFCPF CP Football World Championships.

== Participating teams and officials ==
=== Qualifying ===
The following teams were qualified for the tournament:

Means of qualification	Date	Venue	Berths	Qualified
Host nation			1	Argentina
2015 World Championships	16 – 28 June 2015	Burton-upon-Trent, England	7	Brazil; England (Republic of Ireland) Ireland; Netherlands; Russia; Ukraine; United States
2016 World Championships Qualification Tournament	29 July – 6 August 2016	Vejen, Denmark	8	Australia; Canada; Iran; Japan; Northern Ireland; Portugal (Spain) Spain^{1} Venezuela
Total			16	

^{1} Scotland would be qualified as a second-placed team by the qualifying tournament for the World Cup. But they had to withdraw their participation. Thus, the nine-place team of the qualifying team, Spain, took part and took part in the world championship.

=== The draw ===
During the draw, the teams were divided into pots because of rankings. Here, the following groups:

	Group A	Group B	Group C	Group D
Pot 1	Brazil (2)	Argentina (4)	Netherlands (3)	Ukraine (1)
Pot 2	(Republic of Ireland) Ireland (5)	Russia (7)	England (8)	United States (6)
Pot 3	Canada (10)	Portugal (11)	Venezuela (12)	Northern Ireland (13)
Pot 4	Spain (22)	Iran (15)	Japan (14)	Australia (16)

=== Squads ===
Group A

Brazil	(Republic of Ireland) Ireland	Canada	Spain
1 Marcos Dos Santos Ferreira (GK); 2 Eduardo Felipe da Silva Martins; 3 Ewerton Rafael Machado de Matos; 4 Lucas Henrique da Silva; 5 Wesley Martins; 6 Leonardo Giovani Moraes; 7 Diego Delgado; 8 Evandro Oliveira Gomes De Oliveira; 9 Ubirajara Magalhães; 10 Wanderson Silva de Oliveira; 11 Jan da Costa; 12; 13 Bruno da Silva Ayva; 14 Adriano Costa Martins; Coach: Paulo Alberto Da Veiga	1 James Gerard Naughton (GK); 2 Thomas Maher; 3 Conor Tuite; 4 Oisin Gerard Merritt; 5 Aaron Tier; 6 Dylan Patrick O'Brien; 7 Gary Messett (c); 8 Mark Patrick Barry; 9 Ryan Nolan; 10 Dillon Sheridan; 11 Oluwatomiwa Henk Badun; 12 Peter Cotter; 13 Samson Paul Carroll; 14 Carl McKee; Coach: Paul Breen	1 Damien Wojtiw (GK); 2 Liam Stanley; 3 Dan Benoit; 4 Nicholas Heffernan; 5 Samuel Charron (c); 6 James Victor Ackinclose; 7 Dustin Hodgson; 8 Duncan McDonald; 9 Gaerrisen Freeland; 10 Zachary Gingras; 11 Raji Kamoun; 12 Joshua da Silva; 13 Cameron Ohanley; 14 Cuauhtemoc Flores; Coach: Drew Ferguson	1 Antonio Jesus Dominguez Galvan (GK); 2 Isaias Pacheco Fernandez; 3; 4 Daniel Manjon Gomez (c); 5 Alan Flores Pinto; 6 Pol Aguilar Diaz; 7 Santiago Macia Rovira; 8 Daniel Palau Ballester; 9 Jose Manuel Bueno Ruiz; 10 Jose Manuel Gomez Suarez; 11 Mario Fernandez Pardo; 12 Victor Rodriguez Dominguez; 13 Francisco Jose Martin Guiterrez (GK); 14 Jaume Almenar Avino; Coach: Jorge Peleteiro Rubio

Group B

Argentina	Russia	Portugal	Iran
1 Matias Salvat (GK); 2 Hernando German Romussi; 3 Maximiliano Fernandez; 4 Claudio Figuera (c); 5 Carlos Carrizo; 6 Mariano Cortes; 7 Rodrigo Lugrin; 8 Kevin Damian Bonomi; 9 Matiaz Fernadez; 10 Mariano Morana; 11 Duncan Coronel; 12 Gonzal Bacik (GK); 13 Juan Andrés Acevedo; 14 Matías Ezequiel Vera; Coach: Osvaldo Hernandez	1 Vladislav Raretskii (GK); 2 Danila Belov; 3 Aleksei Borkin; 4 Zaurbek Pagaev; 5 Viacheslav Larionov; 6 Aleksey Tumakov; 7 Marat Eloev; 8 Ivan Potekhin; 9 Dmitry Minenko; 10 Dmitrii Pestretsov; 11 Aleksandr Kuligin; 12 Guram Chkareuli (GK); 13 Lasha Murvanadze (c); 14 Georgiy Albegov; Coach: Avtandil Baramidze	1 Rui Rocha (GK); 2 Ivo Emanuel De Souza Correia; 3 Hugo Pinheiro; 4 Vasco Santos; 5 Ruben Miguel Sousa Oliveira; 6 Luís Miguel Leal Ferreira; 7 Vitor Vilarinho (c); 8 Pedro Santos; 9 Rui Diogo Ribeiro Gonçalves; 10 Tiago Ramos; 11 Jesus Leao Barbosa; 13 Lucas Pinheiro; 12 Cláudio Filipe Ferreira Nóvoa; 14 Telmo Baptista (GK); Coach: Vasco Santos Ferreira	1 Moslem Khazaeipirsarabi (GK); 2 Amir Amjadian; 3 Amirreza Ezzatdoust Sehsari; 4 Hassan Safari; 5; 6 Abbas Torabi; 7 Abdolreza Karimizadeh (c); 8 Hossein Tiz Bor; 9 Mehdi Jamali; 10 Jasem Bakhshi; 11 Ehsan Masoumzadeh; 12 Habibollah Heidari Mehr (GK); 13 Lotfollah Jangjou; 14 Mohsen Mokhtari; Coach: Amin Allah Mani

Group C

Netherlands	England	Venezuela	Japan
1 George van Altena; 2 Gerard Frederik Bambacht; 3 Myron Gebbink; 4 Jeroen Schuitert (c); 5 Teddy Witjes; 6 Malik Madiba de la Cruz Victoria; 7 Daan Dikken; 8 Guido Floors; 9 Jeroen Saedt; 10 Harm Panneman; 11 Rik Rodenburg; 12 Ramon Pater (GK); 13 Jeroen Duin; 14 Job Draaijers; Coach: Max Raeven	1 Giles Moore (GK); 2 Liam Roger Irons; 3 Harry Baker; 4 James Blackwell; 5 Emyle Rudder; 6 Matthew Anthony Crossen; 7 Michael Barker; 8 Jack Rutter; 9 David Porcher; 10 George Fletcher; 11 Oliver Nugent; 12 Dale Smith; 13 Ryan Kay; 14 Lewis Martin Tribe; Coach: Andrew Smith	1; 2 Stewart Xavier Ortiz Sira; 3; 4 Peter Alvarado Gonzales; 5 Daniel Sánchez; 6 Richard Mogollon Melendez; 7 Gabriel Antonio Bravo Olivi; 8 Asbrubal Olivares Mora (c); 9 Angel Molina Camacho; 10 Jessy Yari Villegas; 11 Saul Torres Villegas; 17 Jose Quintana; 18 Anderson Alberto Morantes Ramirez; 99 Frank Pineda Terán (GK); Coach: José Luis Betancor	1 Hideyuki Yanaghi; 2 Hisato Ozaki; 3 Shou Kuroda; 4; 5 Shotaro Osawa; 6 Tetsuya Toda; 7 Tomohisa Ono; 8 Hiroki Kameno; 9 Taisei Taniguchi; 10 Ryosuke Miura; 11 Tatsuhiro Ura; 12 Naoyoshi Kagayama (GK); 13 Kazuma Hanaki; 14; Coach: Junichi Sano

Group D

Ukraine	United States	Northern Ireland	Australia
1 Kostyantyn Symashko (GK); 2 Vitaliy Trushev; 3 Yevhen Zinoviev; 4 Taras Dutko; 5 Oleh Len; 6 Edhar Kahramanian; 7 Vitaliy Romanchuk; 8 Artem Sheremet; 9 Dmytro Molodtsov; 10 Stanislav Podolskyi; 11 Volodymyr Antoniuk (c); 12 Bohdan Kulynych (GK); 13 Artem Krasylnykov; 14 Ivan Shkvarlo; Coach: Serghii Ovcharenko	1 Sean Robert Boyle (GK); 2 Cameron DeLillo; 3 Gregory William Brigman; 4 Tyler Bennett; 5 Bryce Boarman; 6 Benjamin Lindau; 7 Adam Ballou; 8 Andrew Marten Bremer; 9 Seth Jahn; 10 Kevin Hensley (c); 11 Nicholas Mayhugh; 12 Marc Estrella (GK); 13 Mason Abbiate; 14 David Garza; Coach: Stuart Sharp	1 Paul Seamus Cassidy (GK); 2 Charlie Fogarty; 3 Christian Canning (GK); 4 Jordan Walker; 5 Cormac Birt; 6 Timothy William McClean; 7 David Leavy (c); 8 Sean Coyle; 9 Ryan Walker; 10; 11 Jordan Cush; 12; 13; 14 Ryan Jonathan Neill; Coach: Alan Crooks	1 Chris Barty (GK); 2 Ben Roche (c); 3 Jack Williams; 4 Nicholas Prescott; 5; 6 Taj Lynch; 7 David Barber; 8 Matthew Hearne; 9 Ben Atkins; 10 Benjamin Sutton; 11 James Turner; 12 Christian Tsangas (GK); 13 Cosimo Cirillo; 14 Zachary Jones; Coach: Kai Lammert

== Venues ==
The venues to be used for the World Championships were located in San Luis.

San Luis				2017 IFCPF CP Football World Championships is located in Argentina
Provincial Juan Gilberto Funes Stadium	Stadium Estancia Grande	Campus de Universidad De La Punta	Stadium La Pedrera	2017 IFCPF CP Football World Championships is located in Argentina
Capacity: 15,000	Capacity: 1,500	Capacity:	Capacity:	2017 IFCPF CP Football World Championships is located in Argentina

== Format ==
The first round, or group stage, was a competition between the 16 teams divided among four groups of four, where each group engaged in a round-robin tournament within itself. The two highest ranked teams in each group advanced to the knockout stage for the position one to sixteen. the two lower ranked teams played for the positions 17 to 32. The teams were awarded three points for a win and one for a draw. When comparing teams in a group over-all result came before head-to-head.

Tie-breaking criteria for group play
The ranking of teams in each group was based on the following criteria:
1. Number of points
2. Goal difference
3. Number of goals scored
4. Number of points obtained in matches between tied teams
5. Goal difference in matches between tied teams
6. Number of goals scored in matches between tied teams
7. Drawing of lots

In the knockout stage there were three rounds (quarter-finals, semi-finals, and the final). The winners plays for the higher positions, the losers for the lower positions. For any match in the knockout stage, a draw after 60 minutes of regulation time was followed by two 10 minute periods of extra time to determine a winner. If the teams were still tied, a penalty shoot-out was held to determine a winner.

Classification
Athletes with a physical disability competed. The athlete's disability was caused by a non-progressive brain damage that affects motor control, such as cerebral palsy, traumatic brain injury or stroke. Athletes must be ambulant.

Players were classified by level of disability.

- C5: Athletes with difficulties when walking and running, but not in standing or when kicking the ball.
- C6: Athletes with control and co-ordination problems of their upper limbs, especially when running.
- C7: Athletes with hemiplegia.
- C8: Athletes with minimal disability; must meet eligibility criteria and have an impairment that has impact on the sport of football.

Teams must field at least one class C5 or C6 player at all times. No more than two players of class C8 are permitted to play at the same time.

== Group stage ==
The first round, or group stage, have seen the sixteen teams divided into four groups of four teams.

=== Group A ===
Pos	Team	Pld	W	D	L	GF	GA	GD	Pts	Qualified for
1	Brazil	3	3	0	0	12	0	+12	9	Team play for the position 1 - 8
2	(Republic of Ireland) Ireland	3	1	1	1	10	8	+2	4	Team play for the position 1 - 8
3	Canada	3	1	1	1	7	6	+1	4	Team play for the position 9 - 16
4	Spain	3	0	0	3	1	16	−15	0	Team play for the position 9 - 16

Rules for classification: Tie-breaking criteria
12 September 2017
10:00

Spain	0–5	Brazil
	Report	W. Martins 35'; W. De Oliveira 37', 49'; Costa Martins 41', 48'

Stadium Juan Gilberto Funes
12 September 2017
12:00

Ireland (Republic of Ireland)	3–3	Canada
Sheridan 2', 49'; Tier 55'	Report	Charron 11', 28'; Stanley 60'

Stadium Juan Gilberto Funes
14 September 2017
12:00

Brazil	5–0	(Republic of Ireland) Ireland
Magalhães 3', 13', 15'; Moraes 27', 37'	Report

Stadium Estancia Grande
14 September 2017
12:00

Canada	4–1	Spain
Ackinclose 13', 24'; Stanley 17'; Charron 53'	Report	Gomez Suarez 26'

Stadium Juan Gilberto Funes
16 September 2017
10:00

Brazil	2–0	Canada
W. De Oliveira 10'; W. Martins 43'	Report

Stadium Juan Gilberto Funes
16 September 2017
10:00

Ireland (Republic of Ireland)	7–0	Spain
Messett 11' (pen.), 31', 32', 55'; Sheridan 12', 41'; Tier 36'	Report

Stadium Estancia Grande

=== Group B ===
Pos	Team	Pld	W	D	L	GF	GA	GD	Pts	Qualified for
1	Russia	3	3	0	0	14	3	+11	9	Team play for the position 1 - 8
2	Iran	3	2	0	1	13	9	+4	6	Team play for the position 1 - 8
3	Argentina	3	1	0	2	7	14	−7	3	Team play for the position 9 - 16
4	Portugal	3	0	0	3	1	9	−8	0	Team play for the position 9 - 16

Rules for classification: Tie-breaking criteria
10 September 2017
17:00

Argentina	3–1	Portugal
Acevedo 4'; Cortes 23'; Fernadez 60'	Report	Leal Ferreira 37'

Stadium La Pedrera
11 September 2017
11:00

Russia	6–2	Iran
Kuligin 23'; Borkin 25', 26'; Pestretsov 30', 59'; Larionov 33'	Report	Tiz Bor 38', 60'

Stadium Juan Gilberto Funes
12 September 2017
16:00

Russia	3–0	Portugal
Pestretsov 3', 44'; Larionov 28'	Report

Stadium Juan Gilberto Funes
12 September 2017
18:00

Iran	8–3	Argentina
Jamali 18', 28'; Bakhshi 24'; Masoumzadeh 26'; Tiz Bor 30', 34', 37', 57'	Report	Morana 21', 37', 60'

Stadium Juan Gilberto Funes
14 September 2017
16:00

Portugal	0–3	Iran
	Report	Sehsari 7'; Jamali 22', 42'

Stadium Estancia Grande
14 September 2017
16:00

Argentina	1–5	Russia
Morana 37'	Report	Pestretsov 30', 33'; Larionov 35', 46'; Borkin 38'

Stadium Juan Gilberto Funes

=== Group C ===
Pos	Team	Pld	W	D	L	GF	GA	GD	Pts	Qualified for
1	England	3	3	0	0	25	0	+25	9	Team play for the position 1 - 8
2	Netherlands	3	2	0	1	6	5	+1	6	Team play for the position 1 - 8
3	Venezuela	3	0	1	2	0	11	−11	1	Team play for the position 9 - 16
4	Japan	3	0	1	2	0	15	−15	1	Team play for the position 9 - 16

Rules for classification: Tie-breaking criteria
11 September 2017
10:00

Netherlands	2–0	Venezuela
Schuitert 6'; Rodenburg 60'	Report

Stadium Juan Gilberto Funes
11 September 2017
12:00

England	11–0	Japan
Fletcher 10'; Porcher 13', 22', 60'; Nugent 16'; Ono 26' (o.g.), 30' (o.g.); Crossen 40'; Smith 43', 46'; Blackwell 48'	Report

Stadium Juan Gilberto Funes
13 September 2017
10:00

England	9–0	Venezuela
Fletcher 4', 34', 39'; Crossen 8'; Porcher 22', 52'; Barker 30'; Tribe 48', 50'	Report

Stadium Juan Gilberto Funes
13 September 2017
12:00

Japan	0–4	Netherlands
	Report	Schuitert 19'; Rodenburg, 20', 21'; De La Cruz Victoria 30'

Stadium Juan Gilberto Funes
15 September 2017
12:00

Netherlands	0–5	England
	Report	Nugent 16', 18'; Rutter 34'; Barker 40', 48' (pen.)

Stadium Juan Gilberto Funes
15 September 2017
12:00

Venezuela	0–0	Japan
	Report

Stadium Estancia Grande

=== Group D ===
Pos	Team	Pld	W	D	L	GF	GA	GD	Pts	Qualified for
1	Ukraine	3	3	0	0	15	0	+15	9	Team play for the position 1 - 8
2	United States	3	2	0	1	11	2	+9	6	Team play for the position 1 - 8
3	Australia	3	1	0	2	2	15	−13	3	Team play for the position 9 - 16
4	Northern Ireland	3	0	0	3	1	12	−11	0	Team play for the position 9 - 16

Rules for classification: Tie-breaking criteria
11 September 2017
16:00

Ukraine	5–0	Northern Ireland
Romanchuk 13', 32', 36'; Antoniuk 19'; Podolskyi 59'	Report

Stadium Juan Gilberto Funes
11 September 2017
18:00

United States	6–0	Australia
Jahn 5'; DeLillo 8', 21'; Atkins 9' (o.g.); Ballou 30', 55'	Report

Stadium Juan Gilberto Funes
13 September 2017
16:00

United States	5–0	Northern Ireland
Hensley 16', 17'; Ballou 19'; DeLillo 35'; Bremer 55'	Report

Stadium Juan Gilberto Funes
13 September 2017
18:00

Australia	0–8	Ukraine
	Report	Sheremet 4'; Dutko 7'; Atkins 8' (o.g.); Romanchuk 34'; Antoniuk 38', 41'; Shkvarlo 45', 54'

Stadium Juan Gilberto Funes
15 September 2017
16:00

Ukraine	2–0	United States
Krasylnykov 7'; Molodtsov 53'	Report

Stadium Juan Gilberto Funes
15 September 2017
16:00

Northern Ireland	1–2	Australia
J. Walker 30' (pen.)	Report	Jones 13'; Atkins 34'

Stadium Estancia Grande

== Knockout stage ==
=== Quarter-finals ===
Position 9-16

17 September
10:00

Australia	3–2	Japan
Atkins 8'; Jones 19'; Barber 54' (pen.)	Report	Ura 55', 57'

Stadium Juan Gilberto Funes
Referee: Sergio Funes

17 September
12:30

Venezuela	1–2	Northern Ireland
Olivares Mora 37'	Report	R. Walker 52', 59'

Stadium Juan Gilberto Funes
Referee: Matias Noguera

17 September
15:30

Argentina	11–0	Spain
Acevedo 13', 16'; Figuera 19'; Bonomi 33', 46', 50', 54'; Carrizo 44'; Cortes 45'; Coronel 58'; Fernandez 59'	Report

Stadium Juan Gilberto Funes
Referee: Carlos Dias

17 September
18:00

Canada	0–1	Portugal
	Report	L. Pinheiro 60'

Stadium Juan Gilberto Funes
Referee: Akmal Rahimov

Position 1-8

18 September
10:00

Ukraine	7–0	Netherlands
Kahramanian 6'; Antoniuk 8', 25'; Krasylnykov 19'; Dutko 33', 37'; Podolskyi 59'	Report

Stadium Juan Gilberto Funes
Referee: Marcelo Lujan

18 September
12:30

England	2–1	United States
Fletcher 36'; Rutter 45'	Report	Ballou 24'

Stadium Juan Gilberto Funes
Referee: Hector Bondia

18 September
15:30

Russia	5–0	(Republic of Ireland) Ireland
Eloev 13'; Tumakov 18'; Pagaev 34'; Pestretsov 44', 52'	Report

Stadium Juan Gilberto Funes
Referee: Roque Narvaez

18 September
18:00

Brazil	0–1 (a.e.t.)	Iran
	Report	Tiz Bor 76'

Stadium Juan Gilberto Funes
Referee: Jorge Barbisan

=== Semi-finals ===
Position 13-16

19 September
10:00

Venezuela	4–2 (a.e.t.)	Spain
Quintana 10'; Yari Villegas 49', 80'; Olivares Mora 64'	Report	Pardo 6'; Rovira 59'

Stadium Juan Gilberto Funes
Referee: Daniel Silcan

19 September
12:30

Japan	0–4	Canada
	Report	Charron 2', 35'; Ackinclose 15', 19'

Stadium Juan Gilberto Funes
Referee: Rocio Ortiz

Position 9-12

19 September
15:30

Northern Ireland	0–1	Argentina
	Report	Lugrin 12'

Stadium Juan Gilberto Funes
Referee: Adrian Santa

19 September
18:00

Australia	2–0	Portugal
Roche 35'; Jones 56'	Report

Stadium Juan Gilberto Funes
Referee: Ross Haswell

Position 5-8

20 September
10:00

United States	3–2	Brazil
Jahn 24'; Mayhugh 32'; Ballou 36'	Report	Magalhães 6'; A Martins 10'

Stadium Juan Gilberto Funes
Referee: Carlos Dias

20 September
12:30

Netherlands	1–5	(Republic of Ireland) Ireland
Saedt 53'	Report	Sheridan 15', 16', 32', 51'; Tier 33'

Stadium Juan Gilberto Funes

Position 1-4

20 September
15:30

England	1–3	Iran
Porcher 18'	Report	Sehsari 5'; Masoumzadeh 11'; Tiz Bor 41'

Stadium Juan Gilberto Funes
Referee: Akmal Rahimov

20 September
19:00

Ukraine	2–2 (a.e.t.)	Russia
Len 4'; Krasylnykov 14'	Report	Kuligin 44'; Minenko 49'
Penalties
	(4–2p)

Stadium Juan Gilberto Funes
Referee: Skye Arthur Banning

== Finals ==
Position 15-16

21 September
10:00

Spain	0–0(a.e.t.)	Japan
	Report
Penalties
	(3–2p)

Stadium Juan Gilberto Funes
Referee: Rickart Daniel

Position 13-14

21 September
12:30

Venezuela	1–2	Canada
Quintana 52'	Report	Charron 33'; McDonald 40'

Stadium Juan Gilberto Funes
Referee: Marcelo Lujan

Position 11-12

21 September
15:30

Northern Ireland	2–1	Portugal
Leavy 21'; Walker 64'	Report	Ribeiro Gonçalves 11'

Stadium Juan Gilberto Funes
Referee: Roque Narvaez

Position 9-10

21 September
18:00

Argentina	2–1	Australia
Morana 21'; Bonomi 64'	Report	Prescott 30'

Stadium Juan Gilberto Funes
Referee: Akmal Rahimov

Position 7-8

22 September
10:00

Brazil	7–0	Netherlands
De Oliveira 1', 6'; Costa Martins 18' da Silva Martins 24', 27', 58' da Costa 51'	Report

Stadium Juan Gilberto Funes
Referee: Skye Arthur Banning

Position 5-6

22 September
12:30

United States	3–2	(Republic of Ireland) Ireland
DeLillo 7', 60'; Garza 60'	Report	Tier 22'; Sheridan 31'

Stadium Juan Gilberto Funes
Referee: Darío Rojas

Position 3-4

23 September
14:00

England	0–2	Russia
	Report	Borkin 78'; Eloev 79'

Stadium Juan Gilberto Funes
Referee: Jorge Barbisan

Final

23 September
16:30

Iran	0–1	Ukraine
	Report	Sheremet 39'

Stadium Juan Gilberto Funes
Referee: Ross Haswell

== Statistics ==
=== Goalscorers ===
10 goals

- (Republic of Ireland) Dillon Sheridan

8 goals

- (Russia) Dmitrii Pestretsov
- (Iran) Hossein Tiz Bor

6 goals

- (Canada) Samuel Charron
- (England) David Porcher

5 goals

- (Ukraine) Volodymyr Antoniuk
- (United States) Adam Ballou
- (Argentina) Kevin Damian Bonomi
- (United States) Cameron DeLillo
- (England) George Fletcher
- (Argentina) Mariano Morana

4 goals

- (Canada) James Victor Ackinclose
- (Russia) Aleksei Borkin
- (Iran) Mehdi Jamali
- (Russia) Viacheslav Larionov
- (Brazil) Ubirajara Magalhães
- (Republic of Ireland) Gary Messett
- (Ukraine) Vitaliy Romanchuk

3 goals

- (Northern Ireland) Ryan Walker
- (Brazil) Wanderson Silva de Oliveira
- (Argentina) Juan Andrés Acevedo
- (England) Michael Barker
- (Brazil) Adriano Costa Martins
- (Brazil) Eduardo Felipe da Silva Martins
- (Ukraine) Taras Dutko
- (Australia) Zachary Jones
- (Ukraine) Artem Krasylnykov
- (England) Oliver Nugent
- (Netherlands) Rik Rodenburg
- (Republic of Ireland) Aaron Tier

2 goals

- (Australia) Ben Atkins
- (Brazil) Evandro Oliveira Gomes De Oliveira
- (Argentina) Mariano Cortes
- (England) Matthew Anthony Crossen
- (Russia) Marat Eloev
- (United States) Kevin Hensley
- (United States) Seth Jahn
- (Russia) Aleksandr Kuligin
- (Brazil) Wesley Martins
- (Iran) Ehsan Masoumzadeh
- (Brazil) Leonardo Giovani Moraes
- (Venezuela) Asbrubal Olivares Mora
- (Ukraine) Stanislav Podolskyi
- (Venezuela) Jose Quintana
- (England) Jack Rutter
- (Netherlands) Jeroen Schuitert
- (Ukraine) Artem Sheremet
- (Ukraine) Ivan Shkvarlo
- (England) Dale Smith
- (Canada) Liam Stanley
- (England) Lewis Martin Tribe
- (Japan) Tatsuhiro Ura
- (Venezuela) Yari Villegas

1 goal

- (Iran) Jasem Bakhshi
- (Australia) David Barber
- (England) James Blackwell
- (United States) Andrew Marten Bremer
- (Argentina) Carlos Carrizo
- (Argentina) Duncan Coronel
- (Brazil) Jan da Costa
- (Netherlands) Malik Madiba de la Cruz Victoria
- (Iran) Amirreza Ezzatdoust Sehsari
- (Argentina) Matiaz Fernadez
- (Argentina) Maximiliano Fernandez
- (Argentina) Claudio Figuera
- (United States) David Garza
- (Spain) Jose Manuel Gomez Suarez
- (Ukraine) Edhar Kahramanian
- (Portugal) Luís Miguel Leal Ferreira
- (Northern Ireland) David Leavy
- (Ukraine) Oleh Len
- (Argentina) Rodrigo Lugrin
- (Brazil) Adriano Costa Martins
- (United States) Nicholas Mayhugh
- (Canada) Duncan McDonald
- (Russia) Dmitry Minenko
- (Ukraine) Dmytro Molodtsov
- (Russia) Zaurbek Pagaev
- (Spain) Mario Fernandez Pardo
- (Portugal) Lucas Pinheiro
- (Australia) Nicholas Prescott
- (Portugal) Rui Diogo Ribeiro Gonçalves
- (Australia) Ben Roche
- (Spain) Santiago Macia Rovira
- (Netherlands) Jeroen Saedt
- (Iran) Amirreza Ezzatdoust Sehsari
- (Russia) Aleksey Tumakov
- (England) Jordan Walker

own goals

- 2 x (Australia) Ben Atkins
- 2 x (Japan) Tomohisa Ono

=== Ranking ===
Rank	Team
Gold medal	Ukraine
Silver medal	Iran
Bronze medal	Russia
4.	England
5.	United States
6.	(Republic of Ireland) Ireland
7.	Brazil
8.	Netherlands
9.	Argentina
10.	Australia
11.	Northern Ireland
12.	Portugal
13.	Canada
14.	Venezuela
15.	Spain
16.	Japan
