= 2011 CPISRA Football 7-a-side World Championships =

- 2011 CPISRA Football 7-a-side World Championships official logo

Tournament details
- Host country: Netherlands
- Dates: 17 June – 1 July 2011
- Teams: 16
- Venue: 4 (in 3 host cities)

Final positions
- Champions: Russia
- Runners-up: Iran
- Third place: Ukraine
- Fourth place: Brazil

Tournament statistics
- Matches played: 48
- Goals scored: 318 (6.63 per match)
- Top scorer(s): (England) Michael Barker (11) (Argentina) Brian Vivot (11)

The 2011 CPISRA Football 7-a-side World Championships was the world championship for men's national 7-a-side association football teams. CPISRA stands for Cerebral Palsy International Sports & Recreation Association. Athletes with a physical disability competed. The Championship took place in the Netherlands from 17 June to 1 July 2011.

Football 7-a-side was played with modified FIFA rules. Among the modifications were that there were seven players, no offside, a smaller playing field, and permission for one-handed throw-ins. Matches consisted of two thirty-minute halves, with a fifteen-minute half-time break. The Championships was a qualifying event for the London 2012 Paralympic Games.

== Participating teams and officials ==
=== Qualifying ===
The following teams are qualified for the tournament:

Means of qualification	Date	Venue	Berths	Qualified
Host nation			1	Netherlands
2009 International Championships	23 October – 1 November 2009	Arnhem, Netherlands	6	Argentina; Brazil; Iran (Republic of Ireland) Ireland; Russia; Ukraine
2010 American Cup; The next teams that were not yet qualified	17 – 27 October 2010	Buenos Aires, Argentina	2	Canada; United States
2010 Asian Para Games; The next teams that were not yet qualified	12 – 19 December 2010	Guangzhou, China	2	Japan; South Korea
2010 European Championships; The next teams that were not yet qualified	17 – 28 August 2010	Glasgow, Scotland	4	England; Finland; Spain; Scotland
Oceania Region			1	Australia
Total			16	

=== The draw ===
During the draw, the teams were divided into pots because of rankings. Here, the following groups:

	Group A	Group B	Group C	Group D
Pot 1	Brazil (4.)	Ukraine (3.)	Russia (1.)	Iran (2.)
Pot 2	Netherlands (5.)	Scotland (6.)	Argentina (7.)	United States (8.)
Pot 3	Australia (11.)	Canada (12.)	England (10.)	(Republic of Ireland) Ireland (9.)
Pot 4	Spain (14.)	Finland (15.)	South Korea (16.)	Japan (13.)

=== Squads ===
The individual teams contact following football gamblers on to:

Group A

Brazil	Netherlands	Australia	Spain
1 Marcos dos Santos Ferreira; 3 José Augusto Siqueira; 4 Dihego Rezende Rodrigues; 5 José Carlos Monteiro Guimarᾶes; 6 Mateus Francisco Tostes Calvo; 7 Fábio da Silva Bordignon; 8 Rael de Medeiros Coelho; 9 Renato da Rocha Lima; 10 Wanderson Silva de Oliveira; 11 Jan Francisco Brito da Costa; 12 Moisés Tamiozzo da Silva; 16 Jean Adriano Rodrigues	1 Rudi van Breemen; 4 Myron Gebbink; 5 Lars Conijn; 6 Peter Kooij; 7 Dennis Straatman; 8 Pawel Statema; 9 John Swinkels; 10 Stephan Lokhoff; 11 Iljas Visker; 14 Daan Dikken; 15 Joey Mense; 16 Bart Adelaars; 17 Abel Walraven; 18 Gerard Arends; 19 Quincy de Beukelaer; 22 Stefan Boersma	1 Sam Larkins; 2 Ben Roche; 3 Jack Williams; 4 Scott Kennedy; 6 Christopher Pyne; 7 David Barber; 8 Brett Fairhall; 9 Ben Atkins; 10 Thomas Goodman; 11 Beau Menzies; 12 Jamie Paulsen; 13 Jared Eiby	1 Omar Alvarez Serrano; 2 Jonatan Corporales Rodríguez; 3 Raúl Carrillo Arjona; 4 Ramón Del Pino Bernardó; 5 Carlos Antón Valor; 6 Roberto Ortiz Lora; 7 Sergio Clemente Muñoz; 8 Carlos Rodríguez Grande; 9 Emilio Manuel Ribeiro Sequeira; 10 Raúl Pacheco Pérez; 11 Abel Urbina Sánchez; 12 Leandro Pérez Ferreira
Coach: Paulo Fernando Rodrigues da Cruz	Coach: Marcel Geestman	Coach: Paul Brown	Coach: Emilio Pereira Pérez

Group B

Ukraine	Scotland	Canada	Finland
1 Kostyantyn Symashko; 2 Vitaliy Trushev; 3 Serhiy Vakulenko; 4 Taras Dutko; 5 Anatolii Shevchyk; 6 Ivan Shkvarlo; 7 Andriy Tsukanov; 8 Denys Ponomaryov; 9 Mykola Mikhovych; 10 Oleksiy Hetun; 11 Volodymyr Antonyuk; 12 Ihor Kosenko	1 Craig Connell; 2 Blair Glynn; 3 Laurie McGinley; 4 Scott Troup; 5 Graeme Paterson; 6 Jamie Tervit; 7 Mark Robertson; 8 James Richmond; 9 Anton Clarke; 10 Jonathan Paterson; 11 Thomas Brown	1 Cameron Kleimer; 2 Geoff Wakefield; 3 John Phillips; 4 Christopher Duehrsen; 5 Christopher Fawcett; 6 James Akinclose; 7 Dustin Hodgson; 8 Brendon McAdam; 9 Ross MacDonald; 10 Vito Proietti; 11 Matthew Brown; 12 Jeremy Baird	1 Jaakko Seppälä; 2 Joona Kuitunen; 3 Wiljami Laurila; 7 Jussi Tuominen; 8 Mikael Jukarainen; 9 Janne Helander; 10 Johannes Siikonen; 14 Pyry Nopsanen; 15 Samuel Taipale; 16 Joni Berg
Coach: Sergiy Ovcharenko	Coach: Stuart Sharp	Coach: Drew Ferguson	Coach: Samuel Siikonen

Group C

Russia	Argentina	England	South Korea
3 Aslanbek Sapiev; 6 Aleksey Tumakov; 7 Alexey Chesmin; 8 Ivan Potekhin; 9 Eduard Ramonov; 10 Andrey Kuvaev; 12 Alexander Lekov; 13 Lasha Murvanadze; 15 Vyacheslav Larionov; 16 Vladislav Raretsky; 17 Zaurbek Pagaev; 18 Aleksandr Kuligin	1 Gustavo Nahuelquin; 2 Mariano Morana; 3 Carlos Ferreira; 4 Ezequiel Jaime; 5 Brian Vivot; 6 Maximiliano Fernandez; 7 Ariel Medina; 8 Gaston Eduardo Rodriguez; 9 Angel Gabriel Rodriquez; 10 Rodrigo Lugrin; 11 Matias Fernandez; 13 Marcos Salazar	1 Jordan Raynes; 2 Matthew Dimbylow; 3 Martin Sinclair; 4 Alistair Heselton; 5 Emyle Rudder; 6 Joshua Beacham; 7 George Fletcher; 8 Matthew Ellis; 9 Michael Barker; 10 Graham Leclerc; 11 Karl Townshend; 12 Billy Thompson	1 Hyeseong Son; 2 Hyungsoo Kim; 3 Junho Jang; 4 Jongtae Kim; 5 Haecheol Park; 6 Jaesik Moon; 7 Seungmok Park; 8 Phillip Jung; 9 Seungnam Kang; 10 Kyeongkuk Gu; 11 Sangpil Cho; 12 Hyoungjun Lee
Coach: Avtandil Baramidze	Coach: Osvaldo Hernandez	Coach: Lyndon Lynch	Coach: Jaeyong Kim

Group D

Iran	United States	(Republic of Ireland) Ireland	Japan
1 Moslem Akbari; 2 Behnam Sohrabibagherabadi; 3 Mehran Majd Nikoee; 4 Ehsan Gholamhosseinpour Booshehri; 5 Heidari Morteza; 6 Rasoul Atashafrouz; 7 Bahman Ansari; 8 Heidari Habibollah Mehr; 9 Jasem Bakhshi; 10 Mehri Farzad; 11 Sadegh Hassani Baghi; 12 Hashem Rastegarimobin	1 Keith Johnson; 2 Nick Creasey; 3 Jason Slemons; 4 Chad Jones; 5 Bryce Boarman; 6 Chris Ahrens; 7 Adam Ballou; 8 Tom Latsch; 9 Josh McKinney; 10 Marthell Vazquez; 11 Tyler Bennett; 12 Charlie Howard	1 Brian McGillivary; 2 Finbar O'Riordan; 3 Paul Dollard; 4 Luke Evans; 5 Joseph Markey; 6 Mark Jones; 7 Gary Messett; 8 Eric O'Flaherty; 9 Jason Moran; 10 Daragh Snell; 11 Aaron Tiers; 12 Simon Le Strange	1 Henry Naoyoshi Kagayama; 2 Hideyuki Yanagi; 3 Kenji Hashimoto; 4 Yuji Yamada; 5 Taisei Taniguchi; 6 Ryuta Yoshino; 7 Kazuhiro Kubo; 8 Kodai Nakaoka; 9 Tetsuya Toda; 10 Tsukasa Kawano; 12 Takayuki Iwasa
Coach: Hossein Saleh	Coach: Jay Hoffman	Coach: Daragh Sheridan	Coach: Yukio Jin

== Venues ==
The venues to be used for the World Championships were located in Assen, Emmen and Hoogeveen.

Emmen		2011 CPISRA Football 7-a-side World Championships is located in Netherlands	Assen	Hoogeveen
Univé Stadion (FC Emmen)	Sportpark Meerdijk Noord (SC Angelslo)	2011 CPISRA Football 7-a-side World Championships is located in Netherlands	Sportpark Marsdijk (Achilles 1894)	Sportveld Weide (club VV De Weide)
Capacity: 8,600	Capacity: unknown	2011 CPISRA Football 7-a-side World Championships is located in Netherlands	Capacity: 5,000	Capacity: unknown

== Format ==
The first round, or group stage, was a competition between the 16 teams divided among four groups of four, where each group engaged in a round-robin tournament within itself. The two highest ranked teams in each group advanced to the knockout stage for the position one to eight. the two lower ranked teams plays for the positions nine to 16. Teams were awarded three points for a win and one for a draw. When comparing teams in a group over-all result came before head-to-head.

Tie-breaking criteria for group play
The ranking of teams in each group was based on the following criteria:
1. Number of points
2. Goal difference
3. Number of goals scored
4. Number of points obtained in matches between tied teams
5. Goal difference in matches between tied teams
6. Number of goals scored in matches between tied teams
7. Drawing of lots

In the knockout stage there were three rounds (quarter-finals, semi-finals, and the final). The winners plays for the higher positions, the losers for the lower positions. For any match in the knockout stage, a draw after 60 minutes of regulation time was followed by two 10 minute periods of extra time to determine a winner. If the teams were still tied, a penalty shoot-out was held to determine a winner.

Classification
Athletes with a physical disability competed. The athlete's disability was caused by a non-progressive brain damage that affects motor control, such as cerebral palsy, traumatic brain injury or stroke. Athletes must be ambulant.

Players were classified by level of disability.

- C5: Athletes with difficulties when walking and running, but not in standing or when kicking the ball.
- C6: Athletes with control and co-ordination problems of their upper limbs, especially when running.
- C7: Athletes with hemiplegia.
- C8: Athletes with minimal disability; must meet eligibility criteria and have an impairment that has impact on the sport of football.

Teams must field at least one class C5 or C6 player at all times. No more than two players of class C8 are permitted to play at the same time.

== Group stage ==
The first round, or group stage, have seen the sixteen teams divided into four groups of four teams. In every match a maximum of 10 goals scored were counted. This is indicated with an asterisk (*)

=== Group A ===
Pos	Team	Pld	W	D	L	GF	GA	GD	Pts	Qualified for
1	Brazil	3	2	1	0	21	1	+20	7	Team play for the position 1 - 8
2	Netherlands	3	2	1	0	13	1	+12	7	Team play for the position 1 - 8
3	Australia	3	1	0	2	4	19	−15	3	Team play for the position 9 - 16
4	Spain	3	0	0	3	2	19	−17	0	Team play for the position 9 - 16

Source: 2011 CPISRA Football 7-a-side World Championships
Rules for classification: Tie-breaking criteria
17 June 2011

Netherlands	1–1	Brazil
Swinkels 29'	Report	Silva de Oliveira 7'

Univé Stadion, Emmen
18 June 2011

Australia	4–2	Spain
Larkins 14', 17', 19', 58'	Report	Valor 10'; Muñoz 38'

Sportpark Meerdijk Noord, Emmen
20 June 2011

Brazil	10–0	Australia
Silva de Oliveira 12', 50', 51'; J. Rodrigues 17', 38' da Rocha Lima 18' da Silva Bordignon 21', 26'; D. Rodrigues 52'; Guimarᾶes 55'	Report

Sportpark Schutlanden, Hoogeveen
20 June 2011

Netherlands	5–0	Spain
Conijn 15', 46'; Visker 26'; Lokhoff 42'; Swinkels 60+3'	Report

Sportpark Schutlanden, Hoogeveen
22 June 2011

Spain	0–10	Brazil
	Report	da Rocha Lima 14'; Silva de Oliveira 15' da Silva Bordignon 20', 24', 27', 28'; Brito da Costa 21'; D. Rodrigues 43', 54'; Arjona 53' (o.g.)

Sportpark Schutlanden, Hoogeveen
22 June 2011

Netherlands	7–0	Australia
Kooij 3', 60+1'; Lokhoff 9'; Conijn 29'; Visker 30', 30+1', 31'	Report

Sportpark Marsdijk, Assen

=== Group B ===
Pos	Team	Pld	W	D	L	GF	GA	GD	Pts	Qualified for
1	Ukraine	3	3	0	0	19	2	+17	9	Team play for the position 1 - 8
2	Scotland	3	2	0	1	14	6	+8	6	Team play for the position 1 - 8
3	Canada	3	1	0	2	7	9	−2	3	Team play for the position 9 - 16
4	Finland	3	0	0	3	2	25	−23	0	Team play for the position 9 - 16

Source: 2011 CPISRA Football 7-a-side World Championships
Rules for classification: Tie-breaking criteria
18 June 2011

Ukraine	5–0	Scotland
Trushev 10', 19', 39'; Dutko 24'; Mikhovych 44'	Report

Sportpark Meerdijk Noord, Emmen
18 June 2011

Canada	6–0	Finland
M. Brown 6'; Ackinclose 7', 19', 26'; McAdam 46'; Hodgson 48'	Report

Sportpark Meerdijk Noord, Emmen
20 June 2011

Scotland	10–0	Finland
McGinley 1', 16', 47', 55', 57'; Clarke 13'; Glynn 41'; J. Paterson 42'; Richmond 47', 51'	Report

Sportpark Schutlanden, Hoogeveen
20 June 2011

Ukraine	5–0	Canada
Ponomaryov 16', 24', 39', 49'; Ackinclose 30+2'	Report

Sportpark Schutlanden, Hoogeveen
22 June 2011

Scotland	4–1	Canada
Robertson 6'; J. Paterson 18'; T. Brown 31', 60'	Report	Hodgson 34'

Sportpark Schutlanden, Hoogeveen
22 June 2011

Finland	2–9	Ukraine
Jukarainen 43'; Siikonen 54'	Report	Shkvarlo 3'; Ponomaryov 7'; Mikhovych 15', 58'; Vakulenko 32', 46', 52', 57'; Tsukanov 59'

Sportpark Marsdijk, Assen

=== Group C ===
Pos	Team	Pld	W	D	L	GF	GA	GD	Pts	Qualified for
1	Russia	3	3	0	0	12	1	+11	9	Team play for the position 1 - 8
2	Argentina	3	2	0	1	14	7	+7	6	Team play for the position 1 - 8
3	England	3	1	0	2	12	6	+6	3	Team play for the position 9 - 16
4	South Korea	3	0	0	3	0	24	−24	0	Team play for the position 9 - 16

Source: 2011 CPISRA Football 7-a-side World Championships
Rules for classification: Tie-breaking criteria
19 June 2011

Russia	3–0	England
Murvanadze 3', 51'; Tumakov 10'	Report

Sportpark Marsdijk, Assen
19 June 2011

Argentina	11–0	South Korea
Vivot 4', 12', 30', 31', 39'; A. Rodriquez 11'; Morana 24', 42', 56'; Lugrin 27'; Salazar 60'	Report

Sportpark Marsdijk, Assen
21 June 2011

Russia	5–1	Argentina
Kuligin 15'; Ramonov 24'; Murvanadze 29'; Kuvaev 49'; Sapiev 56'	Report	Lugrin 8'

Sportpark Meerdijk Noord, Emmen
21 June 2011

England	12–0	South Korea
Heselton 6'; Sinclair 29'; Barker 30+1', 43', 49'; Rudder 32'; Townshend 55', 58'; Fletcher 37', 40', 44'; Dimbylow 59'	Report

Sportpark Meerdijk Noord, Emmen
23 June 2011

South Korea	0–4	Russia
	Report	Kuligin 5'; Pagaev 25'; Sapiev 27'; Murvanadze 54'

Sportpark Marsdijk, Assen
23 June 2011

England	2–3	Argentina
Barker 17', 47'	Report	A. Rodriquez 16'; Vivot 30+1', 40'

Sportpark Schutlanden, Hoogeveen

=== Group D ===
Pos	Team	Pld	W	D	L	GF	GA	GD	Pts	Qualified for
1	Iran	3	3	0	0	15	3	+12	9	Team play for the position 1 - 8
2	United States	3	2	0	1	9	9	0	6	Team play for the position 1 - 8
3	(Republic of Ireland) Ireland	3	1	0	2	7	3	+4	3	Team play for the position 9 - 16
4	Japan	3	0	0	3	1	17	−16	0	Team play for the position 9 - 16

Source: 2011 CPISRA Football 7-a-side World Championships
Rules for classification: Tie-breaking criteria
19 June 2011

Iran	3–1	(Republic of Ireland) Ireland
Mehri 19'; Atashafrouz 28'; Akbari 34'	Report	Moran 44'

Sportpark Marsdijk, Assen
19 June 2011

United States	4–0	Japan
Vazquez 3', 34'; McKinney 24', 28'	Report

Sportpark Marsdijk, Assen
21 June 2011

Iran	7–2	United States
Ansari 6', 27'; Akbari 13', 24', 60+1'; Mehri 38'; Hassani 58'	Report	Vazquez 14'; McKinney 43'

Sportpark Meerdijk Noord, Emmen

Ireland (Republic of Ireland)	8–1	Japan
Messett 9', 40'; Evans 10', 16', 25', 29'; Markey 17'; Tiers 36'	Report	Taniguchi 13'

Sportpark Meerdijk Noord, Emmen
23 June 2011

Japan	0–5	Iran
	Report	Bakhshi 5'; Hassani 14'; Sohrabibagherabadi 35'; Rastegarimobin 37'; Gholamhosseinpour 55'

Sportpark Marsdijk, Assen
23 June 2011

Ireland (Republic of Ireland)	2–3	United States
Snell 50'; O'Flaherty 60'	Report	Vazquez 15'; McKinney 41'; Ballou 42'

Sportpark Schutlanden, Hoogeveen

== Knockout stage ==
=== Quarter-finals ===
Position 9-16

25 June 2011
12:00

Australia	9–1	Finland
Larkins 14', 33', 51'; Barber 17', 19'; Fairhall 26', 28'; Pyne 30+1', 35'	Report	Jukarainen 56'

Sportpark Schutlanden, Hoogeveen

25 June 2011
14:30

Canada	3–2	Spain
Baird 14'; Ackinclose 39', 44'	Report	Pacheco Pérez 18' del Pino Bernardó 36'

Sportpark Schutlanden, Hoogeveen

26 June 2011
12:00

England	6–0	Japan
Heselton 1'; Barker 16', 17', 49'; Ellis 21'; Sinclair 37'	Report

Sportpark Meerdijk Noord, Emmen

26 June 2011
14:30

Ireland (Republic of Ireland)	12–1	South Korea
Moon 3' (o.g.); O'Flaherty 11'; Snell 13', 44'; Messett 19', 21', 23'; Tiers 32', 46'; Markey 39'	Report	Moon 41'

Sportpark Meerdijk Noord, Emmen

Position 1-8

25 June 2011
17:00

Brazil	4–1	Scotland
Silva de Oliveira 13', 22' da Silva Bordignon 23'; Calvo 36'	Report	T. Brown 5'

Sportpark Schutlanden, Hoogeveen

25 June 2011
19:30

Ukraine	3–1	Netherlands
Dutko 5'; Shevchyk 20'; Antonyuk 28'	Report	Conijn 42'

Sportpark Schutlanden, Hoogeveen

26 June 2011
17:00

Iran	8–0	Argentina
Mehri 10', 19'; Bakhshi 11'; Akbari 18', 30', 41'; Sohrabibagherabadi 44', 49'	Report

Sportpark Meerdijk Noord, Emmen

26 June 2011
19:30

Russia	10–1	United States
Chesmin 13'; Potekhin 15', 18'; Tumakov 17'; Larionov 24'; Sapiev 36'; Pagaev 39', 43'; Murvanadze 48'; Kuvaev 51'	Report	Ballou 31'

Sportpark Meerdijk Noord, Emmen

=== Semi-finals ===
Position 13-16

28 June 2011
12:00

Finland	0–2	Japan
	Report	Toda 19', 23'

Sportpark Marsdijk, Assen

29 June 2011
12:00

Spain	8–1	South Korea
Valor 5', 46', 49'; Muñoz 9', 30'; Pérez 28', 47', 54'	Report	H. Park 25'

Sportpark Schutlanden, Hoogeveen

Position 9-12

28 June 2011
14:30

Australia	0–10	England
	Report	Dimbylow 19', 30', 32'; Barker 21', 26', 29'; Rudder 28'; Sinclair 33'; Townshend 50'; Leclerc 60+2'

Sportpark Marsdijk, Assen

29 June 2011
14:30

Canada	0–6	(Republic of Ireland) Ireland
	Report	Messett 9', 51'; O'Flaherty 21'; Moran 32'; Snell 50', 60+2'

Sportpark Schutlanden, Hoogeveen

Position 5-8

28 June 2011
19:30

Netherlands	4–2	Argentina
Kooij 18'; Straatman 23', 39'; Visker 60'	Report	Morana 30'; Salazar 31'

Sportpark Marsdijk, Assen

29 June 2011
17:00

Scotland	3–2	United States
McGinley 15'; Robertson 28', 33'	Report	Vazquez 13'; McKinney 23'

Sportpark Schutlanden, Hoogeveen

Position 1-4

28 June 2011
17:00

Ukraine	2–4	Iran
Hetun 41'; Dutko 49'	Report	Ansari 3', 5', 11', 20'

Sportpark Marsdijk, Assen

29 June 2011
19:30

Brazil	0–4	Russia
	Report	Ramonov 6', 28'; Kuligin 21'; Kuvaev 31'

Sportpark Schutlanden, Hoogeveen

== Finals ==
Position 15-16

30 June 2011
12:00

Finland	1–0	South Korea
Helander 16'	Report

Sportpark Marsdijk, Assen

Position 13-14

30 June 2011
14:30

Japan	4–3	Spain
Toda 30+1', 49'; Arjona 32' (o.g.); Yoshino 35'	Report	Muñoz 4'; Grande 9'; Pérez 56'

Sportpark Marsdijk, Assen

Position 11-12

30 June 2011
17:00

Australia	2–0	Canada
Fawcett 49' (o.g.); Roche 54'	Report

Sportpark Marsdijk, Assen

Position 9-10

30 June 2011
19:30

England	0–5	(Republic of Ireland) Ireland
	Report	Dollard 9'; Raynes 11' (o.g.); Messett 16'; Markey 27'; Snell 58'

Sportpark Marsdijk, Assen

Position 7-8

1 July 2011
12:00

Argentina	7–2	United States
Vivot 6', 11', 51', 55'; Salazar 38'; Lugrin 54'; Morana 57'	Report	Ballou 8'; Morana 57' (o.g.)

Univé Stadion, Emmen

Position 5-6

1 July 2011
14:30

Netherlands	3–1	Scotland
Straatman 44', 49'; Swinkels 60+2'	Report	Robertson 12'

Univé Stadion, Emmen

Position 3-4

1 July 2011
17:00

Ukraine	8–3	Brazil
Antonyuk 66', 11', 30+1', 45'; Dutko 12'; Shevchyk 26', 46'; Hetun 37'	Report	Silva de Oliveira 8', 60+1'; Brito da Costa 54'

Univé Stadion, Emmen

Final

1 July 2011
19:30

Iran	1–6	Russia
Mehri 41'	Report	Murvanadze 2'; Tumakov 13', 16'; Chesmin 20', 25'; Potekhin 43'

Univé Stadion, Emmen

== Statistics ==
=== Goalscorers ===
11 goals

- (England) Michael Barker
- (Argentina) Brian Vivot

9 goals

- (Brazil) Wanderson Silva de Oliveira

8 goals

- (Republic of Ireland) Gary Messett

7 goals

- (Iran) Moslem Akbari
- (Brazil) Fábio da Silva Bordignon
- (England) Sam Larkins

6 goals

- (Canada) Jamie Ackinclose
- (Republic of Ireland) Bahman Ansari
- (Scotland) Laurie McGinley
- (Russia) Lasha Murvanadze
- (Republic of Ireland) Daragh Snell

5 goals

- (Ukraine) Volodymyr Antonyuk
- (United States) Josh McKinney
- (Iran) Farzad Mehri
- (Argentina) Mariano Morana
- (Spain) Raúl Pacheco Pérez
- (Ukraine) Denys Ponomaryov
- (United States) Marthell Vazquez
- (Netherlands) Iljas Visker

4 goals

- (Netherlands) Lars Conijn
- (England) Matthew Dimbylow
- (Ukraine) Taras Dutko
- (Republic of Ireland) Luke Evans
- (Spain) Sergio Clemente Muñoz
- (Scotland) Mark Robertson
- (Netherlands) Dennis Straatman
- (Russia) Aleksey Tumakov
- (Ukraine) Serhiy Vakulenko
- (Spain) Carlos Antón Valor

3 goals

- (Scotland) Thomas Brown
- (United States) Adam Ballou
- (Russia) Alexey Chesmin
- (Brazil) Dihego Rezende Rodrigues
- (England) George Fletcher
- (Netherlands) Peter Kooij
- (Russia) Aleksandr Kuligin
- (Russia) Andrey Kuvaev
- (Argentina) Rodrigo Lugrin
- (Republic of Ireland) Joseph Markey
- (Ukraine) Mykola Mikhovych
- (Republic of Ireland) Eric O'Flaherty
- (Russia) Zaurbek Pagaev
- (Russia) Ivan Potekhin
- (Russia) Eduard Ramonov
- (Argentina) Marcos Salazar
- (Russia) Aslanbek Sapiev
- (Ukraine) Anatolii Shevchyk
- (England) Martin Sinclair
- (Iran) Behnam Sohrabibagherabadi
- (Netherlands) John Swinkels
- (Republic of Ireland) Aaron Tiers
- (England) Karl Townshend
- (Ukraine) Vitaliy Trushev

2 goals

- (Brazil) Jean Adriano Rodrigues
- (Iran) Baghi Sadegh Hassani
- (Iran) Jasem Bakhshi
- (Australia) David Barber
- (Brazil) Jan Francisco Brito da Costa
- (Brazil) Renato da Rocha Lima
- (Australia) Brett Fairhall
- (England) Alistair Heselton
- (Ukraine) Oleksiy Hetun
- (Canada) Dustin Hodgson
- (England) Jonathan Paterson
- (Finland) Mikael Jukarainen
- (Netherlands) Stephan Lokhoff
- (Argentina) Mariano Morana
- (Australia) Christopher Pyne
- (Argentina) Angel Gabriel Rodriquez
- (England) Emyle Rudder
- (Japan) Tetsuya Toda

1 goal

- (Iran) Rasoul Atashafrouz
- (Canada) Matthew Brown
- (Canada) Jeremy Baird
- (Brazil) Mateus Francisco Tostes Calvo
- (Scotland) Anton Clarke
- (Spain) Ramón del Pino Bernardó
- (Republic of Ireland) Paul Dollard
- (England) Matthew Ellis
- (Iran) Booshehri Ehsan Gholamhosseinpour
- (Scotland) Blair Glynn
- (Spain) Carlos Rodríguez Grande
- (Brazil) José Carlos Monteiro Guimarᾶes
- (England) Janne Helander
- (Russia) Vyacheslav Larionov
- (England) Graham Leclerc
- (Canada) Brendon McAdam
- (South Korea) Jaesik Moon
- (South Korea) Haecheol Park
- (Iran) Hashem Rastegarimobin
- (Scotland) James Richmond
- (Australia) Ben Roche
- (Ukraine) Ivan Shkvarlo
- (Finland) Johannes Siikonen
- (Japan) Taisei Taniguchi
- (Ukraine) Andriy Tsukanov
- (Japan) Ryuta Yoshino

own goals

- (Spain) Raúl Carrillo Arjona (2 goals)
- (Canada) Chris Fawcett
- (South Korea) Jaesik Moon
- (Argentina) Mariano Morana
- (England) Jordan Raynes

=== Ranking ===
Rank	Team
Gold medal	Russia
Silver medal	Iran
Bronze medal	Ukraine
4.	Brazil
5.	Netherlands
6.	Scotland
7.	Argentina
8.	United States
9.	(Republic of Ireland) Ireland
10.	England
11.	Australia
12.	Canada
13.	Japan
14.	Spain
15.	Finland
16.	South Korea
