= Australia men's national cerebral palsy soccer team =

National association football team

Australia
- Nickname: Pararoos
- Association: Football Australia
- Confederation: AFC (Asia)
- Sub-confederation: AFF (Southeast Asia)
- Head coach: Kai Lammert
- Captain: David Barber
- Most caps: Christopher Pyne (104)
- Top scorer: David Barber (70)
- FIFA code: AUS
First colours	Second colours
- Website: www.pararoos.com.au

The Australia men's national cerebral palsy soccer team represents Australia in international 7-a-side (CP) competitions. Officially nicknamed the Pararoos, the team is currently controlled by the governing body for soccer in Australia, Football Australia (FA), which are a member of the Asian Football Confederation (AFC) and the regional ASEAN Football Federation (AFF).

Since the team's foundation in 1998, they have represented Australia at the Paralympics on one occasion in 2000 and participated in nine IFCPF/CPISRA World Championships from 2001 to 2019. Australia achieved their highest result in their debut CPISRA campaign in 2001, beating the United States 1–0 to be positioned 5th out of the total 13 teams qualified. The Pararoos are currently ranked 10th in the IFCPF rankings.

The team consists of neurologically impaired athletes with ataxia, hypertonia or athetosis, playing a similar formatted game to Association Football, with smaller squads, fields and differing throw-in and offside rules.

== History ==
=== Foundation (1998) ===
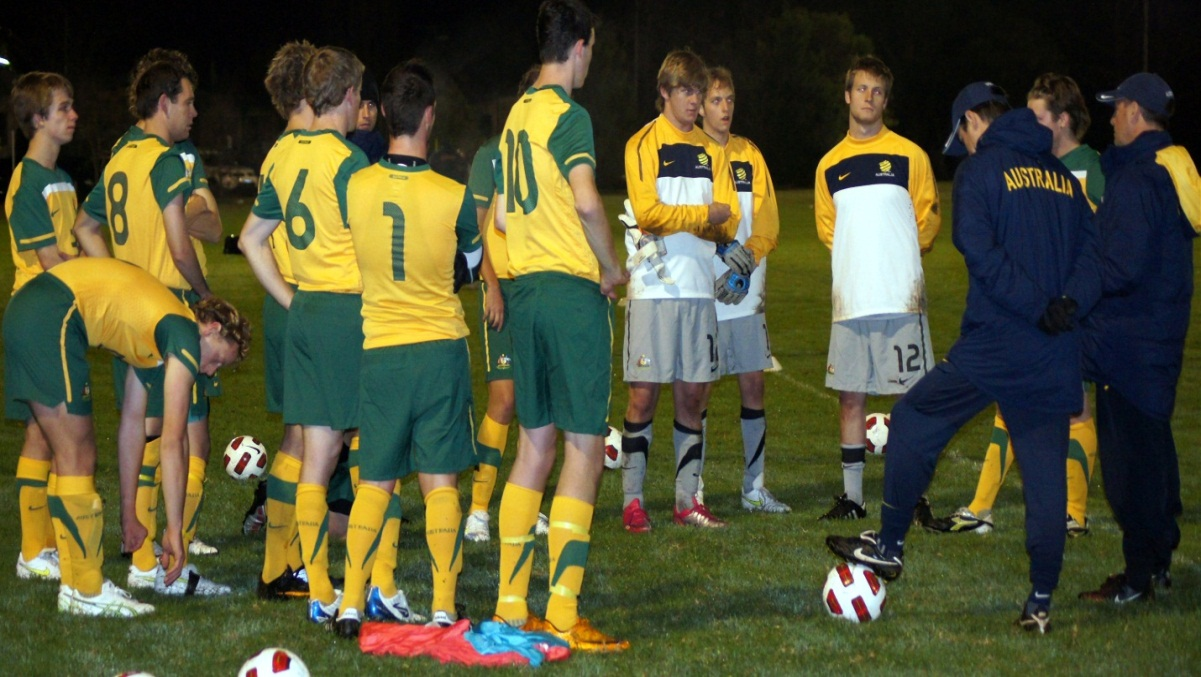
Pararoos squad in training camp

Following the introduction of 7-a-side football in the 1984 Summer Paralympic games, Australia lacked a governing body to oversee and funding to develop a Paralympic football team. In 1998 the Cerebral Palsy Australian Sport & Recreation Federation (CPASRF) and the Australian Paralympic Committee (APC) collectively established a 7-aside football team in preparation for the countries home Sydney 2000 Paralympics. The team managed by Cornelius Van Eldik and coached by both Russell Marriott and David Campbell lost all three games in the group stage of their debut Summer Paralympic campaign.

In 2001, the team participated in their first Cerebral Palsy International Sports and Recreation Association (CPISRA) World Games, defeating both Belgium, Scotland and England to finish 2nd and 3rd in both group phases. The team went on to defeat the United States 1–0 to finish the tournament in 5th. In 2005, an agreement was made between CPASRF and APC, to pass the control of the team to Football Australia (FA) who were the governing body of both the Australian men's and Australian women's football teams at the time.

=== Paul Brown (2006 – 2013) era ===
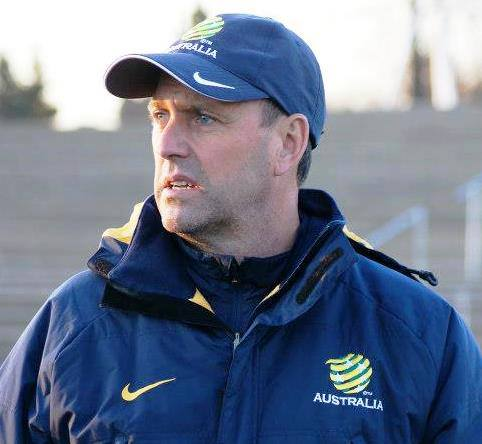
Head Coach, Paul Brown

In March 2006, Paul Brown and Kai Lammert were appointed as the head coach and assistant coach of the Paralympic team respectively. This appointment was in preparation for the 2007 CPISRA World Championships, which was the qualifying event for the 2008 Beijing Paralympic games. The team finished 11th in the CPISRA championship rankings and subsequently failed to qualify for the Paralympic games, after heavy defeats from both England and Brazil.

Following the team's poor performance in the championships, Brown travelled across Australia to help strengthen state programs, and monitor progress of players. Additionally, Brown conducting three national camps across the 12 months period prior to the 2011 CPISRA World Championships, which was the qualification event to the 2012 London Paralympic games. Although defeating Spain 4–2, in the opening game of the 2011 CPISRA World Championships, the Pararoos lost to Brazil, Netherlands and England to finish in 11th place and subsequently did not qualify to the 2012 London Paralympic games.

As part of the Australian Sport Commission's (ASC) introduction of the Winning Edge Policy on the 23 June 2014, the Pararoos' funding was cut by $175,000, with the commission deciding that funding should be prioritised to sports that have the greatest chance of success. Following this decision, head coach Paul Brown launched an online petition for the reinstation of the government funding, with over 82,000 individuals signing the change.org appeal. However, Matthew Favier the ASC Sport director at the time reiterated the commission's decision stating that the “ASC did not believe the team would qualify for Rio”.

In January 2015, the governance of the sport was passed over from the CPISRA to the newly created International Federation of Cerebral Palsy Football (IFCPF) [1]. Paul Brown stepped down from his position as head coach in March 2015.

=== Kai Lammert (2015 – present) era ===
Former assistant manager Kai Lammert was named as the new head coach of the Pararoos in March 2015. During his first months within the job, Football Australia (FA) partnered with the Australian Sports Foundation (ASF) to develop a tax-deductible scheme to raise much needed funds to support the team, in preparation for future football tournaments. With no funding being provided from ASC, the team was able to qualify and travel to Argentina for the inaugural 2017 IFCPF Championships, through crowd sourced funding. The Pararoos ending up finish 10th following a 2–1 defeat to host country Argentina.

In 2018, the team came 2nd in the IFCPF Asia-Oceania Championship after a 7–0 defeat to Iran in the final, to qualify for the renamed IFCPF World Cup in Spain. The Pararoos went on to finish 10th in the IFCPF World Cup, after a 4–2 loss to Canada.

As part of the FIFA Forward 2.0 initiative in 2019, the FA received funding to help Australia's preparations for future international competitions. While also allowing the team to play their first official match in Australia since the 2000 Paralympic games. The game took place on the 30 November 2019, at Cromer Park Sydney, against world number 12, Canada. The Pararoos won the game 5–0, with almost 1200 fans in attendance, being a record for 7-a-side football outside of the Paralympic Games. The game also broke the record for the highest merchandise spend per fan of any Australian national game over the 2019 calendar year. As part of the FIFA initiative 100% of the revenue made on the day was reinstalled into supporting the team. The game also celebrated the 100th match for Pararoos captain David Barber, who holds the record for the most appearances for the Australian Paralympic team.

== Team Image ==
=== Colours ===
The Australian Paralympic soccer team uniform is traditionally the exact same as the Australian men's football team. This features a yellow jersey accompanied by yellow shorts and green socks. While alternatively for the away kit, the shirt and shorts are turquoise, and the socks are yellow. The Australian kits have been supplied by Nike, since 2004.

=== Sponsorship ===
Period	Kit Manufacturer	Shirt Sponsor
1998 - 2004	Adidas	
2004 - 2017	Nike	
2017-2019	Nike	Zest Care
2019 -2022	Nike	

=== Nickname ===
The Australian Paralympic team's nickname, the “Pararoos” is used to informally refer to the team, in the media and in conversation. Similar to other Australian national representative sporting team nicknames, the term is a portmanteau word combining Paralympic and Kangaroo.

== Players ==
Caps and goals correct as of 17 May 2022.

Cap No.	Position	Player	Date of birth (age)	Appearances	Goals	Debut
49	GK	Cosimo Cirillo	18 May 2001 (age 20)	4	1	v. Iran 3 August 2016
2	GK, DF, MF	Christopher Pyne	3 May 1984 (age 38)	104	20	v. Netherlands 27 October 1999
1	DF	David Barber (captain)	13 July (age 42)	101	70	v. Netherlands 27 October 1999
27	DF	Ben Atkins	26 June 1981 (age 30)	72	8	v. Canada 31 May 2008
48	DF	Alessandro La Verghetta	6 January 2001 (age 21)	7	2	v. Iran 3 August 2016
51	DF, MF	Taj Lynch	15 November 2000 (age 21)	16	1	v. Ukraine 13 September
46	DF, MF	Matthew Hearne	2 July 1999 (age 22)	21	2	v. Spain 31 July 2016
54	DF, MF	Bradley Scott	15 April 1988 (age 34)	3	1	v. (South Korea) Korea Republic 24 November 2018
44	MF	Angus MacGregor	13 June 1995 (age 26)	12	1	v. Russia 20 June 2015
53	MF	Daniel Campbell	25 January 2003 (age 19)	6	2	v. United States 19 July 2018
17	MF, FW	Benjamin Roche	21 November 1988 (age 33)	54	30	v. Japan 29 June 2005
50	FW	Benjamin Sutton	8 May 1993 (age 29)	4	1	v. United States 11 September 2017
52	FW	Augustine Murphy	2 May 2000 (age 22)	5	0	v. United States 19 July 2018

== Club Officials ==
=== Current technical staff ===
Updated as of 22 May 2022.

Position	Name
Head Coach	(Australia) Kai Lammert
Assistant Coach	(Australia) Goran Stajic
Assistant Coach	(Australia) Tim Palmer
Goalkeeping Coach	(Australia) Liam Dedini
Team Manager	(Australia) Jenny Le

=== Managers ===
Name	Period	Honours	Ref.
(Australia) Russell Marriott	1998 - 2006	Summer Paralympic games qualification: 2000 Highest finish in CPISRA World Championships: 5th	
(Australia) Paul Brown	2006 - 2013	Highest finish in CPISRA World Championships: 8th	
(Australia) Kai Lammert	2013 -	Highest finish in IFCPF World Championships: 10th	

== Competitive results ==
Updated as of 22 May 2022.

=== Paralympic Games ===
Paralympic Games record
Year	Result	Position	Pld	W	D	L	GF	GA
(United States) 1984	did not participate							
(South Korea) 1988	did not participate							
(Spain) 1992	did not participate							
(United States) 1996	did not participate							
(Australia) 2000	Group stage	7th	3	0	0	3	0	8
(Greece) 2004	did not qualify							
(China) 2008	did not qualify							
(United Kingdom) 2012	did not qualify							
(Brazil) 2016	did not qualify							
Total		0 Titles	3	0	0	3	0	8

=== CPISRA World Championships ===
CPISRA World Championships record
Year	Result	Position	Pld	W	D	L	GF	GA
(England) 2001	5th - 6th Playoff	5th	7	4	1	2	12	8
(Brazil) 2007	11th - 12th Playoff	11th	6	3	0	3	17	13
(Netherlands) 2009	7th - 8th Playoff	8th	6	1	0	5	8	42
(Netherlands) 2011	11th - 12th Playoff	11th	6	3	0	3	15	30
(Spain) 2013	13th - 14th Playoff	13th	6	2	0	4	4	10
Total		0 Titles	31	13	1	17	56	103

=== IFCPF CP Football World Championships ===
IFCPF CP Football World Championships record
Year	Result	Position	Pld	W	D	L	GF	GA
(England) 2015	11th - 12th Playoff	12th	5	1	1	3	4	15
(Argentina) 2017	9th - 10th Playoff	10th	6	3	0	3	8	19
Total		0 Titles	11	4	1	6	12	34

=== IFCPF Men's World Cup ===
IFCPF CP Football World Championships record
Year	Result	Position	Pld	W	D	L	GF	GA
(Spain) 2019	11th - 12th Playoff	11th	6	3	0	3	13	15
(Spain) 2022	11th - 12th Playoff	11th	4	1	1	2	6	11
Total		0 Titles	10	4	1	5	19	26

== IFCPF Ranking ==
Updated as of 22 May 2022.

View source data.
A line chart depicting the history of the Australian Paralympic soccer teams IFCPF ranking from 2015 - 2022

Best Ranking Worst Ranking Best Mover Worst Mover

Australia Paralympic soccer team ranking
Rank	Year	Move	Ref.
10	2022		
10	2021		
10	2020		
10	2019	▲6	
16	2018	▼1	
15	2017	▼1	
14	2016	▼4	
10	2015		
10	2014		

== ParaMatildas ==
ParaMatildas is the Australian national football team for women with cerebral palsy, acquired brain injury and symptoms of stroke. They won silver at the 2022 International Federation of Cerebral Palsy Football Women's World Cup, with USA winning in extra time.
