= Finland national cerebral palsy football team =

- Federation: Finnish Sports Association of Persons with Disabilities
- IFCPF ranking: 21
- Highest IFCPF ranking: 16 (July 2011, September 2012)
- Lowest IFCPF ranking: 21 (2016)

Finland national cerebral palsy football team is the national cerebral football team for Finland that represents the team in international competitions. Finland has participated in a number of international tournaments, but never the Paralympic Games. At the 2011 IFCPF World Championships, the team finished fifteenth in a sixteen deep field.

== Background ==
The Finnish Sports Association of Persons with Disabilities manages the national team. While Finland was active in participating in international regional competitions by 2016, the country did not have a national championships to support national team player development.

== Ranking ==
Finland was ranked 21st in the world by the IFCPF in 2016. In November 2014, Finland was ranked 18th. In August 2013, the team was 17th. In July 2011 and September 2012, the team was 16th.

== Results ==
The country has never participated in a Paralympic Games since the sport made its debut at the 1984 Games. Finland has participated in a number of international tournaments.

Competition	Location	Year	Total Teams	Result	Ref
IFCPF World Championships Qualification Tournament	Vejen, Denmark	2016			
Northern European Open Championship	Denmark	2015	4		
Euro Football 7-a-side	Maia, Portugal	2014	11	11	

=== IFCPF World Championships ===
Finland has participated in the IFCPF World Championships. At the 2011 CP-ISRA World Championship in Drenthe, Finland lost to Canada 0 - 6.

World Championships	Location	Total Teams	Result	Ref
2011 CPSIRA World Championships	Netherlands	16	15	
