= Bryce Boarman =

American Paralympic soccer player

Personal information
- Nationality: United States
- Born: August 29, 1990 (age 35)
- Height: 1.8288 m (6 ft 0 in)
- Weight: 160 lb (73 kg)

Sport
- Sport: Soccer / Cerebral palsy soccer

Achievements and titles
- Paralympic finals: 2012 Summer Paralympics
Medal record
Paralympic 7-a-side football
2010 Americas Championship
Silver medal – second place	Team	Men's
America's Cup
Bronze medal – third place	2014	Men's
- Updated on 18 June 2016

Bryce Boarman (born August 29, 1990) is an American Paralympic soccer player. Boarman has cerebral palsy, and attended the University of Colorado Colorado Springs and University of Northern Colorado.

Boarman took up soccer when he was 6 years old. Boarman got involved with Paralympic soccer in 2008, but missed out on the Paralympic Games because the US failed to qualify. He then went on to represent the US at the 2009 CPISRA World Championships, 2011 CPISRA World Championships, the 2012 Summer Paralympics, the 2015 CPISRA World Championships and the 2015 Parapan American Games. He has over 60 caps for the US national team.

== Personal ==
Boarman is from Colorado Springs, Colorado. When he was a baby, he was diagnosed as having cerebral palsy. He graduated from University of Colorado Colorado Springs in December 2013 with a degree in sports management. He then enrolled at University of Northern Colorado to pursue a graduate degree.

Boarman started playing soccer when he was 6 years old.

== Cerebral palsy football ==
Boarman is a CP5 classified footballer, serving as a defender when playing for the national team. Boarman has over 60 caps for the USPNT.

When Paralympic sportspeople in the United States first recognized his talent, they tried to recruit him for athletics. After he expressed more interest in soccer, they put him in touch with the USPNT who then went on to invite him to a national team training tryout. After the 2008, Boarman was a selected to the USPNT later that year. The team was unable to qualify for the Beijing 2008 Paralympic Games. He went on to attend the Beijing Games as a spectator. He participated in a training camp in October 2008 in California.

In 2009, Boarman was again with the USPNT, this time for the 2011 CPISRA World Championships where the United States finished eleventh. The following year, he was part of the silver medal-winning US side at the 2010 Americas Championship.

Boarman was a member of the US team that participated in the 2011 CPISRA World Championships. They finished eighth. In 2012, he was one of three members of the USPNT to be get funding assistance from the Challenged Athlete Foundation. He was with the United States team at the 2012 Summer Paralympics. On the day of the opening ceremonies in London, Boarman celebrated his 22nd birthday. The United States was drawn in Group B with Ukraine, Great Britain and Brazil. Their opener was against reigning Paralympic gold medal winners Ukraine. They lost to Great Britain 0 - 4 during group play. Two generations of his family traveled to London to watch him play.

Boarman was one of four defenders who participated in a national team training camp in March 2013 at the U.S. Olympic Training Center in Chula Vista, California. For the 2013 Intercontinental Cup, Boarman was again part of the US squad. His team finished eighth.

In April 2014, he was invited to participate in a week long national team training camp at the Olympic Training Center in Chula Vista, California. The camp was being held in preparation for the 7-a-side Football Ciutat de Barcelona in June of that year. In 2014, he was part of the US squad that won a bronze medal at the 2014 Americas Cup. In March 2015, he was part of the 14 man roster that participated in the Povoa de Varzim, Portugal hosted Footie 7 – Povoa 2015 tournament. The competition was a warmup for the World Championships that were held in England in June 2015. He was invited to a national team training camp that took place from April 29 to May 6, 2015, in Carson, California. This camp was in preparation for the 2015 Cerebral Palsy Football World Championships in June of that year in England.

Participating at the 2015 World Championships, Boarman scored a goal in the US's game 3–0 victory against Venezuela. He was a starter in the team's 10 - 0 loss to England. He came in as a sub in the USA's 2 - 1 win against Scotland.

Boarman was part of the 14 man squad that represented the United States at the 2015 Parapan American Games in Toronto. There, the United States played Canada, Venezuela, Argentina and Brazil. He took part in a national team training camp in Chula Vista, California in early March 2016. He was part of the USPNT that took part in the 2016 Pre Paralympic Tournament in Salou, Spain. The United States finished 6th after beating Argentina in one placement match 4 - 3 and losing to Ireland 4 - 1. The goals scored in the match against Argentina were the first the USA scored in the tournament, before putting up one more in their match against Ireland. The tournament featured 7 of the 8 teams participating in Rio. It was the last major preparation event ahead of the Rio Games for all teams participating.
