= South Korea national cerebral palsy football team =

- Federation: Korea Cerebral Palsy Football Association (KFCPF)
- IFCPF ranking: 18
- Highest IFCPF ranking: 17 (July 2011, September 2012)
- Lowest IFCPF ranking: 20 (August 2013)

South Korea national cerebral palsy football team is the national cerebral football team for South Korea that represents the team in international competitions. The country has participated at the Asian Para Games, the IFCPF World Championships and the Paralympic Games. In their only appearance at the Paralympics, the finished fourth.

== Background ==
Korea Cerebral Palsy Football Association (KFCPF) is in charge of managing the national team. While South Korea was active in participating in international regional competitions by 2016, the country did not have a national championships to support national team player development. National team development is supported by an International Federation of Cerebral Palsy Football (IFCPF) recognized national championship. Recognized years for the national IFCPF recognized competition include 2013, 2014, and 2015 .

== Players ==
There have been a number of players for the Korean squad.

| Name | Number | Classification | Position | Years active | Ref |
|---|---|---|---|---|---|
| Changwook Chae | | FT7 | | 2016 | |
| Sang Pil Cho | | FT6 | | 2016 | |
| Yongseok Choi | | FT7 | | 2016 | |
| Beom-Jun Choi | | FT7 | | 2016 | |
| Sung-Min Doo | | FT7 | | 2016 | |
| Kyeongkuk Gu | | FT7 | | 2016 | |
| Chi-Yoon Heo | | FT6 | | 2016 | |
| Taekyeong Hwang | | FT7 | | 2016 | |
| Jungho Jang | | FT6 | | 2016 | |
| Doyoung Jang | | FT7 | | 2016 | |
| Do-Hyun Jeong | | FT7 | | 2016 | |
| Phillip Jung | | FT8 | | 2016 | |
| Seungnam Kang | | FT6 | | 2016 | |
| Hyung Soo Kim | | FT6 | | 2016 | |
| Sang-Yul Kim | | FT7 | | 2016 | |
| Jae Young Kim | | FT6 | | 2016 | |
| Dongjae Kim | | FT7 | | 2016 | |
| Sunshwa Kwon | | FT7 | | 2016 | |
| Dong-U Lee | | FT7 | | 2016 | |
| Hun-Ju Lee | | FT6 | | 2016 | |
| Hyoungjun Lee | | FT7 | | 2016 | |
| Seung-Hwan Lee | | FT7 | | 2016 | |
| Kyung Seok Oh | | FT6 | | 2016 | |
| Hyeonseok Oh | | FT6 | | 2016 | |
| Haecheol Park | | FT7 | | 2016 | |
| Jung-Deuk Park | | FT6 | | 2016 | |
| Seung Mok Park | | FT7 | | 2016 | |
| Park Seounghun | | FT6 | | 2016 | |
| Hyseseong Son | | FT5 | | 2016 | |
| Kinam Kim | | FT7 | | 2016 | |
| Junchul Shin | | FT6 | | 2016 | |
| Suam Park | | FT7 | | 2016 | |

== Ranking ==
South Korea was ranked eighteenth in the world by the IFCPF in 2016. The team was also ranked fourth regionally in Asia-Oceania that year. South Korea was ranked nineteenth in November 2014. In August 2013, they were ranked twentieth. In July 2011 and September 2012, they were seventeenth.

== Results ==
South Korea has participated in a number of international tournaments. The team was scheduled to participate in the 2016 IFCPF Qualification Tournament World Championships in Vejen, Denmark in early August. The tournament was part of the qualifying process for the 2017 IFCPF World Championships. Other teams scheduled to participate included Scotland, Canada, Portugal, Iran, Northern Ireland, Australia, Venezuela, Japan, Germany, Denmark, and Spain.

| Competition | Location | Year | Total Teams | Result | Ref |
|---|---|---|---|---|---|
| IFCPF World Championships Qualification Tournament | Vejen, Denmark | 2016 | | | |
| Asian Para Games | Incheon, South Korea | 2014 | 4 | 3 | |

=== IFCPF World Championships ===
South Korea has participated in the IFCPF World Championships. At the 2011 edition, South Korea won the Fair Play Cup.

| World Championships | Location | Total Teams | Result | Ref |
|---|---|---|---|---|
| 2011 CPSIRA World Championships | Netherlands | 16 | 16 | |

=== Paralympic Games ===
South Korea has participated in 7-a-side football at the Paralympic Games.

Paralympic Results

| Games | Results | Ref |
|---|---|---|
| 1988 Summer Paralympics | 4 | |
