= Japan national cerebral palsy football team =

Japanese cerebral palsy football team

- Federation: Japan Cerebral Palsy Football Association
- IFCPF ranking: 16
- Highest IFCPF ranking: 13 (July 2011, September 2012, November 2014)
- Lowest IFCPF ranking: 16 (2016)

Japan national cerebral palsy football team is the national cerebral football team for Japan that represents the team in international competitions. The team has been active in recent years, and was ranked 16th in the world in 2016. At the 2015 IFCPF World Championships, they finished fifteenth. At the 2014 Asian Para Games, they finished second. Japan has never competed at the Paralympic Games.

== Background ==
Japan Cerebral Palsy Football Association is in charge of managing the national team. While Japan was active in participating in the IFCPF World Championships by 2016, the country did not have a national championships to support national team player development.

National team development is supported by an International Federation of Cerebral Palsy Football (IFCPF) recognized national championship. Recognized years for the national IFCPF recognized competition include 2010, 2011, 2012, 2013, 2014, and 2015.

In 2016, after getting an endorsement by the World AntiDoping Agency (WADA), the IFCPF Anti-Doping Code was formally amended to allow for out of competition testing. This was done through a WADA approved Whereabouts Programme managed through ADAMS. Drawing from players in a Registered Testing Pool, players from this country were included ahead of the 2016 Summer Paralympics in Rio.

== Ranking ==
Japan was ranked sixteenth in the world by the IFCPF in 2016. The team is also ranked third regionally in Asia-Oceania. Japan was ranked thirteenth in July 2011, September 2012 and November 2014. In August 2013, Japan was ranked fourteenth.

== Results ==
The country has never participated in a Paralympic Games since the sport made its debut at the 1984 Games. Japan has participated in a number of international tournaments. Japan finished second at the 2014 Asian Para Games after losing 0 - 5 to Iran in the final.

The team was scheduled to participate in the 2016 IFCPF Qualification Tournament World Championships in Vejen, Denmark in early August. The tournament was part of the qualifying process for the 2017 IFCPF World Championships. Other teams scheduled to participate included Scotland, Canada, Portugal, Iran, Northern Ireland, Australia, Venezuela, Republic of South Korea, Germany, Denmark, and Spain.

Competition	Location	Year	Total Teams	Result	Ref
CPISRA World Games	Nottingham, England	2015	7	7	
Asian Para Games	Incheon, South Korea	2014	4	2	
Intercontinental Cup	Barcelona, Spain	2013	16		
CPISRA International Championships	Arnhem, Netherlands	2009	11		

=== IFCPF World Championships ===
Japan has participated in the IFCPF World Championships.

World Championships	Location	Total Teams	Result	Ref
2015 IFCPF World Championships	England	15	15	
2011 CPSIRA World Championships	Netherlands	16	13	
