= Swimming at the 2004 Summer Paralympics – Men's 100 metre freestyle S13 =

Men's 100m Freestyle S13 at the XII Paralympic Games
- Paralympic Swimming
- Venue: Olympic Aquatic Centre
- Dates: 22 September 2004
- Competitors: 14 from 12 nations
- Winning time: 55.27

Medalists
1st place, gold medalist(s)		Andrey Strokin	Russia
2nd place, silver medalist(s)		Scott Field	South Africa
3rd place, bronze medalist(s)		Daniel Clausner	Germany

The Men's 100 metre freestyle S13 swimming event at the 2004 Summer Paralympics was competed on 22 September. It was won by Andrey Strokin, representing Russia.

== 1st round ==
Qualified for final round

Heat 1

22 Sept. 2004, morning session

Rank	Athlete	Time	Notes
1	Scott Field (RSA)	57.29	
2	Daniel Sharp (NZL)	58.64	
3	Dervis Konuralp (GBR)	1:00.23	
4	Anton Ganzha (UKR)	1:00.31	
5	Tyler Emmett (CAN)	1:00.86	
6	Luis Arevalo (ESP)	1:02.62	
7	Dmytro Korneyev (UKR)	1:02.93	

Heat 2

22 Sept. 2004, morning session

Rank	Athlete	Time	Notes
1	Andrey Strokin (RUS)	57.54	
2	Daniel Clausner (GER)	58.01	
3	Brian Hill (CAN)	59.45	
4	David Rangel (VEN)	59.92	
5	Martin Stepanek (CZE)	1:00.66	
6	Shusaku Sugiuchi (JPN)	1:00.85	
7	Andrea Palantrani (ITA)	1:01.95	

== Final round ==
22 Sept. 2004, evening session

Rank	Athlete	Time	Notes
1st place, gold medalist(s)	Andrey Strokin (RUS)	55.27	PR
2nd place, silver medalist(s)	Scott Field (RSA)	55.36	
3rd place, bronze medalist(s)	Daniel Clausner (GER)	56.69	
4	Daniel Sharp (NZL)	58.76	
5	Brian Hill (CAN)	59.32	
6	David Rangel (VEN)	1:00.23	
7	Dervis Konuralp (GBR)	1:01.09	
8	Anton Ganzha (UKR)	1:01.98	
