= Swimming at the 2004 Summer Paralympics – Men's 50 metre freestyle S13 =

Men's 50m Freestyle S13 at the XII Paralympic Games
- Paralympic Swimming
- Venue: Olympic Aquatic Centre
- Dates: 27 September 2004
- Competitors: 14 from 12 nations
- Winning time: 24.88

Medalists
1st place, gold medalist(s)		Andrey Strokin	Russia
2nd place, silver medalist(s)		Charalampos Taiganidis	Greece
3rd place, bronze medalist(s)		Scott Field	South Africa

The Men's 50 metre freestyle S13 swimming event at the 2004 Summer Paralympics was competed on 27 September. It was won by Andrey Strokin, representing Russia.

== 1st round ==
Qualified for final round

Heat 1

27 Sept. 2004, morning session

Rank	Athlete	Time	Notes
1	Daniel Clausner (GER)	25.95	
2	Andrey Strokin (RUS)	26.28	
3	Anton Ganzha (UKR)	26.97	
4	Martin Stepanek (CZE)	27.36	
5	Andrea Palantrani (ITA)	27.39	
6	Shusaku Sugiuchi (JPN)	27.44	
7	Brian Hill (CAN)	28.09	

Heat 2

27 Sept. 2004, morning session

Rank	Athlete	Time	Notes
1	Charalampos Taiganidis (GRE)	24.90	
2	Scott Field (RSA)	25.54	
3	Daniel Sharp (NZL)	26.53	
4	Dervis Konuralp (GBR)	26.95	
5	Tyler Emmett (CAN)	27.30	
6	David Rangel (VEN)	27.56	
7	Dmytro Korneyev (UKR)	27.71	

== Final round ==
27 Sept. 2004, evening session

Rank	Athlete	Time	Notes
1st place, gold medalist(s)	Andrey Strokin (RUS)	24.88	
2nd place, silver medalist(s)	Charalampos Taiganidis (GRE)	24.97	
3rd place, bronze medalist(s)	Scott Field (RSA)	25.48	
4	Daniel Clausner (GER)	25.77	
5	Daniel Sharp (NZL)	26.34	
6	Anton Ganzha (UKR)	26.70	
7	Dervis Konuralp (GBR)	26.72	
8	Tyler Emmett (CAN)	27.20	
