= List of IPC world records in swimming – Men's short course =

The world records in disability swimming are ratified by the International Paralympic Committee (IPC). These are the fastest performances in swimming events at meets sanctioned by the IPC.

This article lists the men's world records in short course competition. The International Paralympic Committee provides information on the current world records at their official site, though the times present sometimes differ from those provided elsewhere.

== 50 m freestyle ==
Event	Class	Time		Name	Nation	Date	Meet	Location	Ref
50 m freestyle	S1	1:17.19		Francesco Bettella	Italy	26 November 2022	-	Fabriano, Italy	
50 m freestyle	S2	1:00.39		Jacek Czech	Poland	20 February 2016	-	Södertälje, Sweden	
50 m freestyle	S2	55.77	ratified but later rescinded	Curtis Lovejoy	United States	2009	World Championships	Rio de Janeiro, Brazil	
50 m freestyle	S3	42.65		Gabriele Lorenzo	Italy	20 December 2025	-	Madrid, Spain	
50 m freestyle	S4	37.50		Cameron Leslie	New Zealand	8 October 2020	-	Hamilton, New Zealand	
50 m freestyle	S5	31.51		Antonio Fantin	Italy	1 December 2018	-	Loano, Italy	
50 m freestyle	S6	29.09		Thijs van Hofweegen	Netherlands	18 December 2022	-	The Hague, Netherlands	
50 m freestyle	S7	27.28		Matthew Walker	Great Britain	2 December 2009	World Championships	Rio de Janeiro, Brazil	
50 m freestyle	S8	26.09		Peter Leek	Australia	17 July 2010	-	Sydney, Australia	
50 m freestyle	S9	24.28		Simone Barlaam	Italy	13 November 2022	-	Lodi, Italy	
50 m freestyle	S10	22.44		André Brasil	Brazil	3 December 2009	World Championships	Rio de Janeiro, Brazil	
50 m freestyle	S11	25.24		Rogier Dorsman	Netherlands	21 December 2025	-	The Hague, Netherlands	
50 m freestyle	S12	23.86		Alexander Nevolin-Svetov	Russia	2 December 2009	World Championships	Rio de Janeiro, Brazil	
50 m freestyle	S13	23.14		Alex Portal	France	10 December 2023	-	Saint-Nazaire, France	

Legend: # – Record awaiting ratification by IPC; e – equalled existing record;
Records not set in finals: h – heat; sf – semifinal; b – B final; † – en route to final mark; so – swim-off

== 100 m freestyle ==
Event	Class	Time	Name	Nation	Date	Meet	Location	Ref
100 m freestyle	S1	3:51.88	Miguel Navarro Riofrio	Spain	21 December 2025	-	Madrid, Spain	
100 m freestyle	S2	2:18.15	Dmitrii Kokarev	Russia	1 December 2009	World Championships	Rio de Janeiro, Brazil	
100 m freestyle	S3	1:33.86	Gabriele Lorenzo	Italy	21 December 2025	-	Madrid, Spain	
100 m freestyle	S4	1:22.98	Richard Oribe Lumbreras	Spain	3 December 2009	World Championships	Rio de Janeiro, Brazil	
100 m freestyle	S5	1:07.54	Antonio Fantin	Italy	2 December 2018	-	Loano, Italy	
100 m freestyle	S6	1:03.86	Antonio Fantin	Italy	26 November 2023	-	Ostia, Italy	
100 m freestyle	S7	1:00.14	Federico Bicelli	Italy	28 November 2021	-	Riccione, Italy	
100 m freestyle	S8	57.21	Peter Leek	Australia	4 December 2009	World Championships	Rio de Janeiro, Brazil	
100 m freestyle	S9	52.77	Rowan Crothers	Australia	7 November 2014	Australian Championships	Adelaide, Australia	
100 m freestyle	S10	48.70	André Brasil	Brazil	5 December 2009	World Championships	Rio de Janeiro, Brazil	
100 m freestyle	S11	56.03	David Kratochvil	Czechia	29 March 2025	-	Sokolov, Czech Republic	
100 m freestyle	S12	51.99	Alexander Nevolin-Svetov	Russia	5 December 2009	World Championships	Rio de Janeiro, Brazil	
100 m freestyle	S13	50.14	Alex Portal	France	10 December 2023	-	Saint Nazaire, France	
100 m freestyle	S14	51.11	Jack Ireland	Australia	15 September 2023	-	Sydney, Australia	

Legend: # – Record awaiting ratification by IPC; e – equalled existing record;
Records not set in finals: h – heat; sf – semifinal; b – B final; † – en route to final mark; so – swim-off

== 200 m freestyle ==
Event	Class	Time	Name	Nation	Date	Meet	Location	Ref
200 m freestyle	S1	7:40.97	Miguel Navarro	Spain	21 December 2025	-	Madrid, Spain	
200 m freestyle	S2	4:45.73	Dmitrii Kokarev	Russia	1 December 2009	World Championships	Rio de Janeiro, Brazil	
200 m freestyle	S3	3:20.23	Gabriele Lorenzo	Italy	21 December 2025	-	Madrid, Spain	
200 m freestyle	S4	2:53.61	Federico Cristiani	Italy	21 December 2025	-	Madrid, Spain	
200 m freestyle	S5	2:29.85	Daniel Dias	Brazil	5 December 2009	World Championships	Rio de Janeiro, Brazil	
200 m freestyle	S6	2:16.95	Anders Olsson	Sweden	11 February 2006	-	Malmö, Sweden	
200 m freestyle	S7	2:11.99	Federico Bicelli	Italy	13 November 2022	-	Lodi, Italy	
200 m freestyle	S8	2:04.09	Alberto Amodeo	Italy	21 December 2025	-	Madrid, Spain	
200 m freestyle	S9	1:55.77	Simone Barlaam	Italy	13 November 2022	-	Lodi, Italy	
200 m freestyle	S10	1:49.93	Rowan Crothers	Australia	29 September 2026	Australian Championships	Sydney, Australia	
200 m freestyle	S11	2:07.26	Rogier Dorsman	Netherlands	4 December 2021	-	The Hague, Netherlands	
200 m freestyle	S12	2:03.28	Rogier Dorsman	Netherlands	21 December 2018	-	Tilburg, Netherlands	
200 m freestyle	S13	1:54.73	Thomas van Wanrooij	Netherlands	16 December 2023	-	The Hague, Netherlands	
200 m freestyle	S14	1:49.49	William Ellard	Great Britain	11 December 2025	-	Sheffield, United Kingdom	

Legend: # – Record awaiting ratification by IPC; e – equalled existing record;
Records not set in finals: h – heat; sf – semifinal; b – B final; † – en route to final mark; so – swim-off

== 400 m freestyle ==
Event	Class	Time	Name	Nation	Date	Meet	Location	Ref
400 m freestyle	S6	4:42.64	Anders Olsson	Sweden	29 November 2009	World Championships	Rio de Janeiro, Brazil	
400 m freestyle	S7	4:32.38	Josef Craig	Great Britain	24 November 2013	-	Sheffield, United Kingdom	
400 m freestyle	S8	4:20.18	Samuel Hynd	Great Britain	2009	World Championships	Rio de Janeiro, Brazil	
400 m freestyle	S9	4:06.26	Rowan Crothers	Australia	5 November 2014	-	Adelaide, Australia	
400 m freestyle	S10	3:54.57	André Brasil	Brazil	2 December 2009	World Championships	Rio de Janeiro, Brazil	
400 m freestyle	S11	4:25.27	David Kratochvil	Czechia	29 March 2025	-	Sokolov, Czech Republic	
400 m freestyle	S12	4:05.05	Braedan Jason	Australia	27 November 2020	-	Brisbane, Australia	
400 m freestyle	S13	3:48.68	Alex Portal	France	9 December 2023	-	Saint Nazaire, France	
400 m freestyle	S14	3:55.11	William Ellard	Great Britain	11 December 2025	-	Sheffield, United Kingdom	

Legend: # – Record awaiting ratification by IPC; e – equalled existing record;
Records not set in finals: h – heat; sf – semifinal; b – B final; † – en route to final mark; so – swim-off

== 800 m freestyle ==
Event	Class	Time	Name	Nation	Date	Meet	Location	Ref
800 m freestyle	S6	9:51.42	Anders Olsson	Sweden	2 May 2008	-	Oslo, Norway	
800 m freestyle	S7	10:02.55	Andreas Skår Bjørnstad	Norway	22 October 2017	-	Oslo, Norway	
800 m freestyle	S8	9:39.48	Zach Zona	Canada	29 November 2019	-	Montreal, Canada	
800 m freestyle	S9	8:47.66	Jacobo Garrido Brun	Spain	25 January 2020	-	Valdemoro, Spain	
800 m freestyle	S10	8:23.16	Bas Takken	Netherlands	21 December 2018	-	Tilburg, Netherlands	
800 m freestyle	S11	9:15.77	David Kratochvil	Czech Republic	19 October 2024	-	Brno, Czech Republic	
800 m freestyle	S12	vacant	-	-		-		
800 m freestyle	S13	8:45.82	Thomas Van Wanrooij	Netherlands	16 December 2023	-	The Hague, Netherlands	

Legend: # – Record awaiting ratification by IPC; e – equalled existing record;
Records not set in finals: h – heat; sf – semifinal; b – B final; † – en route to final mark; so – swim-off

== 1500 m freestyle ==
Event	Class	Time		Name	Nation	Date	Meet	Location	Ref
1500 m freestyle	S6	18:41.95		Anders Olsson	Sweden	2 May 2008	-	Oslo, Norway	
1500 m freestyle	S7	18:46.24		Andreas Skaar Bjornstad	Norway	2 November 2018	-	Kristiansand, Norway	
1500 m freestyle	S8	18:23.70		Christoph Burkard	Germany	26 November 2011	-	Remscheid, Germany	
1500 m freestyle	S9	16:27.99		Garrido Brun Jacobo	Spain	25 January 2020	-	Valdemoro, Spain	
1500 m freestyle	S10	15:43.15		Takken Bas	Netherlands	21 December 2018	-	Tilburg, Netherlands	
1500 m freestyle	S11		vacant	-	-	-			
1500 m freestyle	S12	16:34.60		Enrique Floriano Millan	Spain	2 May 2003	-	Palma de Mallorca, Spain	
1500 m freestyle	S13	16:45.15		Enrique Floriano Millan	Spain	25 May 2001	-	Gijón, Spain	

Legend: # – Record awaiting ratification by IPC; e – equalled existing record;
Records not set in finals: h – heat; sf – semifinal; b – B final; † – en route to final mark; so – swim-off

== 50 m backstroke ==
Event	Class	Time	Name	Nation	Date	Meet	Location	Ref
50 m backstroke	S1	1:14.79	Francesco Bettella	Italy	1 April 2017	-	Naples, Italy	
50 m backstroke	S2	1:06.12	James Anderson	Great Britain	28 August 2004	-	Manchester, United Kingdom	
50 m backstroke	S3	46.37	Josia Topf	Germany	18 November 2023	-	Düsseldorf, Germany	
50 m backstroke	S4	43.38	Cameron Leslie	New Zealand	9 October 2020	-	Hamilton, New Zealand	
50 m backstroke	S5	35.06	Daniel Dias	Brazil	2 December 2009	World Championships	Rio de Janeiro, Brazil	
50 m backstroke	S6	34.32	Thijs Van Hofweegen	Netherlands	17 December 2022	-	The Hague, Netherlands	
50 m backstroke	S7	33.57	Federico Bicelli	Italy	25 November 2023	-	Ostia (Rome), Italy	
50 m backstroke	S8	30.67	Konstantin Lisenkov	Russia	29 November 2009	World Championships	Rio de Janeiro, Brazil	
50 m backstroke	S9	27.64	Simone Barlaam	Italy	30 November 2019	-	Portici, Italy	
50 m backstroke	S10	26.97	Michael James Anderson	Australia	28 November 2015	-	Sydney, Australia	
50 m backstroke	S11	30.03	David Kratochvil	Czech Republic	29 March 2025	-	Sokolov, Czech Republic	
50 m backstroke	S12	26.54	Stephen Clegg	Great Britain	28 October 2022	-	Stavanger, Norway	
50 m backstroke	S13	26.27	Thomas Van Wanrooij	Netherlands	24 October 2026	-	Rotterdam, Netherlands	

Legend: # – Record awaiting ratification by IPC; e – equalled existing record;
Records not set in finals: h – heat; sf – semifinal; b – B final; † – en route to final mark; so – swim-off

== 100 m backstroke ==
Event	Class	Time	Name	Nation	Date	Meet	Location	Ref
100 m backstroke	S1	2:37.33	Francesco Bettella	Italy	1 April 2017	-	Naples, Italy	
100 m backstroke	S2	2:16.53	Jacek Czech	Poland	20 February 2016	-	Södertälje, Sweden	
100 m backstroke	S3	1:45.96	Vincenzo Boni	Italy	1 December 2018	-	Loano, Italy	
100 m backstroke	S4	1:49.56	Ivan Fernandez	Spain	26 January 2019	-	Pozuelo de Alarcon, Spain	
100 m backstroke	S5	1:14.10	Daniel de Faria Diaz	Brazil	5 December 2009	World Championships	Rio de Janeiro, Brazil	
100 m backstroke	S6	1:14.52	Igor Plotnikov	Russia	30 November 2009	World Championships	Rio de Janeiro, Brazil	
100 m backstroke	S7	1:07.99	Jonathan Fox	Great Britain	10 December 2017	-	Manchester, United Kingdom	
100 m backstroke	S8	1:03.18	Peter Leek	Australia	29 November 2009	World Championships	Rio de Janeiro, Brazil	
100 m backstroke	S9	57.93	Matthew Cowdrey	Australia	4 December 2009	World Championships	Rio de Janeiro, Brazil	
100 m backstroke	S10	57.29	André Brasil	Brazil	4 December 2009	World Championships	Rio de Janeiro, Brazil	
100 m backstroke	S11	1:06.11	Rogier Dorsman	Netherlands	15 December 2023	-	The Hague, Netherlands	
100 m backstroke	S12	57.54	Alexander Nevolin-Svetov	Russia	4 December 2009	World Championships	Rio de Janeiro, Brazil	
100 m backstroke	S13	56.23	Thomas Van Wanrooij	Netherlands	23 October 2026	-	Rotterdam, Netherlands	
100 m backstroke	S14	55.91	William Ellard	Great Britain	12 December 2025	-	Sheffield, United Kingdom	

Legend: # – Record awaiting ratification by IPC; e – equalled existing record;
Records not set in finals: h – heat; sf – semifinal; b – B final; † – en route to final mark; so – swim-off

== 200 m backstroke ==
Event	Class	Time	Name	Nation	Date	Meet	Location	Ref
200 m backstroke	S6	2:42.81	Adam Purdy	Canada	3 February 2002	-	Sudbury, Canada	
200 m backstroke	S7	2:43.54	Hannes Schürmann	Germany	18 November 2017	German Para Championships	Remscheid, Germany	
200 m backstroke	S8	2:36.73	Gert-Jan Schep	Netherlands	24 Mar 2007	Aalsmeer, Netherlands		
200 m backstroke	S9	2:21.88	Brad Sales	Canada	22 Feb 2004	Halifax Regional Municipality, Canada		
200 m backstroke	S10	2:15.20	Benoît Huot	Canada	26 Apr 2008	Montreal, Canada		
200 m backstroke	S11	2:54.85	Javier Goni	Spain	26 Mar 2006	Cuenca, Spain		
200 m backstroke	S12	2:18.22	Enrique Floriano Millan	Spain	9 Apr 2005	Tarragona, Spain		
200 m backstroke	S13	2:16.13	Brian Hill	Canada	1 Dec 2001	Richmond, Canada		

Legend: # – Record awaiting ratification by IPC; e – equalled existing record;
Records not set in finals: h – heat; sf – semifinal; b – B final; † – en route to final mark; so – swim-off

== 50 m breaststroke ==
Event	Class	Time	Name	Nation	Date	Meet	Location	Ref
50 m breaststroke	SB1	1:37.97	David Lega	Sweden	14 Sep 1997	Nyköping, Sweden		
50 m breaststroke	SB2	1:07.07	Adam Morley	Great Britain	18 Jun 1994	Darlington, United Kingdom		
50 m breaststroke	SB3	50.30	Christian Fritsche	Germany	22 Nov 2003	Chemnitz, Germany		
50 m breaststroke	SB4	47.73	Ricardo Ten Argiles	Spain	3 Nov 2007	Sheffield, United Kingdom		
50 m breaststroke	SB5	41.84	Tadhg Slattery	South Africa	31 Jul 2003	Petermaritzburg, South Africa		
50 m breaststroke	SB6	42.43	Gareth Duke	Great Britain	21 May 2005	Hatfield, United Kingdom		
50 m breaststroke	SB7	36.86	Blake Cochrane	Australia	14 Jul 2010	Brisbane, Australia		
50 m breaststroke	SB8	34.29	Sam Hynd	Great Britain	1 Nov 2008	Sheffield, United Kingdom		
50 m breaststroke	SB9	31.99	Claus Taudorf	Denmark	23 Apr 2006	Esbjerg, Denmark		
50 m breaststroke	SB11	34.64	Christian Bundgaard	Denmark	26 Mar 2006	Esbjerg, Denmark		
50 m breaststroke	SB12	32.32	Kingsley Bugarin	Australia	2 Sep 1999	Canberra, Australia		
50 m breaststroke	SB13	30.52	Daniel Sharp	New Zealand	23 Aug 2008	Auckland, New Zealand		

Legend: # – Record awaiting ratification by IPC; e – equalled existing record;
Records not set in finals: h – heat; sf – semifinal; b – B final; † – en route to final mark; so – swim-off

== 100 m breaststroke ==
Event	Class	Time	Name	Nation	Date	Meet	Location	Ref
100 m breaststroke	SB1							
100 m breaststroke	SB2	2:18.71	Grant Patterson	Australia	17 Jul 2010	Brisbane, Australia		
100 m breaststroke	SB3	1:49.78	Ahmed Kelly	Australia	17 Jul 2010	Brisbane, Australia		
100 m breaststroke	SB4	1:41.73	Ricardo Ten Argiles	Spain	17 Mar 2007	Plasencia, Spain		
100 m breaststroke	SB5	1:31.77	Tadhg Slattery	South Africa	2 Aug 2003	Pietermaritzburg, South Africa		
100 m breaststroke	SB6	1:30.47	Gareth Duke	Great Britain	21 May 2005	Hatfield, United Kingdom		
100 m breaststroke	SB7	1:20.74	Sascha Kindred	Great Britain	26 Aug 2004	Manchester, United Kingdom		
100 m breaststroke	SB8	1:13.79	Krzysztof Paterka	Poland	19 Mar 2005	Tychy, Poland		
100 m breaststroke	SB9	1:09.13	Rick Francis Pendleton	Australia	1 Sep 2007	Melbourne, Australia		
100 m breaststroke	SB11	1:15.32	Christian Bundgaard	Denmark	1 Nov 2008	Sheffield, United Kingdom		
100 m breaststroke	SB12	1:08.93	Kingsley Bugarin	Australia	3 Sep 1999	Canberra, Australia		
100 m breaststroke	SB13	1:05.16	Daniel Sharp	New Zealand	29 September 2013	New Zealand State Championships	Wellington, New Zealand	

Legend: # – Record awaiting ratification by IPC; e – equalled existing record;
Records not set in finals: h – heat; sf – semifinal; b – B final; † – en route to final mark; so – swim-off

== 200 m breaststroke ==
Event	Class	Time		Name	Nation	Date	Meet	Location	Ref
200 m breaststroke	SB4	5:32.26		Julian Chryssavgis	United States	7 Jul 2005			
200 m breaststroke	SB5	3:20.00		Tadhg Slattery	South Africa	3 Aug 2003	Pietermaritzburg, South Africa		
200 m breaststroke	SB6	3:28.49		Bjarki Birgisson	Iceland	21 Jan 2001	Kópavogur, Iceland		
200 m breaststroke	SB7	3:15.26		Michael Ardern	New Zealand	24 Aug 2008	Auckland, New Zealand		
200 m breaststroke	SB8	2:50.10		Sam Hynd	Great Britain	9 Feb 2008	Nottingham, United Kingdom		
200 m breaststroke	SB9	2:35.17		Rick Francis Pendleton	Australia	2 Jul 2006	Sydney, Australia		
200 m breaststroke	SB11	2:50.15		Christian Bundgaard	Denmark	25 Feb 1996	Madrid, Spain		
200 m breaststroke	SB12	2:27.99		Kingsley Bugarin	Australia	14 Aug 1999	Perth, Australia		
200 m breaststroke	SB13	2:28.87		Ivan Nielsen	Denmark	20 March 1999	-	Esbjerg, Denmark	
200 m breaststroke	SB13	2:28.29	not ratified	Liam Bekric	Australia	21 July 2017	-	Adelaide, Australia	
200 m breaststroke	SB14	2:28.87		Adam Ismael Wenham	Norway	18 March 2017	-	Bergen, Norway	

Legend: # – Record awaiting ratification by IPC; e – equalled existing record;
Records not set in finals: h – heat; sf – semifinal; b – B final; † – en route to final mark; so – swim-off

== 50 m butterfly ==
Event	Class	Time	Name	Nation	Date	Meet	Location	Ref
50 m butterfly	S1							
50 m butterfly	S2	1:20.40	Ales Secnik	Slovenia	5 November 2011	-	Rijeka, Croatia	
50 m butterfly	S3	1:18.82	Kenneth Cairns	Great Britain	7 Nov 1998	Darlington, United Kingdom		
50 m butterfly	S4	54.06	Christian Fritsche	Germany	23 Nov 2003	Chemnitz, Germany		
50 m butterfly	S5	44.76	Xavier Torres Ramis	Spain	8 Apr 2000	Torvalla, Sweden		
50 m butterfly	S6	33.21	Daniel Vidal Fuster	Spain	13 Dec 2003	Benicarló, Spain		
50 m butterfly	S7	33.22	Matthew Walker	Great Britain	2 Nov 2008	Sheffield, United Kingdom		
50 m butterfly	S8	27.99	Peter Alan Stuart Leek	Australia	30 Aug 2007	Melbourne, Australia		
50 m butterfly	S9	27.19	Matthew John Cowdrey	Australia	30 Aug 2007	Melbourne, Australia		
50 m butterfly	S10	26.90	Daniel Bell	Australia	30 Aug 2007	Melbourne, Australia		
50 m butterfly	S11	30.65	Matthew Cabraja	Canada	29 November 2019	-	Montreal, Canada	
50 m butterfly	S12	29.11	Juan Diego Gil Sanchez	Spain	27 Jan 2001	Palma de Mallorca, Spain		
50 m butterfly	S13	27.72	Daniel Clausner	Germany	15 Nov 2008	Chemnitz, Germany		

Legend: # – Record awaiting ratification by IPC; e – equalled existing record;
Records not set in finals: h – heat; sf – semifinal; b – B final; † – en route to final mark; so – swim-off

== 100 m butterfly ==
Event	Class	Time	Name	Nation	Date	Meet	Location	Ref
100 m butterfly	S5	1:42.93	Xavier Torres Ramis	Spain	13 Dec 2003	Benicarló, Spain		
100 m butterfly	S6	1:21.37	Peter Lund Andersen	Denmark	1 Dec 2001	Esbjerg, Denmark		
100 m butterfly	S7	1:17.00	Ritchie Barber	Great Britain	9 Nov 2002	Sheffield, United Kingdom		
100 m butterfly	S8	1:02.69	Peter Alan Stuart Leek	Australia	2 Jul 2006	Sydney, Australia		
100 m butterfly	S9	59.95	Matthew John Cowdrey	Australia	2 Sep 2007	Melbourne, Australia		
100 m butterfly	S10	59.10	Benoît Huot	Canada	25 Jan 2003	St Foy, Canada		
100 m butterfly	S11	1:08.77	Tim Reddish	Great Britain	25 Apr 1998	Eskilstuna, Sweden		
100 m butterfly	S12	1:02.11	Enrique Floriano Millan	Spain	9 Apr 2005	Tarragona, Spain		
100 m butterfly	S13	1:00.52	Brian Hill	Canada	3 Nov 2007	Sheffield, United Kingdom		
100 m butterfly	S13	1:00.52	Walter Wu	Canada	2 Mar 2002	Richmond, Canada		

Legend: # – Record awaiting ratification by IPC; e – equalled existing record;
Records not set in finals: h – heat; sf – semifinal; b – B final; † – en route to final mark; so – swim-off

== 200 m butterfly ==
Event	Class	Time	Name	Nation	Date	Meet	Location	Ref
200 m butterfly	S8	2:36.72	Emil Brondum	Denmark	25 Mar 2000	Esbjerg, Denmark		
200 m butterfly	S9	2:14.09	Matthew John Cowdrey	Australia	5 Aug 2006	Adelaide, Australia		
200 m butterfly	S10	2:17.05	James Hollis	Great Britain	4 November 2012	British Universities and College Sports Competition	Sheffield, Great Britain	
200 m butterfly	S11							
200 m butterfly	S12	2:23.51	Enrique Floriano Millan	Spain	26 Mar 2006	Cuenca, Spain		
200 m butterfly	S13	2:11.98	Michael Edgson	Canada	1992			

Legend: # – Record awaiting ratification by IPC; e – equalled existing record;
Records not set in finals: h – heat; sf – semifinal; b – B final; † – en route to final mark; so – swim-off

== 100 m individual medley ==
Event	Class	Time	Name	Nation	Date	Meet	Location	Ref
100 m individual medley	SM1							
100 m individual medley	SM2	5:22.22	Guillermo Bustamante	Argentina	3 Nov 2002	Avellaneda, Argentina		
100 m individual medley	SM3	3:55.35	Sam Hardaker	Australia	23 Aug 2003	Sydney, Australia		
100 m individual medley	SM4	1:40.01	Xavier Torres Ramis	Spain	16 Jan 2000	Deventer, Netherlands		
100 m individual medley	SM5	1:39.79	Anthony Stephens	Great Britain	18 Jan 2004	Deventer, Netherlands		
100 m individual medley	SM6	1:16.68	Sascha Kindred	Great Britain	3 Nov 2007	Sheffield, United Kingdom		
100 m individual medley	SM7	1:20.20	David Roberts	Great Britain	1 Nov 2003	Sheffield, United Kingdom		
100 m individual medley	SM8	1:09.61	Sam Hynd	Great Britain	1 Nov 2008	Sheffield, United Kingdom		
100 m individual medley	SM9	1:02.09	Matthew John Cowdrey	Australia	5 Aug 2006	Adelaide, Australia		
100 m individual medley	SM10	1:03.29	Maciej Maik	Poland	23 Mar 2003	Ptock, Poland		
100 m individual medley	SM11	1:28.72	Daniel English	Great Britain	1 Mar 2008	Sheffield, United Kingdom		
100 m individual medley	SM12	1:05.86	Juan Diego Gil Sanchez	Spain	27 Jan 2001	Palma de Mallorca, Spain		
100 m individual medley	SM13	1:02.47	Daniel Clausner	Germany	20 Jan 2008	Deventer, Netherlands		

Legend: # – Record awaiting ratification by IPC; e – equalled existing record;
Records not set in finals: h – heat; sf – semifinal; b – B final; † – en route to final mark; so – swim-off

== 150 m individual medley ==
Event	Class	Time	Name	Nation	Date	Meet	Location	Ref
150 m individual medley	SM4	2:38.86	Xavier Torres Ramis	Spain	3 Nov 2007	Sheffield, United Kingdom		

Legend: # – Record awaiting ratification by IPC; e – equalled existing record;
Records not set in finals: h – heat; sf – semifinal; b – B final; † – en route to final mark; so – swim-off

== 200 m individual medley ==
Event	Class	Time	Name	Nation	Date	Meet	Location	Ref
200 m individual medley	SM3							
200 m individual medley	SM4	3:32.07	Xavier Torres Ramis	Spain	13 Dec 2003	Benicarló, Spain		
200 m individual medley	SM5	3:13.19	Pablo Cimadevila	Spain	3 Nov 2007	Sheffield, United Kingdom		
200 m individual medley	SM6	2:42.14	Sascha Kindred	Great Britain	3 Nov 2007	Sheffield, United Kingdom		
200 m individual medley	SM7	2:47.32	David Roberts	Great Britain	27 Aug 2004	Manchester, United Kingdom		
200 m individual medley	SM8	2:21.01	Peter Alan Stuart Leek	Australia	30 Aug 2007	Melbourne, Australia		
200 m individual medley	SM9	2:11.35	Matthew John Cowdrey	Australia	30 Aug 2007	Melbourne, Australia		
200 m individual medley	SM10	2:14.20	Benoît Huot	Canada	24 Feb 2004	Halifax Regional Municipality, Canada		
200 m individual medley	SM11	2:35.06	Tim Reddish	Great Britain	27 Mar 1999	Jihlava, Czech Republic		
200 m individual medley	SM12	2:17.73	Enrique Floriano Millan	Spain	4 Nov 2006	Madrid, Spain		
200 m individual medley	SM13	2:15.52	Walter Wu	Canada	1 Mar 2002	Richmond, Canada		

Legend: # – Record awaiting ratification by IPC; e – equalled existing record;
Records not set in finals: h – heat; sf – semifinal; b – B final; † – en route to final mark; so – swim-off

== 400 m individual medley ==
Event	Class	Time	Name	Nation	Date	Meet	Location	Ref
400 m individual medley	SM8	5:39.38	Drew Christensen	Canada	21 Jan 2007	New Westminster, Canada		
400 m individual medley	SM9	4:51.91	Matthew John Cowdrey	Australia	15 Jul 2005	Adelaide, Australia		
400 m individual medley	SM10	4:55.07	Benoît Huot	Canada	5 May 2007	Montreal, Canada		
400 m individual medley	SM12	4:44.48	Enrique Floriano Millan	Spain	3 May 2003	Palma de Mallorca, Spain		
400 m individual medley	SM13	4:50.04	Enrique Floriano Millan	Spain	26 May 2001	Gijón, Spain		

Legend: # – Record awaiting ratification by IPC; e – equalled existing record;
Records not set in finals: h – heat; sf – semifinal; b – B final; † – en route to final mark; so – swim-off

== See also ==
- List of IPC world records in swimming – Men's long course
- List of IPC world records in swimming – Women's long course
- List of IPC world records in swimming – Women's short course
