= Swimming at the 2004 Summer Paralympics – Men's 400 metre freestyle S13 =

Men's 400m Freestyle S13 at the XII Paralympic Games
- Paralympic Swimming
- Venue: Olympic Aquatic Centre
- Dates: 20 September 2004
- Competitors: 10 from 7 nations
- Winning time: 4:28.84

Medalists
1st place, gold medalist(s)		Walter Wu	Canada
2nd place, silver medalist(s)		Scott Field	South Africa
3rd place, bronze medalist(s)		Brian Hill	Canada

The Men's 400 metre freestyle S13 swimming event at the 2004 Summer Paralympics was competed on 20 September. It was won by Walter Wu, representing Canada.

== 1st round ==
Qualified for final round

Heat 1

20 Sept. 2004, morning session

Rank	Athlete	Time	Notes
1	Scott Field (RSA)	4:44.98	
2	Brian Hill (CAN)	4:46.74	
3	Daniel Clausner (GER)	4:47.00	
4	Charl Bouwer (RSA)	4:47.31	
5	Sutat Sawattarn (THA)	5:16.15	

Heat 2

20 Sept. 2004, morning session

Rank	Athlete	Time	Notes
1	Robert Doerries (GER)	4:44.43	
2	Daniel Sharp (NZL)	4:45.35	
3	Walter Wu (CAN)	4:47.79	
4	Luis Arevalo (ESP)	4:52.47	
5	David Rangel (VEN)	5:01.14	

== Final round ==
20 Sept. 2004, evening session

Rank	Athlete	Time	Notes
1st place, gold medalist(s)	Walter Wu (CAN)	4:28.84	
2nd place, silver medalist(s)	Scott Field (RSA)	4:30.19	
3rd place, bronze medalist(s)	Brian Hill (CAN)	4:39.52	
4	Robert Doerries (GER)	4:41.92	
5	Daniel Clausner (GER)	4:42.37	
6	Daniel Sharp (NZL)	4:47.00	
7	Luis Arevalo (ESP)	4:47.40	
8	Charl Bouwer (RSA)	4:49.39	
