= Swimming at the 2004 Summer Paralympics – Men's 100 metre breaststroke SB13 =

Men's 100m Breaststroke SB13 at the XII Paralympic Games
- Paralympic Swimming
- Venue: Olympic Aquatic Centre
- Dates: 25 September 2004
- Competitors: 11 from 11 nations
- Winning time: 1:12.09

Medalists
1st place, gold medalist(s)		Daniel Clausner	Germany
1st place, gold medalist(s)		Andrey Strokin	Russia
3rd place, bronze medalist(s)		Daniel Sharp	New Zealand

The Men's 100 metre breaststroke SB13 swimming event at the 2004 Summer Paralympics was competed on 25 September. The result was a tie between Daniel Clausner, representing Germany, and Andrey Strokin of Russia, and two gold medals were awarded.

== 1st round ==
Qualified for next round

Heat 1

25 Sept. 2004, morning session

Rank	Athlete	Time	Notes
1	Andrea Palantrani (ITA)	1:14.33	
2	Andrey Strokin (RUS)	1:17.65	
3	Martin Stepanek (CZE)	1:18.19	
4	Daniel Clausner (GER)	1:18.26	
5	Tyler Emmett (CAN)	1:18.54	

Heat 2

25 Sept. 2004, morning session

Rank	Athlete	Time	Notes
1	Daniel Sharp (NZL)	1:15.65	
2	Oleg Rabyshkov (UKR)	1:15.98	
3	Shusaku Sugiuchi (JPN)	1:16.23	
4	Dervis Konuralp (GBR)	1:18.33	
5	Luis Arevalo (ESP)	1:18.96	
6	Kristo Ringas (EST)	1:24.15	

== Final round ==
25 Sept. 2004, evening session

Rank	Athlete	Time	Notes
1st place, gold medalist(s)	Daniel Clausner (GER)	1:12.09	
1st place, gold medalist(s)	Andrey Strokin (RUS)	1:12.09	
3rd place, bronze medalist(s)	Daniel Sharp (NZL)	1:12.93	
4	Shusaku Sugiuchi (JPN)	1:14.48	
5	Andrea Palantrani (ITA)	1:14.60	
6	Oleg Rabyshkov (UKR)	1:15.45	
7	Dervis Konuralp (GBR)	1:18.09	
	Martin Stepanek (CZE)	DSQ	
