= Swimming at the 2004 Summer Paralympics – Men's 200 metre individual medley SM13 =

Men's 200m Individual Medley SM13 at the XII Paralympic Games
- Paralympic Swimming
- Venue: Olympic Aquatic Centre
- Dates: 24 September 2004
- Competitors: 11 from 8 nations
- Winning time: 2:24.40

Medalists
1st place, gold medalist(s)		Daniel Clausner	Germany
2nd place, silver medalist(s)		Walter Wu	Canada
3rd place, bronze medalist(s)		Dervis Konuralp	Great Britain

The Men's 200 metre individual medley SM13 swimming event at the 2004 Summer Paralympics was competed on 24 September. It was won by Daniel Clausner, representing Germany.

== 1st round ==
Qualified for final round

Heat 1

24 Sept. 2004, morning session

Rank	Athlete	Time	Notes
1	Brian Hill (CAN)	2:30.81	
2	Daniel Clausner (GER)	2:31.10	
3	Tyler Emmett (CAN)	2:32.67	
4	Luis Arevalo (ESP)	2:33.97	
5	Martin Stepanek (CZE)	2:36.81	

Heat 2

24 Sept. 2004, morning session

Rank	Athlete	Time	Notes
1	Walter Wu (CAN)	2:28.46	
2	Dervis Konuralp (GBR)	2:29.95	
3	Anton Ganzha (UKR)	2:37.54	
4	Andrea Palantrani (ITA)	2:40.37	
5	Charl Bouwer (RSA)	2:43.46	
6	Oleg Rabyshkov (UKR)	2:50.32	

== Final round ==
24 Sept. 2004, evening session

Rank	Athlete	Time	Notes
1st place, gold medalist(s)	Daniel Clausner (GER)	2:24.40	
2nd place, silver medalist(s)	Walter Wu (CAN)	2:25.81	
3rd place, bronze medalist(s)	Dervis Konuralp (GBR)	2:26.59	
4	Tyler Emmett (CAN)	2:29.20	
5	Brian Hill (CAN)	2:31.07	
6	Luis Arevalo (ESP)	2:34.07	
7	Martin Stepanek (CZE)	2:35.22	
8	Anton Ganzha (UKR)	2:37.74	
