= Swimming at the 2008 Summer Paralympics – Men's 100 metre breaststroke SB13 =

Men's 100m Breaststroke SB13 at the XIII Paralympic Games
- Venue: Beijing National Aquatics Center
- Dates: 13 September
- Competitors: 13 from 10 nations
- Winning time: 1:04.63

Medalists
1st place, gold medalist(s)		Oleksii Fedyna	Ukraine
2nd place, silver medalist(s)		Daniel Sharp	New Zealand
3rd place, bronze medalist(s)		Uladzimir Izotau	Belarus

The men's 100m breaststroke SB13 event at the 2008 Summer Paralympics took place at the Beijing National Aquatics Center on 13 September. There were two heats; the swimmers with the eight fastest times advanced to the final.

== Results ==
=== Heats ===
Competed from 10:05.

==== Heat 1 ====
Rank	Name	Nationality	Time	Notes
1	Maksym Zavodnyy	Ukraine	1:09.53	Q
2	Daniel Clausner	Germany	1:10.68	Q
3	Daniel Sharp	New Zealand	1:10.81	Q
4	Oleg Tkalienko	Ukraine	1:13.91	
5	Dervis Konuralp	Great Britain	1:14.55	
6	Kristo Ringas	Estonia	1:15.39	

==== Heat 2 ====
Rank	Name	Nationality	Time	Notes
1	Oleksii Fedyna	Ukraine	1:09.59	Q
2	Uladzimir Izotau	Belarus	1:10.91	Q
3	Dave Ellis	Great Britain	1:10.92	Q
4	Mikhail Zimin	Russia	1:11.78	Q
5	Andrea Palantrani	Italy	1:13.33	Q
6	Michel Tielbeke	Netherlands	1:14.48	
7	Luis Antonio Arevalo	Spain	1:19.84	

=== Final ===
Competed at 18:55.

Rank	Name	Nationality	Time	Notes
1st place, gold medalist(s)	Oleksii Fedyna	Ukraine	1:04.63	WR
2nd place, silver medalist(s)	Daniel Sharp	New Zealand	1:08.73	
3rd place, bronze medalist(s)	Uladzimir Izotau	Belarus	1:08.90	
4	Mikhail Zimin	Russia	1:09.14	
5	Maksym Zavodnyy	Ukraine	1:09.22	
6	Daniel Clausner	Germany	1:09.49	
7	Dave Ellis	Great Britain	1:09.81	
8	Andrea Palantrani	Italy	1:12.82	

Q = qualified for final. WR = World Record.
