= Swimming at the 2004 Summer Paralympics – Men's 100 metre butterfly S13 =

Men's 100m Butterfly S13 at the XII Paralympic Games
- Paralympic Swimming
- Venue: Olympic Aquatic Centre
- Dates: 19 September 2004
- Competitors: 12 from 10 nations
- Winning time: 1:01.50

Medalists
1st place, gold medalist(s)		Charalampos Taiganidis	Greece
2nd place, silver medalist(s)		Scott Field	South Africa
3rd place, bronze medalist(s)		Andrey Strokin	Russia

The Men's 100 metre butterfly S13 swimming event at the 2004 Summer Paralympics was competed on 19 September. It was won by Charalampos Taiganidis, representing Greece.

== 1st round ==
Qualified for final round

Heat 1

19 Sept. 2004, morning session

Rank	Athlete	Time	Notes
1	Charalampos Taiganidis (GRE)	1:01.36	
2	Walter Wu (CAN)	1:03.62	
3	Somchai Nakprom (THA)	1:07.47	
4	David Rangel (VEN)	1:09.46	
5	Dmytro Korneyev (UKR)	1:12.60	
6	Andrea Palantrani (ITA)	1:12.70	

Heat 2

19 Sept. 2004, morning session

Rank	Athlete	Time	Notes
1	Scott Field (RSA)	1:01.65	
2	Andrey Strokin (RUS)	1:03.97	
3	Dervis Konuralp (GBR)	1:04.46	
4	Brian Hill (CAN)	1:04.93	
5	Shusaku Sugiuchi (JPN)	1:08.61	
6	Oleg Rabyshkov (UKR)	1:14.84	

== Final round ==
19 Sept. 2004, evening session

Rank	Athlete	Time	Notes
1st place, gold medalist(s)	Charalampos Taiganidis (GRE)	1:01.50	
2nd place, silver medalist(s)	Scott Field (RSA)	1:01.75	
3rd place, bronze medalist(s)	Andrey Strokin (RUS)	1:02.82	
4	Brian Hill (CAN)	1:03.90	
4	Walter Wu (CAN)	1:03.90	
6	Dervis Konuralp (GBR)	1:04.34	
7	Somchai Nakprom (THA)	1:07.46	
8	Shusaku Sugiuchi (JPN)	1:07.97	
