= Swimming at the 2004 Summer Paralympics – Men's 4 × 100 metre medley relay 49pts =

Men's 4x100m Medley 49 pts at the XII Paralympic Games
- Paralympic Swimming
- Venue: Olympic Aquatic Centre
- Dates: 27 September 2004
- Competitors: 5
- Winning time: 4:13.65

Medalists
1st place, gold medalist(s)		Oleksandr Mashchenko; Sergiy Demchuk; Sergiy Klippert; Dmytro Aleksyeyev	Ukraine
2nd place, silver medalist(s)		Enrique Floriano; Israel Oliver; Daniel Llambrich; Albert Gelis	Spain
3rd place, bronze medalist(s)		Sergei Punko; Dmitri Kravtsevich; Raman Makarau; Yury Rudzenok	Belarus

The Men's 4 x 100 metre medley relay 49pts swimming event at the 2004 Summer Paralympics was competed on 27 September. It was won by the team representing Ukraine.

== Final round ==
27 Sept. 2004, evening session

Rank	Team	Time	Notes
1st place, gold medalist(s)	Ukraine	4:13.65	WR
2nd place, silver medalist(s)	Spain	4:20.85	
3rd place, bronze medalist(s)	Belarus	4:21.51	
4	Japan	4:23.66	
5	Thailand	4:47.31	

== Team Lists ==
Ukraine; Oleksandr Mashchenko; Sergiy Demchuk; Sergiy Klippert; Dmytro Aleksyeyev	Spain; Enrique Floriano; Israel Oliver; Daniel Llambrich; Albert Gelis	Belarus; Sergei Punko; Dmitri Kravtsevich; Raman Makarau; Yury Rudzenok	Japan; Yoshikazu Sakai; Kosei Egawa; Shusaku Sugiuchi; Junichi Kawai
Thailand; Kitipong Sribunrueng; Sutat Sawattarn; Somchai Nakprom; Arpiwat Aranghiran
