= Begoña Curero Sastre =

Spanish Paralympic swimmer

Personal information
- Nationality: Spanish
- Born: 1990 (age 35–36) Santa Coloma de Gramenet, Catalonia, Spain

Sport
- Country: Spain
- Sport: Swimming
Medal record
IPC World Championships 25m
Silver medal – second place	2009 Rio de Janeiro	50 m freestyle S13
Silver medal – second place	2009 Rio de Janeiro	100 m breaststroke S13
Bronze medal – third place	2009 Rio de Janeiro	100 m ind. medley SM13
Bronze medal – third place	2009 Rio de Janeiro	200 m ind. medley SM13
IPC European Championships
Bronze medal – third place	2009 Reykjavik	100 m freestyle S13

Begoña Curero Sastre (born 1990) is a visually impaired Spanish swimmer from Catalonia. After failing to qualify for the 2008 Summer Paralympics, she qualified for and competed in the 2012 Summer Paralympics.

== Personal ==
Curero was born in 1990 in Santa Coloma de Gramenet. She has had a visual disability since birth, congenital glaucoma. By the time she was eleven years old, she had lost 68% of her vision.

Curero is from the Catalan region of Spain, and has lived in Asturias region of Spain. Her mother is from Calzada de Tera and Curero tries to return there often. Her parents met in La Unión de Campos.

Curero got involved in sports through ONCE. She did not have an examples from her family to look up to as none were particularly sporty. She found sports an opportunity where she did not feel like a person with a disability.

== Swimming ==
Curero took up swimming when she was eleven years old. Curero has belonged to the Associació Natació Gramenet when she was 16 years old and later joined Club Handisport de Oviedo. She has been affiliated with the High Performance Center in San Cugat Valles.

In 2005 in the United States, Curero made the podium at the World Junior Championships. In 2007, she competed at the IDM German Open, finishing sixth in the 200 meter freestyle and fifth in the 100 meter breaststroke. She tried but failed to qualify for the 2008 Summer Paralympics in swimming.

Curero competed at the 2009 Spanish national winter championships, where she set a Spanish national record in the 50 meter freestyle S13 event. At the 2009 World Short Course Swimming Championships in Brazil, she won a bronze medal. In Berlin, she medaled at the 2011 IDM German Open, winning a gold in the 100 meter breaststroke with a time of 1:25.35. In one edition of the event, she was one of twelve visually impaired Spanish swimmers competing at the event. In 2011, she had 9 total training sessions, with training occurring six of the seven days of the week. In 2011, she competed at the Spanish national adaptive swimming championships. In May 2012, she trained in Palma de Mallorca, in the Balearic Islands. In June 2012, she participated in the Castilla and León Adapted Swimming Open, which served as a Paralympic qualifying event. While she set a Spanish record in one event, she did not manage to set a Paralympic qualifying time in it. From the Catalan region of Spain, she was a recipient of a 2012 Plan ADO scholarship. She competed at the 2012 Summer Paralympics in the women's 200 meter individual medley SM5 event. She was one of twelve vision impaired Spanish swimmers competing at the Games. Prior to heading to London, she participated in a national vision impaired swim team training camp at the High Performance Centre of Sant Cugat from 6 to 23 August. Daily at the camp, there were two in water training sessions and one out of water training session.

In December 2013, the Spanish national adaptive swimming championships were held in Spain. Curero finished second in the S12 100 meter freestyle race.
