= Swimming at the 2004 Summer Paralympics – Men's 100 metre backstroke S13 =

Men's 100m Backstroke S13 at the XII Paralympic Games
- Paralympic Swimming
- Venue: Olympic Aquatic Centre
- Dates: 26 September 2004
- Competitors: 10 from 7 nations
- Winning time: 1:03.98

Medalists
1st place, gold medalist(s)		Charalampos Taiganidis	Greece
2nd place, silver medalist(s)		Walter Wu	Canada
3rd place, bronze medalist(s)		Brian Hill	Canada

The Men's 100 metre backstroke S13 swimming event at the 2004 Summer Paralympics was competed on 26 September. It was won by Charalampos Taiganidis, representing Greece.

== 1st round ==
Qualified for next round

Heat 1

26 Sept. 2004, morning session

Rank	Athlete	Time	Notes
1	Brian Hill (CAN)	1:07.10	
2	Daniel Clausner (GER)	1:09.24	
3	Robert Doerries (GER)	1:12.73	
4	Charl Bouwer (RSA)	1:12.77	
5	Somchai Nakprom (THA)	1:21.14	

Heat 2

26 Sept. 2004, morning session

Rank	Athlete	Time	Notes
1	Charalampos Taiganidis (GRE)	1:03.43	WR
2	Anton Ganzha (UKR)	1:09.05	
3	Walter Wu (CAN)	1:09.46	
4	Martin Stepanek (CZE)	1:13.67	
5	Sutat Sawattarn (THA)	1:17.07	

== Final round ==
26 Sept. 2004, evening session

Rank	Athlete	Time	Notes
1st place, gold medalist(s)	Charalampos Taiganidis (GRE)	1:03.98	
2nd place, silver medalist(s)	Walter Wu (CAN)	1:06.57	
3rd place, bronze medalist(s)	Brian Hill (CAN)	1:06.97	
4	Daniel Clausner (GER)	1:08.28	
5	Anton Ganzha (UKR)	1:08.35	
6	Robert Doerries (GER)	1:11.44	
7	Charl Bouwer (RSA)	1:12.11	
8	Martin Stepanek (CZE)	1:12.66	
