= Rudy Garcia-Tolson =

American Paralympic athlete

Personal information
- Nationality: American
- Born: September 14, 1988 (age 37) Riverside, California, U.S.

Sport
- Sport: Swimming, Athletics, Triathlon, Canoeing
- Events: 100m Breaststroke; 200m Individual Medley
Medal record
Men's swimming
Representing United States
Paralympic Games
Gold medal – first place	2004 Athens	200m Individual Medley SM7
Gold medal – first place	2008 Beijing	200m Individual Medley SM7
Silver medal – second place	2012 London	200m Individual Medley SM7
Silver medal – second place	2016 Rio De Janeiro	200m Individual Medley SM7
Bronze medal – third place	2008 Beijing	100m Breaststroke SB7
IPC Swimming World Championships
Gold medal – first place	2006 Durban	200m Individual Medley SM7
Gold medal – first place	2010 Eindhoven	200m Individual Medley SM7
Bronze medal – third place	2009 Rio – SC	200m Individual Medley SM7
Bronze medal – third place	2009 Rio – SC	4×50 m Freestyle Relay 20 pts
Bronze medal – third place	2010 Eindhoven	100m Breaststroke SB7
Men's athletics
Parapan American Games
Silver medal – second place	2011 Guadalajara	100m T42

Rudy Garcia-Tolson (born September 14, 1988) is a Paralympic swimmer, runner, triathlete and canoeist from the United States.

He was born with popliteal pterygium syndrome, resulting in a club foot, webbed fingers on both hands, a cleft lip and palate and the inability to straighten his legs. As a 5 year old wheelchair user, after 15 operations, he decided he would rather be a double amputee and walk with prosthetics. He had both legs removed above the knee.

== Swimming ==
Garcia-Tolson started swimming at age 6. Within a year, the seven-year old was competing against children without disabilities and breaking records.

When he was eight years old, he stated that he would swim in the 2004 Paralympic Games. He was true to his word and won the gold medal in the 200 meter individual medley and broke the world record for his SM7 class.

In the 2008 Beijing Paralympics, when he was 20, he again won the gold medal in the 200 meter individual medley event, breaking his own SM7 world record twice in the process. He also won the bronze medal in 100m breaststroke SB7.

At the 2012 Paralympics in London, he broke the SM7 world record in the 200 meter individual medley heat. In the final, both he and Yevheniy Bohodayko swam faster still. Bohodayko touched the wall first; Garcia-Tolson won silver. He is targeting the 2021 Paralympics in Tokyo.

On April 14, 2022, he was named to the roster to represent the United States at the 2022 World Para Swimming Championships.

== Other sports ==
=== Athletics ===
Garcia-Tolson started running at age 7. By the age of 13, he held T42 American Records in all distances from 400 metres to the half marathon.

At the 2011 Parapan American Games, he won a silver medal in the T42 100 metre event. At the 2012 Summer Paralympics, he competed on the track as well as in the pool. He ran personal best times in his T42 100 metre and 200 metre events, but did not qualify for finals.

=== Triathlon ===
Garcia-Tolson competed in first his triathlon at age 8, as the swimmer in a winning relay team. He raced with celebrities including Robin Williams as part of Team Braveheart.

At age 10, he completed the first of many individual triathlons.

In 2006, he completed the Ford Ironman World Championship 70.3 in Clearwater, Florida. He attempted the 2009 Ironman World Championship in Kona but missed the bike cut by 8 minutes. Six weeks later, at Ironman Arizona, he became the first double above-knee amputee to complete a full Ironman Triathlon.

Paratriathlon has been included in the program for the 2016 Paralympics. Although he has previously described triathlon as "cross training for swimming", Garcia-Tolson has indicated some interest in competing.

Other Sports

Garcia-Tolson's other activities include karate, skateboarding, as well as kayaking and mountain biking.

== Recognition and awards ==
In 2003, Garcia-Tolson was named one of Teen People Magazine's "20 Teens Who Will Change the World". He was the subject of The Final Sprint's December 2006 "Success Story"; a monthly column that aims to highlight remarkable and factual accounts of runners who have overcome major obstacles and/or changed their lives via running. He has won several awards, including the Arete Courage in Sports Award and the Casey Martin Award from Nike. Following his success at Ironman Arizona, he was nominated for an ESPY Award in 2010.

== Personal life ==
Garcia-Tolson has been a spokesperson for the Challenged Athletes Foundation since 1999.

He is a student at Southwestern College, likes hip hop music and skateboarding, and has one brother and three sisters.
