= 2009 IPC Swimming World Championships 25 m =

The 2009 IPC Swimming World Championships 25 m were held from 29 November – 5 December in Rio de Janeiro, Brazil. It was the first ever world-level short course paralympic swimming competition organised by the International Paralympic Committee (IPC).

== Medal table ==
Rank	Nation	Gold	Silver	Bronze	Total
1	Russia (RUS)	25	11	7	43
2	Australia (AUS)	21	17	17	55
3	Brazil (BRA)	18	7	16	41
4	United States (USA)	17	19	9	45
5	Great Britain (GBR)	17	17	12	46
6	Spain (ESP)	8	25	19	52
7	New Zealand (NZL)	6	2	7	15
8	Canada (CAN)	4	4	2	10
9	Netherlands (NED)	3	3	7	13
10	Japan (JPN)	3	3	6	12
11	Germany (GER)	3	2	7	12
12	Sweden (SWE)	2	7	6	15
13	Poland (POL)	2	4	6	12
14	France (FRA)	2	4	5	11
15	Croatia (CRO)	2	2	2	6
16	Norway (NOR)	2	1	3	6
17	Hungary (HUN)	1	3	1	5
18	Denmark (DEN)	1	2	1	4
19	Chinese Taipei	0	1	0	1
Totals (19 entries)		137	134	133	404

== Medalists ==
=== Men's events ===
Event	Gold		Silver		Bronze	
50 m freestyle S3	Curtis Lovejoy; United States	55.77; WR (S2)	Gabriel Feiten; Brazil	58.41	Mikael Fredriksson; Sweden	1:00.12
50 m freestyle S4	Richard Oribe; Spain	38.26; WR	David Smétanine; France	38.48	Christoffer Lindhe; Sweden	41.08
50 m freestyle S5	Daniel Dias; Brazil	32.01; WR	Sebastian Rodriguez; Spain	33.06	Hayri Simsek; France	36.87
50 m freestyle S6	Daniel Vidal; Spain	30.10; WR	Anders Olsson; Sweden	30.17	Adriano Lima; Brazil	32.67
50 m freestyle S7	Matthew Walker; Great Britain	27.28; WR	Matt Levy; Australia	28.03	Wagner Pires Da Silva; Brazil	30.98
50 m freestyle S8	Peter Leek; Australia	26.36; WR	Maurice Deelen; Netherlands	26.65	Charles Rozoy; France	26.67
50 m freestyle S9	Matthew Cowdrey; Australia	24.45; WR	Tamás Sors; Hungary	25.18	Mauro Luis Brasil Da Silva; Brazil	26.11
50 m freestyle S10	André Brasil; Brazil	22.44; WR	Benoît Huot; Canada	23.78	David Levecq; Spain	23.95
50 m freestyle S11	Konstantin Tychkov; Russia	27.70; WR	Grzegorz Polkowski; Poland	27.91	Keiichi Kimura; Japan	27.96
50 m freestyle S12	Alexander Nevolin-Svetov; Russia	23.86; WR	Tucker Dupree; United States	24.00	Omar Font Jimenez; Spain	24.28
50 m freestyle S13	Daniel Simon; Germany	24.24; WR	Daniel Sharp; New Zealand	24.46	Carlos Farrenberg; Brazil	24.67
100 m freestyle S4	Richard Oribe; Spain	1:22.98; WR	David Smétanine; France	1:25.00	Christoffer Lindhe; Sweden	1:28.66
100 m freestyle S5	Daniel Dias; Brazil	1:08.17; WR	Sebastian Rodriguez; Spain	1:14.95	Hayri Simsek; France	1:22.60
100 m freestyle S6	Anders Olsson; Sweden	1:03.93; WR	Adriano Lima; Brazil	1:11.39	Jefferson Da Silva Amaro; Brazil	1:18.03
100 m freestyle S7	Matt Levy; Australia	1:00.37; WR	Matthew Walker; Great Britain	1:01.04	Michael Ardern; New Zealand	1:04.64
100 m freestyle S8	Peter Leek; Australia	57.21; WR	Maurice Deelen; Netherlands	57.69	Charles Rozoy; France	58.08
100 m freestyle S9	Matthew Cowdrey; Australia	53.75; WR	Tamás Sors; Hungary	55.82	Jesus Collado; Spain	56.25
100 m freestyle S10	André Brasil; Brazil	48.70; WR	Benoît Huot; Canada	51.73	Phelipe Rodrigues; Brazil	51.78
100 m freestyle S11	Keiichi Kimura; Japan	1:00.65; WR	Philip Scholz; United States	1:01.24	Grzegorz Polkowski; Poland	1:02.65
100 m freestyle S12	Alexander Nevolin-Svetov; Russia	51.99; WR	Sergey Punko; Russia	53.76	Tucker Dupree; United States	53.98
100 m freestyle S13	Carlos Farrenberg; Brazil	53.52; WR	Stepan Smagin; Russia	54.61	Brian Hill; Canada	54.66
200 m freestyle S4	Richard Oribe; Spain	2:59.37	David Smétanine; France	3:05.60	Christoffer Lindhe; Sweden	3:09.68
200 m freestyle S5	Daniel Dias; Brazil	2:29.85; WR	Cameron Leslie; New Zealand	3:02.22	Takayuki Suzuki; Japan	3:03.70
400 m freestyle S6	Anders Olsson; Sweden	4:42.64	Igor Plotnikov; Russia	5:33.81	Adriano Lima; Brazil	5:43.15
400 m freestyle S7	Matt Levy; Australia	4:51.54; WR	Alex Dionne; United States	5:06.45	Ronaldo Souza Santos; Brazil	5:15.90
400 m freestyle S8	Sam Hynd; Great Britain	4:20.18; WR	Peter Leek; Australia	4:27.24	Christoph Burkard; Germany	4:36.25
400 m freestyle S9	Brenden Hall; Australia	4:11.32; WR	Jesus Collado; Spain	4:11.38	Kristijan Vincetić; Croatia	4:15.59
400 m freestyle S10	André Brasil; Brazil	3:54.57; WR	Robert Welbourn; Great Britain	4:02.76	Joe Wise; United States	4:07.99
400 m freestyle S12	Sergey Punko; Russia	4:06.42; WR	Enrique Floriano Millan; Spain	4:11.81	Tucker Dupree; United States	4:20.27
400 m freestyle S13	Stepan Smagin; Russia	4:18.88	Carlos Farrenberg; Brazil	4:19.50	Daniel Holt; New Zealand	4:20.48
50 m backstroke S4	David Smétanine; France	47.19; WR	Arnost Petracek; Czech Republic	48.32	Mikael Fredriksson; Sweden	59.44
50 m backstroke S5	Daniel Dias; Brazil	35.06; WR	Ricardo Ten; Spain	41.83	Xavier Torres; Spain	45.98
100 m backstroke S6	Igor Plotnikov; Russia	1:14.52; WR	Mateusz Michalski; Poland	1:21.06	Jefferson Da Silva Amaro; Brazil	1:25.98
100 m backstroke S7	Mihovil Spanja; Croatia	1:11.14; WR	Daisuke Ejima; Japan	1:14.13	Michael Ardern; New Zealand	1:15.32
100 m backstroke S8	Konstantin Lisenkov; Russia	1:04.56; WR	Thomas Young; Great Britain	1:05.80	Peter Leek; Australia	1:06.75
100 m backstroke S9	Matthew Cowdrey; Australia	57.93; WR	Jesus Collado; Spain	1:01.57	David Hill; Great Britain	1:04.82
100 m backstroke S10	André Brasil; Brazil	57.29; WR	Kardo Ploomipuu; Estonia	58.05	Michael Anderson; Australia	58.69
100 m backstroke S12	Alexander Nevolin-Svetov; Russia	57.54; WR	Tucker Dupree; United States	1:00.73	Albert Gelis; Spain	1:02.31
100 m backstroke S13	Brian Hill; Canada	59.30; WR	Daniel Simon; Germany	1:04.37	Michel Tielbeke; Netherlands	1:07.44
50 m breaststroke SB3	Takayuki Suzuki; Japan	48.25; WR	Miguel Luque Avila; Spain	51.76	Xavier Torres; Spain	54.35
100 m breaststroke SB4	Daniel Dias; Brazil	1:31.49; WR	Ricardo Ten; Spain	1:31.66	Ivanildo Alves De Vasconcelos; Brazil	1:50.33
100 m breaststroke SB6	Christoph Burkard; Germany	1:22.44; WR	Mihovil Spanja; Croatia	1:23.73	Artem Zakharov; Russia	1:33.25
100 m breaststroke SB7	Blake Cochrane; Australia	1:17.91; WR	Sascha Kindred; Great Britain	1:22.48	Thomas Young; Great Britain	1:25.38
100 m breaststroke SB8	Krzysztof Paterka; Poland	1:10.52; WR	Alejandro Sánchez Palomero; Spain	1:10.80	Andreas Onea; Austria	1:12.91
100 m breaststroke SB9	Pavel Poltavtsev; Russia	1:03.59; WR	Matthew Cowdrey; Australia	1:07.22	Rick Pendleton; Australia	1:07.94
100 m breaststroke SB13	Daniel Sharp; New Zealand	1:06.34; WR	Sergey Punko; Russia	1:07.73	Edgar Quirós Baltanas; Spain	1:08.07
50 m butterfly S5	Daniel Dias; Brazil	34.02; WR	Ricardo Ten; Spain	40.06	Cameron Leslie; New Zealand	43.76
50 m butterfly S6	Sascha Kindred; Great Britain	31.38; WR	Daniel Vidal Fuster; Spain	31.94	Igor Plotnikov; Russia	35.31
50 m butterfly S7	Matt Levy; Australia	31.70; WR	Ruslan Sadvakasov; Russia	31.94	Matthew Walker; Great Britain	32.18
100 m butterfly S8	Charles Rozoy; France	1:00.56; WR	Peter Leek; Australia	1:00.79	Alejandro Sánchez Palomero; Spain	1:05.00
100 m butterfly S9	Tamás Sors; Hungary	58.30; WR	Matthew Cowdrey; Australia	59.46	Kristijan Vincetić; Croatia	59.90
100 m butterfly S10	André Brasil; Brazil	54.76; WR	David Levecq; Spain	56.61	Mike van der Zanden; Netherlands	57.69
100 m butterfly S11	Keiichi Kimura; Japan	1:07.02; WR	Philip Scholz; United States	1:08.62	André Luis Meneghetti; Brazil	1:12.73
100 m butterfly S12	Tucker Dupree; United States	58.29; WR	Sergey Punko; Russia	58.85	Albert Gelis; Spain	59.69
100 m butterfly S13	Brian Hill; Canada	57.04; WR	Daniel Simon; Germany	59.14	Michel Tielbeke; Netherlands	59.64
100 m individual medley SM5	Daniel Dias; Brazil	1:18.99	Ivanildo Vasconcelos; Brazil	1:43.59	Ariel Quassi; Argentina	1:46.32
100 m individual medley SM6	Sascha Kindred; Great Britain	1:14.67; WR	Anders Olsson; Sweden	1:21.40	Tadhg Slattery; South Africa	1:25.48
100 m individual medley SM7	Matt Levy; Australia	1:11.32; WR	Mihovil Spanja; Croatia	1:13.40	Matthew Walker; Great Britain	1:15.20
100 m individual medley SM8	Peter Leek; Australia	1:04.66; WR	Blake Cochrane; Australia	1:07.92	Sam Hynd; Great Britain	1:08.16
100 m individual medley SM9	Matthew Cowdrey; Australia	59.07; WR	Tamás Sors; Hungary	1:04.58	Takuro Yamada; Japan	1:05.71
100 m individual medley SM10	André Brasil; Brazil	57.68; WR	Benoît Huot; Canada	59.77	Lucas Ludwig; Germany	1:00.62
100 m individual medley SM12	Alexander Nevolin-Svetov; Russia	59.43; WR	Sergey Punko; Russia	1:00.67	Albert Gelis; Spain	1:02.63
100 m individual medley SM13	Michel Tielbeke; Netherlands	1:02.76	Kevin Mendez Martinez; Spain	1:03.84	Keiichi Kimura; Japan	1:09.38
150 m individual medley SM3	Genezi Andrade; Brazil	3:37.29	Mikael Fredriksson; Sweden	3:45.02	Michael Demarco; United States	4:10.48
150 m individual medley SM4	Cameron Leslie; New Zealand	2:34.60; WR	Takayuki Suzuki; Japan	2:39.69	Xavier Torres; Spain	2:39.73
200 m individual medley SM5	Daniel Dias; Brazil	2:45.94; WR	Pablo Cimadevila Álvarez; Spain	3:35.74	Ivanildo Alves De Vasconcelos; Brazil	3:38.70
200 m individual medley SM6	Sascha Kindred; Great Britain	2:41.24; WR	Anders Olsson; Sweden	2:54.73	Tadhg Slattery; South Africa	3:10.94
200 m individual medley SM7	Mihovil Spanja; Croatia	2:34.31; WR	Matt Levy; Australia	2:35.40	Rudy Garcia-Tolson; United States	2:44.68
200 m individual medley SM8	Peter Leek; Australia	2:20.38; WR	Sam Hynd; Great Britain	2:24.31	Alejandro Sánchez Palomero; Spain	2:26.32
200 m individual medley SM9	Matthew Cowdrey; Australia	2:11.83	Takuro Yamada; Japan	2:18.35	Tamás Sors; Hungary	2:19.59
200 m individual medley SM10	André Brasil; Brazil	2:04.05; WR	Benoît Huot; Canada	2:11.02	Rick Pendleton; Australia	2:13.14
200 m individual medley SM12	Sergey Punko; Russia	2:10.63; WR	Enrique Floriano; Spain	2:11.44	Alexander Nevolin-Svetov; Russia	2:15.76
200 m individual medley SM13	Michel Tielbeke; Netherlands	2:16.80	Kevin Mendez Martinez; Spain	2:19.39	Edgar Quirós Baltanas; Spain	2:25.19
4×50 m freestyle relay 20 pts	Spain; Richard Oribe; Ricardo Ten; Sebastian Rodriguez; Daniel Vidal	2:21.35; WR	Brazil; Jefferson Da Silva Amaro; Genezi Andrade; Adriano Lima; Daniel Dias	2:41.98	United States; Michael Demarco; Alex Dionne; Curtis Lovejoy; Rudy Garcia-Tolson	3:31.75
4×100 m freestyle relay 34 pts	Australia; Michael Anderson; Peter Leek; Matt Levy; Matthew Cowdrey	3:46.38; WR	Brazil; Mauro Luis Brasil Da Silva; Daniel Dias; Phelipe Rodrigues; André Brasil	3:48.63	Great Britain; Matt Walker; Samuel Hynd; David Hill; Graham Edmunds	3:54.23
4×100 m freestyle relay 49 pts	Russia; Alexander Pikalov; Stepan Smagin; Sergey Punko; Alexander Nevolin-Svetov	3:35.92	Spain; Albert Gelis; Kevin Mendez Martinez; Omar Font; Enrique Floriano Millan	3:46.67	Brazil; Rodrigo Machado De Sousa Robeiro; Renato Nunes Da Silva; André Luis Meneghetti; Carlos Farrenberg	4:21.01
4×50 m medley relay 20 pts	Spain; Xavier Torres; Ricardo Ten; Daniel Vidal; Sebastian Rodriguez	2:35.48; WR	Brazil; Daniel Dias; Moises Domingues Batista; Jefferson Da Silva Amaro; Adriano Lima	2:43.03	None	
4×100 m medley relay 34 pts	Australia; Matthew Cowdrey; Rick Pendleton; Peter Leek; Blake Cochrane	4:08.37; WR	Spain; Jesus Collado; Alejandro Sánchez Palomero; David Levecq; Daniel Vidal	4:21.17	Russia; Igor Plotnikov; Denis Dorogaev; Pavel Poltavtsev; Konstantin Lisenkov	4:21.26
4×100 m medley relay 49 pts	Russia; Alexander Nevolin-Svetov; Mikhail Zimin; Sergey Punko; Alexander Pikalov	4:00.99; WR	Spain; Albert Gelis; Edgar Quirós Baltanas; Enrique Floriano Millan; Omar Font	4:07.74	Brazil; Renato Nunes Da Silva; Rodrigo Machado De Sousa Ribeiro; André Luis Meneghetti; Carlos Farrenberg	4:54.53

Legend: WR – World record

=== Women's events ===
Event	Gold		Silver		Bronze	
50 m freestyle S4	Cheryl Angelelli; United States	52.26	Jennie Ekström; Sweden	52.84	Karolina Hamer; Poland	56.55
50 m freestyle S5	Běla Hlaváčková; Czech Republic	40.41	Lisette Teunissen; Netherlands	44.40	Karina Lauridsen; Denmark	46.39
50 m freestyle S6	Eleanor Simmonds; Great Britain	36.68; WR	Natalie Jones; Great Britain	37.69	Casey Johnson; United States	38.99
50 m freestyle S7	Mallory Weggemann; United States	32.17; WR	Cortney Jordan; United States	33.28	Kirsten Bruhn; Germany	33.39
50 m freestyle S8	Cecilie Drabsch Norland; Norway	31.74; WR	Jessica Long; United States	32.37	Jacqueline Freney; Australia	32.46
50 m freestyle S9	Irina Grazhdanova; Russia	28.82; WR	Louise Watkin; Great Britain	28.86	Annabelle Williams; Australia	28.87
50 m freestyle S10	Esther Morales Fernandez; Spain	28.38; WR	Susan Beth Scott; United States	29.44	Viera Mikulasikova; Slovakia	29.58
50 m freestyle S11	Chantal Cavin; Switzerland	32.35; WR	Olga Sokolova; Russia	33.37	Irina Larova; Russia	34.51
50 m freestyle S12	Oxana Savchenko; Russia	26.54; WR	Anna Efimenko; Russia	27.51	Joanna Mendak; Poland	28.58
50 m freestyle S13	Prudence Watt; Australia	28.38	Begoña Curero Sastre; Spain	29.07	Teigan Van Roosmalen; Australia	29.83
100 m freestyle S4	Cheryl Angelelli; United States	1:47.04	Jennie Ekström; Sweden	1:55.03	Karolina Hamer; Poland	1:58.45
100 m freestyle S5	Běla Hlaváčková; Czech Republic	1:27.84	Karina Lauridsen; Denmark	1:30.61	Lisette Teunissen; Netherlands	1:34.89
100 m freestyle S6	Eleanor Simmonds; Great Britain	1:17.61; WR	Natalie Jones; Great Britain	1:21.18	Erika Nara; Japan	1:21.85
100 m freestyle S7	Mallory Weggemann; United States	1:08.56; WR	Cortney Jordan; United States	1:10.63	Kirsten Bruhn; Germany	1:11.90
100 m freestyle S8	Jessica Long; United States	1:08.10; WR	Jacqueline Freney; Australia	1:08.98	Cecilie Drabsch Norland; Norway	1:11.45
100 m freestyle S9	Stephanie Millward; Great Britain	1:01.95; WR	Sarai Gascon Moreno; Spain	1:02.44	Louise Watkin; Great Britain	1:02.50
100 m freestyle S10	Susan Beth Scott; United States	1:02.48; WR	Esther Morales Fernandez; Spain	1:02.66	Sophie Pascoe; New Zealand	1:03.34
100 m freestyle S12	Oxana Savchenko; Russia	58.60; WR	Anna Efimenko; Russia	1:00.83	Naomi Maike Schnittger; Germany	1:02.94
100 m freestyle S13	Rhiannon Henry; Great Britain	1:00.02; WR	Prudence Watt; Australia	1:02.37	Teigan Van Roosmalen; Australia	1:04.85
200 m freestyle S5	Lisette Teunissen; Netherlands	3:21.34	Cheryl Angelelli; United States	3:47.10	Karolina Hamer; Poland	4:03.82
400 m freestyle S6	Eleanor Simmonds; Great Britain	5:32.45	Sarah Louise Rung; Norway	5:53.68	Erika Nara; Japan	6:32.36
400 m freestyle S7	Mallory Weggemann; United States	5:08.53; WR	Cortney Jordan; United States	5:13.69	Erin Popovich; United States	5:19.98
400 m freestyle S8	Jessica Long; United States	4:46.56; WR	Jacqueline Freney; Australia	5:02.93	Lisa den Braber; Netherlands	5:35.64
400 m freestyle S9	Stéphanie Dixon; Canada	4:38.84; WR	Stephanie Millward; Great Britain	4:39.18	Ellie Cole; Australia	4:42.48
400 m freestyle S10	Susan Beth Scott; United States	4:38.10; WR	Samantha Gandolfo; Australia	4:45.67	Sophie Pascoe; New Zealand	4:50.70
400 m freestyle S13	Anna Efimenko; Russia	4:41.28; WR	Amaya Alonso Alvarez; Spain	4:47.66	Naomi Maike Schnittger; Germany	4:53.11
50 m backstroke S4	Edênia Garcia; Brazil	55.48	Karolina Hamer; Poland	1:02.50	Jennie Ekstrom; Sweden	1:05.02
50 m backstroke S5	Běla Hlaváčková; Czech Republic	42.64; WR	Karina Lauridsen; Denmark	44.91	Lisette Teunissen; Netherlands	51.46
100 m backstroke S7	Kirsten Bruhn; Germany	1:21.72; WR	Cortney Jordan; United States	1:22.65	Katrina Porter; Australia	1:23.90
100 m backstroke S8	Mariann Vestbøstad; Norway	1:20.08	Jacqueline Freney; Australia	1:25.11	Anastasia Diodorova; Russia	1:28.73; WR (S6)
100 m backstroke S9	Stéphanie Dixon; Canada	1:07.83; WR	Stephanie Millward; Great Britain	1:09.66	Ellie Cole; Australia	1:10.05
100 m backstroke S10	Sophie Pascoe; New Zealand	1:07.87; WR	Shireen Sapiro; South Africa	1:08.87	Esther Morales Fernandez; Spain	1:11.82
100 m backstroke S13	Anna Efimenko; Russia	1:09.73	Karina Petrikovicova; Slovakia	1:12.62	Teigan Van Roosmalen; Australia	1:13.93
50 m breaststroke SB3	Karina Lauridsen; Denmark	59.30	Jennie Ekström; Sweden	1:20.20; WR (SB2)	None	
100 m breaststroke SB4	Běla Hlaváčková; Czech Republic	2:02.63	Alice Hsiao Hung Luo; Chinese Taipei	2:08.45	Ana Clara Carneiro Grillo Cruz; Brazil	2:12.47
100 m breaststroke SB6	Elizabeth Johnson; Great Britain	1:38.82; WR	Katrina Porter; Australia	1:53.40	Marianne Mæland; Norway	1:53.46
100 m breaststroke SB7	Jessica Long; United States	1:26.85; WR	Erin Popovich; United States	1:31.58	Kirsten Bruhn; Germany	1:35.30; WR (SB5)
100 m breaststroke SB8	Olesya Vladykina; Russia	1:15.54; WR	Claire Cashmore; Great Britain	1:19.96	Paulina Woźniak; Poland	1:21.69
100 m breaststroke SB9	Nina Ryabova; Russia	1:21.00; WR	Kate Grey; Great Britain	1:21.14	Sophie Pascoe; New Zealand	1:21.16
100 m breaststroke SB12	Karolina Pelendritou; Cyprus	1:14.38; WR	Carla Casals Sole; Spain	1:18.01	Oxana Savchenko; Russia	1:20.46
100 m breaststroke SB13	Prudence Watt; Australia	1:20.31	Begoña Curero Sastre; Spain	1:22.86	Marta Maria Gomez Battelli; Spain	1:26.62
50 m butterfly S6	Anastasia Diodorova; Russia	38.86; WR	Casey Johnson; United States	40.67	Natalie Jones; Great Britain	41.40
50 m butterfly S7	Mallory Weggemann; United States	35.17; WR	Erin Popovich; United States	36.62	Veronica Almeida; Brazil	38.47
100 m butterfly S9	Sarai Gascon Moreno; Spain	1:07.21; WR	Annabelle Williams; Australia	1:08.78	Stephanie Millward; Great Britain	1:09.24
100 m butterfly S10	Sophie Pascoe; New Zealand	1:08.94; WR	Shireen Saprio; South Africa	1:12.68	Samantha Gandolfo; Australia	1:15.64
100 m butterfly S8	Jessica Long; United States	1:12.24; WR	Jacqueline Freney; Australia	1:20.55	Chantal Cavin; Switzerland	1:36.76
100 m butterfly S13	Joanna Mendak; Poland	1:05.10; WR (S12)	Rhiannon Henry; Great Britain	1:06.12; WR (S13)	Prudence Watt; Australia	1:06.83
100 m individual medley SM6	Natalie Jones; Great Britain	1:30.85	Eleanor Simmonds; Great Britain	1:31.59	Elizabeth Johnson; Great Britain	1:32.69
100 m individual medley SM8	Olesya Vladykina; Russia	1:12.27	Jessica Long; United States	1:16.76	Lisa den Braber; Netherlands	1:28.33
100 m individual medley SM9	Claire Cashmore; Great Britain	1:11.83; WR	Stephanie Millward; Great Britain	1:12.61	Kate Grey; Great Britain	1:12.78
100 m individual medley SM10	Sophie Pascoe; New Zealand	1:10.04; WR	Maud Didier; France	1:15.83	Hannah MacDougall; Australia	1:17.31
100 m individual medley SM12	Oxana Savchenko; Russia	1:08.90	Karolina Pelendritou; Cyprus	1:09.77	Carla Casals Sole; Spain	1:11.43
100 m individual medley SM13	Prudence Watt; Australia	1:11.60; WR	Teigan Van Roosmalen; Australia	1:14.04	Begoña Curero Sastre; Spain	1:15.83
200 m individual medley SM6	Eleanor Simmonds; Great Britain	3:08.80; WR	Natalie Jones; Great Britain	3:09.88	Elizabeth Johnson; Great Britain	3:17.47
200 m individual medley SM7	Erin Popovich; United States	2:53.07; WR	Cortney Jordan; United States	3:06.92	Brianna Nelson; Canada	3:11.65
200 m individual medley SM8	Olesya Vladykina; Russia	2:35.83; WR	Jessica Long; United States	2:42.88	Mariann Vestbestad; Norway	3:06.84
200 m individual medley SM9	Stephanie Millward; Great Britain	2:33.18	Claire Cashmore; Great Britain	2:34.35	Ellie Cole; Australia	2:36.01
200 m individual medley SM10	Sophie Pascoe; New Zealand	2:32.27; WR	Viera Mikulasikova; Slovakia	2:40.86	Susan Beth Scott; United States	2:41.36
200 m individual medley SM12	Oxana Savchenko; Russia	2:29.61; WR	Joanna Mendak; Poland	2:31.52	Amaya Alonso Alvarez; Spain	2:34.78
200 m individual medley SM13	Prudence Watt; Australia	2:31.69	Teigan Van Roosmalen; Australia	2:36.11	Begoña Curero Sastre; Spain	2:49.94
4×50 m freestyle relay 20 pts	United States; Kayla Wheeler; Casey Johnson; Cheryl Angelelli; Mallory Weggemann	3:50.55	None		None	
4×100 m freestyle relay 34 pts	Great Britain; Stephanie Millward; Eleanor Simmonds; Lauren Steadman; Louise Watkin	4:26.20; WR	United States; Susan Beth Scott; Cortney Jordan; Jessica Long; Erin Popovich	4:35.61	Australia; Annabelle Williams; Jacqueline Freney; Katrina Porter; Ellie Cole	4:37.04
4×50 m medley relay 20 pts	United States; Cheryl Angelelli; Erin Popovich; Casey Johnson; Kayla Wheeler	4:06.71	None		None	
4×100 m medley relay 34 pts	Great Britain; Stephanie Millward; Claire Cashmore; Elizabeth Simpkin; Eleanor Simmonds	4:56.23; WR	Russia; Nina Ryabova; Olesya Vladykina; Irina Grazhdanova; Oxana Guseva	4:57.92	France; Rachel Lardière; Emilie Gral; Extitxu Vivanco; Maud Didier	5:22.52

Legend: WR – World record

== Participating nations ==
Competitors representing thirty-one National Paralympic Committees (NPCs) attended the championships.

- Argentina
- Australia
- Austria
- Belgium
- Brazil
- Canada
- Chinese Taipei
- Croatia
- Cyprus
- Czech Republic
- Denmark
- Estonia
- France
- Germany
- Great Britain
- Hungary
- Japan
- Montenegro
- Netherlands
- New Zealand
- Norway
- Poland
- Russia
- South Africa
- Slovakia
- Slovenia
- Spain
- Switzerland
- Sweden
- United States
- Uruguay

== See also ==
- 2009 in swimming
- Swimming at the 2008 Summer Paralympics
- 2010 IPC Swimming World Championships
- List of IPC world records in swimming
