= Swimming at the 2008 Summer Paralympics – Men's 100 metre backstroke S13 =

Men's 100m Backstroke S13 at the XIII Paralympic Games
- Venue: Beijing National Aquatics Center
- Dates: 14 September
- Competitors: 12 from 9 nations
- Winning time: 59.85

Medalists
| 1st place, gold medalist(s) | | Charalampos Taiganidis | Greece |
| 2nd place, silver medalist(s) | | Oleksii Fedyna | Ukraine |
| 3rd place, bronze medalist(s) | | Dmytro Aleksyeyev | Ukraine |

The men's 100m backstroke S13 event at the 2008 Summer Paralympics took place at the Beijing National Aquatics Center on 14 September. There were two heats; the swimmers with the eight fastest times advanced to the final.

== Results ==
=== Heats ===
Competed from 10:06.

==== Heat 1 ====
| Rank | Name | Nationality | Time | Notes |
|---|---|---|---|---|
| 1 | Dmytro Aleksyeyev | Ukraine | 1:03.67 | Q |
| 2 | Charl Bouwer | South Africa | 1:03.76 | Q |
| 3 | Brian Hill | Canada | 1:05.65 | Q |
| 4 | Devin Gotell | Canada | 1:07.46 | Q |
| 5 | Antti Latikka | Finland | 1:08.43 | Q |
| 6 | Martin Stepanek | Czech Republic | 1:09.62 | |

==== Heat 2 ====
| Rank | Name | Nationality | Time | Notes |
|---|---|---|---|---|
| 1 | Charalampos Taiganidis | Greece | 1:03.02 | Q, PR |
| 2 | Oleksii Fedyna | Ukraine | 1:05.05 | Q |
| 3 | Daniel Clausner | Germany | 1:06.82 | Q |
| 4 | Kevin Mendez | Spain | 1:11.38 | |
| 5 | Dave Ellis | Great Britain | 1:11.41 | |
| | Daniel Simon | Germany | | DNS |

=== Final ===
Competed at 18:41.

| Rank | Name | Nationality | Time | Notes |
|---|---|---|---|---|
| 1st place, gold medalist(s) | Charalampos Taiganidis | Greece | 59.85 | WR |
| 2nd place, silver medalist(s) | Oleksii Fedyna | Ukraine | 1:02.93 | |
| 3rd place, bronze medalist(s) | Dmytro Aleksyeyev | Ukraine | 1:03.40 | |
| 4 | Charl Bouwer | South Africa | 1:03.86 | |
| 5 | Brian Hill | Canada | 1:05.52 | |
| 6 | Daniel Clausner | Germany | 1:06.76 | |
| 7 | Antti Latikka | Finland | 1:08.07 | |
| 8 | Devin Gotell | Canada | 1:08.17 | |

Q = qualified for final. WR = World Record. PR = Paralympic Record. DNS = Did not start.
