= Sugiuchi =

Sugiuchi (written: 杉内) is a Japanese surname. Notable people with the surname include:

- Masao Sugiuchi (杉内 雅男; 1920–2017), Japanese Go player
- Shusaku Sugiuchi (杉内 周作), Japanese Paralympic swimmer
- Toshiya Sugiuchi (杉内 俊哉; born 1980), Japanese baseball player
