= Andrey Strokin =

Russian Paralympic swimmer

Medal record

Swimming

Representing Russia

Paralympic Games
Gold medal – first place	2000 Sydney	4 x 50 metre medley relay 20pts - S13
Gold medal – first place	2004 Athens	100 metre freestyle - S13
Gold medal – first place	2004 Athens	4 x 50 metre medley relay 20pts - S13
Gold medal – first place	2004 Athens	100 metre freestyle - S13
Gold medal – first place	2004 Athens	100 metre breaststroke - SB13
Bronze medal – third place	2004 Athens	100 metre butterfly - S13
Bronze medal – third place	2008 Beijing	4 x 50 metre medley relay 20pts - S13
Bronze medal – third place	2008 Beijing	100 metre butterfly - S13

Andrey Strokin is a paralympic swimmer from Russia who has competed mainly in category S13 events.

== Career ==
Andrey has competed in three Paralympics in 2000, 2004 and 2008 winning multiple medals each time. In 2000 he finished in fourth in the 400 metres (1,300 ft) freestyle and set a games record in winning the 100 metres (330 ft) freestyle and a world record in winning the 50 metres (160 ft) freestyle. In the 2004 games he finished third in the 100m butterfly, won the 100m breaststroke in a dead heat and sop sharing the medal with Germany's Daniel Clausner, he also retained the gold in the 50m freestyle and 100m freestyle where he broke the games record. At the 2008 games he finished seventh in the 100m freestyle and won bronze in both the 100m butterfly and 50m freestyle where he swam quicker than the games record had been before the heats.
