= Brian Hill (swimmer) =

Canadian Paralympic swimmer (born 1982)

Personal information
- Full name: Brian David Hill
- Born: 29 December 1982 (age 43) Duncan, British Columbia, Canada
- Height: 1.84 m (6 ft 0 in)
- Weight: 88 kg (194 lb)

Sport
- Sport: Swimming
- Strokes: freestyle, backstroke, butterfly, medley
- Club: Duncan Stingrays Swim Club
Medal record
Paralympic Games
| Silver medal – second place | 2000 Sydney | 100 m butterfly S13 |
| Bronze medal – third place | 2004 Athens | 400 m freestyle S13 |
| Bronze medal – third place | 2004 Athens | 100 m backstroke S13 |
IPC World Championships (SC)
| Gold medal – first place | 2009 Rio | 100 m backstroke |
| Gold medal – first place | 2009 Rio | 100 m butterfly |
| Bronze medal – third place | 2009 Rio | 100 m freestyle |
Parapan American Games
| Gold medal – first place | 2007 Rio | 100 m backstroke |
| Gold medal – first place | 2007 Rio | 100 m butterfly |
| Gold medal – first place | 2007 Rio | 200 m medley |
| Silver medal – second place | 2007 Rio | 50 m freestyle |
| Silver medal – second place | 2007 Rio | 100 m freestyle |
- Updated on 23 September 2014

Brian David Hill (born 29 December 1982) is a Canadian S13 para-swimmer who competed in the 2000, 2004, 2008, 2012 Summer Paralympics and the 2007 Parapan American Games. He has won five gold medals, three silver medals and three bronze medals in his international career. He has won the British Columbia Blind Sports Award and Athlete of the Year Award.

== Personal life ==
Hill was born on 29 December 1982 in Duncan, British Columbia, with a genetic retinal disorder which results in only ten percent vision. Since the 2004 Summer Paralympics, he has resided in Montreal, Quebec. During his childhood, Hill's parents dug a 17-metre pool for him to swim in. "It was the first sport where I was able to train and compete with other kids at an equal level," he says. He started competitive swimming at the age of nine.

== Career ==
At the age of 17, Hill participated in six events at the 2000 Summer Paralympics in Sydney, Australia. He won silver in the men's 100 metre butterfly in 1:02.79, finished fourth in the 100 metre backstroke in 1:10.39, sixth in the 50 metre freestyle in 27.11, eighth in the 100 metre freestyle in 59.23, eighth in the 400 metre freestyle in 4:54.96 and tenth in the 200 metre individual medley in 2:35.39. Looking back in 2008 on his results, Brian said, "Sydney Games were special because it was my first Paralympic Games and everything. The atmosphere, crowds and facilities were amazing."

At the 2004 Summer Paralympics, Hill won bronze in the 100 metre backstroke in 1:06.97, bronze in the 400 metre freestyle in 4:39.52, finished equal fourth in the 100 metre butterfly in 1:03.90, fifth in the 100 metre freestyle in 59.32, fifth in the 200 metre individual medley in 2:31.07 and 14th in the 50 metre freestyle in 28.09. About the 2004 Paralympics in Greece, Brian said in 2008 that he "was really able to feel the history of the Olympics".

At the 2006 Commonwealth Games in Melbourne, Hill finished ninth in the 50 metre EAD freestyle in 26.68 and ninth in the 100 metre EAD freestyle in 59.58.

Hill won five medals at the 2007 Parapan American Games including three golds and two silvers. He won gold in 100 metre butterfly where he got a time of 1:00.52. He had tied the world record time with Canadian para-swimmer Walter Wu. He had also won another two golds and two silvers. He says "I'm pretty happy with the result overall. Technically it was very good."

Before going to Beijing for his third Paralympic Games, Hill's preparation involved swimming about 120 kilometres in two weeks. Hill said, "I completed about eight to nine workouts a week and spent around 18 to 20 hours per week in the pool,".

At the 2008 Summer Paralympics, Hill finished fifth in the 100 metre backstroke in 1:05.52, 12th in the 100 metre butterfly in 1:03.25, 15th in the 100 metre freestyle in 59.80 and 17th in the 50 metre freestyle in 26.84.

At the 2009 IPC Swimming World Championships 25 m in Rio, Hill won gold in the 100 metre backstroke in a new record time of 59.30, gold in the 100 metre butterfly in a new record time of 57.04 and bronze in the 100 metre freestyle in 54.66. At the 2010 IPC Swimming World Championships, Hill finished fifth in the 100 metre backstroke in 1:04.65.

At the 2012 Summer Paralympics, Hill finished seventh in the 100 metre backstroke in 1:04.97 and equal eighth in the heats 100 metre butterfly with Australia's Sean Russo in 1:01.61. In the swim-off, Russo defeated Hill with each posting times of 1:01.24 and 1:02.72 respectively.

== Achievements ==
In 2002, Hill won the Sport British Columbia Athlete of the Year award in the athletes with a disability category. He won again in the next year. In 2003, Hill was awarded the Blind Sports award from the British Columbia Blind Sports and Recreation Association (BCBSRA).
