= Marianne Fredbo =

Norwegian Paralympic swimmer

Personal information
- Born: 10 October 1986 (age 39) Kristiansand, Norway

Sport
- Country: Norway
- Sport: Paralympic swimming
- Disability class: S7, SB6
- Events: Breaststroke; Butterfly stroke
Medal record
Paralympic swimming
Representing Norway
World Championships (SC)
Bronze medal – third place	2009 Rio de Janeiro	Women's 100m breaststroke SB6

Marianne Fredbo (née Mæland; born 10 October 1986) is a former Norwegian Paralympic swimmer who competed in international level events. Her highest achievement is winning a bronze medal at the 2009 IPC Swimming World Championships in the 100 m breaststroke SB6. She has represented Norway at the 2008 and 2012 Summer Paralympics but did not medal. Fredbo's right arm and left leg were amputated in a lawnmower accident when she was four years old.
