= Serhiy Demchuk =

Ukrainian Paralympic swimmer

Medal record

Men's swimming

Representing Ukraine

Paralympic Games
Gold medal – first place	2004 Athens	4x100 m freestyle 49 pts
Gold medal – first place	2004 Athens	4x100 m medley 49 pts

Sergiy Demchuk (Ukrainian: Сергій Демчук) is a paralympic swimmer from Ukraine competing mainly in category S12 events.

Sergiy was part of the Ukrainian Paralympic swimming team that travelled to both the 2004 and 2008 Summer Paralympics. In 2004 he was part of the Ukrainian squad that broke the world record and won gold in both the 4 × 100 m freestyle and the 4 × 100 m medley. He was not as successful in individual events, he failed to make the final of the 50m and 100m freestyle and finished seventh in the 100m butterfly. He did not compete in the relays in 2008 but competed in the same individual events and again he missed out on the finals in the 50m and 100m freestyle events and finished sixth in the 100m butterfly.
