= Scott Field (swimmer) =

South African Paralympic swimmer

Medal record

Men's swimming

Representing South Africa

Paralympic Games
Silver medal – second place	2000 Sydney	50 m freestyle S13
Silver medal – second place	2000 Sydney	100 m freestyle S13
Silver medal – second place	2004 Athens	100 m freestyle S13
Silver medal – second place	2004 Athens	100 m butterfly S13
Silver medal – second place	2004 Athens	400 m freestyle S13
Bronze medal – third place	2000 Sydney	100 m butterfly S13
Bronze medal – third place	2004 Athens	50 m freestyle S13

Commonwealth Games
Silver medal – second place	2002 Manchester	100 m EAD freestyle

Scott Field is a Paralympic Games swimmer from South Africa who competed mainly in category S13 events.

Scott competed in two Paralympics as part of the South African swimming team. His first games were in the 2000 Summer Paralympic Games where he won silver in both the 50m and 100m freestyle, adding a bronze in the 100m butterfly and finishing fifth in the 200m medley. In the 2004 Summer Paralympic Games he again won silver in the 100m freestyle, but could only manage bronze in the 50m freestyle. He did however add silvers in both the 400m freestyle and 100m butterfly.
