= Swimming at the 2004 Summer Paralympics – Men's 4 × 100 metre freestyle relay 49pts =

Men's 4x100m Freestyle 49 pts at the XII Paralympic Games
- Paralympic Swimming
- Venue: Olympic Aquatic Centre
- Dates: 23 September 2004
- Competitors: 5
- Winning time: 3:45.97

Medalists
| 1st place, gold medalist(s) | | Dmytro Kuzmin; Sergiy Demchuk; Sergiy Klippert; Dmytro Aleksyeyev | Ukraine |
| 2nd place, silver medalist(s) | | Sergei Punko; Dmitri Kravtsevich; Raman Makarau; Yury Rudzenok | Belarus |
| 3rd place, bronze medalist(s) | | Yoshikazu Sakai; Kosei Egawa; Shusaku Sugiuchi; Junichi Kawai | Japan |

The Men's 4 x 100 metre freestyle relay 49pts swimming event at the 2004 Summer Paralympics was competed on 23 September. It was won by the team representing Ukraine.

== Final round ==
23 Sept. 2004, evening session

| Rank | Team | Time | Notes |
|---|---|---|---|
| 1st place, gold medalist(s) | Ukraine | 3:45.97 | WR |
| 2nd place, silver medalist(s) | Belarus | 3:55.73 | |
| 3rd place, bronze medalist(s) | Japan | 3:57.73 | |
| 4 | Spain | 3:59.11 | |
| 5 | Thailand | 4:16.68 | |

== Team Lists ==
| Ukraine; Dmytro Kuzmin; Sergiy Demchuk; Sergiy Klippert; Dmytro Aleksyeyev | Belarus; Sergei Punko; Dmitri Kravtsevich; Raman Makarau; Yury Rudzenok | Japan; Yoshikazu Sakai; Kosei Egawa; Shusaku Sugiuchi; Junichi Kawai | Spain; Enrique Floriano; Juan Diego Gil; Daniel Llambrich; Albert Gelis |
Thailand; Kitipong Sribunrueng; Sutat Sawattarn; Somchai Nakprom; Arpiwat Aranghiran
