= La Unión de Campos =

Coordinates: 42°05′N 5°19′W

La Unión de Campos, Spain
- Coat of arms

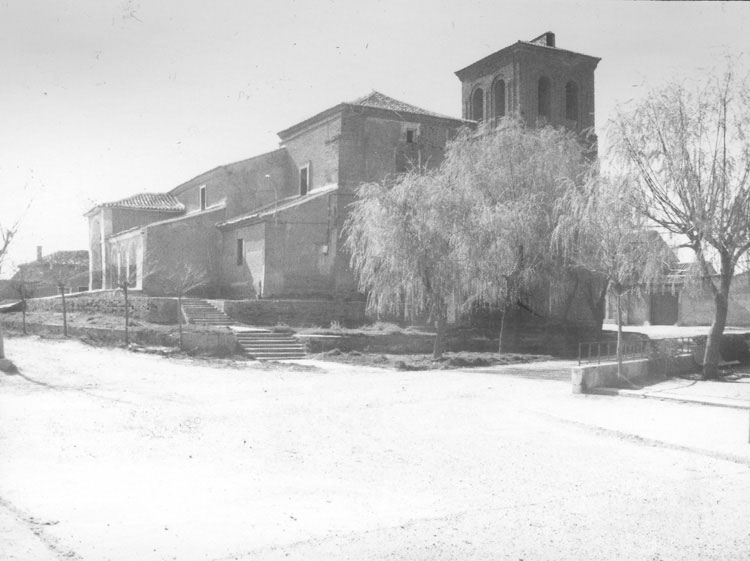
- church of Nuestra Señora de la Asunción
- Country: Spain
- Autonomous community: Castile and León
- Province: Valladolid
- Municipality: La Unión de Campos

Area
  - Total: 36 km^{2} (14 sq mi)

Population (2025-01-01)
  - Total: 210
  - Density: 5.8/km^{2} (15/sq mi)
- Time zone: UTC+1 (CET)
  - Summer (DST): UTC+2 (CEST)

La Unión de Campos is a municipality located in the province of Valladolid, Castile and León, Spain. According to the 2004 census (INE), the municipality has a population of 320 inhabitants.
