= Kosei Egawa =

Japanese Paralympic swimmer

Medal record

Swimming

Representing Japan

Paralympic Games
Bronze medal – third place	2004 Athens	4x100 metre freestyle - 49 pts

Kosei Egawa (恵川 光生, Egawa Kōsei) is a Paralympic swimmer from Japan competing mainly in category S12 events.

Kosei swam in six events at the 2004 Summer Paralympics as part of the Japanese team. He won a bronze medal as part of the Japanese squad in the 4 × 100 m freestyle and also finished fourth in the 4 × 100 m medley. Individually he competed in the 50m,100m and 400m freestyle missing the final in all three but did finish sixth in the 100m butterfly final.
