= Joe Wise =

American Paralympic swimmer

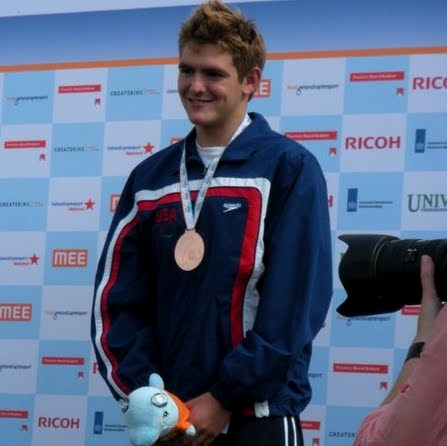

Personal information
- Full name: Joe Wise
- Nationality: USA
- Born: May 22, 1993 (age 33) Menlo Park, California
- Height: 6 ft 4 in (193 cm)
- Weight: 205 lb (93 kg)

Sport
- Sport: Swimming
- Strokes: Freestyle, Breastroke, I.M.
- Club: Santa Clara Swim Club
- College team: Loyola University Maryland
- Coach: Brian Loeffler

Joe Wise (born May 22, 1993) is a retired member of the U.S. Paralympic Swim Team and is a 19-time American Record Holder. He competed for the United States at both the 2008 and 2012 Summer Paralympics.

Wise swam for 10 years total, 7 years in Paralympic swimming.

== Personal life ==
In 2002, at the age of 9, Joe Wise was diagnosed with mitochondrial myopathy - a severe muscular disorder affecting his legs, hips, core muscles and lungs. At the early age of 9, doctors told him and his family he would not live to see the age of 15. In 8th grade, Joe was using a wheel chair, and having an extremely hard time walking. After doing a lot of leg exercises to strengthen his muscles, he was once again able to walk on his own. Joe now uses a life support volume ventilator every day which helps him breath because his lungs are so weak. Wise attended Loyola University Maryland in Baltimore, Maryland from 2011-2015 where he was a member of the men's swimming team. On December 3, 2013, Wise announced that he retired from swimming due to health issues. Wise now resides in Austin, Texas and works at Dell.

== Career ==
- 2012: Named to the 2012 U.S. Paralympic Team for London, England August 29 through September 9
- 2011: Pan Pac Para-Team Member
- 2010: United States President Volunteer Service Award Recipient
- 2008: U.S. Paralympic Team member, Swimming - Paralympic Games, Beijing China
- 2008: American record, 400m IM, 800m freestyle and 1,500m freestyle - CanAm Championships, Victoria, British Columbia
- 2007: Two fourth-place finishes, 100m back, 400m free - Parapan American Games, Rio de Janeiro, Brazil
- 2006: Gold medal, 400m free - U.S. Paralympics Swimming National Championships, San Antonio, Texas
- Ambassador for United Mitochondrial Disease Foundation
- Pacific Swimming LSC Athlete Representative
