= Luis Arévalo =

Spanish swimmer (born 1982)

Luis Arevalo
Personal information
- Full name: Luis Antonio Arevalo Espadas
- Nationality: Spain
- Born: 10 September 1982 (age 43) Miguelturra, Spain

Sport
- Sport: Swimming
Medal record
Men's swimming
Representing Spain
Paralympic Games
Bronze medal – third place	2000 Sydney	4x100m medley relay S11-13

Luis Antonio Arevalo Espadas (born September 10, 1982, in Miguelturra) is a student and vision impaired S13/SB13/SM13/B3 swimmer from Spain. He competed at the 2000 Summer Paralympics, winning a bronze in the 4 × 100 meter relay 49 Points race. He raced at the 2004 Summer Paralympics. He also competed at the 2008 Summer Paralympics where he failed to medal.
