= World Para Swimming Championships =

World championships for swimming

The World Para Swimming Championships, known also as the IPC Swimming World Championships, are the world championships for swimming where athletes with a disability compete. They are organised by the International Paralympic Committee (IPC). Previously on a four-year rotation, the championships are now held biennially, a year after the regional championships and year prior to the Paralympic Games.

In November 2016, the IPC (which serves as the international federation for 10 disability sports, including swimming) adopted the "World Para" brand for all 10 sports. The world championship events in all of these sports were rebranded as "World Para" championships.

== History ==
=== World Para Swimming Championships (Long Course) ===
The first World Para Swimming Championships were held from 2-7 December, 2017, in Mexico City; the first IPC Swimming Championships (the former title of the championships) were held from 14-26 July, 1990, in Assen, one year after the IPC was founded.

Number	Year	Venue	Dates	Best nation
IPC Swimming Championships
1	1990	(Netherlands) Assen	14 – 26 July	unknown
2	1994	(Malta) Valletta	1 – 9 November	unknown
3	1998	(New Zealand) Christchurch	7 – 17 October	Canada
4	2002	(Argentina) Mar del Plata	3 – 12 December	Great Britain
5	2006	(South Africa) Durban	2 – 8 December	United States
6	2010	(Netherlands) Eindhoven	15 – 21 August	Ukraine
7	2013	(Canada) Montreal	11 – 17 August	Ukraine
8	2015	(United Kingdom) Glasgow	13 – 19 July	Russia
World Para Swimming Championships
9	2017	Mexico City	2 – 7 December	China
10	2019	(United Kingdom) London	9 – 15 September	Italy
11	2022	(Portugal) Madeira	12 – 18 June	Italy
12	2023	(United Kingdom) Manchester	31 July – 6 August	Italy
13	2025	Singapore	21 – 27 September	Italy

=== World Para Swimming Championships (Short Course) ===
The first (and only, as of 2023) short course world championships were held in December 2009, in Rio de Janeiro.

Number	Year	Venue	Dates	Best nation
1	2009	(Brazil) Rio de Janeiro	29 Nov – 5 Dec	Russia

== See also ==
- List of IPC world records in swimming
- World Para Swimming European Championships
- Swimming at the Summer Paralympics
