= Dervis Konuralp =

British Paralympic swimmer

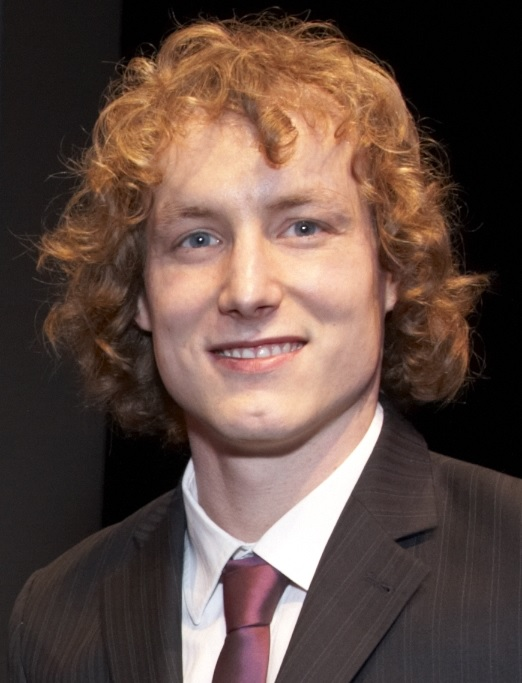

Sport
- Country: United Kingdom
- Sport: Paralympic swimming
- Disability: Macular dystrophy Stargardt's
- Disability class: S13
- Coached by: Michelle Weltman
Medal record
sport
Representing United Kingdom
Paralympic Games
Bronze medal – third place	2000 Sydney	50m freestyle S13
Bronze medal – third place	2004 Athens	200m individual medley SM13
World Championships
Gold medal – first place	2002 Mar del Plata	4x100m medley relay 49pts
Silver medal – second place	2002 Mar del Plata	100m breaststroke SB13
Bronze medal – third place	2002 Mar del Plata	50m freestyle S13
Bronze medal – third place	2002 Mar del Plata	100m butterfly S13

Dervis Konuralp (born 1980) is a British Paralympic swimmer who has represented Great Britain at four Paralympic Games, three World Championships and four European Championships.

== Biography ==
Konuralp was born in Hackney to a Turkish Cypriot father and an English mother. At the age of nine, Dervis was diagnosed with an eye condition called Macular Dystrophy Stargardts, which meant that he was losing the use of his central vision in both eyes. After learning of his visual impairment, Konuralp began to learn how to swim with his primary school. Dervis would go on to compete for Hackney in the London Youth Games as a visually impaired disability swimmer.

Konuralp's swimming career started when he joined Elaine Barrett a fellow Paralympian, both being coached by Michelle Weltman. Konuralp represented Great Britain in four Paralympic Games. The first of which was at the age of only 15 years old, at the 1996 Summer Paralympics. Konuralp has also competed at three World Championships and four European Championships, winning a total of 35 major international medals, 14 of which Gold. He became World Champion and World record holder at just 17 years of age.

Konuralp was a London 2012 Olympic and 2012 Paralympic Ambassador. As part of this role, Konuralp delivered motivational keynote speeches in various environments. These included schools, sports clubs, after dinner events and corporate events.

He is a member of the London Youth Games Hall of Fame from 2009.

Konuralp graduated from City University (University of London) in Computer Science (BSc).
