= Daniel Sharp (swimmer) =

New Zealand swimmer

Personal information
- Born: 10 December 1987 (age 38) Auckland, New Zealand
Medal record
Men's para swimming
Representing New Zealand
Paralympic Games
Silver medal – second place	2008 Beijing	100 m breaststroke SB13
Silver medal – second place	2012 London	100 m breaststroke SB13
Bronze medal – third place	2004 Athens	100 m breaststroke SB13

Daniel Sharp (born 10 December 1987 in Auckland) is a former swimmer on New Zealand's paralympic team. He competed at the 2004 Summer Paralympics in Athens, the 2008 Summer Paralympics in Beijing, and the 2012 Summer Paralympics in London.

Winning a bronze medal in 2004 for the 100 m breaststroke, he competed again in 2008 and won a silver medal. He won silver again for the same event in 2012.

Sharp currently holds the world record in the SB13 category over 50 m breaststroke.
