= Walter Wu =

Canadian Paralympic swimmer

Personal information
- Born: 14 August 1972 (age 54)
- Occupation: Paralympic swimmer
- Height: 176 cm (5 ft 9 in)
- Weight: 86 kg (190 lb)

Sport
- Country: Canada
- Sport: Paralympic Swimmer
Medal record
Men's Swimming
Representing Canada
Paralympic Games
Gold medal – first place	1996 Atlanta	100m Freestyle
Gold medal – first place	1996 Atlanta	400m Freestyle
Gold medal – first place	1996 Atlanta	1000m Freestyle
Gold medal – first place	1996 Atlanta	100m Butterfly
Gold medal – first place	1996 Atlanta	100m Backstroke
Gold medal – first place	1996 Atlanta	200m Individual Medley
Gold medal – first place	2000 Sydney	100m Backstroke
Gold medal – first place	2000 Sydney	100m Butterfly
Gold medal – first place	2004 Athens	400m Freestyle
Silver medal – second place	2000 Sydney	400m Freestyle
Silver medal – second place	2000 Sydney	200m Individual Medley
Silver medal – second place	2004 Athens	100m Backstroke
Silver medal – second place	2004 Athens	200m Individual Medley
Bronze medal – third place	1996 Atlanta	50m Freestyle
Bronze medal – third place	2000 Sydney	100m Freestyle
- Updated on 15 August 2014

Walter Wu
- Traditional Chinese: 胡緯豐
- Simplified Chinese: 胡纬丰
Transcriptions
Standard Mandarin
- Hanyu Pinyin: Hú Wěifēng
Yue: Cantonese
- Jyutping: Wu^{4} Wai^{6} Fung^{1}

Walter Wu (born 14 August 1972) is an S13 classified Canadian swimmer who has competed and set records at the 1996, 2000, and 2004 Summer Paralympics. He won 14 Paralympic medals before retiring in 2004 after the Athens Paralympic Games. His accolades included selection as torch bearer, member of the Terry Fox Hall of Fame, and BC Disabled Athlete of the Year. He has spent time as a public speaker to local schools since retirement from active sports competition.

== Personal life ==
Walter Wu was born on 14 August 1972 in Richmond, British Columbia. He is classified as S13 because of optic nerve dysfunction, meaning that he is considered to be legally blind. At the age of eight, he moved to Richmond, British Columbia where he still resides today. After trying a variety of sports, Wu finally settled with swimming. He wanted to swim "because it was an individual sport; if you fail it's because of yourself; if you excel it's because of yourself" Wu said. Since retiring from competition in 2004,

Wu has given a speech at a local school part of the RCMP's Sports Event which brings athletes to schools to give inspiration. Wu also has a part-time job at Home Depot which he has been sponsored. He worked three years in the phone centre and has been doing shipping and receiving work since 2004. He won the BC Disabled Athlete of the Year, was featured in the Terry Fox Hall of Fame and was a torchbearer at the 2010 Winter Paralympics. He added that "He is humbled and proud of that honour as well."

== Career ==
Walter Wu is a S13 classified swimmer. He competed in three Paralympic Games, retiring after the 2004 Athens Games. He said, "I miss competing, traveling and making international friends, but I don't miss the grueling training."

=== 1996 Paralympics ===
At the age of 24, Wu won six gold and one bronze medals, breaking two World Records and two Paralympic Records, and becoming Canada's most decorated athlete of the games. He set the world records in the 200-metre individual medley (2:19.83) and 100-metre backstroke (1:05.55). After he won, he said, "That was an incredible feeling. It's not quite the rush of riding on a roller coaster, but standing on the podium when they play the national anthem chokes you up. It makes you proud that the hard work has paid off."

=== 2000 Paralympics ===
A shoulder injury of his right shoulder caused Wu trouble in early 2000, three months before the Sydney 2000 Paralympic Games. Wu's coach, Craig McCord, played a key role in Wu's return to form. Wu said, "In some ways I think he has more confidence in me that I have... He was always under the impression I was going to do well at the Olympic trials and time-wise it was one of my best events ever." After being selected to compete at the 2000 Paralympic Games, Wu won five medals in Sydney, including golds in the 100m backstroke and the 100m butterfly, silvers in the 400m freestyle and the 200m individual medley, and a bronze in the 100m freestyle.

=== 2004 Paralympics ===
Still suffering from another shoulder injury that occurred in 2003, Wu was not expected to compete in the 400m freestyle, but he made the decision to participate, telling his coach, "if I have to go to hospital to win this race, I am willing to do it." He ended up winning the gold medal, coming first. He did not need to go to the hospital but did require medical treatment for 25 minutes after he finished. Other than his gold medal, he also won two more silver medals in 100m backstroke and 200m individual medley.
