= Shusaku Sugiuchi =

Japanese Paralympic swimmer

Medal record

Men's swimming

Representing Japan

Paralympic Games
Bronze medal – third place	2004 Athens	4x100 m freestyle 49pts

Shusaku Sugiuchi (杉内 周作, Sugiuchi Shūsaku) is a Paralympic swimmer from Japan competing mainly in category S13 events.

Shusaku was a member of the Japanese swimming team at the 2004 Summer Paralympics he competed in a total of six events. He won bronze as part of the Japanese 4 × 100 m freestyle team and finished fourth as part of the 4 × 100 m medley team. He also swam in the 50m freestyle, 100m freestyle, failing to make the final in either. He finished eighth in the 100m butterfly and fifth in the 100m breaststroke.
