= Daniel Clausner =

German Paralympic swimmer

Personal information
- Born: 4 January 1985 (age 41) Leipzig, Germany

Sport
- Country: Germany
- Sport: Paralympic swimming
- Disability class: S13
- Club: BFV Ascota Chemnitz
- Coached by: Gunter Thiele
Medal record
Paralympic swimming
Representing Germany
Paralympic Games
Gold medal – first place	2004 Athens	100m breaststroke SB13
Gold medal – first place	2004 Athens	200m individual medley SM13
Bronze medal – third place	2004 Athens	100m freestyle S13
World Championships
Silver medal – second place	2006 Durban	50m freestyle S13
Silver medal – second place	2006 Durban	200m individual medley SM13
Bronze medal – third place	2002 Mar del Plata	400m freestyle S13
Bronze medal – third place	2002 Mar del Plata	100m breaststroke SB13
Bronze medal – third place	2006 Durban	100m freestyle S13
Bronze medal – third place	2006 Durban	100m backstroke S13
Bronze medal – third place	2006 Durban	100m breaststroke SB13

Daniel Clausner (born 1 April 1985) is a retired German Paralympic swimmer who competed in international elite events. He is a double Paralympic champion and a seven-time World medalist.
