= List of IPC world records in swimming – Women's short course =

The world records in disability swimming are ratified by the International Paralympic Committee (IPC). These are the fastest performances in swimming events at meets sanctioned by the IPC.

This article lists the women's world records in short course competition. The International Paralympic Committee provides information on the current world records at their official site, though the times present sometimes differ from those provided elsewhere.

== 50 m freestyle ==
| Event | Class | Time | Name | Nation | Date | Meet | Location | Ref |
|---|---|---|---|---|---|---|---|---|
| 50 m freestyle | S1 | 54.15 | Ingrid Thunem | Norway | 5 April 2014 | - | Stavanger, Norway | |
| 50 m freestyle | S2 | 56.02 | Ingrid Thunem | Norway | 19 March 2015 | - | Kristiansand, Norway | |
| 50 m freestyle | S3 | 41.68 | Rachael Watson | Australia | 26 July 2025 | - | Brisbane, Australia | |
| 50 m freestyle | S4 | 40.74 | Rachael Watson | Australia | 24 October 2019 | - | Melbourne, Australia | |
| 50 m freestyle | S5 | 37.39 | Teresa Perales Fernandez | Spain | 14 December 2003 | - | Benicarló, Spain | |
| 50 m freestyle | S6 | 34.22 | Eleanor Robinson | Great Britain | 9 December 2017 | - | Manchester, United Kingdom | |
| 50 m freestyle | S7 | 32.17 | Mallory Weggemann | United States | 2 December 2009 | IPC World Championships | Rio de Janeiro, Brazil | |
| 50 m freestyle | S8 | 30.41 | Maddison Elliott | Australia | 23 August 2013 | - | Sydney, Australia | |
| 50 m freestyle | S9 | 28.20 | Sophie Pascoe | New Zealand | 8 October 2020 | - | Hamilton, New Zealand | |
| 50 m freestyle | S10 | 26.90 | Callie-Ann Warrington | Great Britain | 12 December 2025 | - | Sheffield, United Kingdom | |
| 50 m freestyle | S11 | 29.57 | Liesette Bruinsma | Netherlands | 15 December 2023 | - | The Hague, Netherlands | |
| 50 m freestyle | S12 | 26.54 | Oxana Savchenko | Russia | 2 December 2009 | IPC World Championships | Rio de Janeiro, Brazil | |
| 50 m freestyle | S13 | 27.07 | Carlotta Gilli | Italy | 30 November 2019 | - | Portici, Italy | |

Legend: # – Record awaiting ratification by IPC; e – equalled existing record;
Records not set in finals: h – heat; sf – semifinal; b – B final; † – en route to final mark; so – swim-off

== 100 m freestyle ==
| Event | Class | Time | | Name | Nation | Date | Meet | Location | Ref |
|---|---|---|---|---|---|---|---|---|---|
| 100 m freestyle | S1 | 1:58.83 | | Ingrid Thunem | Norway | 6 April 2014 | - | Stavanger, Norway | |
| 100 m freestyle | S2 | 2:21.08 | | Yip Pin Xiu | China | 24 August 2022 | - | Sydney, Australia | |
| 100 m freestyle | S3 | 1:34.29 | | Rachael Watson | Australia | 26 July 2025 | - | Brisbane, Australia | |
| 100 m freestyle | S4 | 1:28.75 | | Arjola Trimi | Italy | 2 April 2017 | - | Naples, Italy | |
| 100 m freestyle | S5 | 1:21.61 | | Arianna Talamona | Spain | 1 December 2019 | - | Portici, Italy | |
| 100 m freestyle | S6 | 1:16.72 | | Maisie Summers-Newton | Great Britain | 9 December 2017 | - | Manchester, United Kingdom | |
| 100 m freestyle | S7 | 1:08.56 | | Mallory Weggemann | United States | 3 December 2009 | World Championships | Rio de Janeiro, Brazil | |
| 100 m freestyle | S8 | 1:05.60 | = | Lakeisha Patterson | Australia | 19 August 2017 | - | Brisbane, Australia | |
| 100 m freestyle | S8 | 1:05.60 | = | Claire Supiot | France | 13 December 2020 | - | Angers, France | |
| 100 m freestyle | S9 | 1:01.95 | | Stephanie Millward | Great Britain | 5 December 2009 | World Championships | Rio de Janeiro, Brazil | |
| 100 m freestyle | S10 | 59.29 | | Callie-Ann Warrington | Great Britain | 13 December 2025 | Swim England National Winter Championships | Sheffield, United Kingdom | |
| 100 m freestyle | S11 | 1:04.30 | | Liesette Bruinsma | Netherlands | 21 December 2024 | - | The Hague, Netherlands | |
| 100 m freestyle | S12 | 58.60 | | Oxana Savchenko | Russia | 5 December 2009 | World Championships | Rio de Janeiro, Brazil | |
| 100 m freestyle | S13 | 57.84 | | Katja Dedekind | Australia | 26 August 2022 | - | Sydney, Australia | |
| 100 m freestyle | S14 | 55.64 | | Poppy Maskill | Great Britain | 13 December 2025 | Swim England National Winter Championships | Sheffield, United Kingdom | |

Legend: # – Record awaiting ratification by IPC; e – equalled existing record;
Records not set in finals: h – heat; sf – semifinal; b – B final; † – en route to final mark; so – swim-off

== 200 m freestyle ==
| Event | Class | Time | Name | Nation | Date | Meet | Location | Ref |
|---|---|---|---|---|---|---|---|---|
| 200 m freestyle | S1 | 5:02.37 | Ingrid Thunem | Norway | 13 March 2016 | - | Stavanger, Norway | |
| 200 m freestyle | S2 | 4:57.81 | Yip Pin Xiu | Singapore | 24 August 2022 | - | Sydney, Australia | |
| 200 m freestyle | S3 | 3:27.03 | Lisette Teunissen | Netherlands | 30 October 2015 | Dutch Championships | Tilburg, Netherlands | |
| 200 m freestyle | S4 | 3:12.01 | Gina Boettcher | Germany | 15 November 2019 | - | Remscheid, Germany | |
| 200 m freestyle | S5 | 2:47.71 | Monica Boggioni | Italy | 13 November 2022 | - | Lodi, Italy | |
| 200 m freestyle | S6 | 2:39.96 | Verena Schott | Germany | 20 November 2022 | - | Düsseldorf, Germany | |
| 200 m freestyle | S7 | 2:29.41 | Mallory Weggemann | United States | 29 November 2009 | IPC World Championships | Rio de Janeiro, Brazil | |
| 200 m freestyle | S8 | 2:20.17 | Jessica Long | United States | 1 December 2009 | IPC World Championships | Rio de Janeiro, Brazil | |
| 200 m freestyle | S9 | 2:17.07 | Ellie Cole | Australia | 2 December 2009 | IPC World Championships | Rio de Janeiro, Brazil | |
| 200 m freestyle | S10 | 2:05.38 | Aurelie Rivard | Canada | 30 November 2019 | - | Montreal, Canada | |
| 200 m freestyle | S11 | 2:18.24 | Liesette Bruinsma | Netherlands | 17 December 2023 | - | The Hague, Netherlands | |
| 200 m freestyle | S12 | 2:10.17 | Naomi Schwarz | Germany | 17 November 2017 | German Para Championships | Remscheid, Germany | |
| 200 m freestyle | S13 | 2:08.53 | Valérie Grand'Maison | Canada | 26 April 2008 | - | Montreal, Canada | |
| 200 m freestyle | S14 | 2:03.71 | Jessica-Jane Applegate | Great Britain | 10 December 2017 | - | Manchester, United Kingdom | |

Legend: # – Record awaiting ratification by IPC; e – equalled existing record;
Records not set in finals: h – heat; sf – semifinal; b – B final; † – en route to final mark; so – swim-off

== 400 m freestyle ==
| Event | Class | Time | | Name | Nation | Date | Meet | Location | Ref |
|---|---|---|---|---|---|---|---|---|---|
| 400 m freestyle | S6 | 5:27.58 | | Eleanor Simmonds | Great Britain | 24 November 2013 | - | Sheffield, United Kingdom | |
| 400 m freestyle | S7 | 5:08.53 | | Mallory Weggemann | United States | 29 November 2009 | - | Rio de Janeiro, Brazil | |
| 400 m freestyle | S8 | 4:42.98 | | Lakeisha Patterson | Australia | 4 November 2016 | - | Brisbane, Australia | |
| 400 m freestyle | S9 | 4:37.98 | | Ellie Cole | Australia | 2 July 2011 | - | Adelaide, Australia | |
| 400 m freestyle | S10 | 4:26.69 | | Aurelie Rivard | Canada | 1 December 2019 | - | Montreal, Canada | |
| 400 m freestyle | S11 | 5:02.60 | | Liesette Bruinsma | Netherlands | 21 December 2018 | - | Tilburg, Netherlands | |
| 400 m freestyle | S12 | 4:28.94 | | Hannah Russell | Great Britain | 2 March 2013 | - | Sheffield, United Kingdom | |
| 400 m freestyle | S13 | 4:30.66 | | Katja Dedekind | Australia | 27 November 2020 | - | Brisbane, Australia | |
| 400 m freestyle | S14 | 4:32.76 | | Amber Van der Kruk | Netherlands | 15 December 2023 | - | The Hague, Netherlands | |
| 400 m freestyle | S14 | 4:30.12 | # | Pernilla Lindberg | Sweden | 28 November 2025 | Nordic Championships | Reykjavík, Iceland | |

Legend: # – Record awaiting ratification by IPC; e – equalled existing record;
Records not set in finals: h – heat; sf – semifinal; b – B final; † – en route to final mark; so – swim-off

== 800 m freestyle ==
| Event | Class | Time | Name | Nation | Date | Meet | Location | Ref |
|---|---|---|---|---|---|---|---|---|
| 800 m freestyle | S6 | 14:09.59 | Marie Dannhaeuser | Canada | 24 November 2002 | - | London, United Kingdom | |
| 800 m freestyle | S7 | 11:51.58 | Moorea Longstaff | Canada | 19 February 2000 | - | Kamloops, Canada | |
| 800 m freestyle | S8 | 10:55.33 | Emma Hollis | Great Britain | 11 November 2011 | - | Sheffield, United Kingdom | |
| 800 m freestyle | S9 | 8:47.59 | Natalie du Toit | South Africa | 9 August 2009 | - | Pietermaritzburg, South Africa | |
| 800 m freestyle | S10 | 10:03.35 | Claudia Hengst | Germany | 24 May 2003 | - | Bregenz, Austria | |
| 800 m freestyle | S11 | 10:42.04 | Daniela Schulte | Germany | 14 November 2009 | - | Wuppertal, Germany | |
| 800 m freestyle | S12 | 9:57.57 | Naomi Schwarz | Germany | 18 September 2011 | - | Remscheid, Germany | |
| 800 m freestyle | S13 | 9:42.48 | Valérie Grand'Maison | Canada | 23 November 2007 | - | Montreal, Canada | |

Legend: # – Record awaiting ratification by IPC; e – equalled existing record;
Records not set in finals: h – heat; sf – semifinal; b – B final; † – en route to final mark; so – swim-off

== 1500 m freestyle ==
| Event | Class | Time | Name | Nation | Date | Meet | Location | Ref |
|---|---|---|---|---|---|---|---|---|
| 1500 m freestyle | S6 | | | - | | | | |
| 1500 m freestyle | S7 | 22:52.80 | Verena Schott | Germany | 20 November 2015 | - | Remscheid, Germany | |
| 1500 m freestyle | S8 | 22:29.14 | Chantal Boonacker | Netherlands | 23 January 2005 | - | Winterswijk, Netherlands | |
| 1500 m freestyle | S9 | 16:45.51 | Natalie Du Toit | South Africa | 7 August 2009 | - | Pietermaritzburg, South Africa | |
| 1500 m freestyle | S10 | 19:14.52 | Julia Benito de Tena | Spain | 26 January 2019 | - | Pozuelo de Alarcon, Spain | |
| 1500 m freestyle | S11 | 23:01.06 | Chantal Cavin | Switzerland | 29 January 2005 | - | Uster, Switzerland | |
| 1500 m freestyle | S12 | | | - | | | | |
| 1500 m freestyle | S13 | 19:11.68 | Ariadna Edo Beltrán | Spain | 25 January 2020 | - | Valdemoro, Spain | |

Legend: # – Record awaiting ratification by IPC; e – equalled existing record;
Records not set in finals: h – heat; sf – semifinal; b – B final; † – en route to final mark; so – swim-off

== 50 m backstroke ==
| Event | Class | Time | Name | Nation | Date | Meet | Location | Ref |
|---|---|---|---|---|---|---|---|---|
| 50 m backstroke | S1 | 1:07.58 | Ingrid Thunem | Norway | 13 March 2016 | - | Stavanger, Norway | |
| 50 m backstroke | S2 | 1:06.87 | Yip Pin Xiu | Singapore | 27 August 2022 | - | Sydney, Australia | |
| 50 m backstroke | S3 | 50.59 | Lisette Teunissen | Netherlands | 30 October 2015 | Dutch Championships | Tilburg, Netherlands | |
| 50 m backstroke | S4 | 52.90 | Lisette Teunissen | Netherlands | 2 November 2013 | - | Dordrecht, Netherlands | |
| 50 m backstroke | S5 | 42.64 | Bela Trebinova | Czech Republic | 2 December 2009 | IPC World Championships | Rio de Janeiro, Brazil | |
| 50 m backstroke | S6 | 39.57 | Verena Schott | Germany | 16 November 2019 | - | Remscheid, Germany | |
| 50 m backstroke | S7 | 35.20 | Danielle Dorris | Canada | 8 August 2025 | - | Sherbrooke, Canada | |
| 50 m backstroke | S8 | 35.89 | Cleo Keijzer | Netherlands | 21 December 2017 | - | Hoofddorp, Netherlands | |
| 50 m backstroke | S9 | 31.18 | Mary Jibb | Canada | 12 December 2025 | - | Toronto, Canada | |
| 50 m backstroke | S10 | 30.49 | Sophie Pascoe | New Zealand | 30 September 2013 | - | Wellington, New Zealand | |
| 50 m backstroke | S11 | 36.43 | Mary Fisher | New Zealand | 30 June 2013 | - | Sydney, Australia | |
| 50 m backstroke | S12 | 32.60 | Maria Delgado | Spain | 27 January 2019 | - | Pozuelo de Alarcon, Spain | |
| 50 m backstroke | S13 | 30.33 | Katja Dedekind | Australia | 27 November 2020 | - | Brisbane, Australia | |

Legend: # – Record awaiting ratification by IPC; e – equalled existing record;
Records not set in finals: h – heat; sf – semifinal; b – B final; † – en route to final mark; so – swim-off

== 100 m backstroke ==
| Event | Class | Time | Name | Nation | Date | Meet | Location | Ref |
|---|---|---|---|---|---|---|---|---|
| 100 m backstroke | S1 | 2:20.38 | Ingrid Thunem | Norway | 10 March 2016 | - | Stavanger, Norway | |
| 100 m backstroke | S2 | 2:20.57 | Yip Pin Xiu | Singapore | 25 August 2022 | - | Sydney, Australia | |
| 100 m backstroke | S3 | 1:46.30 | Lisette Teunissen | Netherlands | 31 October 2015 | - | Tilburg, Netherlands | |
| 100 m backstroke | S4 | 1:47.97 | Lisette Teunissen | Netherlands | 8 November 2024 | - | Tilburg, Netherlands | |
| 100 m backstroke | S5 | 1:31.77 | Arianna Talamona | Italy | 30 November 2019 | - | Portici, Italy | |
| 100 m backstroke | S6 | 1:23.52 | Verena Schott | Germany | 17 November 2019 | - | Remscheid, Germany | |
| 100 m backstroke | S7 | 1:14.97 | Rachel Lardiere | France | 5 December 2009 | IPC World Championships | Rio de Janeiro, Brazil | |
| 100 m backstroke | S8 | 1:16.60 | Heather Frederiksen | Great Britain | 1 November 2008 | - | Sheffield, United Kingdom | |
| 100 m backstroke | S9 | 1:07.37 | Alice Tai | Great Britain | 10 December 2017 | - | Manchester, United Kingdom | |
| 100 m backstroke | S10 | 1:05.50 | Katie Cosgriffe | Canada | 8 February 2025 | - | Markham, Canada | |
| 100 m backstroke | S11 | 1:15.81 | Irene Van Drimmelen | Netherlands | 22 October 2026 | - | Rotterdam, Netherlands | |
| 100 m backstroke | S12 | 1:13.45 | Ana Garcia-Arcicollar | Spain | 15 Dec 2007 | - | Benicarló, Spain | |
| 100 m backstroke | S13 | 1:10.56 | Chelsey Gotell | Canada | 28 Feb 2003 | - | Halifax Regional Municipality, Canada | |

Legend: # – Record awaiting ratification by IPC; e – equalled existing record;
Records not set in finals: h – heat; sf – semifinal; b – B final; † – en route to final mark; so – swim-off

== 200 m backstroke ==
| Event | Class | Time | | Name | Nation | Date | Meet | Location | Ref |
|---|---|---|---|---|---|---|---|---|---|
| 200 m backstroke | S6 | | | | - | | | | |
| 200 m backstroke | S7 | 3:06.85 | | Kristin Hakonardottir | Iceland | 10 Feb 2001 | - | Reykjavík, Iceland | |
| 200 m backstroke | S8 | 3:02.01 | | Lichelle Clarke | Australia | 8 Aug 2004 | - | Warragul, VIC, Australia | |
| 200 m backstroke | S9 | 2:22.72 | | Stéphanie Dixon | Canada | 27 Feb 2005 | - | Edmonton, Canada | |
| 200 m backstroke | S10 | 2:32.94 | | Sarah Bailey | Great Britain | 14 Mar 1998 | - | Sheffield, United Kingdom | |
| 200 m backstroke | S11 | 3:04.78 | | Raquel Salvador | Spain | 7 Mar 1998 | - | Madrid, Spain | |
| 200 m backstroke | S12 | 2:47.36 | | Ana Garcia-Arcicollar | Spain | 10 Mar 2001 | - | Zamora, Spain | |
| 200 m backstroke | S13 | 2:29.30 | | Chelsey Gotell | Canada | 2 Mar 2003 | - | Halifax Regional Municipality, Canada | |
| 200 m backstroke | S13 | 2:21.20 | '#' | Róisín Ní Ríain | Ireland | 16 December 2022 | Irish Championships | Dublin, Ireland | |
| 200 m backstroke | S14 | 2:20.54 | | Marlou van der Kulk | Netherlands | 1 November 2015 | - | Tilburg, Netherlands | |

Legend: # – Record awaiting ratification by IPC; e – equalled existing record;
Records not set in finals: h – heat; sf – semifinal; b – B final; † – en route to final mark; so – swim-off

== 50 m breaststroke ==
| Event | Class | Time | Name | Nation | Date | Meet | Location | Ref |
|---|---|---|---|---|---|---|---|---|
| 50 m breaststroke | SB1 | 2:39.78 | Vivien Mullett | Great Britain | 17 Jun 1995 | - | Darlington, United Kingdom | |
| 50 m breaststroke | SB2 | 1:21.14 | Christina Ziegler | Germany | 27 Nov 2004 | - | Chemnitz, Germany | |
| 50 m breaststroke | SB3 | 58.67 | Margaret McEleny | Great Britain | 24 Apr 1998 | - | Eskilstuna, Sweden | |
| 50 m breaststroke | SB4 | 1:11.29 | Jane Stidever | Great Britain | 1 Nov 2008 | - | Sheffield, United Kingdom | |
| 50 m breaststroke | SB5 | 44.79 | Kirsten Bruhn | Germany | 15 Nov 2008 | - | Chemnitz, Germany | |
| 50 m breaststroke | SB6 | 46.71 | Elizabeth Johnson | Great Britain | 3 Nov 2007 | - | Sheffield, United Kingdom | |
| 50 m breaststroke | SB7 | 41.35 | Jessica Long | United States | 3 Dec 2009 | IPC World Championships | Rio de Janeiro, Brazil | |
| 50 m breaststroke | SB8 | 37.35 | Sisse Egeborg | Denmark | 15 Nov 2003 | - | Stavanger, Norway | |
| 50 m breaststroke | SB9 | 38.60 | Sarah Bailey | Great Britain | 1 Nov 2003 | - | Sheffield, United Kingdom | |
| 50 m breaststroke | SB10 | 35.14 | Sophie Pascoe | New Zealand | 29 September 2013 | New Zealand Championships | Wellington, New Zealand | |
| 50 m breaststroke | SB11 | 41.76 | Elaine Barrett | Great Britain | 9 Nov 2002 | - | Sheffield, United Kingdom | |
| 50 m breaststroke | SB12 | 40.69 | Deborah Font Jimenez | Spain | 10 Mar 2001 | - | Zamora, Spain | |
| 50 m breaststroke | SB13 | 35.24 | Kirby Cote | Canada | 20 Feb 2004 | - | Vancouver, Canada | |

Legend: # – Record awaiting ratification by IPC; e – equalled existing record;
Records not set in finals: h – heat; sf – semifinal; b – B final; † – en route to final mark; so – swim-off

== 100 m breaststroke ==
| Event | Class | Time | Name | Nation | Date | Meet | Location | Ref |
|---|---|---|---|---|---|---|---|---|
| 100 m breaststroke | SB1 | | | - | | | | |
| 100 m breaststroke | SB2 | 2:49.31 | Christina Ziegler | Germany | 27 Nov 2004 | - | Chemnitz, Germany | |
| 100 m breaststroke | SB3 | 2:11.52 | Margaret McEleny | Great Britain | 7 Nov 1998 | - | Darlington, United Kingdom | |
| 100 m breaststroke | SB4 | 1:55.83 | Jenny Newstead | New Zealand | 1 Jun 1996 | - | Dunedin, New Zealand | |
| 100 m breaststroke | SB5 | 1:39.70 | Kirsten Bruhn | Germany | 15 Nov 2008 | - | Chemnitz, Germany | |
| 100 m breaststroke | SB6 | 1:41.21 | Elizabeth Johnson | Great Britain | 4 Nov 2007 | - | Sheffield, United Kingdom | |
| 100 m breaststroke | SB7 | 1:26.85 | Jessica Long | United States | 3 Dec 2009 | IPC World Championships | Rio de Janeiro, Brazil | |
| 100 m breaststroke | SB8 | 1:19.13 | Sisse Egeborg | Denmark | 14 Nov 2003 | - | Stavanger, Norway | |
| 100 m breaststroke | SB9 | 1:22.36 | Sarai Gascon Moreno | Spain | 17 Mar 2007 | - | Plasencia, Spain | |
| 100 m breaststroke | SB11 | 1:28.45 | Elaine Barrett | Great Britain | 26 Aug 2004 | - | Manchester, United Kingdom | |
| 100 m breaststroke | SB12 | 1:22.87 | Deborah Font Jimenez | Spain | 14 Dec 2003 | - | Tarragona, Spain | |
| 100 m breaststroke | SB13 | 1:15.42 | Kirby Cote | Canada | 25 Feb 2002 | - | New Westminster, Canada | |

Legend: # – Record awaiting ratification by IPC; e – equalled existing record;
Records not set in finals: h – heat; sf – semifinal; b – B final; † – en route to final mark; so – swim-off

== 200 m breaststroke ==
| Event | Class | Time | Name | Nation | Date | Meet | Location | Ref |
|---|---|---|---|---|---|---|---|---|
| 200 m breaststroke | SB4 | | | - | | | | |
| 200 m breaststroke | SB5 | | | - | | | | |
| 200 m breaststroke | SB6 | 3:38.16 | Elizabeth Johnson | Great Britain | 22 May 2005 | - | Hatfield, United Kingdom | |
| 200 m breaststroke | SB7 | 3:35.06 | Kristin Hakonardottir | Iceland | 24 Nov 2001 | - | Reykjavík, Iceland | |
| 200 m breaststroke | SB8 | 2:46.78 | Sisse Egeborg | Denmark | 23 Nov 2003 | - | Holbæk, Denmark | |
| 200 m breaststroke | SB9 | 2:50.97 | Sarai Gascon Moreno | Spain | 9 Apr 2006 | - | Palma de Mallorca, Spain | |
| 200 m breaststroke | SB11 | 3:19.57 | Elaine Barrett | Great Britain | 17 Apr 1999 | - | Mansfield, United Kingdom | |
| 200 m breaststroke | SB12 | 3:11.38 | Jessica Rodriguez | Spain | 8 Mar 1998 | - | Madrid, Spain | |
| 200 m breaststroke | SB13 | 2:43.53 | Kirby Cote | Canada | 24 Feb 2002 | - | New Westminster, Canada | |

Legend: # – Record awaiting ratification by IPC; e – equalled existing record;
Records not set in finals: h – heat; sf – semifinal; b – B final; † – en route to final mark; so – swim-off

== 50 m butterfly ==
| Event | Class | Time | | Name | Nation | Date | Meet | Location | Ref |
|---|---|---|---|---|---|---|---|---|---|
| 50 m butterfly | S1 | | | | - | | | | |
| 50 m butterfly | S2 | | | | - | | | | |
| 50 m butterfly | S3 | 1:14.58 | | Elise Olsen | Norway | 4 Mar 2001 | - | Oslo, Norway | |
| 50 m butterfly | S4 | 56.45 | | Sandra Erikson | Sweden | 4 May 2004 | - | Halmstad, Sweden | |
| 50 m butterfly | S5 | 42.96 | | Teresa Perales Fernandez | Spain | 13 Dec 2003 | - | Benicarló, Spain | |
| 50 m butterfly | S6 | 38.86 | | Anastasia Diodorova | Russia | 30 November 2009 | IPC World Championships | Rio de Janeiro, Brazil | |
| 50 m butterfly | S7 | 35.17 | | Mallory Weggemann | United States | 4 December 2009 | IPC World Championships | Rio de Janeiro, Brazil | |
| 50 m butterfly | S8 | 34.10 | | Jessica Long | United States | 5 Dec 2009 | IPC World Championships | Rio de Janeiro, Brazil | |
| 50 m butterfly | S9 | 31.63 | | Annabelle Williams | Australia | 29 November 2009 | IPC World Championships | Rio de Janeiro, Brazil | |
| 50 m butterfly | S10 | 28.42 | | Sophie Pascoe | New Zealand | 3 October 2017 | New Zealand Championships | Auckland, New Zealand | |
| 50 m butterfly | S11 | 32.91 | | Mary Fisher | New Zealand | 30 September 2013 | New Zealand Championships | Wellington, New Zealand | |
| 50 m butterfly | S12 | 30.23 | | Joanna Mendak | Poland | 1 December 2009 | IPC World Championships | Rio de Janeiro, Brazil | |
| 50 m butterfly | S13 | 30.67 | = | Rhiannon Henry | Great Britain | 1 December 2009 | IPC World Championships | Rio de Janeiro, Brazil | |
| 50 m butterfly | S13 | 30.67 | = | Prue Watt | Australia | 3 July 2011 | - | Adelaide, Australia | |

Legend: # – Record awaiting ratification by IPC; e – equalled existing record;
Records not set in finals: h – heat; sf – semifinal; r – relay 1st leg; rh – relay heat 1st leg; b – B final; † – en route to final mark; so – swim-off

== 100 m butterfly ==
| Event | Class | Time | | Name | Nation | Date | Meet | Location | Ref |
|---|---|---|---|---|---|---|---|---|---|
| 100 m butterfly | S5 | 1:49.32 | | Claire Warne | Great Britain | 15 Mar 2008 | - | Biggleswade, United Kingdom | |
| 100 m butterfly | S6 | 1:33.85 | | Sarah Kate Rose | Australia | 2 Sep 2007 | - | Melbourne, Australia | |
| 100 m butterfly | S7 | 1:20.92 | | Nikita Howarth | New Zealand | 5 September 2014 | New Zealand Championships | Wellington, New Zealand | |
| 100 m butterfly | S8 | 1:12.24 | | Jessica Long | United States | 3 Dec 2009 | IPC World Championships | Rio de Janeiro, Brazil | |
| 100 m butterfly | S9 | 1:12.43 | | Stéphanie Dixon | Canada | 25 Feb 2005 | - | Edmonton, Canada | |
| 100 m butterfly | S10 | 1:03.03 | h | Sophie Pascoe | New Zealand | 6 October 2017 | New Zealand Championships | Auckland, New Zealand | |
| 100 m butterfly | S11 | 1:15.82 | h | Mary Fisher | New Zealand | 5 September 2014 | New Zealand Championships | Wellington, New Zealand | |
| 100 m butterfly | S12 | 1:09.46 | | Joanna Mendak | Poland | 20 Mar 2005 | - | Tychy, Poland | |
| 100 m butterfly | S13 | 1:07.49 | | Marie Claire Ross | Canada | 8 Feb 1997 | - | Toronto, Canada | |
| 100 m butterfly | S14 | 1:06.91 | | Marlou van der Kulk | Netherlands | 30 October 2015 | Dutch Championships | Tilburg, Netherlands | |

Legend: # – Record awaiting ratification by IPC; e – equalled existing record;
Records not set in finals: h – heat; sf – semifinal; b – B final; † – en route to final mark; so – swim-off

== 200 m butterfly ==
| Event | Class | Time | Name | Nation | Date | Meet | Location | Ref |
|---|---|---|---|---|---|---|---|---|
| 200 m butterfly | S8 | 3:04.95 | Sharni Ross | Australia | 26 May 2007 | - | Sydney, Australia | |
| 200 m butterfly | S9 | | | - | | | | |
| 200 m butterfly | S10 | 2:37.52 | Eleni Papadopoulos | Great Britain | 4 November 2012 | British Universities and College Sports Competition | Sheffield, Great Britain | |
| 200 m butterfly | S11 | | | - | | | | |
| 200 m butterfly | S12 | 2:34.39 | Joanna Mendak | Poland | 22 Mar 2003 | - | Ptock, Poland | |
| 200 m butterfly | S13 | 2:30.67 | Teigan Anne van Roosmalen | Australia | 19 Jul 2008 | - | Melbourne, Australia | |

Legend: # – Record awaiting ratification by IPC; e – equalled existing record;
Records not set in finals: h – heat; sf – semifinal; b – B final; † – en route to final mark; so – swim-off

== 100 m individual medley ==
| Event | Class | Time | Name | Nation | Date | Meet | Location | Ref |
|---|---|---|---|---|---|---|---|---|
| 100 m individual medley | SM3 | 2:18.29 | Karen Breumso | Denmark | 26 Nov 2003 | - | Esbjerg, Denmark | |
| 100 m individual medley | SM4 | 1:56.46 | Margaret McEleny | Great Britain | 2 Nov 1996 | - | Darlington, United Kingdom | |
| 100 m individual medley | SM5 | 1:53.58 | Claire Warne | Great Britain | 11 Mar 2007 | - | Biggleswade, United Kingdom | |
| 100 m individual medley | SM6 | 1:34.43 | Nyree Lewis | Great Britain | 3 Nov 2007 | - | Sheffield, United Kingdom | |
| 100 m individual medley | SM7 | 1:30.04 | Kristin Hakonardottir | Iceland | 18 Nov 2001 | - | Stavanger, Norway | |
| 100 m individual medley | SM8 | 1:12.27 | Olesya Vladykina | Russia | 30 Nov 2009 | IPC World Championships | Rio de Janeiro, Brazil | |
| 100 m individual medley | SM9 | 1:11.74 | Natalie Du Toit | South Africa | 6 Aug 2010 | South African Championships | Pietermaritzburg, South Africa | |
| 100 m individual medley | SM10 | 1:05.01 | Sophie Pascoe | New Zealand | 5 October 2017 | New Zealand Championships | Auckland, New Zealand | |
| 100 m individual medley | SM11 | 1:18.40 | Mary Fisher | New Zealand | 4 September 2014 | New Zealand Championships | Wellington, New Zealand | |
| 100 m individual medley | SM12 | 1:20.81 | Jemma Houghton | Great Britain | 6 Nov 2004 | - | Sheffield, United Kingdom | |
| 100 m individual medley | SM13 | 1:15.16 | Rhiannon Henry | Great Britain | 6 Nov 2004 | - | Sheffield, United Kingdom | |

Legend: # – Record awaiting ratification by IPC; e – equalled existing record;
Records not set in finals: h – heat; sf – semifinal; b – B final; † – en route to final mark; so – swim-off

== 150 m individual medley ==
| Event | Class | Time | Name | Nation | Date | Meet | Location | Ref |
|---|---|---|---|---|---|---|---|---|
| 150 m individual medley | SM1 | | | - | | | | |
| 150 m individual medley | SM2 | | | - | | | | |
| 150 m individual medley | SM3 | | | - | | | | |
| 150 m individual medley | SM4 | | | - | | | | |

Legend: # – Record awaiting ratification by IPC; e – equalled existing record;
Records not set in finals: h – heat; sf – semifinal; b – B final; † – en route to final mark; so – swim-off

== 200 m individual medley ==
| Event | Class | Time | Name | Nation | Date | Meet | Location | Ref |
|---|---|---|---|---|---|---|---|---|
| 200 m individual medley | SM3 | 4:53.22 | Karen Breumso | Denmark | 21 Mar 2003 | - | Esbjerg, Denmark | |
| 200 m individual medley | SM5 | 3:47.43 | Jenny Newstead | New Zealand | 16 Jun 1996 | - | Dunedin, New Zealand | |
| 200 m individual medley | SM6 | 3:18.63 | Natalie Jones | Great Britain | 3 Nov 2007 | - | Sheffield, United Kingdom | |
| 200 m individual medley | SM7 | 3:10.40 | Elisabeth Walker | Canada | 2 Feb 2002 | - | Sudbury, ON, Canada | |
| 200 m individual medley | SM8 | 2:35.83 | Olesya Vladykina | Russia | 5 Dec 2009 | IPC World Championships | Rio de Janeiro, Brazil | |
| 200 m individual medley | SM9 | 2:38.17 | Stéphanie Dixon | Canada | 20 Feb 2004 | - | Vancouver, Canada | |
| 200 m individual medley | SM10 | 2:21.45 | Sophie Pascoe | New Zealand | 4 October 2017 | New Zealand Championships | Auckland, New Zealand | |
| 200 m individual medley | SM11 | 2:59.96 | Daniela Schulte | Germany | 15 Nov 2008 | - | Chemnitz, Germany | |
| 200 m individual medley | SM12 | 2:39.93 | Ana Garcia-Arcicollar | Spain | 15 Dec 2007 | - | Benicarló, Spain | |
| 200 m individual medley | SM13 | 2:28.13 | Kirby Cote | Canada | 20 Feb 2004 | - | Vancouver, Canada | |

Legend: # – Record awaiting ratification by IPC; e – equalled existing record;
Records not set in finals: h – heat; sf – semifinal; b – B final; † – en route to final mark; so – swim-off

== 400 m individual medley ==
| Event | Class | Time | Name | Nation | Date | Meet | Location | Ref |
|---|---|---|---|---|---|---|---|---|
| 400 m individual medley | SM8 | 6:10.57 | Emma Hollis | Great Britain | 12 Nov 2011 | - | Sheffield, United Kingdom | |
| 400 m individual medley | SM9 | 5:32.38 | Stéphanie Dixon | Canada | 5 Mar 2004 | - | Toronto, Canada | |
| 400 m individual medley | SM10 | 5:34.17 | Sarah Bailey | Great Britain | 11 Apr 1993 | - | Portsmouth, United Kingdom | |
| 400 m individual medley | SM11 | 7:07.82 | Chantal Cavin | Switzerland | 23 May 2005 | - | Bern, Switzerland | |
| 400 m individual medley | SM12 | | | - | | | | |
| 400 m individual medley | SM13 | 5:21.88 | Valérie Grand'Maison | Canada | 26 Apr 2008 | - | Montreal, Canada | |

Legend: # – Record awaiting ratification by IPC; e – equalled existing record;
Records not set in finals: h – heat; sf – semifinal; b – B final; † – en route to final mark; so – swim-off

== See also ==
- List of IPC world records in swimming – Men's long course
- List of IPC world records in swimming – Women's long course
- List of IPC world records in swimming – Men's short course
