= Swimming at the 2004 Summer Paralympics – Women's 100 metre freestyle S11 =

Women's 100m Freestyle S11 at the XII Paralympic Games
- Paralympic Swimming
- Venue: Olympic Aquatic Centre
- Dates: 24 September 2004
- Competitors: 11 from 10 nations
- Winning time: 1:12.10

Medalists
1st place, gold medalist(s)		Natalie Ball	Germany
2nd place, silver medalist(s)		Jessica Tuomela	Canada
3rd place, bronze medalist(s)		Marion Nijhof	Netherlands

The Women's 100 metre freestyle S11 swimming event at the 2004 Summer Paralympics was competed on 24 September. It was won by Natalie Ball, representing Germany.

== 1st round ==
Qualified for final round

Heat 1

24 Sept. 2004, morning session

Rank	Athlete	Time	Notes
1	Marion Nijhof (NED)	1:13.61	
2	Chantal Cavin (SUI)	1:15.17	
3	Fabiana Sugimori (BRA)	1:20.24	
4	Dong Qiming (CHN)	1:21.67	
5	Anessa Kemna (USA)	1:22.89	

Heat 2

24 Sept. 2004, morning session

Rank	Athlete	Time	Notes
1	Anais Garcia (ESP)	1:12.53	
2	Natalie Ball (GER)	1:15.53	
3	Jessica Tuomela (CAN)	1:18.27	
4	Elaine Barrett (GBR)	1:20.12	
5	Rina Akiyama (JPN)	1:23.84	
6	Ashley Nashleanas (USA)	1:30.89	

== Final round ==
24 Sept. 2004, evening session

Rank	Athlete	Time	Notes
1st place, gold medalist(s)	Natalie Ball (GER)	1:12.10	
2nd place, silver medalist(s)	Jessica Tuomela (CAN)	1:13.25	
3rd place, bronze medalist(s)	Marion Nijhof (NED)	1:13.48	
4	Fabiana Sugimori (BRA)	1:14.43	
5	Chantal Cavin (SUI)	1:14.97	
6	Jessica Tuomela (CAN)	1:15.43	
7	Elaine Barrett (GBR)	1:18.37	
8	Dong Qiming (CHN)	1:20.10	
