= Swimming at the 2004 Summer Paralympics – Women's 100 metre breaststroke SB11 =

Women's 100m Breaststroke SB11 at the XII Paralympic Games
- Paralympic Swimming
- Venue: Olympic Aquatic Centre
- Dates: 20 September 2004
- Competitors: 10 from 10 nations
- Winning time: 1:32.31

Medalists
1st place, gold medalist(s)		Elaine Barrett	Great Britain
2nd place, silver medalist(s)		Natalie Ball	Germany
3rd place, bronze medalist(s)		Olga Sokolova	Russia

The Women's 100 metre breaststroke SB11 swimming event at the 2004 Summer Paralympics was competed on 20 September. It was won by Elaine Barrett, representing Great Britain.

== 1st round ==
Qualified for final round

Heat 1

20 Sept. 2004, morning session

Rank	Athlete	Time	Notes
1	Natalie Ball (GER)	1:34.23	
2	Anessa Kemna (USA)	1:46.38	
3	Rina Akiyama (JPN)	1:47.00	
4	Anais Garcia (ESP)	1:47.16	
	Jessica Tuomela (CAN)	DSQ	

Heat 2

20 Sept. 2004, morning session

Rank	Athlete	Time	Notes
1	Elaine Barrett (GBR)	1:31.96	
2	Olga Sokolova (RUS)	1:38.09	
3	Chantal Cavin (SUI)	1:42.38	
4	Fabiana Sugimori (BRA)	1:43.21	
	Thi Hao Nguyen (VIE)	DNS	

== Final round ==
20 Sept. 2004, evening session

Rank	Athlete	Time	Notes
1st place, gold medalist(s)	Elaine Barrett (GBR)	1:32.31	
2nd place, silver medalist(s)	Natalie Ball (GER)	1:32.98	
3rd place, bronze medalist(s)	Olga Sokolova (RUS)	1:38.23	
4	Chantal Cavin (SUI)	1:42.72	
5	Fabiana Sugimori (BRA)	1:42.96	
6	Anessa Kemna (USA)	1:44.40	
7	Anais Garcia (ESP)	1:46.89	
8	Rina Akiyama (JPN)	1:46.99	
