= Swimming at the 2004 Summer Paralympics – Women's 200 metre individual medley SM11 =

Women's 200m Individual Medley SM11 at the XII Paralympic Games
- Paralympic Swimming
- Venue: Olympic Aquatic Centre
- Dates: 22 September 2004
- Competitors: 7 from 7 nations
- Winning time: 3:04.24

Medalists
| 1st place, gold medalist(s) | | Olga Sokolova | Russia |
| 2nd place, silver medalist(s) | | Marion Nijhof | Netherlands |
| 3rd place, bronze medalist(s) | | Natalie Ball | Germany |

The Women's 200 metre individual medley SM11 swimming event at the 2004 Summer Paralympics was competed on 22 September. It was won by Olga Sokolova, representing Russia.

== Final round ==
22 Sept. 2004, evening session

| Rank | Athlete | Time | Notes |
|---|---|---|---|
| 1st place, gold medalist(s) | Olga Sokolova (RUS) | 3:04.24 | |
| 2nd place, silver medalist(s) | Marion Nijhof (NED) | 3:10.32 | |
| 3rd place, bronze medalist(s) | Natalie Ball (GER) | 3:13.15 | |
| 4 | Fabiana Sugimori (BRA) | 3:14.10 | |
| 5 | Anessa Kemna (USA) | 3:23.10 | |
| 6 | Rina Akiyama (JPN) | 3:26.92 | |
| | Elaine Barrett (GBR) | DSQ | |
