= Swimming at the 2004 Summer Paralympics – Women's 50 metre freestyle S11 =

Women's 50m Freestyle S11 at the XII Paralympic Games
- Paralympic Swimming
- Venue: Olympic Aquatic Centre
- Dates: 26 September 2004
- Competitors: 13 from 11 nations
- Winning time: 32.35

Medalists
1st place, gold medalist(s)		Fabiana Sugimori	Brazil
2nd place, silver medalist(s)		Natalie Ball	Germany
3rd place, bronze medalist(s)		Marion Nijhof	Netherlands

The Women's 50 metre freestyle S11 swimming event at the 2004 Summer Paralympics was competed on 26 September. It was won by Fabiana Sugimori, representing Brazil.

== 1st round ==
Qualified for final round

Heat 1

26 Sept. 2004, morning session

Rank	Athlete	Time	Notes
1	Fabiana Sugimori (BRA)	32.32	WR
2	Olga Sokolova (RUS)	34.91	
3	Dong Qiming (CHN)	35.15	
4	Jessica Tuomela (CAN)	35.50	
5	Zhang Yuan (CHN)	36.62	
6	Anessa Kemna (USA)	39.12	

Heat 2

26 Sept. 2004, morning session

Rank	Athlete	Time	Notes
1	Natalie Ball (GER)	33.84	
2	Marion Nijhof (NED)	34.08	
3	Anais Garcia (ESP)	34.29	
4	Chantal Cavin (SUI)	35.15	
5	Elaine Barrett (GBR)	36.55	
6	Rina Akiyama (JPN)	36.77	
7	Ashley Nashleanas (USA)	42.15	

== Final round ==
26 Sept. 2004, evening session

Rank	Athlete	Time	Notes
1st place, gold medalist(s)	Fabiana Sugimori (BRA)	32.35	
2nd place, silver medalist(s)	Natalie Ball (GER)	33.22	
3rd place, bronze medalist(s)	Marion Nijhof (NED)	33.58	
4	Jessica Tuomela (CAN)	33.68	
5	Anais Garcia (ESP)	33.71	
6	Chantal Cavin (SUI)	33.92	
7	Olga Sokolova (RUS)	34.72	
8	Dong Qiming (CHN)	35.72	
