= Swimming at the 2008 Summer Paralympics – Women's 100 metre butterfly S13 =

Women's 100m Butterfly S13 at the XIII Paralympic Games
- Venue: Beijing National Aquatics Center
- Dates: 7 September
- Competitors: 9 from 5 nations
- Winning time: 1:06.49

Medalists
| 1st place, gold medalist(s) | | Valerie Grand Maison | Canada |
| 2nd place, silver medalist(s) | | Kirby Cote | Canada |
| 3rd place, bronze medalist(s) | | Chelsey Gotell | Canada |

The women's 100m butterfly S13 event at the 2008 Summer Paralympics took place at the Beijing National Aquatics Center on 7 September. There were two heats; the swimmers with the eight fastest times advanced to the final.

== Results ==
=== Heats ===
Competed from 09:21.

==== Heat 1 ====
| Rank | Name | Nationality | Time | Notes |
|---|---|---|---|---|
| 1 | Valerie Grand Maison | Canada | 1:07.63 | Q |
| 2 | Chelsey Gotell | Canada | 1:07.91 | Q |
| 3 | Teigan van Roosmalen | Australia | 1:10.57 | Q |
| 4 | Jenny Coughlin | Great Britain | 1:11.94 | Q |

==== Heat 2 ====
| Rank | Name | Nationality | Time | Notes |
|---|---|---|---|---|
| 1 | Kirby Cote | Canada | 1:07.21 | Q |
| 2 | Prue Watt | Australia | 1:08.21 | Q |
| 3 | Kelley Becherer | United States | 1:08.91 | Q |
| 4 | Rhiannon Henry | Great Britain | 1:10.39 | Q |
| 5 | Akari Kasamoto | Japan | 1:27.63 | |

=== Final ===
Competed at 17:14.

| Rank | Name | Nationality | Time | Notes |
|---|---|---|---|---|
| 1st place, gold medalist(s) | Valerie Grand Maison | Canada | 1:06.49 | |
| 2nd place, silver medalist(s) | Kirby Cote | Canada | 1:06.62 | |
| 3rd place, bronze medalist(s) | Chelsey Gotell | Canada | 1:06.93 | |
| 4 | Prue Watt | Australia | 1:07.48 | |
| 5 | Rhiannon Henry | Great Britain | 1:07.51 | |
| 6 | Kelley Becherer | United States | 1:08.38 | |
| 7 | Teigan van Roosmalen | Australia | 1:09.48 | |
| 8 | Jenny Coughlin | Great Britain | 1:12.99 | |

Q = qualified for final.
