= Swimming at the 2008 Summer Paralympics – Women's 400 metre freestyle S13 =

Women's 400m Freestyle S13 at the XIII Paralympic Games
- Venue: Beijing National Aquatics Center
- Dates: 8 September
- Competitors: 9 from 6 nations
- Winning time: 4:28.64

Medalists
1st place, gold medalist(s)		Valerie Grand Maison	Canada
2nd place, silver medalist(s)		Anna Efimenko	Russia
3rd place, bronze medalist(s)		Kelley Becherer	United States
3rd place, bronze medalist(s)		Chelsey Gotell	Canada

The women's 400m freestyle S13 event at the 2008 Summer Paralympics took place at the Beijing National Aquatics Center on 8 September. There were two heats; the swimmers with the eight fastest times advanced to the final. The final produced a dead heat for third place and two bronze medals were awarded. The silver medal was won by Anna Efimenko of Russia, a more impaired S12 competitor. The gold medal was won by Valerie Grand Maison who set a world-record of 4:28.64 in the final.

== Results ==
=== Heats ===
Competed from 09:47.

==== Heat 1 ====
Rank	Name	Nationality	Time	Notes
1	Kelley Becherer	United States	4:42.18	Q
2	Anna Efimenko	Russia	4:46.25	Q
3	Prue Watt	Australia	4:49.80	Q
4	Jenny Coughlin	Great Britain	4:58.01	Q

==== Heat 2 ====
Rank	Name	Nationality	Time	Notes
1	Valerie Grand Maison	Canada	4:36.16	Q, PR
2	Chelsey Gotell	Canada	4:44.05	Q
3	Rhiannon Henry	Great Britain	4:53.98	Q
4	Teigan van Roosmalen	Australia	4:58.20	Q
5	Lidia Marta Banos	Spain	5:00.03	

=== Final ===
Competed at 17:45.

Rank	Name	Nationality	Time	Notes
1st place, gold medalist(s)	Valerie Grand Maison	Canada	4:28.64	WR
2nd place, silver medalist(s)	Anna Efimenko	Russia	4:37.37	
3rd place, bronze medalist(s)	Kelley Becherer	United States	4:37.50	
3rd place, bronze medalist(s)	Chelsey Gotell	Canada	4:37.50	
5	Rhiannon Henry	Great Britain	4:41.50	
6	Prue Watt	Australia	4:46.21	
7	Jenny Coughlin	Great Britain	4:56.85	
8	Teigan van Roosmalen	Australia	5:02.17	

Q = qualified for final. WR = World Record. PR = Paralympic Record.
