= Swimming at the 2008 Summer Paralympics – Women's 100 metre freestyle S11 =

Women's 100m Freestyle S11 at the XIII Paralympic Games
- Venue: Beijing National Aquatics Center
- Dates: 12 September
- Competitors: 12 from 9 nations
- Winning time: 1:08.96

Medalists
1st place, gold medalist(s)		Xie Qing	China
2nd place, silver medalist(s)		Cecilia Camellini	Italy
3rd place, bronze medalist(s)		Daniela Schulte	Germany

The women's 100m freestyle S11 event at the 2008 Summer Paralympics took place at the Beijing National Aquatics Center on 12 September. There were two heats; the swimmers with the eight fastest times advanced to the final.

== Results ==
=== Heats ===
Competed from 09:39.

==== Heat 1 ====
Rank	Name	Nationality	Time	Notes
1	Cecilia Camellini	Italy	1:12.74	Q
2	Maria Poiani Panigati	Italy	1:13.22	Q
3	Amber Thomas	Canada	1:13.85	Q
4	Fabiana Sugimori	Brazil	1:15.24	Q
5	Nadia Baez	Argentina	1:20.48	
6	Rina Akiyama	Japan	1:20.57	

==== Heat 2 ====
Rank	Name	Nationality	Time	Notes
1	Xie Qing	China	1:10.36	Q, WR
2	Daniela Schulte	Germany	1:11.57	Q
3	Chantal Cavin	Switzerland	1:12.09	Q
4	Jessica Tuomela	Canada	1:14.89	Q
5	Naomi Ikinaga	Japan	1:16.64	
6	Olga Sokolova (swimmer)	Russia	1:19.17	

=== Final ===
Competed at 17:27.

Rank	Name	Nationality	Time	Notes
1st place, gold medalist(s)	Xie Qing	China	1:08.96	WR
2nd place, silver medalist(s)	Cecilia Camellini	Italy	1:09.65	
3rd place, bronze medalist(s)	Daniela Schulte	Germany	1:11.08	
4	Chantal Cavin	Switzerland	1:12.16	
5	Maria Poiani Panigati	Italy	1:12.71	
6	Fabiana Sugimori	Brazil	1:13.40	
7	Amber Thomas	Canada	1:14.39	
8	Jessica Tuomela	Canada	1:14.79	

Q = qualified for final. WR = World Record.
