= Swimming at the 2004 Summer Paralympics – Women's 50 metre freestyle S13 =

Women's 50m Freestyle S13 at the XII Paralympic Games
- Paralympic Swimming
- Venue: Olympic Aquatic Centre
- Dates: 27 September 2004
- Competitors: 10 from 5 nations
- Winning time: 28.47

Medalists
1st place, gold medalist(s)		Kirby Cote	Canada
2nd place, silver medalist(s)		Prue Watt	Australia
3rd place, bronze medalist(s)		Chelsey Gotell	Canada

The Women's 50 metre freestyle S13 swimming event at the 2004 Summer Paralympics was competed on 27 September. It was won by Kirby Cote, representing Canada.

== 1st round ==
Qualified for final round

Heat 1

27 Sept. 2004, morning session

Rank	Athlete	Time	Notes
1	Kirby Cote (CAN)	29.11	
2	Prue Watt (AUS)	29.45	
3	Tiffanie Wright (USA)	29.75	
4	Carrie Willoughby (USA)	30.03	
5	Rhea Schmidt (CAN)	30.66	

Heat 2

27 Sept. 2004, morning session

Rank	Athlete	Time	Notes
1	Chelsey Gotell (CAN)	29.56	
2	Jennifer Butcher (USA)	29.94	
3	Karolina Pelendritou (CYP)	30.33	
4	Rhiannon Henry (GBR)	30.37	
5	Jenny Coughlin (GBR)	31.39	

== Final round ==
27 Sept. 2004, evening session

Rank	Athlete	Time	Notes
1st place, gold medalist(s)	Kirby Cote (CAN)	28.47	
2nd place, silver medalist(s)	Prue Watt (AUS)	28.89	
3rd place, bronze medalist(s)	Chelsey Gotell (CAN)	29.00	
4	Tiffanie Wright (USA)	29.14	
5	Jennifer Butcher (USA)	29.70	
6	Rhiannon Henry (GBR)	29.74	
7	Carrie Willoughby (USA)	29.96	
8	Karolina Pelendritou (CYP)	30.29	
