= Swimming at the 2004 Summer Paralympics – Women's 200 metre individual medley SM13 =

Women's 200m Individual Medley SM13 at the XII Paralympic Games
- Paralympic Swimming
- Venue: Olympic Aquatic Centre
- Dates: 24 September 2004
- Competitors: 7 from 4 nations
- Winning time: 2:31.20

Medalists
| 1st place, gold medalist(s) | | Kirby Cote | Canada |
| 2nd place, silver medalist(s) | | Prue Watt | Australia |
| 3rd place, bronze medalist(s) | | Chelsey Gotell | Canada |

The Women's 200 metre individual medley SM13 swimming event at the 2004 Summer Paralympics was competed on 24 September. It was won by Kirby Cote, representing Canada.

== Final round ==
24 Sept. 2004, evening session

| Rank | Athlete | Time | Notes |
|---|---|---|---|
| 1st place, gold medalist(s) | Kirby Cote (CAN) | 2:31.20 | |
| 2nd place, silver medalist(s) | Prue Watt (AUS) | 2:34.93 | |
| 3rd place, bronze medalist(s) | Chelsey Gotell (CAN) | 2:34.97 | |
| 4 | Rhiannon Henry (GBR) | 2:37.29 | |
| 5 | Rhea Schmidt (CAN) | 2:42.62 | |
| 6 | Kelley Becherer (USA) | 2:50.07 | |
| 7 | Tiffanie Wright (USA) | 2:57.61 | |
