= Swimming at the 2008 Summer Paralympics – Women's 200 metre individual medley SM13 =

Event at 2008 Summer Para Olympics

Women's 200m Individual Medley SM13 at the XIII Paralympic Games
- Venue: Beijing National Aquatics Center
- Dates: 12 September
- Competitors: 8 from 5 nations
- Winning time: 2:28.15

Medalists
1st place, gold medalist(s)		Chelsey Gotell	Canada
2nd place, silver medalist(s)		Kirby Cote	Canada
3rd place, bronze medalist(s)		Valerie Grand Maison	Canada

The women's 200m individual medley SM13 event at the 2008 Summer Paralympics took place at the Beijing National Aquatics Center on 12 September. There were no heats in this event.

== Final ==
Competed at 19:45.

Rank	Name	Nationality	Time	Notes
1st place, gold medalist(s)	Chelsey Gotell	Canada	2:28.15	WR
2nd place, silver medalist(s)	Kirby Cote	Canada	2:28.65	
3rd place, bronze medalist(s)	Valerie Grand Maison	Canada	2:29.29	
4	Kelley Becherer	United States	2:32.21	
5	Prue Watt	Australia	2:32.87	
6	Teigan van Roosmalen	Australia	2:39.20	
7	Lidia Marta Banos	Spain	2:48.80	
8	Akari Kasamoto	Japan	2:55.16	

WR = World Record.
