= Swimming at the 2004 Summer Paralympics – Women's 100 metre backstroke S13 =

Women's 100m Backstroke S13 at the XII Paralympic Games
- Paralympic Swimming
- Venue: Olympic Aquatic Centre
- Dates: 26 September 2004
- Competitors: 9 from 4 nations
- Winning time: 1:12.71

Medalists
1st place, gold medalist(s)		Chelsey Gotell	Canada
2nd place, silver medalist(s)		Kirby Cote	Canada
3rd place, bronze medalist(s)		Jennifer Butcher	United States

The Women's 100 metre backstroke S13 swimming event at the 2004 Summer Paralympics was competed on 26 September. It was won by Chelsey Gotell, representing Canada.

== 1st round ==
Qualified for final round

Heat 1

26 Sept. 2004, morning session

Rank	Athlete	Time	Notes
1	Kirby Cote (CAN)	1:15.65	
2	Jennifer Butcher (USA)	1:16.51	
3	Rhea Schmidt (CAN)	1:19.89	
	Karolina Pelendritou (CYP)	DSQ	

Heat 2

26 Sept. 2004, morning session

Rank	Athlete	Time	Notes
1	Chelsey Gotell (CAN)	1:14.53	
2	Carrie Willoughby (USA)	1:16.12	
3	Jenny Coughlin (GBR)	1:18.80	
4	Kelley Becherer (USA)	1:19.97	
5	Rhiannon Henry (GBR)	1:20.48	

== Final round ==
26 Sept. 2004, evening session

Rank	Athlete	Time	Notes
1st place, gold medalist(s)	Chelsey Gotell (CAN)	1:12.71	
2nd place, silver medalist(s)	Kirby Cote (CAN)	1:14.08	
3rd place, bronze medalist(s)	Jennifer Butcher (USA)	1:15.75	
4	Carrie Willoughby (USA)	1:15.94	
5	Rhea Schmidt (CAN)	1:17.51	
6	Rhiannon Henry (GBR)	1:18.03	
7	Jenny Coughlin (GBR)	1:18.79	
8	Kelley Becherer (USA)	1:18.86	
