= Swimming at the 2004 Summer Paralympics – Women's 400 metre freestyle S13 =

Women's 400m Freestyle S13 at the XII Paralympic Games
- Paralympic Swimming
- Venue: Olympic Aquatic Centre
- Dates: 20 September 2004
- Competitors: 8 from 4 nations
- Winning time: 4:43.23

Medalists
1st place, gold medalist(s)		Kirby Cote	Canada
2nd place, silver medalist(s)		Prue Watt	Australia
3rd place, bronze medalist(s)		Rhiannon Henry	Great Britain

The Women's 400 metre freestyle S13 swimming event at the 2004 Summer Paralympics was competed on 20 September. It was won by Kirby Cote, representing Canada.

== Final round ==
20 Sept. 2004, evening session

Rank	Athlete	Time	Notes
1st place, gold medalist(s)	Kirby Cote (CAN)	4:43.23	
2nd place, silver medalist(s)	Prue Watt (AUS)	4:49.51	
3rd place, bronze medalist(s)	Rhiannon Henry (GBR)	4:49.66	
4	Chelsey Gotell (CAN)	4:58.63	
5	Kelley Becherer (USA)	5:01.96	
6	Tiffanie Wright (USA)	5:03.29	
7	Jenny Coughlin (GBR)	5:03.31	
8	Carrie Willoughby (USA)	5:08.12	
