= Swimming at the 2004 Summer Paralympics – Women's 100 metre backstroke S11 =

Women's 100m Backstroke S11 at the XII Paralympic Games
- Paralympic Swimming
- Venue: Olympic Aquatic Centre
- Dates: 25 September 2004
- Competitors: 9 from 7 nations
- Winning time: 1:22.35

Medalists
1st place, gold medalist(s)		Dong Qiming	China
2nd place, silver medalist(s)		Rina Akiyama	Japan
3rd place, bronze medalist(s)		Olga Sokolova	Russia

The Women's 100 metre backstroke S11 swimming event at the 2004 Summer Paralympics was competed on 25 September. It was won by Dong Qiming, representing China.

== 1st round ==
Qualified for final round

Heat 1

25 Sept. 2004, morning session

Rank	Athlete	Time	Notes
1	Marion Nijhof (NED)	1:27.48	
2	Rina Akiyama (JPN)	1:28.10	
3	Zhang Yuan (CHN)	1:30.20	
4	Ashley Nashleanas (USA)	1:37.87	

Heat 2

25 Sept. 2004, morning session

Rank	Athlete	Time	Notes
1	Dong Qiming (CHN)	1:23.37	
2	Olga Sokolova (RUS)	1:25.45	
3	Natalie Ball (GER)	1:26.49	
4	Jessica Tuomela (CAN)	1:33.64	
5	Anessa Kemna (USA)	1:37.00	

== Final round ==
25 Sept. 2004, evening session

Rank	Athlete	Time	Notes
1st place, gold medalist(s)	Dong Qiming (CHN)	1:22.35	WR
2nd place, silver medalist(s)	Rina Akiyama (JPN)	1:23.63	
3rd place, bronze medalist(s)	Olga Sokolova (RUS)	1:23.68	
4	Natalie Ball (GER)	1:25.34	
5	Marion Nijhof (NED)	1:26.17	
6	Jessica Tuomela (CAN)	1:28.55	
7	Zhang Yuan (CHN)	1:30.22	
8	Anessa Kemna (USA)	1:39.09	
