= Swimming at the 2004 Summer Paralympics – Women's 100 metre breaststroke SB13 =

Women's 100m Breaststroke SB13 at the XII Paralympic Games
- Paralympic Swimming
- Venue: Olympic Aquatic Centre
- Dates: 25 September 2004
- Competitors: 6 from 4 nations
- Winning time: 1:17.32

Medalists
1st place, gold medalist(s)		Karolina Pelendritou	Cyprus
2nd place, silver medalist(s)		Kirby Cote	Canada
3rd place, bronze medalist(s)		Prue Watt	Australia

The Women's 100 metre breaststroke SB13 swimming event at the 2004 Summer Paralympics was competed on 25 September. It was won by Karolina Pelendritou, representing Cyprus.

== Final round ==
25 Sept. 2004, evening session

Rank	Athlete	Time	Notes
1st place, gold medalist(s)	Karolina Pelendritou (CYP)	1:17.32	PR
2nd place, silver medalist(s)	Kirby Cote (CAN)	1:17.34	
3rd place, bronze medalist(s)	Prue Watt (AUS)	1:23.07	
4	Chelsey Gotell (CAN)	1:25.84	
5	Rhea Schmidt (CAN)	1:26.53	
6	Kelley Becherer (USA)	1:29.70	
