= Swimming at the 2008 Summer Paralympics – Women's 50 metre freestyle S11 =

Women's 50m Freestyle S11 at the XIII Paralympic Games
- Venue: Beijing National Aquatics Center
- Dates: 14 September
- Competitors: 12 from 9 nations
- Winning time: 31.39

Medalists
1st place, gold medalist(s)		Maria Poiani Panigati	Italy
2nd place, silver medalist(s)		Cecilia Camellini	Italy
3rd place, bronze medalist(s)		Fabiana Sugimori	Brazil

The women's 50m freestyle S11 event at the 2008 Summer Paralympics took place at the Beijing National Aquatics Center on 14 September. There were two heats; the swimmers with the eight fastest times advanced to the final.

== Results ==
=== Heats ===
Competed from 09:07.

==== Heat 1 ====
Rank	Name	Nationality	Time	Notes
1	Maria Poiani Panigati	Italy	31.21	Q, WR
2	Fabiana Sugimori	Brazil	32.90	Q
3	Naomi Ikinaga	Japan	33.38	Q
4	Rina Akiyama	Japan	33.77	Q
5	Daniela Schulte	Germany	33.83	Q
6	Amber Thomas	Canada	35.13	

==== Heat 2 ====
Rank	Name	Nationality	Time	Notes
1	Xie Qing	China	32.19	Q
2	Cecilia Camellini	Italy	33.08	Q
3	Chantal Cavin	Switzerland	33.29	Q
4	Jessica Tuomela	Canada	34.06	
5	Olga Sokolova (swimmer)	Russia	34.17	
6	Nadia Báez	Argentina	34.47	

=== Final ===
Competed at 17:05.

Rank	Name	Nationality	Time	Notes
1st place, gold medalist(s)	Maria Poiani Panigati	Italy	31.39	
2nd place, silver medalist(s)	Cecilia Camellini	Italy	31.95	
3rd place, bronze medalist(s)	Fabiana Sugimori	Brazil	32.45	
4	Chantal Cavin	Switzerland	32.58	
5	Naomi Ikinaga	Japan	32.81	
6	Daniela Schulte	Germany	33.05	
7	Xie Qing	China	33.06	
8	Rina Akiyama	Japan	33.88	

Q = qualified for final. WR = World Record.
