= 2007 IBSA World Games =

The 2007 IBSA World Games was held from 28 July to 8 August in São Paulo, Brazil.

== Sports ==
The sports were powerlifting, judo, goalball, football, swimming, and athletics.

== Medal table ==
Rank	Nation	Gold	Silver	Bronze	Total
1	Russia (RUS)	28	15	11	54
2	Belarus (BLR)	18	13	7	38
3	Brazil (BRA)	17	22	19	58
4	Spain (ESP)	16	23	23	62
5	China (CHN)	12	7	12	31
6	Cuba (CUB)	10	4	5	19
7	Iran (IRI)	8	1	4	13
8	Poland (POL)	7	2	2	11
9	Algeria (ALG)	7	1	9	17
10	Italy (ITA)	6	4	4	14
11	Germany (GER)	5	7	9	21
12	Greece (GRE)	5	5	2	12
13	Malaysia (MAS)	4	1	1	6
14	Ukraine (UKR)	3	7	3	13
15	Turkey (TUR)	3	0	2	5
16	Venezuela (VEN)	2	6	8	16
17	Portugal (POR)	2	4	2	8
18	Great Britain (GBR)	2	4	1	7
19	New Zealand (NZL)	2	2	0	4
19	Sweden (SWE)	2	2	0	4
21	Azerbaijan (AZE)	2	0	5	7
22	Canada (CAN)	2	0	0	2
22	Cyprus (CYP)	2	0	0	2
24	Angola (ANG)	1	3	1	5
25	Japan (JPN)	1	2	4	7
26	Chinese Taipei (TPE)	1	1	2	4
26	France (FRA)	1	1	2	4
28	Bulgaria (BUL)	1	1	1	3
28	Thailand (THA)	1	1	1	3
28	Tunisia (TUN)	1	1	1	3
31	Austria (AUT)	1	0	1	2
31	Croatia (CRO)	1	0	1	2
33	South Korea (KOR)	1	0	0	1
34	Argentina (ARG)	0	3	3	6
35	Mexico (MEX)	0	3	2	5
36	Australia (AUS)	0	2	1	3
36	Kenya (KEN)	0	2	1	3
38	Czech Republic (CZE)	0	2	0	2
38	United States (USA)	0	2	0	2
40	Finland (FIN)	0	1	1	2
41	Ireland (IRL)	0	1	0	1
41	South Africa (RSA)	0	1	0	1
43	Serbia (SRB)	0	0	2	2
44	Netherlands (NED)	0	0	1	1
44	Switzerland (SUI)	0	0	1	1
46	Belgium (BEL)	0	0	0	0
46	Colombia (COL)	0	0	0	0
46	Estonia (EST)	0	0	0	0
46	Hong Kong (HKG)	0	0	0	0
46	Hungary (HUN)	0	0	0	0
46	India (IND)	0	0	0	0
46	Iraq (IRQ)	0	0	0	0
46	Israel (ISR)	0	0	0	0
46	Kazakhstan (KAZ)	0	0	0	0
46	Latvia (LAT)	0	0	0	0
46	Lithuania (LTU)	0	0	0	0
46	Mongolia (MGL)	0	0	0	0
46	Philippines (PHI)	0	0	0	0
46	Puerto Rico (PUR)	0	0	0	0
46	Slovakia (SVK)	0	0	0	0
46	Uruguay (URU)	0	0	0	0
Totals (61 entries)		175	157	155	487
