= Marion Nijhof =

Dutch Paralympic swimmer (born 1981)

Personal information
- Born: September 20, 1981 (age 44) Utrecht, Netherlands

Sport
- Country: Netherlands
- Sport: Paralympic swimming
- Disability class: S11
Medal record
Representing Netherlands
Paralympic swimming
Paralympic Games
Silver medal – second place	2004 Athens	200m individual medley SM11
Bronze medal – third place	2000 Sydney	400m freestyle S11
Bronze medal – third place	2004 Athens	50m freestyle S11
Bronze medal – third place	2004 Athens	100m freestyle S11
World Championships
Gold medal – first place	2006 Durban	400m freestyle S11
Silver medal – second place	2006 Durban	100m freestyle S11
Silver medal – second place	2006 Durban	200m individual medley SM11
Bronze medal – third place	1994 Malta	50m freestyle S11
Bronze medal – third place	1994 Malta	100m freestyle S11
Bronze medal – third place	2006 Durban	50m freestyle S11

Marion Nijhof (born September 20, 1981) is a visually impaired Dutch Paralympic swimmer competing in S11-classification swimming events. She represented the Netherlands at the 2000 Summer Paralympics and at the 2004 Summer Paralympics. In total she won one silver medal and three bronze medals at the Summer Paralympics.

At the 2000 Summer Paralympics in Sydney, Australia, she won the bronze medal in the women's 400 metre freestyle S11 event.

Four years later, at the 2004 Summer Paralympics in Athens, Greece, she won three medals. In the women's 200 metre individual medley SM11 event she won the silver medal and she also won the bronze medals in the women's 50 metre freestyle S11 and women's 100 metre freestyle S11 events.

In 2007, she won the Disabled Sportswoman of the Year award, an annual award organised by the Dutch Olympic Committee. She was also knighted in the Order of Orange Nassau in the same year.
