= Natalie Örnkvist =

German-Finnish Paralympic goalball player and swimmer (born 1979)

Personal information
- Other names: Natalie Ball
- Citizenship: Finland; United Kingdom
- Born: 13 February 1979 (age 47) Nottingham, England

Sport
- Sport: Goalball; para swimming
- Disability class: S11; S5
Medal record
Women's para swimming
Representing Germany
Paralympic Games
Silver medal – second place	2004 Athens	Women's 50m freestyle S11
Silver medal – second place	2004 Athens	100 m freestyle S11
Silver medal – second place	2004 Athens	Women's 100m breaststroke SB11
Bronze medal – third place	2004 Athens	200m individual medley SM11
Representing Finland
World Championships
Bronze medal – third place	2025 Singapore	50 m freestyle S5
Bronze medal – third place	2025 Singapore	100 m freestyle S5
Bronze medal – third place	2025 Singapore	200 m freestyle S5
Women's goalball
Representing Germany
IBSA World Games
Gold medal – first place	Sao Paulo 2007	Women's tournament
European Championships
Gold medal – first place	2005 Belgium	Women’s tournament

Natalie Örnkvist (formerly Ball; born 13 February 1979) is a para-athlete who has competed in goalball and para swimming. As a goalball player, she competed for Great Britain at the 2000 Summer Paralympics and Germany at the 2008 Summer Paralympics. As a para swimmer, she has competed in the S11 and later S5 classification. She represented Germany at the 2004 Summer Paralympics, winning four medals. She then competed for Finland at the 2025 World Para Swimming Championships, winning three bronze medals.

== Early life and education ==
Natalie Ball was born in Nottingham, England, to a half-English and half-Welsh mother and a Tornedalian father, and she grew up in England and Germany. She has been blind since birth. After graduating from high school, she studied at the University of Greifswald in Germany.

== Career ==
Despite her disability, Ball wanted to pursue competitive sports and became a member of HSG Greifswald. She chose two different sports: swimming and goalball. As she quickly became one of the club's top performers in both sports, she was called up to the respective national teams and competed in international competitions.

Ball became a member of the German national swimming team at the 2004 Summer Paralympics in Athens, where she competed in three swimming events and achieved success. At these Games, she won three silver medals and one bronze medal in the S11 performance class: one silver medal each in the 50m breaststroke, 100m freestyle, and 100m breaststroke; she also won a bronze medal in the 200m individual medley. She was also successful in her second sport, goalball: at the 2005 European Championships, she took first place and won the gold medal. She also won a gold medal in goalball at the 2007 IBSA World Games. For her medal win at the 2004 Summer Paralympics, she received the Silver Laurel Leaf.

In September 2025, Örnkvist made her return to swimming, competing for Finland at the 2025 World Para Swimming Championships. In her first event, she won a bronze medal in the 50 metre freestyle event. She also won the bronze medal in the 200 m freestyle and 100 m freestyle.

== Personal life ==
After graduating in 2004 with a degree in Northern European geography, Ball went to Finland to study singing. She has a master's degree, which she received from the Sibelius Academy in 2017.

Örnkvist moved to Finland in the early 2010s. She is wheelchair bound and works as a cantor in the parish of Saltvik in Åland. She holds both British and Finnish citizenships.
