= Maria Poiani Panigati =

Italian Paralympic swimmer

Personal information
- Born: 17 March 1982 (age 44) Pavia, Italy

Sport
- Country: Italy
- Sport: Paralympic swimming
- Disability class: S11
Medal record
Paralympic swimming
Representing Italy
Paralympic Games
Gold medal – first place	2008 Beijing	Women's 50m freestyle S11

Maria Poiani Panigati (born 17 March 1982) is a former Italian Paralympic swimmer who competed in freestyle swimming events in international level events. She was a Paralympic champion in the 50m freestyle S11 at the 2008 Summer Paralympics.
