= Kirby Cote =

Canadian Paralympic swimmer

Personal information
- Full name: Kirby Cote
- Nationality: Canadian
- Born: April 29, 1984 (age 42)

Sport
- Sport: Swimming
- Strokes: backstroke, breaststroke, butterfly, freestyle, medley
Medal record
Paralympics
Gold medal – first place	2000 Sydney	100 m breaststroke SB13
Gold medal – first place	2000 Sydney	200 m medley SM13
Gold medal – first place	2004 Athens	50 m freestyle S13
Gold medal – first place	2004 Athens	100 m freestyle S13
Gold medal – first place	2004 Athens	400 m freestyle S13
Gold medal – first place	2004 Athens	100 m butterfly S13
Gold medal – first place	2004 Athens	200 m medley SM13
Silver medal – second place	2000 Sydney	50 m freestyle S13
Silver medal – second place	2000 Sydney	100 m freestyle S13
Silver medal – second place	2004 Athens	100 m backstroke S13
Silver medal – second place	2004 Athens	100 m breaststroke SB13
Silver medal – second place	2008 Beijing	100 m butterfly S13
Silver medal – second place	2008 Beijing	200 m medley SM13
IPC World Championships
Gold medal – first place	2002 Mar del Plata	50 m freestyle S13
Gold medal – first place	2002 Mar del Plata	100 m freestyle S13
Gold medal – first place	2002 Mar del Plata	400 m freestyle S13
Gold medal – first place	2002 Mar del Plata	100 m breaststroke SB13
Gold medal – first place	2002 Mar del Plata	200 m medley SM13
Gold medal – first place	2006 Durban	100 m breaststroke SB13
Commonwealth Games
Bronze medal – third place	2002 Manchester	100 m EAD freestyle
- Updated on January 18, 2014

Kirby Cote (born April 29, 1984) is a blind Canadian Paralympic swimmer.

== Career ==
Cote first competed for Canada at the 2000 Summer Paralympics in Sydney, where she won gold in both the 100 metre breaststroke SB13 and the 200 metre individual medley SM13 setting new world record times of 1:19.43 and 2:29.59 respectively. Cote also took silver in the 50 metre freestyle S13 in 28.80, and in the 100 metre freestyle S13 in 1:02.98.

At the 2002 Commonwealth Games in Manchester, Cote won bronze in the 100 metre EAD freestyle. Competing against swimmers in other classifications, Cote covered the distance in a Games record time of 1:01.76, 1.88 seconds over her target time.

At the 2002 IPC World Championships in Mar del Plata, Argentina, Cote won gold in five events including the 50 metre freestyle S13 in 28.84, the 100 metre freestyle S13 in 1:02.19, the 400 metre freestyle S13 in 4:58.15, the 100 metre breaststroke SB13 in 1:17.89 and the 200 metre individual medley SM13 in 2:30.11.

At the 2004 Summer Paralympics in Athens, Cote won gold in the 50 metre freestyle S13 in 28.47, gold in the 100 metre freestyle S13 in 1:01.74, gold in the 400 metre freestyle S13 in 4:43.23, gold in the 100 metre butterfly S13 in 1:07.44, gold in the 200 metre individual medley SM13 in 2:31.20, silver in the 100 metre backstroke S13 in 1:14.08 and silver in the 100 metre breaststroke SB13 in 1:17.34.

At the 2006 IPC World Championships in Durban, South Africa, Cote won gold in the 100 metre breaststroke SB13 in 1:21.05, 5th in the 50 metre freestyle S13 in 29.02 and 7th in the 100 metre freestyle S13 in 1:03.76.

At the 2008 Summer Paralympics in Beijing, Cote won silver in the 100 metre butterfly S13 in 1:06.62 and in the 200 metre individual medley SM13 in 2:28.65. In other results, Cote finished 4th in the 50 metre freestyle S13 in 28.08 and also finished 4th in the 100 metre freestyle S13 in 28.08.

Cote was inducted into the Manitoba Sports Hall of Fame in 2018.
