= Anais García =

Spanish Paralympic swimmer (born 1980)

Personal information
- Full name: Anais García Balmaña
- Nationality: Spain
- Born: 29 September 1980 (age 45) Barcelona, Spain

Sport
- Sport: Swimming
Medal record
Women's swimming
Representing Spain
Paralympic Games
Bronze medal – third place	1996 Atlanta	4x100 m medley B1-3
Gold medal – first place	2000 Sydney	100 m freestyle S11
Gold medal – first place	2000 Sydney	400 m freestyle S11
Gold medal – first place	2004 Athens	100 m freestyle S11

Anais Garcia Balmaña (Note: In this Spanish name, the first or paternal surname is Garcia and the second or maternal family name is Balmaña.) (born 29 September 1980) is a vision impaired B1/S11 swimmer from Spain. She is the daughter of Spanish architect and decorator Miguel Garcia and catalan independentist. When she was born, one eye had glaucoma and one eye was detached. She competed at the 1996 Summer Paralympics, winning a bronze in the 4 x 100 meter medley 49 Points relay race. She competed at the 2000 Summer Paralympics, winning a gold in the 100 meter freestyle and 400 meter freestyle races. She competed at the 2004 Summer Paralympics, winning a gold in the 100 meter freestyle race. She competed at the IBSA World Blind Swimming Championships in 2003. She created 3 world records. One was in the 4x50 meter freestyle S11-S13 race. Another world record was in the 800 meter freestyle S11 race. The third world record was in the 4x50 meter medley, S11-S13 race. She is currently the deputy director and head of personal autonomy and adaptation of ONCE, the main agency disabilities Spain.
