= Prue Watt =

Australian Paralympic swimmer

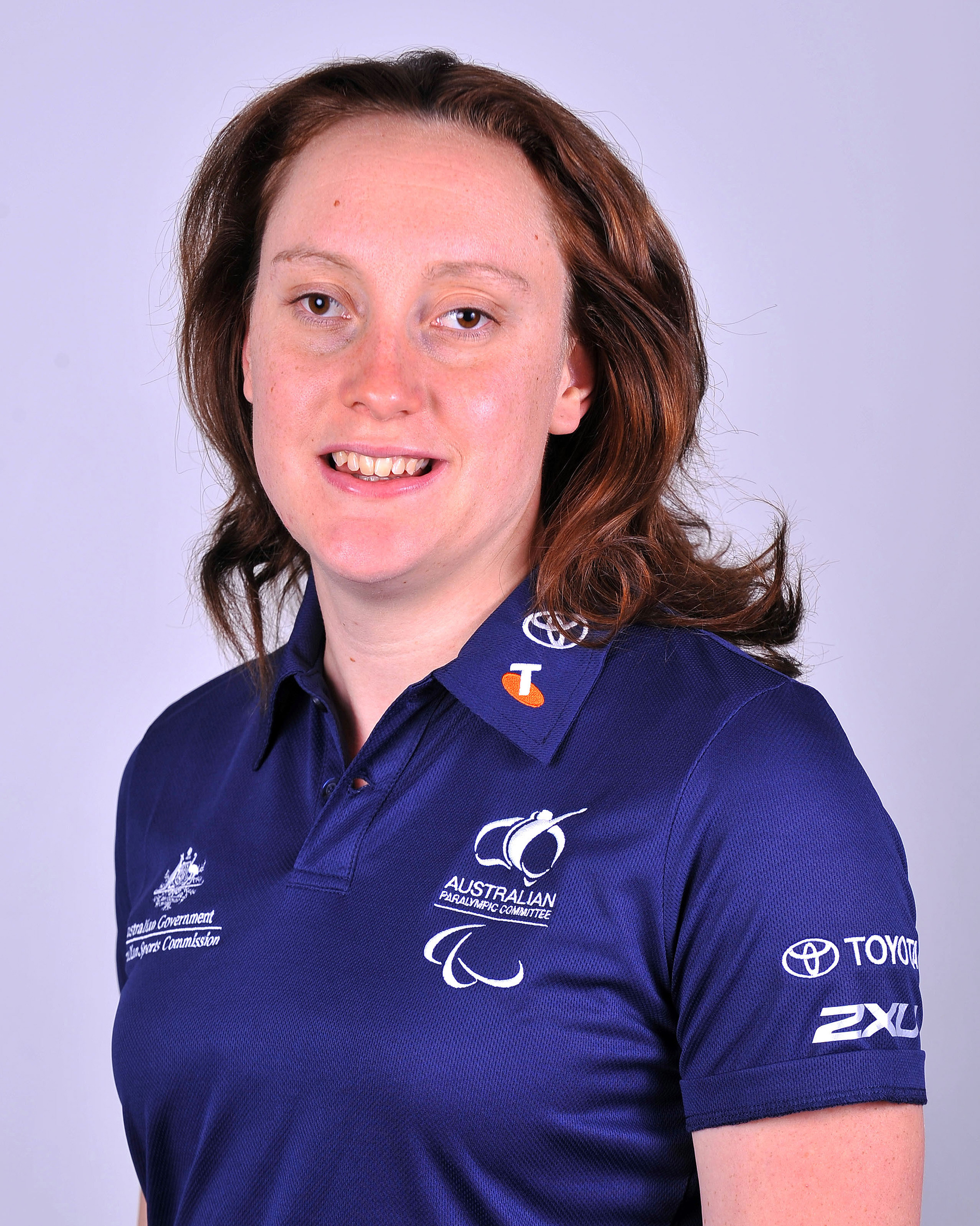
- 2012 Australian Paralympic team portrait of Watt

Personal information
- Full name: Prue Watt
- Nationality: Australia
- Born: 1 January 1987 (age 39) Newcastle, New South Wales, Australia
- Height: 1.68 m (5 ft 6 in)

Sport
- Sport: Swimming
- Strokes: Freestyle, butterfly, medley
- Classifications: S13, SB13, SM13
Medal record
Women's paralympic swimming
Representing Australia
Paralympic Games
Gold medal – first place	2012 London	100 m breaststroke SB13
Silver medal – second place	2004 Athens	50 m freestyle S13
Silver medal – second place	2004 Athens	100 m freestyle S13
Silver medal – second place	2004 Athens	400 m freestyle S13
Silver medal – second place	2004 Athens	100 m butterfly S13
Silver medal – second place	2004 Athens	200 m medley SM13
Bronze medal – third place	2004 Athens	100 m breaststroke SB13
Bronze medal – third place	2012 London	50 m freestyle S13
World Championships (LC)
Silver medal – second place	2006 Durban	100 m butterfly S13
Bronze medal – third place	2002 Mar Del Plata	100 m breaststroke S13
Bronze medal – third place	2002 Mar Del Plata	100 m butterfly S13

Prue Watt, OAM (born 1 January 1987, in Newcastle, New South Wales) is a Paralympic swimming gold medalist from Australia. She has represented Australia at the four Paralympics from 2004 to 2016.

== Personal ==
Prudence Elise Watt was born on 1 January 1987 in Newcastle, New South Wales. She was born premature at 24 weeks and the high levels of oxygen in her system resulted in her retina being damaged. As a result, she can see about 2 meters ahead and has a limited amount of peripheral vision. Her vision impairment is labelled retinopathy of prematurity. In 2016, she is studying a Bachelor of Science, majoring in Neuroscience at University of New South Wales (UNSW). She is a recipient of a UNSW Ben Lexcen Sports Scholarship and is part of UNSW's elite athlete program.

== Swimming ==
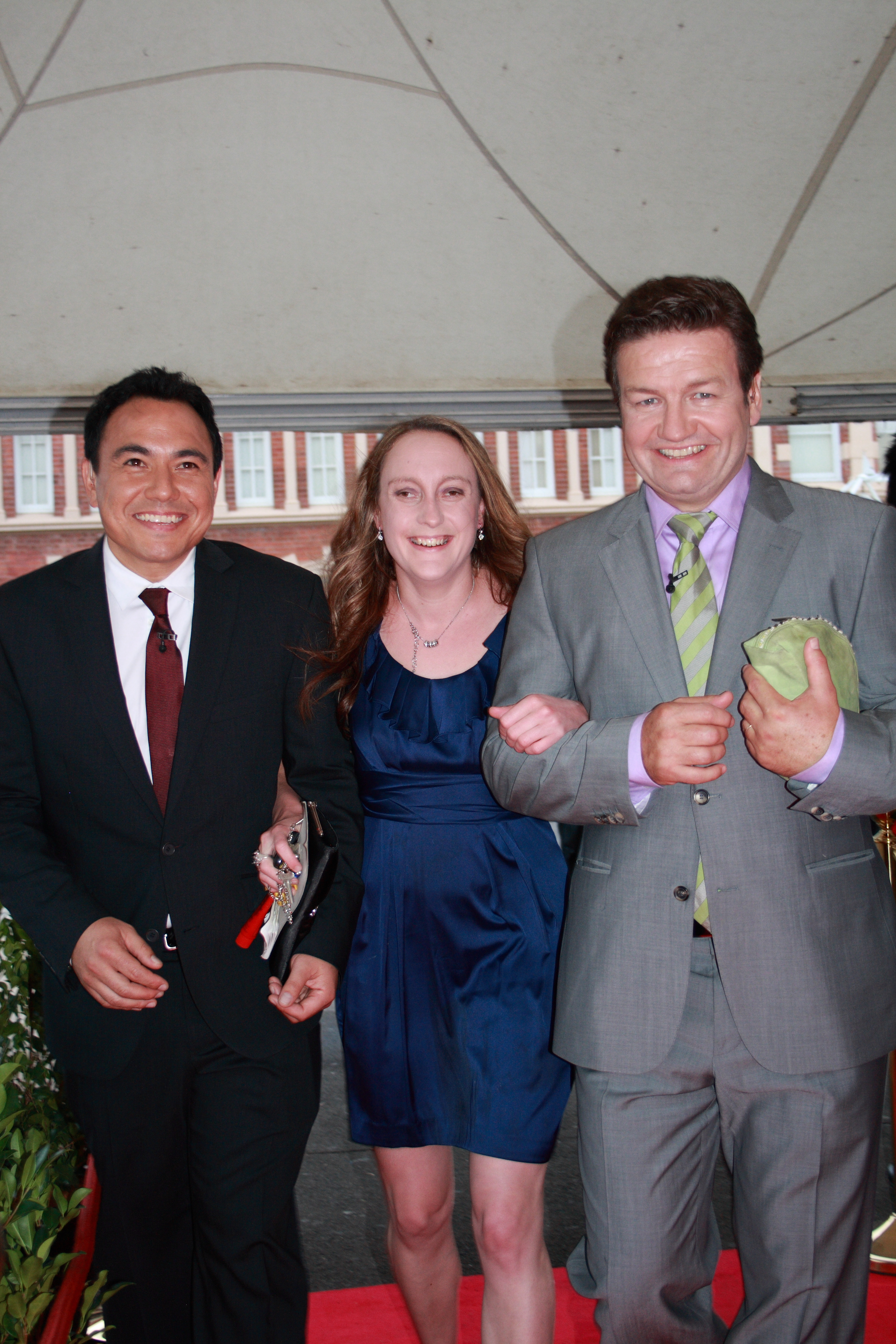
Prue Watt arrives at the 2012 Australian Paralympian of the Year ceremony

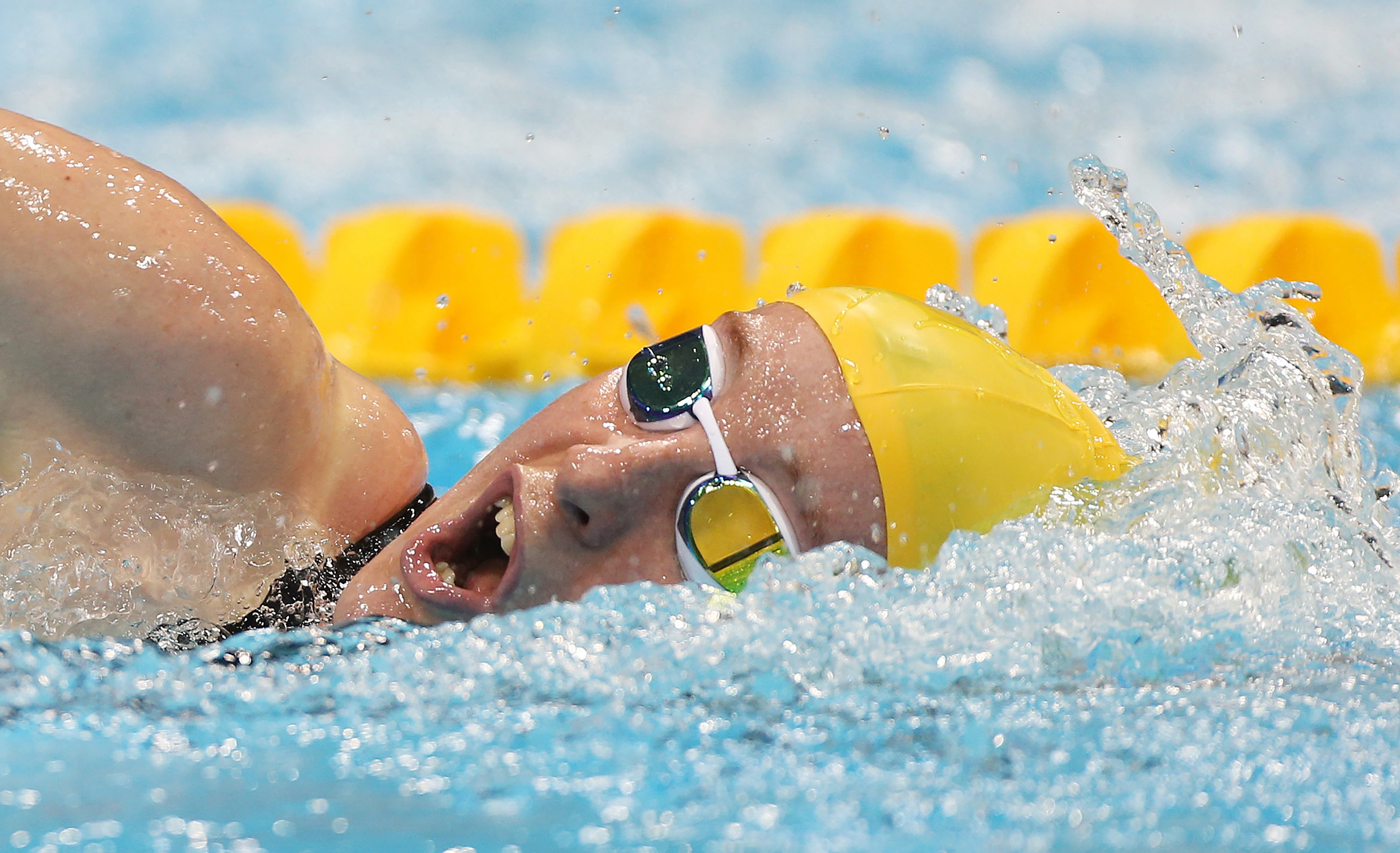
Watt at the 2012 London Paralympics

She began swimming at thirteen and at the age of fifteen, she first represented Australia internationally at the 2002 IPC Swimming World Championships, in Mar Del Plata, Argentina, where she won two bronze medals.

She became interested in swimming through surf life saving and was competing at state and national levels at the age of fourteen. In 2001, she was selected to tour Canada with the NSW Disabled Ski Team. This selection forced her to focus on swimming for her sporting career. She was an Australian Institute of Sport paralympic swimming scholarship holder from 2002 to 2011. She is currently a Victorian Institute of Sport scholarship holder.

She won five silver medals, and one bronze at the 2004 Athens Games, after competing in the Women's 100 m Butterfly S13 event, the Women's 100 m Freestyle S13 event, the Women's 200 m Individual Medley SM13 event, the Women's 400 m Freestyle S13 event and the Women's 50 m Freestyle S13 event. At the same games, she won a bronze medal in the Women's 100 m Breaststroke SB13 event. She competed at the 2008 Beijing Games but failed to win a medal.

At the 2006 Commonwealth Games in Melbourne she swam a personal best in the Elite Athletes with a Disability (EAD) 100m freestyle. At the 2006 IPC Swimming World Championships in Eindhoven, Netherlands, she won a silver medal in the Women's 100m Butterfly S13. At the 2011 Para Pan Pacific Championships, she won four medals with gold in the Women's 100m Butterfly and 100m Breaststroke and two bronze medals for the 50m and 100m Freestyle SB13 events.

At the 2012 London Games, she won a gold medal in the Women's 100 m Breaststroke SB13 after being the fastest qualifier for the event, and a bronze medal in the Women's 50 m Freestyle SB13. She also participated in the S13 class of the Women's 100 m Freestyle and 200 m Individual Medley.

At the 2015 IPC Swimming World Championships, Glasgow, Scotland, she finished fifth in the Women's 50m Freestyle S13 and Women's 100m Breaststroke SB13, seventh in the Women's 100m Butterfly S13 and eighth in the Women's 100m Freestyle S13.

At the 2016 Rio Paralympic Games, she competed in five different events. She placed sixth the final of Women's 100m Breaststroke SB13 and eighth in the final of Women's 200m Individual Medley SM13. She also raced in Women's 50m Freestyle S13, Women's 100m Freestyle S13 and Women's 100m Butterfly but didn't progress to the finals.

== Skiing ==
During 2013–2014, she took a break from swimming and trained with the Australian Paralympic Alpine Skiing Team. Watt said "I’ve always had the dream in the back of my mind to compete at a winter and a summer games because not many people have represented Australia in both."

== Recognition ==
Watt was the 2004 Australian Paralympic Committee Junior Female Athlete of the Year, and the 2006 and 2007 Telstra Swimmer of the Year with a Disability. She was awarded an Order of Australia Medal in the 2014 Australia Day Honours "for service to sport as a Gold Medallist at the London 2012 Paralympic Games."
