= Elaine Barrett =

British Paralympic swimmer

Personal information
- Born: 10 March 1977 (age 49) Hackney, London, Great Britain
- Home town: Stoke Newington, Great Britain

Sport
- Country: Great Britain
- Sport: Paralympic swimming
- Disability class: S11, SB11, SM11
- Coached by: Michelle Weltmann
Medal record
Paralympic swimming
Representing Great Britain
Paralympic Games
Gold medal – first place	2004 Athens	Women's 100m breaststroke SB11
Silver medal – second place	1996 Atlanta	Women's 100m breaststroke B2
Silver medal – second place	1996 Atlanta	Women's 200m breaststroke B2
Silver medal – second place	2000 Sydney	Women's 200m individual medley SM11
Bronze medal – third place	2000 Sydney	Women's 100m breaststroke SB12
World Championships
Gold medal – first place	1994 Malta	Women's 200m individual medley B1-2
Gold medal – first place	1994 Malta	Women's 4x100m medley relay S11-13
Gold medal – first place	2002 Mar del Plata	Women's 100m butterfly S11
Gold medal – first place	2002 Mar del Plata	Women's 100m breaststroke SB11
Gold medal – first place	2002 Mar del Plata	Women's 200m individual medley SM11
Silver medal – second place	2002 Mar del Plata	Women's 100m freestyle S11
Bronze medal – third place	1994 Malta	Women's 400m freestyle B1-2

Elaine Barrett (born 10 March 1977) is a retired British Paralympic swimmer who competed in international level events. She was born with underdeveloped eyes and little enough sight to be registered as blind, and later lost her sight entirely over 1997.

Barret was inducted to the London Youth Games Hall of Fame in 2011.
