= Fabiana Sugimori =

Brazilian Paralympic swimmer

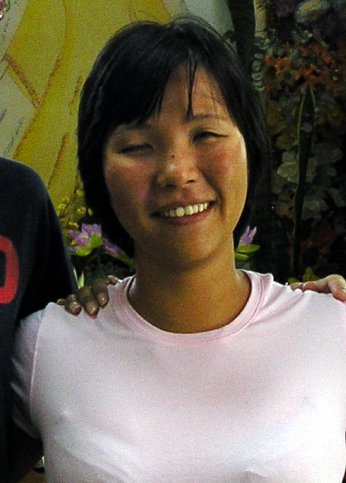

Personal information
- Full name: Fabiana Harumi Sugimori
- Born: 1 December 1980 (age 45) Campinas, Brazil
- Height: 1.57 m (5 ft 2 in)
- Weight: 50 kg (110 lb)

Sport
- Country: Brazil
- Sport: Paralympic swimming
- Disability class: S11
- Club: Tenis Clube Campinas
- Coached by: Marcelo Sugimori; Leonardo Tomasello Araujo
Medal record
Paralympic swimming
Representing Brazil
Paralympic Games
Gold medal – first place	2000 Sydney	Women's 50m freestyle S11
Gold medal – first place	2004 Athens	Women's 50m freestyle S11
Bronze medal – third place	2008 Beijing	Women's 50m freestyle S11
World Championships
Gold medal – first place	2002 Mar del Plata	Women's 50m freestyle S11
Gold medal – first place	2002 Mar del Plata	Women's 100m freestyle S11
Gold medal – first place	2006 Durban	Women's 50m freestyle S11
Bronze medal – third place	2002 Mar del Plata	Women's 200m individual medley SM11
Bronze medal – third place	2006 Durban	Women's 100m freestyle S11
Parapan American Games
Gold medal – first place	2003 Mar del Plata	Women's 50m freestyle S11
Gold medal – first place	2003 Mar del Plata	Women's 100m freestyle S11
Gold medal – first place	2003 Mar del Plata	Women's 100m butterfly S11
Gold medal – first place	2003 Mar del Plata	Women's 100m breaststroke SB11
Gold medal – first place	2003 Mar del Plata	Women's 200m individual medley SM11

Fabiana Harumi Sugimori (born 1 December 1980) is a retired Brazilian Paralympic swimmer who competed in international level events. She was born prematurely and her vision was severely damaged by the oxygen in an incubator that she was treated in.
