= Chantal Cavin =

Swiss Paralympic swimmer (born 1978)

Personal information
- Born: 12 February 1978 (age 48) Bern, Switzerland
- Height: 1.68 m (5 ft 6 in)
- Weight: 60 kg (132 lb)

Sport
- Country: Switzerland
- Sport: Paralympic swimming
- Disability class: S11
Medal record
Paralympic swimming
Representing Switzerland
World Championships (LC)
Gold medal – first place	2006 Durban	100m freestyle S11
Silver medal – second place	2006 Durban	50m freestyle S11
Silver medal – second place	2006 Durban	400m freestyle S11
Silver medal – second place	2006 Durban	100m breaststroke SB11
Bronze medal – third place	2010 Eindhoven	400m freestyle S11
World Championships (SC)
Gold medal – first place	2009 Rio de Janeiro	50m freestyle S11
Bronze medal – third place	2009 Rio de Janeiro	100m butterfly S11

Chantal Cavin (born 12 February 1978) is a retired Swiss Paralympic swimmer who competed in international elite events. She is a World champion in both long course and short course freestyle swimming, she has also competed at the Paralympic Games three times but narrowly missed out on winning any medals at the 2008 Summer Paralympics in the 50m and 100m freestyle. Cavin lost her sight at the age of fourteen when she had a concussion following a sporting accident.
