= Rina Akiyama (swimmer) =

Japanese Paralympic swimmer

Medal record

Women's swimming

Representing Japan

Paralympic Games
Gold medal – first place	2012 London	100 m backstroke S11
Silver medal – second place	2004 Athens	100 m backstroke S11

Rina Akiyama (秋山 里奈, Akiyama Rina) is a Paralympic swimmer from Japan competing mainly in category S11 events.

Rina competed as part of the Japanese Paralympic swimming team at two Paralympics, firstly in 2004 and then again in 2008. In 2004, she finished sixth in the 200 m individual medley, sixth in her heat in the 50 m freestyle, fifth in the 100 m freestyle heat, eighth in the final of the 100m breaststroke. At the 2004 games she improved to finish second behind Qimeng Dong of China who swam a 100 m backstroke world record she also finished eighth in the 50 m freestyle and finished fifth in her heat of the 100 m freestyle.
