= Rhiannon Henry =

Welsh triathlete

Personal information
- Nationality: British
- Born: 20 May 1987 (age 39) Bridgend, Wales

Sport
- Club: City of Manchester Aquatics
Medal record
Women's swimming
Representing Great Britain
Paralympic Games
Bronze medal – third place	2004 Athens	100 m butterfly S13
Bronze medal – third place	2004 Athens	400 m freestyle S13
IPC World Championships
Gold medal – first place	2010 Eindhoven	100 m butterfly S13
Silver medal – second place	2002 Mar del Plata	100 m butterfly S13
Silver medal – second place	2010 Eindhoven	400 m freestyle S13
Bronze medal – third place	2002 Mar del Plata	200 m medley SM13
Bronze medal – third place	2002 Mar del Plata	100 m freestyle S13
Bronze medal – third place	2002 Mar del Plata	400 m freestyle S13
Bronze medal – third place	2006 Durban	100 m butterfly S13
Bronze medal – third place	2010 Eindhoven	100 m freestyle S13

Rhiannon Henry (born 20 May 1987) is a Welsh swimmer, paracyclist and paratriathlete who has competed in the Paralympic Games on three occasions winning two medals in swimming events. She also won World and European Championship medals as a swimmer. However, after coming away from the 2012 Summer Paralympics in London without a medal, she switched to paracyling and joined the British Cycling Paralympic Academy programme, competing as a visually-impaired rider as part of a tandem pairing. She made her debut alongside Fiona Duncan at the 2013 Tandem Tour of Belgium, finishing sixth and helping teammates Lora Turnham and Corinne Hall to victory.

Henry represented Wales at the Commonwealth Games in Glasgow, 2014 where she rode with pilot Rachel James. She teamed up with Lauryn Therin at the 2014 British National Track Championships, where they finished second in the blind and visually impaired para-cycling pursuit.

Henry switched to triathlon in late 2014 and began training with the Great Britain Paratriathlon squad. She won her first ever race at the World Paratriathlon Event in East London, South Africa where she was piloted by Nicole Walters.
