= Chelsey Gotell =

Canadian Paralympic swimmer

Personal information
- Born: February 20, 1986 (age 40) Antigonish, Nova Scotia, Canada
- Height: 170 cm (67 in)

Sport
- Sport: Swimming
- Strokes: Freestyle, Backstroke, Butterfly, Breaststroke
- Classifications: S13
- Club: Antigonish Aquanauts
- College team: McMaster Marauders
Medal record
Representing Canada
Paralympic Games
Gold medal – first place	2004 Athens	100m backstroke S13
Gold medal – first place	2008 Beijing	100m backstroke S13
Gold medal – first place	2008 Beijing	200m individual medley SM13
Silver medal – second place	2000 Sydney	100m breaststroke SB13
Silver medal – second place	2008 Beijing	100m freestyle S13
Bronze medal – third place	2000 Sydney	50m freestyle S13
Bronze medal – third place	2000 Sydney	200m individual medley SM13
Bronze medal – third place	2004 Athens	50m freestyle S13
Bronze medal – third place	2004 Athens	100m freestyle S13
Bronze medal – third place	2004 Athens	200m individual medley SM13
Bronze medal – third place	2008 Beijing	400m freestyle S13
Bronze medal – third place	2008 Beijing	100m butterfly S13
World Championships
Gold medal – first place	2002 Mar del Plata	100m backstroke S13
Gold medal – first place	2002 Mar del Plata	100m butterfly S13
Gold medal – first place	2010 Eindhoven	100m breaststroke SB13
Silver medal – second place	2002 Mar del Plata	50m freestyle S13
Silver medal – second place	2002 Mar del Plata	100m freestyle S13
Silver medal – second place	2002 Mar del Plata	400m freestyle S13
Silver medal – second place	2002 Mar del Plata	200m individual medley SM13
Silver medal – second place	2010 Eindhoven	100m backstroke S13
Bronze medal – third place	2002 Mar del Plata	50m freestyle S13
Bronze medal – third place	2006 Durban	50m freestyle S13
Bronze medal – third place	2006 Durban	100m backstroke S13
Bronze medal – third place	2006 Durban	200m individual medley SM13
Bronze medal – third place	2010 Eindhoven	200m individual medley SM13
Parapan American Games
Gold medal – first place	2007 Rio de Janeiro	50m freestyle S13
Gold medal – first place	2007 Rio de Janeiro	100m backstroke S13
Silver medal – second place	2007 Rio de Janeiro	100m freestyle S13
Silver medal – second place	2007 Rio de Janeiro	400m freestyle S13
Bronze medal – third place	2007 Rio de Janeiro	200m individual medley SM13

Chelsey Gotell (born February 20, 1986) is a Canadian Paralympic swimmer and 12-time medalist. She has oculocutaneous albinism which causes her to have poor vision.

== Personal life ==
Gotell was born and raised in Antigonish, Nova Scotia. She loved sport from an early age and at the age of eight began swimming when she joined a local swim club with her friend. She was classified into the S13 swimming classification at 13. At 14, Gotell qualified for her first Paralympic Games. Chelsey attended McMaster University and earned a Bachelor of Arts in psychology. Through her five years at McMaster, she was a member of the McMaster Marauders Varsity Swim Team, was nominated rookie of the year in 2005-2006 and was the teams most improved swimmer for the 2008 season.

Chelsey has served as the Athlete Services Officer for the Canadian Paralympic Team Mission Staff at the London 2012, Sochi 2014, TORONTO 2015 Games and will add her fourth Games as staff this summer at the Rio 2016 Paralympic Games. She worked for the Toronto 2015 Pan Am/Parapan Am Games Organizing Committee for over four years in the communications, athlete relations and sport. She is currently the Chairperson of the International Paralympic Committee (IPC) Athletes' Council, member of the IPC Governing Board, IOC Athletes' Commission and World Anti Doping Agency Athlete Committee.

She currently resides in Toronto, Ontario with her husband Steve, is the mom of Emily and owns and operates a private Osteopathic practice - Etobicoke Osteopathy - where she is an Osteopathic Manual Practitioner.

== Swimming career ==
Gotell has participated in a total of three Paralympic Games including the 2000 Sydney Paralympics, the 2004 Athens Paralympics, and the 2008 Beijing Paralympics. She also competed in the 2007 Parapan American Games.

Chelsey qualified for the Sydney 2000 Paralympic Games and was the youngest member of the Canadian delegation. She won a bronze medal in the 200m Individual Medley and in the 50m Freestyle. She also won a silver medal in the 100m Breaststroke. In the Athens 2004 Paralympic Games, Chelsey won her first gold medal in the 100m Backstroke. She also won three bronze medals in 50m Freestyle, the 100m Freestyle, and the 200m Individual Medley. In 2008 she competed in her final Paralympic Games in Beijing, where she won two gold medals and set world records in both the 100m Backstroke and the 200m Individual Medley. She also won a silver medal in the 100m Freestyle, and two bronze medals in the 400m Freestyle and 100m Butterfly. She was also part of two Canadian sweeps of the podium (100m butterfly and 200m individual medley) and was one of Canada's most decorated athletes of the Games.

In 2002, 2006 and 2010 she competed in the IPC Swimming World Championships where she won three gold, five silver and three bronze medals.

in 2006 she placed sixth in both the 50m freestyle and 100m freestyle in the multi-disability classification at the 2006 Commonwealth Games in Melbourne.

To round out her Games experience, she won five medals at the 2007 Parapan Am Games in Rio de Janeiro; two gold, two silver, and one bronze.
